= 2019 in paleoentomology =

2019 in paleoentomology is a list of new fossil insect taxa that were described during the year 2019, as well as other significant discoveries and events related to paleoentomology that occurred during the year.

== New taxa ==
=== Coleopterans ===
Name	Novelty	Status	Authors	Age	Type locality	Country	Notes	Images
Acalyptomerus thayerae	Sp. nov	Valid	Cai & Lawrence in Cai et al.	Late Cretaceous (Cenomanian)	Burmese amber	Myanmar	A member of the family Clambidae.	
Agabus latissimus	Sp. nov	Valid	Ponomarenko in Kirejtshuk et al.	Late Eocene	Insect Limestone	United Kingdom	A species of Agabus.	
Airaphilus simulacrum	Sp. nov	Valid	Alekseev, Bukejs & McKellar in Alekseev et al.	Eocene	Baltic amber	Russia (Kaliningrad Oblast)	A species of Airaphilus.	
Allostrophus yangi	Sp. nov	Valid	Hsiao	Late Cretaceous (Cenomanian)	Burmese amber	Myanmar	A member of the family Tetratomidae.	
Ambarticus	Gen. et sp. nov	Valid	Yang, Chen & Jia	Late Cretaceous (Cenomanian)	Burmese amber	Myanmar	A member of the family Dytiscidae. Genus includes new species A. myanmaricus.	
Amberophlus	Gen. et sp. nov	Valid	Novák & Háva	Eocene	Baltic amber	Russia (Kaliningrad Oblast)	A darkling beetle belonging to the subfamily Alleculinae and the tribe Cteniopodini. The type species is A. niger.	
Amberophytum	Gen. et sp. nov	Valid	Yu, Ślipiński & Pang in Yu et al.	Late Cretaceous (Cenomanian)	Burmese amber	Myanmar	A member of the family Cerophytidae. Genus includes new species A. birmanicum.	
Anacaena morla	Sp. nov	Valid	Arriaga Varela et al.	Eocene	Baltic amber	Europe (Baltic Sea region)	A species of Anacaena. Announced in 2019; the final version of the article naming it was published in 2021.	
Anchonus acrolepidotus	Sp. nov	Valid	Poinar & Legalov	Early Miocene	Dominican amber	Dominican Republic	A species of Anchonus.	
Anchonus bothynus	Sp. nov	Valid	Poinar & Legalov	Early Miocene	Dominican amber	Dominican Republic	A species of Anchonus.	
Angimordella	Gen. et sp. nov	Valid	Bao et al.	Late Cretaceous (Cenomanian)	Burmese amber	Myanmar	A member of the family Mordellidae. The type species is A. burmitina.	
Anisotoma antediluviana	Sp. nov	Valid	Alekseev	Eocene	Baltic amber	Russia (Kaliningrad Oblast)	A species of Anisotoma.	
Anthonoeugnomus	Gen. et sp. nov	Valid	Legalov	Eocene	Baltic amber	Europe (Baltic Sea region)	A member of the family Curculionidae belonging to the subfamily Curculioninae and the tribe Eugnomini. The type species is A. barsevskisi.	
Anthonomus clarki	Sp. nov	Valid	Legalov	Early Miocene	Dominican amber	Dominican Republic	A species of Anthonomus.	
Aphodius vectis	Sp. nov	Valid	Krell in Kirejtshuk et al.	Late Eocene	Insect Limestone	United Kingdom	A species of Aphodius.	
Aploceble lateantennata	Sp. nov	Valid	Tshernyshev	Late Eocene	Baltic amber	Europe (Baltic Sea region)	A member of the subfamily Rhadalinae belonging to the tribe Aplocnemini.	
Aplocnemus baltiensis	Sp. nov	Valid	Tshernyshev	Late Eocene	Baltic amber	Europe (Baltic Sea region)	A species of Aplocnemus.	
Aplocnemus hoffeinsorum	Sp. nov	Valid	Tshernyshev	Late Eocene	Baltic amber	Europe (Baltic Sea region)	A species of Aplocnemus.	
Archaeocerus	Gen. et sp. nov	Valid	Perreau	Cretaceous (Albian/Cenomanian)	Burmese amber	Myanmar	A member of the family Leiodidae. Genus includes new species A. uenoi.	
Archaeonebria	Gen. et sp. nov	Valid	Schmidt, Scholz & Kavanaugh	Eocene	Baltic amber	Europe (Baltic Sea region)	A ground beetle belonging to the tribe Nebriini. Genus includes new species A. inexspectata.	
Archemastax	Gen. et sp. nov	Valid	Yin et al.	Late Cretaceous (Cenomanian)	Burmese amber	Myanmar	An ant-like stone beetle. Genus includes new species A. divida.	
Arostropsis gusakovi	Sp. nov	Valid	Legalov	Eocene	Baltic amber	Europe (Baltic Sea region)	A species of Arostropsis.	
Arostropsis perkovskyi	Sp. nov	Valid	Bukejs & Legalov	Late Eocene	Rovno amber	Ukraine	A species of Arostropsis.	
Attalus flexus	Sp. nov	Valid	Kirejtshuk in Kirejtshuk et al.	Late Eocene	Insect Limestone	United Kingdom	A member of Malachiidae.	
Baltoapion	Gen. et comb. nov	Valid	Legalov	Eocene	Baltic amber	Europe (Baltic Sea region)	A member of the family Brentidae belonging to the subfamily Apioninae. The type species is "Melanapion" gusakovi Legalov (2015); genus also includes "Apion" subdiscedens Voss (1953).	
Baltoconapium	Gen. et comb. nov	Valid	Legalov	Eocene	Baltic amber	Europe (Baltic Sea region)	A member of the family Brentidae belonging to the subfamily Apioninae. The type species is "Apion" anderseni Voss (1972).	
Baltocurculio	Gen. et sp. nov	Valid	Legalov	Eocene	Baltic amber	Europe (Baltic Sea region)	A member of the family Curculionidae belonging to the subfamily Curculioninae and the tribe Curculionini. The type species is B. manukyani.	
Baltognathus	Gen. et sp. nov	Valid	Brunke, Żyła & Solodovnikov in Brunke et al.	Middle Eocene	Baltic amber	Europe (Baltic Sea region)	A rove beetle belonging to the subfamily Staphylininae and the tribe Staphylinini. The type species is B. aenigmaticus.	
Baltostigus substriatus	Sp. nov	Valid	Jałoszyński & Perkovsky	Late Eocene	Rovno amber	Ukraine	An ant-like stone beetle.	
Berosus barclayi	Sp. nov	Valid	Ponomarenko & Soriano in Kirejtshuk et al.	Late Eocene	Insect Limestone	United Kingdom	A species of Berosus.	
Bolitogyrus fragmentus	Sp. nov	Valid	Brunke, Żyła & Solodovnikov in Brunke et al.	Middle Eocene	Baltic amber	Europe (Baltic Sea region)	A rove beetle belonging to the subfamily Staphylininae and the tribe Staphylinini.	
Brachycerophytum cretaceum	Sp. nov	Valid	Yu, Ślipiński & Pang in Yu et al.	Late Cretaceous (Cenomanian)	Burmese amber	Myanmar	A member of the family Cerophytidae.	
Burmahelota	Gen. et sp. nov	Valid	Liu et al.	Late Cretaceous (Cenomanian)	Burmese amber	Myanmar	A member of the family Helotidae. Genus includes new species B. pengweii.	
Burmolycus	Gen. et sp. nov	Valid	Bocak, Li & Ellenberger	Late Cretaceous (Cenomanian)	Burmese amber	Myanmar	A member of the family Lycidae belonging to the subfamily Dexorinae. Genus includes new species B. compactus.	
Burmomiles blixenae	Sp. nov	Valid	Fanti & Damgaard	Late Cretaceous (Cenomanian)	Burmese amber	Myanmar	A soldier beetle	
Burmophyletis	Nom. nov	Valid	Clarke & Oberprieler	Late Cretaceous (Cenomanian)	Burmese amber	Myanmar	A weevil belonging to the family Mesophyletidae and the subfamily Aepyceratinae; a replacement name for Platychirus Clarke & Oberprieler in Clarke et al. (2018).	Burmophyletis beloides
Burmops	Gen. et sp. nov	Valid	Kirejtshuk, Willig & Chetverikov	Late Cretaceous (Cenomanian)	Burmese amber	Myanmar	A member of the family Sphindidae belonging to the subfamily Protosphindinae. Genus includes new species B. neli.	
Byrrhites	Gen. et sp. nov	Valid	Kirejtshuk in Kirejtshuk et al.	Late Eocene	Insect Limestone	United Kingdom	A member of the family Byrrhidae. Genus includes new species B. bembridgensis.	
Cacomorphocerus coleae	Sp. nov	Valid	Fanti & Pankowski	Eocene	Baltic amber	Russia (Kaliningrad Oblast)	A soldier beetle.	
Cacomorphocerus endecacerus	Sp. nov	Valid	Poinar & Fanti	Eocene	Baltic amber	Russia (Kaliningrad Oblast)	A soldier beetle.	
Cacomorphocerus eocenicus	Sp. nov	Valid	Bukejs, Fanti & McKellar	Eocene	Baltic amber	Russia (Kaliningrad Oblast)	A soldier beetle.	
Cambaltica	Gen. et sp. nov	Valid	Nadein in Nadein & Perkovsky	Early Eocene	Cambay amber	India	A flea beetle. Genus includes new species C. paleoindica.	
Cantharis borki	Sp. nov	Valid	Fanti & Damgaard	Eocene	Prussian Formation (Baltic amber)	Poland	A species of Cantharis.	
Cantharis bradburyi	Sp. nov	Valid	Fanti & Walker	Oligocene	Rott Formation	Germany	A species of Cantharis.	
Cantharis doernerorum	Sp. nov	Valid	Fanti & Poschmann	Late Oligocene		Germany	A species of Cantharis.	
Cantharis dougi	Sp. nov	Valid	Kupryjanowicz & Fanti	Eocene (Lutetian to Priabonian)	Baltic amber	Russia (Kaliningrad Oblast)	A species of Cantharis.	
Cantharis lidiae	Sp. nov	Valid	Fanti & Walker	Oligocene	Rott Formation	Germany	A species of Cantharis.	
Cantharis rottensis	Sp. nov	Valid	Fanti & Walker	Oligocene	Rott Formation	Germany	A species of Cantharis.	
Cantharis zabolica	Sp. nov	Valid	Fanti & Poschmann	Late Oligocene		Germany	A species of Cantharis.	
Carabilarva gongi	Sp. nov	Valid	Zhao et al.	Middle Jurassic	Daohugou Beds	China	A member of Adephaga belonging to the group Caraboidea.	
Cathartosilvanus siteiterralevis	Sp. nov	Valid	Alekseev, Bukejs & McKellar	Eocene	Baltic amber	Russia (Kaliningrad Oblast)	A species of Cathartosilvanus.	
Caulophilus martynovae	Sp. nov	Valid	Legalov, Nazarenko & Perkovsky	Eocene	Rovno amber	Ukraine	A species of Caulophilus.	
Cenocephalus aniskini	Sp. nov	Valid	Legalov	Eocene	Baltic amber	Europe (Baltic Sea region)	A member of Platypodidae belonging to the subfamily Tesserocerinae and the tribe Tesserocerini.	
Cenomana	Gen. et sp. nov	Valid	Otto	Late Cretaceous (Cenomanian)	Burmese amber	Myanmar	A member of the family Eucnemidae; originally assigned to the subfamily Macraulacinae and the tribe Jenibuntorini, but subsequently transferred to the subfamily Melasinae and the tribe Dirhagini. The type species is C. clavata.	
Cerobates eocenicus	Sp. nov	Valid	Legalov & Wappler	Eocene	Eckfelder Maar	Germany	A species of Cerobates. Announced in 2019; the final version of the article naming it was published in 2021.	
Cerophytum albertalleni	Sp. nov	Valid	Yu, Ślipiński & Pang in Yu et al.	Late Cretaceous (Cenomanian)	Burmese amber	Myanmar	A species of Cerophytum.	
Clinops svachai	Sp. nov	Valid	Batelka & Prokop in Batelka, Perkovsky & Prokop	Eocene	Baltic amber	Lithuania	A member of the family Ripiphoridae belonging to the subfamily Pelecotominae.	
Cnathrion	Gen. et sp. nov	Valid	Kazantsev & Perkovsky	Middle Eocene	Sakhalinian amber	Russia	A soldier beetle. Genus includes new species C. sakhalinense.	
Compsus poinari	Sp. nov	Valid	Legalov	Early Miocene	Dominican amber	Dominican Republic	A species of Compsus.	
Contacyphon insularis	Sp. nov	Valid	Kirejtshuk & Ponomarenko in Kirejtshuk et al.	Late Eocene	Insect Limestone	United Kingdom	A species of Contacyphon.	
Contacyphon involutus	Sp. nov	Valid	Kirejtshuk & Ponomarenko in Kirejtshuk et al.	Late Eocene	Insect Limestone	United Kingdom	A species of Contacyphon.	
Contacyphon kozlovi	Sp. nov	Valid	Kirejtshuk & Ponomarenko in Kirejtshuk et al.	Late Eocene	Insect Limestone	United Kingdom	A species of Contacyphon.	
Corticariites	Gen. et sp. nov	Valid	Kirejtshuk in Kirejtshuk et al.	Late Eocene	Insect Limestone	United Kingdom	A member of the family Latridiidae. Genus includes new species C. kozlovi.	
Coxollodes palaeogenicus	Sp. nov	Valid	Kirejtshuk & Kurochkin in Kirejtshuk et al.	Late Eocene	Insect Limestone	United Kingdom	A sap beetle.	
Crenitis profechuyi	Sp. nov	Valid	Arriaga Varela et al.	Eocene	Baltic amber	Europe (Baltic Sea region)	A species of Crenitis. Announced in 2019; the final version of the article naming it was published in 2021.	
Cretaciella	Gen. et sp. nov		Perreau	Early Cretaceous (Albian)	Escucha Formation	Spain	A member of the family Leiodidae belonging to the subfamily Cholevinae and the tribe Oritocatopini. The type species is C. sorianoae	
Cretasernus	Gen. et sp. nov	Valid	Peris et al.	Late Cretaceous (Cenomanian)	Burmese amber	Myanmar	A member of the family Ptinidae. Genus includes new species C. spinosus.	
Cretoboganium	Gen. et sp. nov	Valid	Cai & Huang	Late Cretaceous (Cenomanian)	Burmese amber	Myanmar	A member of the family Boganiidae. Genus includes new species C. gei.	
Cretobrachygluta	Gen. et sp. nov.	Valid	Yin et al.	Cretaceous (late Albian or early Cenomanian)	Burmese amber	Myanmar	A rove beetle belonging to the subfamily Pselaphinae and the tribe Brachyglutini. The type species is C. laurasiensis.	
Cretochirus	Gen. et sp. nov	Valid	Yamamoto in Yamamoto & Takahashi	Late Cretaceous (Cenomanian)	Burmese amber	Myanmar	A rove beetle belonging to the subfamily Osoriinae and the tribe Leptochirini. Genus includes new species C. newtoni.	
Cretogyrus	Gen. et sp. nov	Valid	Zhao et al.	Late Cretaceous (Cenomanian)	Burmese amber	Myanmar	A whirligig beetle. Genus includes new species C. beuteli.	
Cretohlezkus	Gen. et sp. nov	Valid	Jałoszyński	Late Cretaceous (Cenomanian)	Burmese amber	Myanmar	A member of the family Eucinetidae. Genus includes new species C. alleni.	
Cretoliota	Gen. et sp. nov	Valid	Liu et al.	Late Cretaceous (Cenomanian)	Burmese amber	Myanmar	A member of the family Silvanidae. Genus includes new species C. cornutus.	
Cretolycus	Gen. et sp. nov	Valid	Tihelka, Huang & Cai	Late Cretaceous (Cenomanian)	Burmese amber	Myanmar	A member of the family Lycidae. Genus includes new species C. praecursor.	
Cretopityobius	Gen. et sp. nov	Valid	Otto	Late Cretaceous (Cenomanian)	Burmese amber	Myanmar	A click beetle belonging to the subfamily Pityobiinae. The type species is C. pankowskiorum.	
Cretoquadratus	Gen. et sp. nov	Valid	Chen	Late Cretaceous (Cenomanian)	Burmese amber	Myanmar	A member of the family Lymexylidae. Genus includes new species C. engeli. Li et al. (2022) transferred the species Raractocetus fossilis to the genus Cretoquadratus, but considered C. engeli to be a junior synonym of Raractocetus fossilis, resulting in a new combination Cretoquadratus fossilis.	
Cretotetracha	Gen. et sp. nov	Valid	Zhao et al.	Early Cretaceous	Yixian Formation	China	A tiger beetle. Genus includes new species C. grandis.	
Cyclodinus efficax	Sp. nov	Valid	Kirejtshuk in Kirejtshuk et al.	Late Eocene	Insect Limestone	United Kingdom	A species of Cyclodinus.	
Cyllodes argutus	Sp. nov	Valid	Kirejtshuk & Kurochkin in Kirejtshuk et al.	Late Eocene	Insect Limestone	United Kingdom	A species of Cyllodes.	
Damzenia	Gen. et sp. nov	Valid	Alekseev in Alekseev & Alekseev	Eocene	Baltic amber	Russia (Kaliningrad Oblast)	A member of the family Zopheridae belonging to the subfamily Colydiinae and the tribe Gempylodini. The type species is D. groehni.	
Damzenius	Gen. et sp. nov	Valid	Bukejs	Eocene	Baltic amber	Russia (Kaliningrad Oblast)	A leaf beetle belonging to the subfamily Lamprosomatinae. The type species is D. anitae.	
Dasytes ochraceus	Sp. nov	Valid	Tshernyshev	Late Eocene	Baltic amber	Europe (Baltic Sea region)	A species of Dasytes.	
Davidaltica	Gen. et sp. nov	Valid	Nadein in Nadein & Perkovsky	Early Eocene	Cambay amber	India	A flea beetle. Genus includes new species D. cambayensis.	
Davidraenites	Gen. et 3 sp. nov	Valid	Kirejtshuk in Kirejtshuk et al.	Late Eocene	Insect Limestone	United Kingdom	A member of the family Hydraenidae. Genus includes new species D. gratshevi, D. interruptus and D. spurcus.	
Derelomus miocaenicus	Sp. nov	Valid	Legalov	Early Miocene	Dominican amber	Dominican Republic	A member of the family Curculionidae belonging to the subfamily Curculioninae.	
Dignoptinus	Gen. et comb. nov	Valid	Alekseev, Bukejs & Bellés	Middle to late Eocene	Baltic amber	Europe (southern coast of the Baltic Sea)	A spider beetle. The type species is "Dignomus" regiomontanus Alekseev (2014).	
Diminudon	Gen. et 2 sp. nov	Valid	Żyła, Yamamoto & Shaw	Late Cretaceous (Cenomanian)	Burmese amber	Myanmar	A rove beetle belonging to the subfamily Paederinae. Genus includes new species D. schomannae and D. kachinensis.	
Dorytomus bukejsi	Sp. nov	Valid	Legalov	Eocene	Baltic amber	Europe (Baltic Sea region)	A species of Dorytomus.	
Dorytomus groehni	Sp. nov	Valid	Bukejs & Legalov	Late Eocene	Baltic amber	Russia (Kaliningrad Oblast)	A species of Dorytomus.	
Dorytomus korotyaevi	Sp. nov	Valid	Legalov	Eocene	Baltic amber	Europe (Baltic Sea region)	A species of Dorytomus.	
Dorytomus vlaskini	Sp. nov	Valid	Legalov, Nazarenko & Perkovsky	Eocene	Rovno amber	Ukraine	A species of Dorytomus.	
Eckfelderolispa	Gen. et 3 sp. nov	Valid	Legalov & Wappler	Eocene	Eckfelder Maar	Germany	A member of the family Brentidae. Genus includes new species E. petrefacta, E. perita and E. manderschieta. Announced in 2019; the final version of the article naming it was published in 2021.	
Electrocossonus	Gen. et sp. nov	Valid	Legalov	Eocene	Baltic amber	Europe (Baltic Sea region)	A member of the family Curculionidae belonging to the subfamily Cossoninae and the tribe Dryotribini. The type species is E. kirejtshuki.	
Electrorhinus	Gen. et sp. nov	Valid	Legalov	Eocene	Baltic amber	Europe (Baltic Sea region)	A member of the family Curculionidae belonging to the subfamily Molytinae and the tribe Aedemonini. The type species is E. friedhelmi.	
Electrotribus rarus	Sp. nov	Valid	Legalov	Eocene	Baltic amber	Europe (Baltic Sea region)	A member of the family Curculionidae belonging to the subfamily Molytinae and the tribe Acicnemidini.	
Electroxyra	Gen. et comb. nov	Valid	Gimmel et al.	Late Cretaceous (Cenomanian)	Burmese amber	Myanmar	A member of the family Cyclaxyridae; a new genus for "Cyclaxyra" cretacea Wu, Li & Ding (2018).	
Electrumeretes	Gen. et sp. nov	Valid	Peris & Jelínek	Late Cretaceous (Cenomanian)	Burmese amber	Myanmar	Originally described as a member of the family Kateretidae; subsequently argued to be a sap beetle belonging to the subfamily Apophisandrinae or a member of the separate family Apophisandridae. Genus includes new species E. birmanicus.	
Electruphilus	Gen. et sp. nov	Valid	Balke, Toledo & Hendrich in Balke et al.	Eocene	Bitterfeld amber	Germany	A member of the family Dytiscidae belonging to the subfamily Laccophilinae and the tribe Laccophilini. The type species is E. wendeli.	
Elektrokleinia	Gen. et sp. nov	Valid	Ellenberger & Fanti	Late Cretaceous (Cenomanian)	Burmese amber	Myanmar	A soldier beetle. Genus includes new species E. picta.	
Eolimnebius	Gen. et sp. nov	Valid	Kirejtshuk in Kirejtshuk et al.	Late Eocene	Insect Limestone	United Kingdom	A member of the family Hydraenidae. Genus includes new species E. fossilis.	
Eolophorus	Gen. et comb. nov	Valid	Brunke, Żyła & Solodovnikov in Brunke et al.	Eocene	Baltic amber	Europe (Baltic Sea region)	A rove beetle belonging to the subfamily Staphylininae and the tribe Staphylinini. The type species is "Acylophorus" hoffeinsorum Żyła & Solodovnikov (2017).	
Eoropseudauletes	Gen. et sp. nov	Valid	Kania & Legalov	Eocene	Baltic amber	Europe (Baltic Sea region)	A member of the family Rhynchitidae. Genus includes new species E. plucinskii.	
Ephistemus crassipes	Sp. nov	Disputed	Lyubarsky & Perkovsky	Late Eocene	Baltic amber	Russia (Kaliningrad Oblast)	Originally described as a species of Ephistemus. Gimmel & Szawaryn (2020) considered E. crassipes to be a junior synonym of the cyclaxyrid species Neolitochropus bedovoyi.	
Epuraea (Epuraea) kozlovi	Sp. nov	Valid	Kirejtshuk & Kurochkin in Kirejtshuk et al.	Late Eocene	Insect Limestone	United Kingdom	A species of Epuraea.	
Eucinetes nikolaevae	Sp. nov	Valid	Kirejtshuk & Ponomarenko in Kirejtshuk et al.	Late Eocene	Insect Limestone	United Kingdom	A member of the family Eucinetidae.	
Eusphalerum kanti	Sp. nov	Valid	Shavrin & Yamamoto	Eocene	Baltic amber	Europe (Baltic Sea region)	A species of Eusphalerum.	
Fallia palaeodominicana	Sp. nov	Valid	Szawaryn & Kupryjanowicz	Early to early Middle Miocene	La Toca Formation (Dominican amber)	Dominican Republic	A member of the family Discolomatidae.	
Falsogastrallus groehni	Sp. nov	Valid	Háva & Zahradník	Eocene	Baltic amber	Russia (Kaliningrad Oblast)	A species of Falsogastrallus.	
Gallopsis	Gen. et sp. nov	Valid	Legalov, Kirejtshuk & Nel	Paleocene		France	A leaf beetle. Genus includes new species G. perita.	
Gastrallus michalskii	Sp. nov	Valid	Zahradník & Háva	Eocene	Baltic amber	Poland	A species of Gastrallus.	
Geodromicus balticus	Sp. nov	Valid	Shavrin & Yamamoto	Eocene	Baltic amber	Russia (Kaliningrad Oblast)	A rove beetle belonging to the subfamily Omaliinae.	
Glaesotropis balticus	Sp. nov	Valid	Legalov	Eocene	Baltic amber	Europe (Baltic Sea region)	A member of the family Anthribidae belonging to the subfamily Anthribinae and the tribe Zygaenodini.	
Glesoconomorphus	Gen. et sp. nov	Valid	Alekseev, Pollock & Bukejs	Eocene	Baltic amber	Russia (Kaliningrad Oblast)	A member of the family Mycteridae. Genus includes new species G. nachzehrer.	
Gonialaena	Gen. et sp. nov	Valid	Nabozhenko, Bukejs & Telnov	Eocene	Baltic amber	Russia (Kaliningrad Oblast)	A darkling beetle belonging to the subfamily Lagriinae and to the new tribe Gonialaenini. Genus includes new species G. groehni.	
Gracilicupes minimus	Sp. nov	Valid	Strelnikova	Early Cretaceous		Russia	A member of the family Cupedidae.	
Groehnius	Gen. et 2 sp. nov	Valid	Bukejs & Legalov	Eocene	Baltic amber	Russia (Kaliningrad Oblast)	A member of the family Curculionidae belonging to the subfamily Curculioninae and the tribe Eugnomini. The type species is G. electrum; genus also includes G. parvum.	
Helochares fog	Sp. nov	Valid	Arriaga Varela et al.	Eocene	Baltic amber	Europe (Baltic Sea region)	A species of Helochares. Announced in 2019; the final version of the article naming it was published in 2021.	
Hemiquedius europaeus	Sp. nov	Valid	Brunke, Żyła & Solodovnikov in Brunke et al.	Middle Eocene	Baltic amber	Poland; Russia (Kaliningrad Oblast)	A rove beetle belonging to the subfamily Staphylininae and the tribe Staphylinini.	
Hister cerestensis	Sp. nov	Valid	Degallier, Garrouste & Nel	Oligocene		France	A species of Hister.	
Homocloeus popovi	Sp. nov	Valid	Legalov, Nazarenko & Perkovsky	Miocene	Mexican amber	Mexico	A member of the family Anthribidae.	
Hongipsectra	Gen. et sp. nov	Valid	Tihelka, Huang & Cai	Late Cretaceous (Cenomanian)	Burmese amber	Myanmar	A member of the family Brachypsectridae. Genus includes new species H. electrella.	
Hydraenites	Gen. et sp. nov	Valid	Kirejtshuk in Kirejtshuk et al.	Late Eocene	Insect Limestone	United Kingdom	A member of the family Hydraenidae. Genus includes new species H. gracilimmus.	
Hydrochara woodwardi	Sp. nov	Valid	Ponomarenko & Soriano in Kirejtshuk et al.	Late Eocene	Insect Limestone	United Kingdom	A species of Hydrochara.	
Ilybius gratshevi	Sp. nov	Valid	Ponomarenko in Kirejtshuk et al.	Late Eocene	Insect Limestone	United Kingdom	A species of Ilybius.	
Isomira hoffeinsorum	Sp. nov	In press	Nabozhenko, Chigray & Bukejs	Eocene	Baltic amber	Europe (Baltic Sea region)	A species of Isomira.	
Jantarhinus	Gen. et sp. nov	Valid	Legalov, Kirejtshuk & Nel	Eocene	Oise amber	France	A member of the family Curculionidae. Genus includes new species J. compressus.	
Jantaronosik	Gen. et sp. nov	Valid	Legalov, Kirejtshuk & Nel	Eocene	Oise amber	France	A member of the family Curculionidae. Genus includes new species J. nebulosus.	
Japanolaccophilus beatificus	Sp. nov	Valid	Balke & Hendrich	Eocene	Baltic amber	Russia (Kaliningrad Oblast)	A species of Japanolaccophilus.	
Juraniscus	Gen. et sp. nov	Valid	Kolibáč & Huang	Middle Jurassic (Callovian)	Haifanggou Formation	China	A member of Cleroidea of uncertain phylogenetic placement. The type species is J. majeri.	
Jurassophytum	Gen. et sp. nov	Valid	Yu, Ślipiński & Pang in Yu et al.	Middle Jurassic	Daohugou Beds	China	A member of the family Cerophytidae. Genus includes new species J. cleidecostae.	
Kargalarva	Gen. et sp. nov	Valid	Prokin, Ponomarenko & Kirejtshuk	Late Permian		Russia	An aquatic larva of a beetle. Genus includes new species K. permosialis.	
Katyacantharis	Gen. et sp. nov	Valid	Kazantsev & Perkovsky	Late Cretaceous (Cenomanian)	Agdzhakend amber	Azerbaijan	A soldier beetle. Genus includes new species K. zherikhini.	
Koreagrypnus	Gen. et sp. nov	Valid	Sohn & Nam in Sohn et al.	Early Cretaceous (Albian)	Jinju Formation	South Korea	A click beetle. The type species is K. jinju.	
Kresnikus	Gen. et sp. nov	Valid	Tihelka, Huang & Cai	Late Cretaceous (Cenomanian)	Burmese amber	Myanmar	A member of the family Trogidae. Genus includes new species K. beynoni.	
Kryzhanovskiana	Gen. et sp. nov	Valid	Kataev et al.	Late Cretaceous (Cenomanian)	Burmese amber	Myanmar	An ant nest beetle belonging to the tribe Metriini. Genus includes new species K. olegi.	
Laevisaurus	Gen. et 2 sp. nov	Valid	Brunke, Żyła & Solodovnikov in Brunke et al.	Middle Eocene	Baltic amber	Russia (Kaliningrad Oblast)	A rove beetle belonging to the subfamily Staphylininae and the tribe Staphylinini. The type species is L. robustus; genus also includes L. gracilis.	
Lepidomma	Gen. et sp. nov	Disputed	Jarzembowski, Wang & Zheng	Late Cretaceous (Cenomanian)	Burmese amber	Myanmar	An ommatine archostematan. Genus includes new species L. tianae. Kirejtshuk (2020) considered Lepidomma to be a junior synonym of the genus Clessidromma, though the author maintained L. tianae as a distinct species within the latter genus.	
Limalophus poinari	Sp. nov	Valid	Legalov	Eocene	Baltic amber	Europe (Baltic Sea region)	A member of the family Curculionidae belonging to the subfamily Entiminae and the tribe Tropiphorini.	
Longicrusa	Gen. et sp. nov	In press	Tihelka, Huang & Cai	Late Cretaceous (Cenomanian)	Burmese amber	Myanmar	A member of the family Melandryidae. Genus includes new species L. jaracimrmani.	
Lycocerus jesperibuchi	Sp. nov	Valid	Fanti & Damgaard	Eocene	Prussian Formation (Baltic amber)	Russia (Kaliningrad Oblast)	A soldier beetle.	
Macropunctum rossi	Sp. nov	Valid	Alexeev in Kirejtshuk et al.	Late Eocene	Insect Limestone	United Kingdom	A click beetle.	
Malthodes andreasiabelei	Sp. nov	Valid	Fanti	Middle Eocene	Bitterfeld amber	Germany	A species of Malthodes.	
Malthodes gedanicus	Sp. nov	Valid	Fanti & Sontag	Eocene	Baltic amber	Russia (Kaliningrad Oblast)	A species of Malthodes.	
Malthodes nublar	Sp. nov	Valid	Kupryjanowicz & Fanti	Eocene (Lutetian to Priabonian)	Baltic amber	Russia (Kaliningrad Oblast)	A species of Malthodes.	
Malthodes neumanni	Sp. nov	Valid	Fanti	Middle Eocene	Bitterfeld amber	Germany	A species of Malthodes.	
Malthodes tognettii	Sp. nov	Valid	Parisi & Fanti	Eocene	Baltic amber	Russia (Kaliningrad Oblast)	A species of Malthodes.	
Malthodes (Libertimalthodes)	Subgen. et 2 sp. nov	Valid	Kupryjanowicz & Fanti	Eocene (Lutetian to Priabonian)	Baltic amber	Russia (Kaliningrad Oblast)	A subgenus of Malthodes. The type species of the subgenus is new species M. elytratus Kupryjanowicz & Fanti (2019); the subgenus also includes M. aphidiphagus Fanti & Michalski (2018), as well as new species M. spaceae Fanti (2019).	
Mantimalthinus bartholini	Sp. nov	Valid	Fanti & Damgaard	Eocene	Prussian Formation (Baltic amber)	Russia (Kaliningrad Oblast)	A soldier beetle.	
Mazurieugnomus	Gen. et sp. nov	Valid	Legalov	Eocene	Baltic amber	Europe (Baltic Sea region)	A member of the family Curculionidae belonging to the subfamily Curculioninae and the tribe Eugnomini. The type species is M. pilosus.	
Megalithomerus	Gen. et sp. nov	Valid	Sohn & Nam in Sohn et al.	Early Cretaceous (Albian)	Jinju Formation	South Korea	A click beetle. The type species is M. magohalmii.	
Mesocordylus dominicus	Sp. nov	Valid	Legalov	Early Miocene	Dominican amber	Dominican Republic	A member of the family Curculionidae belonging to the subfamily Dryophthorinae.	
Mesopassandra	Gen. et sp. nov	Valid	Jin et al.	Late Cretaceous (Cenomanian)	Burmese amber	Myanmar	A member of the family Passandridae. Genus includes new species M. keyao.	
Metahelotella monochromata	Sp. nov	Valid	Liu et al.	Late Cretaceous (Cenomanian)	Burmese amber	Myanmar	A member of the family Helotidae. Subsequently made the type species of the separate genus Mesohelotopsis.	
Metacoxites	Gen. et sp. nov	Valid	Kirejtshuk in Kirejtshuk et al.	Late Eocene	Insect Limestone	United Kingdom	A member of the family Hydraenidae. Genus includes new species M. ventritalis.	
Mimoplatycis marchettii	Sp. nov	Valid	Parisi & Fanti	Eocene	Baltic amber	Europe (Baltic Sea region)	A soldier beetle.	
Mysteriomorphus	Gen. et sp. nov	Valid	Alekseev & Ellenberger	Late Cretaceous (Cenomanian)	Burmese amber	Myanmar	A member of Elateriformia belonging to the new family Mysteriomorphidae. Genus includes new species M. pelevini.	Mysteriomorphus pelevini
Necromeropsis	Gen. et sp. nov	Valid	Yu, Ślipiński & Pang in Yu et al.	Late Cretaceous (Cenomanian)	Burmese amber	Myanmar	A member of the family Cerophytidae. Genus includes new species N. minutus.	
Neothanes europaeus	Sp. nov	Valid	Ponomarenko in Kirejtshuk et al.	Late Eocene	Insect Limestone	United Kingdom	A ground beetle.	
Nitorus succinius	Sp. nov	Valid	Telnov & Bukejs	Eocene	Baltic amber	Russia (Kaliningrad Oblast)	A member of the family Anthicidae belonging to the subfamily Anthicinae.	
Nosodendron cretaceum	Sp. nov	Valid	Deng et al.	Late Cretaceous (Cenomanian)	Burmese amber	Myanmar	A member of the family Nosodendridae. Originally described as a species of Nosodendron, but subsequently transferred to the separate genus Archaenosodendron.	
Notaepytus quisqueya	Sp. nov	Valid	Keller & Skelley	Miocene	Dominican amber	Dominican Republic	A member of the family Erotylidae belonging to the subfamily Erotylinae and the tribe Tritomini.	
Notocupes khasurtyiensis	Sp. nov	Valid	Strelnikova	Early Cretaceous		Russia	Originally described as a member of the family Cupedidae and a species of Notocupes; Kirejtshuk (2020) transferred this species to the ommatine genus Zygadenia.	
Notocupes neli	Sp. nov	Valid	Tihelka, Huang & Cai	Late Cretaceous (Cenomanian)	Burmese amber	Myanmar	Originally described as a member of the family Cupedidae and a species of Notocupes; Kirejtshuk (2020) transferred this species to the ommatine genus Echinocups, but Li et al. (2023) transferred it back to the genus Notocupes.	
Ochthebius rossi	Sp. nov	Valid	Kirejtshuk in Kirejtshuk et al.	Late Eocene	Insect Limestone	United Kingdom	A species of Ochthebius.	
Octotemnites	Gen. et sp. nov	Valid	Kirejtshuk in Kirejtshuk et al.	Late Eocene	Insect Limestone	United Kingdom	A member of the family Ciidae. Genus includes new species O. sepultus.	
Oisecalles	Gen. et sp. nov	Valid	Legalov, Kirejtshuk & Nel	Eocene	Oise amber	France	A member of the family Curculionidae. Genus includes new species O. latosquamosus.	
Oiserhinus	Gen. et sp. nov	Valid	Legalov, Kirejtshuk & Nel	Eocene	Oise amber	France	A member of the family Anthribidae. Genus includes new species O. insolitus.	
Omineus febribilis	Sp. nov	Valid	Alekseev, Pollock & Bukejs	Eocene	Baltic amber	Russia (Kaliningrad Oblast)	A member of the family Mycteridae.	
Orthoperites	Gen. et sp. nov	Valid	Kirejtshuk & Kurochkin in Kirejtshuk et al.	Late Eocene	Insect Limestone	United Kingdom	A member of the family Corylophidae. Genus includes new species O. antiquus.	
Pactopus burmensis	Sp. nov	Valid	Muona	Late Cretaceous (Cenomanian)	Burmese amber	Myanmar	A species of Pactopus.	
Palaeohelota	Gen. et sp. nov	Valid	Liu et al.	Early Cretaceous	Yixian Formation	China	A member of the family Helotidae. Genus includes new species P. parva.	
Palaeorhamphus damzeni	Sp. nov	Valid	Legalov	Eocene	Baltic amber	Europe (Baltic Sea region)	A member of the family Curculionidae belonging to the subfamily Curculioninae and the tribe Rhamphini.	
Palaeorhamphus eichmanni	Sp. nov	Valid	Legalov	Eocene	Baltic amber	Europe (Baltic Sea region)	A member of the family Curculionidae belonging to the subfamily Curculioninae and the tribe Rhamphini.	
Paleodontopus	Gen. et sp. nov	Valid	Legalov	Eocene	Baltic amber	Europe (Baltic Sea region)	A member of the family Curculionidae belonging to the subfamily Curculioninae and the tribe Camarotini. The type species is P. smirnovae.	
Paleoendeitoma buryi	Sp. nov	Valid	Háva	Late Cretaceous (Cenomanian)	Burmese amber	Myanmar	A member of the family Zopheridae belonging to the subfamily Colydiinae and the tribe Synchitini.	
Paonaupactus gracilis	Sp. nov	Valid	Legalov, Nazarenko & Perkovsky	Eocene	Rovno amber	Ukraine	A member of the family Curculionidae belonging to the subfamily Entiminae.	
Paonaupactus katyae	Sp. nov	Valid	Legalov, Nazarenko & Perkovsky	Eocene	Rovno amber	Ukraine	A member of the family Curculionidae belonging to the subfamily Entiminae.	
Paralichas striatopunctatus	Sp. nov	Valid	Kirejtshuk in Kirejtshuk et al.	Late Eocene	Insect Limestone	United Kingdom	A member of the family Ptilodactylidae.	
Paraphloeostiba morosa	Sp. nov	Valid	Shavrin & Yamamoto	Eocene	Baltic amber	Russia (Kaliningrad Oblast)	A rove beetle belonging to the subfamily Omaliinae.	
(?) Passandra plenaria	Sp. nov	Valid	Ponomarenko, Kovalev & Nel	Paleocene		France	A member of the family Passandridae, possibly a species of Passandra.	
Pentodon dorcus	Sp. nov	Valid	Krell in Kirejtshuk et al.	Late Eocene	Insect Limestone	United Kingdom	A species of Pentodon.	
Periosomerus	Gen. et sp. nov	Valid	Poinar, Brown & Legalov	Late Cretaceous (Cenomanian)	Burmese amber	Myanmar	A relative of the New York weevil. Genus includes new species P. tanyorhynchus.	
Phenolia (Lasiodites) vanescens	Sp. nov	Valid	Kirejtshuk & Kurochkin in Kirejtshuk et al.	Late Eocene	Insect Limestone	United Kingdom	A species of Phenolia.	
Photinus kazantsevi	Sp. nov	Valid	Alekseev	Eocene	Baltic amber	Russia (Kaliningrad Oblast)	Originally described as a species of Photinus; subsequently transferred to the family Omethidae and to the genus Electromethes.	
Phyllodrepa daedali	Sp. nov	Valid	Shavrin & Yamamoto	Eocene	Baltic amber	Russia (Kaliningrad Oblast)	A rove beetle belonging to the subfamily Omaliinae.	
Phyllodrepa icari	Sp. nov	Valid	Shavrin & Yamamoto	Eocene	Baltic amber	Poland	A rove beetle belonging to the subfamily Omaliinae.	
Plateumaris robustus	Sp. nov	Valid	Kurochkin & Kirejtshuk in Kirejtshuk et al.	Late Eocene	Insect Limestone	United Kingdom	A species of Plateumaris.	
Plateumaris (Necrodexis)	Subgen. et sp. nov	Valid	Kurochkin & Kirejtshuk in Kirejtshuk et al.	Late Eocene	Insect Limestone	United Kingdom	A subgenus of Plateumaris. The subgenus includes new species P. (N.) rubiconis.	
Plateumaris wightensis	Sp. nov	Valid	Kurochkin & Kirejtshuk in Kirejtshuk et al.	Late Eocene	Insect Limestone	United Kingdom	A species of Plateumaris.	
Podistra (Absidia) quies	Sp. nov	Valid	Fanti & Walker	Oligocene	Rott Formation	Germany	A soldier beetle.	
Polliniretes	Gen. et sp. nov	Valid	Peris & Jelínek	Late Cretaceous (Cenomanian)	Burmese amber	Myanmar	Originally described as a member of the family Kateretidae; subsequently argued to be a sap beetle belonging to the subfamily Apophisandrinae or a member of the separate family Apophisandridae. Genus includes new species P. penalveri.	
Polydrusus zherikhini	Sp. nov	Valid	Legalov	Eocene	Baltic amber	Europe (Baltic Sea region)	A species of Polydrusus.	
Potergus superbus	Sp. nov	Valid	Muona	Eocene	Baltic amber	Russia (Kaliningrad Oblast)	A member of the family Throscidae.	
Priacma megapuncta	Sp. nov	Valid	Li & Cai in Li et al.	Late Cretaceous (Cenomanian)	Burmese amber	Myanmar	A species of Priacma.	
Primaevomordellida	Gen. et sp. nov	Valid	Bao et al.	Late Cretaceous (Cenomanian)	Burmese amber	Myanmar	A member of the family Mordellidae. Genus includes new species P. burmitina.	
Priochirus thayerae	Sp. nov	Valid	Yamamoto in Yamamoto & Takahashi	Late Cretaceous (Cenomanian)	Burmese amber	Myanmar	A species of Priochirus.	
Priscaplectus	Gen. et 2 sp. nov	Valid	Yin, Chandler & Cai	Late Cretaceous (Cenomanian)	Burmese amber	Myanmar	A rove beetle belonging to the subfamily Pselaphinae. Genus includes new species P. carinatus and P. grandiceps.	
Prometopia europaea	Sp. nov	Valid	Kirejtshuk & Kurochkin in Kirejtshuk et al.	Late Eocene	Insect Limestone	United Kingdom	A species of Prometopia.	
Promyrmister	Gen. et sp. nov	Valid	Zhou, Ślipiński & Parker in Zhou et al.	Late Cretaceous (Cenomanian)	Burmese amber	Myanmar	A member of the family Histeridae belonging to the subfamily Haeteriinae. The type species is P. kistneri.	Promyrmister kistneri
Protoliota	Gen. et sp. nov	Valid	Liu et al.	Late Cretaceous (Cenomanian)	Burmese amber	Myanmar	A member of the family Silvanidae. Genus includes new species P. antennatus.	
Protolycus	Gen. et sp. nov	Valid	Kazantsev	Eocene	Baltic amber	Europe (Gdańsk Bay region)	A member of the family Lycidae. Genus includes new species P. gedaniensis.	
Protomalthus	Gen. et sp. nov	Valid	Tihelka, Huang & Cai	Late Cretaceous (Cenomanian)	Burmese amber	Myanmar	A relative of the telephone-pole beetle. Genus includes new species P. burmaticus.	
Protorthaltica	Gen. et sp. nov	Valid	Nadein in Nadein & Perkovsky	Early Eocene	Cambay amber	India	A flea beetle. Genus includes new species P. setosella.	
Pseudoergania	Gen. et sp. nov	Valid	Legalov	Eocene	Baltic amber	Europe (Baltic Sea region)	A member of the family Curculionidae belonging to the tribe Curculionini. Genus includes new species P. perkovskyi.	
Pseudomecocerus	Gen. et sp. nov	Valid	Legalov	Eocene	Baltic amber	Europe (Baltic Sea region)	A member of the family Anthribidae belonging to the subfamily Anthribinae and the tribe Mecocerini. The type species is P. alekseevi.	
Pseudomesauletes groehni	Sp. nov	Valid	Bukejs & Legalov	Late Eocene	Rovno amber	Ukraine	A member of the family Rhynchitidae.	
Pseudothroscus	Gen. et sp. nov	Valid	Muona	Eocene	Baltic amber	Europe (Baltic Sea region)	A member of the family Throscidae. The type species is P. balticus.	
Pycnomerus agtsteinicus	Sp. nov	Valid	Bukejs, Alekseev & McKellar in Bukejs et al.	Eocene	Baltic amber	Russia (Kaliningrad Oblast)	A species of Pycnomerus.	
Raractocetus balticus	Sp. nov	Valid	Yamamoto	Eocene	Baltic amber	Russia (Kaliningrad Oblast)	A ship-timber beetle belonging to the subfamily Atractocerinae. Transferred to the genus Cretoquadratus by Li et al. (2022) and to the genus Lymexylopsis by Kirejtshuk (2025).	
Raractocetus extinctus	Sp. nov	Valid	Yamamoto	Late Cretaceous (Cenomanian)	Burmese amber	Myanmar	A ship-timber beetle belonging to the subfamily Atractocerinae. Transferred to the genus Cretoquadratus by Li et al. (2022) and to the genus Eoractocetinus by Kirejtshuk (2025).	
Raractocetus fossilis	Sp. nov	Valid	Yamamoto	Late Cretaceous (Cenomanian)	Burmese amber	Myanmar	A ship-timber beetle belonging to the subfamily Atractocerinae. Transferred to the genus Cretoquadratus by Li et al. (2022) and to the genus Eoractocetinus by Kirejtshuk (2025).	
Rhagonycha carolynae	Sp. nov	Valid	Fanti & Walker	Oligocene	Rott Formation	Germany	A species of Rhagonycha.	
Rhagonycha ultramundana	Sp. nov	Valid	Fanti & Walker	Oligocene	Rott Formation	Germany	A species of Rhagonycha.	
Rhinoporkus	Gen. et sp. nov	Valid	Legalov, Kirejtshuk & Nel	Eocene	Oise amber	France	A member of the family Curculionidae. Genus includes new species R. gratiosus.	
Ripidinelia	Gen. et sp. nov	Valid	Batelka & Prokop	Late Cretaceous (Cenomanian)	Burmese amber	Myanmar	A member of the family Ripiphoridae belonging to the subfamily Ripidiinae. Genus includes new species R. burmiticola.	
Rovnoleptochromus balticus	Sp. nov	Valid	Jałoszyński & Yamamoto	Late Eocene	Baltic amber	Russia (Kaliningrad Oblast)	An ant-like stone beetle.	
Rovnoslonik	Gen. et sp. nov	Valid	Legalov, Nazarenko & Perkovsky	Eocene	Rovno amber	Ukraine	A member of the family Curculionidae belonging to the subfamily Dryophthorinae. Genus includes new species R. damzeni.	
Samlandotoma	Gen. et sp. nov	Valid	Alekseev	Eocene	Baltic amber	Russia (Kaliningrad Oblast)	Originally described as a member of the family Ripiphoridae; Batelka (2021) considered it to be a member of Tenebrionoidea of uncertain phylogenetic placement, and Alekseev, Háva & Bukejs (2025) transferred it to the tribe Scraptiini within the family Scraptiidae. The type species is S. seidlitzi.	
Sanaungulus christensenae	Sp. nov	Valid	Fanti & Damgaard	Late Cretaceous (Cenomanian)	Burmese amber	Myanmar	A soldier beetle	
Sanaungulus fabriciusi	Sp. nov	Valid	Fanti & Damgaard	Late Cretaceous (Cenomanian)	Burmese amber	Myanmar	A soldier beetle	
Sanaungulus strungei	Sp. nov	Valid	Fanti & Damgaard	Late Cretaceous (Cenomanian)	Burmese amber	Myanmar	A soldier beetle. Originally described as a species of Sanaungulus, but subsequently transferred to the genus Brevipterus.	
Sanaungulus troelsikloevedali	Sp. nov	Valid	Fanti & Damgaard	Late Cretaceous (Cenomanian)	Burmese amber	Myanmar	A soldier beetle	
Sciabregma squamosa	Sp. nov	Valid	Legalov, Kirejtshuk & Nel	Eocene	Oise amber	France	A member of the family Curculionidae.	
Scirtes calcariferens	Sp. nov	Valid	Kirejtshuk & Ponomarenko in Kirejtshuk et al.	Late Eocene	Insect Limestone	United Kingdom	A species of Scirtes.	
Scirtes khnzoryani	Sp. nov	Valid	Kirejtshuk & Ponomarenko in Kirejtshuk et al.	Late Eocene	Insect Limestone	United Kingdom	A species of Scirtes.	
Scirtes metepisternalis	Sp. nov	Valid	Kirejtshuk & Ponomarenko in Kirejtshuk et al.	Late Eocene	Insect Limestone	United Kingdom	A species of Scirtes.	
Scirtes wightensis	Sp. nov	Valid	Kirejtshuk & Ponomarenko in Kirejtshuk et al.	Late Eocene	Insect Limestone	United Kingdom	A species of Scirtes.	
Scydmaenus minor	Sp. nov	Valid	Yin & Cai	Late Cretaceous (Cenomanian)	Burmese amber	Myanmar	An ant-like stone beetle.	
Serangium kalandyki	Sp. nov	Valid	Szawaryn	Eocene	Baltic amber	Europe (Baltic Sea region)	A member of the family Coccinellidae.	
Silis lombardii	Sp. nov	Valid	Parisi & Fanti	Eocene	Baltic amber	Russia (Kaliningrad Oblast)	A species of Silis.	
Sinoeuglypheus	Gen. et sp. nov	Disputed	Yu et al.	Middle Jurassic	Jiulongshan Formation	China	Originally described as a member of the family Belidae. Genus includes new species S. daohugouensis. Legalov (2022) considered the genus Sinoeuglypheus to be a junior synonym of the nemonychid genus Belonotaris, though the author maintained S. daohugouensis as a distinct species within the latter genus.	
Sinomelyris	Gen. et sp. nov	Valid	Kolibáč & Huang	Middle Jurassic (Callovian)	Haifanggou Formation	China	A member of the family Melyridae. The type species is S. praedecessor.	
Smicrips fudalai	Sp. nov	Valid	Kupryjanowicz, Lyubarsky & Perkovsky	Late Eocene	Rovno amber	Ukraine	A species of Smicrips.	
Spaniophagus	Gen. et sp. nov	Valid	Lyubarsky & Perkovsky	Late Eocene	Baltic amber	Russia (Kaliningrad Oblast)	A member of the family Cryptophagidae. The type species is S. hoffeinsae.	
Sparedrus archaicus	Sp. nov	Valid	Vitali & Ellenberger	Late Cretaceous (Cenomanian)	Burmese amber	Myanmar	A species of Sparedrus.	
Spercheus punctatus	Sp. nov	Valid	Ponomarenko in Kirejtshuk et al.	Late Eocene	Insect Limestone	United Kingdom	A member of the family Spercheidae.	
Spercheus wightensis	Sp. nov	Valid	Ponomarenko in Kirejtshuk et al.	Late Eocene	Insect Limestone	United Kingdom	A member of the family Spercheidae.	
Sphaeriestes eichmanni	Sp. nov	Valid	Alekseev	Eocene	Baltic amber	Russia (Kaliningrad Oblast)	A species of Sphaeriestes.	
Sphaerothorax uenoi	Sp. nov	Valid	Cai & Lawrence in Cai et al.	Late Cretaceous (Cenomanian)	Burmese amber	Myanmar	A member of the family Clambidae.	
Statira baltica	Sp. nov	Valid	Telnov, Bukejs & Merkl	Eocene	Baltic amber	Russia (Kaliningrad Oblast)	A darkling beetle belonging to the subfamily Lagriinae.	
Steropes eleticinoides	Sp. nov	Valid	Telnov & Bukejs	Eocene	Baltic amber	Russia (Kaliningrad Oblast)	A member of the family Anthicidae belonging to the subfamily Steropinae.	
Taimyraphes	Gen. et sp. nov	Valid	Jałoszyński & Perkovsky	Late Cretaceous (Santonian)	Taimyr amber	Russia	An ant-like stone beetle belonging to the tribe Glandulariini. Genus includes new species T. microscopicus.	
Telmatophilus britannicus	Sp. nov	Valid	Kirejtshuk & Kurochkin in Kirejtshuk et al.	Late Eocene	Insect Limestone	United Kingdom	Originally described as a species of Telmatophilus; Lyubarsky & Perkovsky (2020) transferred it to the genus Cryptophilus.	
Themus (?Telephorops) polyaki	Sp. nov	Valid	Kirejtshuk in Kirejtshuk et al.	Late Eocene	Insect Limestone	United Kingdom	A soldier beetle.	
Tolstonosik	Gen. et sp. nov	Valid	Legalov, Kirejtshuk & Nel	Eocene	Oise amber	France	A member of the family Curculionidae. Genus includes new species T. oisensis.	
Tomoderus saecularis	Sp. nov	Valid	Telnov & Bukejs	Eocene	Baltic amber	Russia (Kaliningrad Oblast)	A species of Tomoderus.	
Trixagus barclayi	Sp. nov	Valid	Kirejtshuk in Kirejtshuk et al.	Late Eocene	Insect Limestone	United Kingdom	A species of Trixagus.	
Trixagus parvulus	Sp. nov	Valid	Muona	Eocene	Baltic amber	Russia (Kaliningrad Oblast)	A species of Trixagus.	
Tyrannothroscus	Gen. et sp. nov	Valid	Muona	Eocene	Baltic amber	Russia (Kaliningrad Oblast)	A member of the family Throscidae. The type species is T. rex.	
Tytthonyx stadili	Sp. nov	Valid	Fanti & Damgaard	Miocene	La Toca Formation (Dominican amber)	Dominican Republic	A species of Tytthonyx.	
Vetatractocerus	Gen. et sp. nov	Valid	Yamamoto	Late Cretaceous (Cenomanian)	Burmese amber	Myanmar	A ship-timber beetle belonging to the subfamily Atractocerinae. The type species is V. burmiticus.	
Waidelotus	Gen. et sp. nov	Valid	Bukejs, Alekseev & Pollock	Eocene	Baltic amber	Russia (Kaliningrad Oblast)	A fire-coloured beetle. Genus includes new species W. hoffeinsorum.	
Wuhua peregrina	Sp. nov	Valid	Bao et al.	Jurassic	Daohugou Beds	China	A member of Tenebrionoidea belonging to the group Praemordellinae.	
Xyletinus arturi	Sp. nov	Valid	Háva & Zahradník	Eocene	Baltic amber	Poland	A species of Xyletinus.	
Xyletinus barsevskisi	Sp. nov	Valid	Alekseev & Bukejs	Eocene	Baltic amber	Russia (Kaliningrad Oblast)	A species of Xyletinus.	
Xyletinus besseli	Sp. nov	Valid	Alekseev & Bukejs	Eocene	Baltic amber	Russia (Kaliningrad Oblast)	A species of Xyletinus.	
Xyletinus michalskii	Sp. nov	Valid	Háva & Zahradník	Eocene	Baltic amber	Poland	A species of Xyletinus.	
Xyletinus thienemanni	Sp. nov	Valid	Alekseev & Bukejs	Eocene	Baltic amber	Russia (Kaliningrad Oblast)	A species of Xyletinus.	
Zimmiorhinus	Nom. nov	Valid	Clarke & Oberprieler	Late Cretaceous (Cenomanian)	Burmese amber	Myanmar	A weevil belonging to the family Mesophyletidae and the subfamily Mesophyletinae; a replacement name for Elwoodius Clarke & Oberprieler in Clarke et al. (2018).	

=== Dictyopterans ===
Name	Novelty	Status	Authors	Age	Type locality	Country	Notes	Images
Anaplecta vega	Sp. nov	Valid	Barna, Šmídová & Coutiño José	Early Miocene	Mexican amber	Mexico	A cockroach belonging to the family Ectobiidae and the subfamily Anaplectinae.	
Anenev	Gen. et sp. nov	Valid	Vršanský, Oružinský, Sendi, Choufani, El-Halabi & Azar in Vršanský et al.	Early Cretaceous		Syria	A cockroach. Originally described as a member of the family Blattidae; Qiu et al. (2020) considered it to be a cockroach of uncertain phylogenetic placement. The type species is A. asrev.	
Anisotermes	Gen. et sp. nov	Valid	Zhao et al.	Late Cretaceous (Cenomanian)	Burmese amber	Myanmar	A member of the family Mastotermitidae. Genus includes new species A. xiai.	
Balta protosimilis	Sp. nov	Valid	Ross	Eocene (Priabonian)	Insect Limestone	United Kingdom	A cockroach belonging to the family Ectobiidae.	
Barona	Gen. et sp. nov	Valid	Calisto & Piñeiro	Late Carboniferous or Early Permian	Mangrullo Formation	Uruguay	A cockroach of uncertain phylogenetic placement. The type species is B. arcuata.	
Bimodala	Gen. et sp. nov	Valid	Šmídová in Vršanský et al.	Late Cretaceous (Cenomanian)	Burmese amber	Myanmar	A cockroach of uncertain phylogenetic placement. Originally described as a member of the family Blattidae; Qiu et al. (2020) transferred it to the family Corydiidae. The type species is B. ohmkuhnlei.	
Cosmotermes	Gen. et 2 sp. nov	Valid	Zhao, Yin, Shih & Ren in Zhao et al.	Late Cretaceous (Cenomanian)	Burmese amber	Myanmar	A termite belonging to the family Stolotermitidae. The type species is C. multus; genus also includes C. opacus. Announced in 2019; the final version of the article naming it was published in 2020.	
Cryptoblatta	Gen. et sp. nov	Valid	Sendi & Azar in Vršanský et al.	Early Cretaceous (Barremian)	Lebanese amber	Lebanon	A member of Corydioidea belonging to the family Liberiblattinidae. The type species is C. aquatica.	
Formicamendax	Gen. et sp. nov	Valid	Hinkelman	Late Cretaceous (Cenomanian)	Burmese amber	Myanmar	A relative of Alienopterus. Genus includes new species F. vrsanskyi.	
Habroblattula laiyangensis	Sp. nov	Valid	Chen et al.	Early Cretaceous	Laiyang Formation	China	A cockroach belonging to the family Blattulidae.	
Huablattula	Gen. et 2 sp. nov	Valid	Qiu, Wang & Che	Late Cretaceous (Cenomanian)	Burmese amber	Myanmar	A cockroach belonging to the family Blattulidae. Genus includes new species H. hui and H. jiewenae.	
Hydrokhoohydra	Gen. et sp. nov	Valid	Vršanský in Vršanský et al.	Late Jurassic (Kimmeridgian) - Late Cretaceous (Cenomanian)	Karabastau Formation	Kazakhstan	A Liberiblattinidae. The type species is H. aquabella; genus also includes several unnamed species	
Jantaropterix ellenbergeri	Sp. nov	Valid	Mlynský, Wu & Koubová	Late Cretaceous (Cenomanian)	Burmese amber	Myanmar	A cockroach belonging to the family Umenocoleidae or Cratovitismidae.	
Longifuzia	Gen. et sp. nov	Valid	Liang et al.	Middle Jurassic	Jiulongshan Formation	China	A cockroach belonging to the family Fuziidae. Genus includes new species L. pectinata.	
Louispitonia	Nom. nov	Valid	Schubnel & Nel	Middle Paleocene		France	A mantis belonging to the family Chaeteessidae; a replacement name for Archaeophlebia Piton (1940).	
Magniocula	Gen. et sp. nov	Valid	Qiu, Wang & Che	Late Cretaceous (Cenomanian)	Burmese amber	Myanmar	A cockroach belonging to the family Corydiidae. Genus includes new species M. apiculata.	
Malaccina? wightensis	Sp. nov	Valid	Ross	Eocene (Priabonian)	Insect Limestone	United Kingdom	A cockroach belonging to the family Ectobiidae.	
Mastotermes monostichus	Sp. nov	Valid	Zhao et al.	Late Cretaceous (Cenomanian)	Burmese amber	Myanmar	A species of Mastotermes.	
Pabuonqed	Gen. et sp. nov	Valid	Vršanský in Vršanský et al.	Late Cretaceous (Cenomanian)	Burmese amber	Myanmar	A termite related to mastotermitids. Genus includes new species P. eulna.	
Phyllodromica protosardea	Sp. nov	Valid	Ross	Eocene (Priabonian)	Insect Limestone	United Kingdom	A cockroach belonging to the family Ectobiidae.	
Protohierodula	Gen. et sp. nov	Valid	Ross	Eocene (Priabonian)	Insect Limestone	United Kingdom	A mantis of uncertain phylogenetic placement. Originally assigned to the family Mantidae; Schubnel & Nel (2019), classified it as a member of Artimantodea of uncertain phylogenetic placement. Genus includes new species P. crabbi.	
Pseudomantoida	Gen. et sp. nov	Valid	Schubnel & Nel	Early Eocene	Oise amber	France	A mantis belonging to the family Mantoididae. The type species is P. extendidera.	
Spinaeblattina	Gen. et sp. et comb. nov	Valid	Hinkelman	Cretaceous	Burmese amber Yixian Formation	China; Myanmar	A cockroach belonging to the family Mesoblattinidae. Genus includes new species S. myanmarensis, as well as "Piniblattella" yixianensis Gao, Shih & Ren in Gao et al. (2018).	
Spinka	Gen. et sp. nov	Valid	Vršanský, Šmídová & Barna in Vršanský et al.	Late Cretaceous (Cenomanian)	Burmese amber	Myanmar	A cockroach of uncertain phylogenetic placement. Originally described as a member of the family Blattidae; Qiu et al. (2020) transferred it to the family Corydiidae. The type species is S. fussa.	
Stavba	Gen. et sp. nov	Valid	Vršanský et al.	Late Cretaceous (Cenomanian)	Burmese amber	Myanmar	A predatory cockroach. Genus includes new species S. babkaeva.	
Taublatta yaga	Sp. nov	Valid	Aristov in Novikov, Aristov & Sukacheva	Middle Triassic (Anisian)	Nyadeita Formation	Russia	A cockroach belonging to the family Caloblattinidae.	

=== Dipterans ===
Name	Novelty	Status	Authors	Age	Type locality	Country	Notes	Images
Aenigmatias kishenehnensis	Sp. nov	Valid	Brown in Greenwalt et al.	Middle Eocene	Kishenehn Formation	United States	A member of the family Phoridae.	
Agathomyia eocenica	Sp. nov	Valid	Tkoč in Greenwalt et al.	Middle Eocene	Kishenehn Formation	United States	A member of the family Platypezidae.	
Aglaomyia vectis	Sp. nov	Valid	Blagoderov in Krzemiński et al.	Late Eocene	Bembridge Marls	United Kingdom	A species of Aglaomyia.	
Archisargus aequinervus	Sp. nov	Valid	Feng et al.	Middle Jurassic	Daohugou beds	China	A member of Brachycera belonging to the family Archisargidae.	
Azana cockerelli	Sp. nov	Valid	Blagoderov in Krzemiński et al.	Late Eocene	Bembridge Marls	United Kingdom	A member of the family Mycetophilidae.	
Bibiodes kishenehnensis	Sp. nov	Valid	Fitzgerald in Greenwalt et al.	Middle Eocene	Kishenehn Formation	United States	A species of Bibiodes.	
Bibiodes massiliensis	Sp. nov	Valid	Nel, Colomb & Waller in Krzemiński et al.	Late Eocene	Bembridge Marls	United Kingdom	A species of Bibiodes.	
Blera miocenica	Sp. nov	Valid	Hadrava et al.	Miocene (Burdigalian)	Most Basin	Czech Republic	A hoverfly, a species of Blera. Announced in 2019; the final version of the article naming it was published in 2020.	
Bolitophila rohdendorfi	Sp. nov	Valid	Greenwalt & Blagoderov	Eocene	Baltic amber	Europe (Baltic Sea region)	A species of Bolitophila.	
Bolitophila warreni	Sp. nov	Valid	Greenwalt & Blagoderov	Eocene	Kishenehn Formation	United States	A species of Bolitophila.	
Buccinatormyia gangnami	Sp. nov	Valid	Khramov, Nam & Vasilenko	Early Cretaceous	Jinju Formation	South Korea	A member of the family Zhangsolvidae.	
Burmahelea	Gen. et sp. nov	Valid	Szadziewski & Sontag in Szadziewski et al.	Late Cretaceous (Cenomanian)	Burmese amber	Myanmar	A member of Ceratopogonidae belonging to the tribe Atriculicoidini. Genus includes new species B. neli.	
Burmomyia	Gen. et sp. nov	Valid	Zhang et al.	Late Cretaceous (Cenomanian)	Burmese amber	Myanmar	A member of Stratiomyomorpha belonging to the family Zhangsolvidae. Genus includes new species B. rossi.	
Cheilotrichia (Cheilotrichia) duplicata	Sp. nov	Junior homonym	Krzemiński in Krzemiński et al.	Late Eocene	Bembridge Marls	United Kingdom	A species of Cheilotrichia. The name is preoccupied by Cheilotrichia duplicata (Alexander, 1931); a replacement name Cheilotrichia wightensis was subsequently introduced.	
Cheilotrichia (Empeda) pawlowskii	Sp. nov	Valid	Kopeć, Perkovsky & Skibińska	Eocene	Baltic amber Rovno amber	Baltic Sea region Ukraine	A species of Cheilotrichia.	
Cheilotrichia (Empeda) szwedoi	Sp. nov	Valid	Krzemiński in Krzemiński et al.	Late Eocene	Bembridge Marls	United Kingdom	A species of Cheilotrichia.	
Coquillettidia adamowiczi	Sp. nov	Valid	Szadziewski, Sontag & Szwedo	Eocene	Baltic amber	Europe (Baltic Sea region)	A species of Coquillettidia.	
Coquillettidia gedanica	Sp. nov	Valid	Szadziewski, Sontag & Szwedo	Eocene	Baltic amber	Europe (Baltic Sea region)	A species of Coquillettidia.	
Corethrella patula	Sp. nov	Valid	Baranov et al.	Late Cretaceous (Cenomanian)	Burmese amber	Myanmar	A species of Corethrella.	
Cratomyia zhuoi	Sp. nov	Valid	Zhang et al.	Late Cretaceous (Cenomanian)	Burmese amber	Myanmar	A member of Stratiomyomorpha belonging to the family Zhangsolvidae.	
Cretabombylia	Gen. et sp. nov	Valid	Ye et al.	Late Cretaceous (Cenomanian)	Burmese amber	Myanmar	A member of the family Bombyliidae. Genus includes new species C. spinifera.	
Cretarthropeina	Gen. et sp. nov	Valid	Solórzano Kraemer & Cumming	Late Cretaceous (Cenomanian)	Burmese amber	Myanmar	A member of the family Xylomyidae. The type species is C. perdita.	
Cretolbia	Gen. et 3 sp. nov	Valid	Kania et al.	Late Cretaceous (Cenomanian)	Burmese amber	Myanmar	A member of the family Anisopodidae. Genus includes new species C. hukawnga, C. burmitica and C. zhuodei.	
Culicoides bojarskii	Sp. nov	Valid	Szadziewski & Dominiak in Szadziewski et al.	Late Cretaceous (Cenomanian)	Burmese amber	Myanmar	A species of Culicoides.	
Culicoides burmiticus	Sp. nov	Valid	Szadziewski & Dominiak in Szadziewski et al.	Late Cretaceous (Cenomanian)	Burmese amber	Myanmar	A species of Culicoides.	
Culicoides ellenbergeri	Sp. nov	Valid	Szadziewski & Dominiak in Szadziewski et al.	Late Cretaceous (Cenomanian)	Burmese amber	Myanmar	A species of Culicoides.	
Culicoides myanmaricus	Sp. nov	Valid	Szadziewski & Dominiak in Szadziewski et al.	Late Cretaceous (Cenomanian)	Burmese amber	Myanmar	A species of Culicoides.	
Cyttaromyia lynnae	Sp. nov	Valid	De Jong in Greenwalt et al.	Middle Eocene	Kishenehn Formation	United States	A member of the family Cylindrotomidae.	
Cyttaromyia rossi	Sp. nov	Valid	Krzemiński in Krzemiński et al.	Late Eocene	Bembridge Marls	United Kingdom	A member of the family Cylindrotomidae.	
Dicranomyia azari	Sp. nov	Valid	Krzemiński in Krzemiński et al.	Late Eocene	Bembridge Marls	United Kingdom	A species of Dicranomyia.	
Dicranomyia fasciata	Sp. nov	Junior homonym	Krzemiński in Krzemiński et al.	Late Eocene	Bembridge Marls	United Kingdom	A species of Dicranomyia. The name is preoccupied by Dicranomyia fasciata Hutton (1900); a replacement name Dicranomyia britannica was subsequently introduced.	
Dicranoptycha staryi	Sp. nov	Valid	Krzemiński in Krzemiński et al.	Late Eocene	Bembridge Marls	United Kingdom	A species of Dicranoptycha.	
Dilophus andrewrossi	Sp. nov	Valid	Nel, Colomb & Waller in Krzemiński et al.	Late Eocene	Bembridge Marls	United Kingdom	A species of Dilophus.	
Dinobibio	Gen. et sp. nov	Valid	Baranov, Schädel & Haug	Eocene	Baltic amber	Russia (Kaliningrad Oblast)	A member of Bibionomorpha. The type species is D. hoffeinseorum.	
Drapetis adelomedos	Sp. nov	Valid	Greenwalt in Greenwalt et al.	Middle Eocene	Kishenehn Formation	United States	A member of the family Hybotidae.	
Dziedzickia oligocenica	Sp. nov	Valid	Blagoderov in Krzemiński et al.	Late Eocene	Bembridge Marls	United Kingdom	A member of the family Mycetophilidae.	
Efcookella nigra	Sp. nov	Valid	Greenwalt in Greenwalt et al.	Middle Eocene	Kishenehn Formation	United States	A member of the family Scatopsidae.	
Elliprhagio	Gen. et sp. nov	Valid	Han et al.	Middle Jurassic	Jiulongshan Formation	China	A member of the family Rhagionidae. Genus includes new species E. macrosiphonius.	
Ellipteroides (Ellipteroides) kishenehn	Sp. nov	Valid	De Jong in Greenwalt et al.	Middle Eocene	Kishenehn Formation	United States	A species of Ellipteroides.	
Eosciarites	Gen. et sp. nov	Valid	Greenwalt in Greenwalt et al.	Middle Eocene	Kishenehn Formation	United States	A member of the family Sciaridae. The type species is E. hermes.	
Ewaurista	Gen. et sp. nov	Valid	Shcherbakov & Azar	Early Cretaceous	Lebanese amber	Lebanon	A member of the family Trichoceridae. Genus includes new species E. pusilla.	
Gedanoleria	Gen. et sp. nov	Valid	Woźnica	Eocene	Baltic amber	Europe (Baltic Sea region)	A member of the family Heleomyzidae. The type species is G. eocenica.	
Gerontodacus	Gen. et comb. nov		Borkent	Cretaceous	Lebanese amber	Lebanon	A member of the family Ceratopogonidae. The type species is Gerontodacus succineus; also includes G. krzeminskii, G. punctus, & G. skalskii (spanish amber).	
Gurnardia	Gen. et sp. nov	Valid	Krzemiński in Krzemiński et al.	Late Eocene	Bembridge Marls	United Kingdom	A member of the family Limoniidae. Genus includes new species G. corami.	
Helius (Helius) edmundi	Sp. nov	Valid	Krzemiński in Krzemiński et al.	Late Eocene	Bembridge Marls	United Kingdom	A species of Helius.	
Helius (Helius) popovi	Sp. nov	Valid	Krzemiński in Krzemiński et al.	Late Eocene	Bembridge Marls	United Kingdom	A species of Helius.	
Helius (Helius) qinghai	Sp. nov	Valid	Wu & Krzemiński in Wu et al.	Early Miocene	Garang Formation	China	A species of Helius.	
Hirmoneura burmanica	Sp. nov	Valid	Liu & Huang	Late Cretaceous (Cenomanian)	Burmese amber	Myanmar	A member of the family Nemestrinidae.	
Hirmoneura mostovskii	Sp. nov	Valid	Liu & Huang	Late Cretaceous (Cenomanian)	Burmese amber	Myanmar	A member of the family Nemestrinidae.	
Ipsseptemmyia	Gen. et sp. nov	Valid	Fedotova & Perkovsky	Miocene	Dominican amber	Dominican Republic	A member of the family Cecidomyiidae. Genus includes new species I. rossi.	
Kaluginamyia	Gen. et 2 sp. nov	Valid	Lukashevich, Pepinelli & Currie	Early Cretaceous	Gusinoe Ozero Group; Zaza Formation; Gurvan-Eren Formation?	Russia; Mongolia?	A member of Simulioidea belonging to the new family Kaluginamyiidae. The type species is K. enigmatica; genus also includes new species K. baissica and possibly also "Simuliites" brevirostris Kalugina (1986).	
Kishenehnoasilus	Gen. et sp. nov	Valid	Dikow in Greenwalt et al.	Middle Eocene	Kishenehn Formation	United States	A member of the family Asilidae. The type species is K. bhl.	
Kuhwahldyia	Gen. et sp. nov	Valid	Solórzano Kraemer & Cumming	Late Cretaceous (Cenomanian)	Burmese amber	Myanmar	A relative of the family Apsilocephalidae. The type species is K. indefinita.	
Lebania hukawngensis	Sp. nov	Valid	Men, Hu & Mu	Late Cretaceous (Cenomanian)	Burmese amber	Myanmar	A member of Limoniidae.	
Lebania pilosa	Sp. nov	Valid	Men, Hu & Mu	Late Cretaceous (Cenomanian)	Burmese amber	Myanmar	A member of Limoniidae.	
Lebania podenasi	Sp. nov	Valid	Men, Hu & Mu	Late Cretaceous (Cenomanian)	Burmese amber	Myanmar	A member of Limoniidae.	
Leia gurnardensis	Sp. nov	Valid	Blagoderov in Krzemiński et al.	Late Eocene	Bembridge Marls	United Kingdom	A species of Leia.	
Leptotarsus fragmentatus	Sp. nov	Valid	Krzemiński in Krzemiński et al.	Late Eocene	Bembridge Marls	United Kingdom	A species of Leptotarsus.	
Leptotarsus wegiereki	Sp. nov	Valid	Krzemiński in Krzemiński et al.	Late Eocene	Bembridge Marls	United Kingdom	A species of Leptotarsus.	
Libanochlites eocenicus	Sp. nov	Valid	Baranov et al.	Eocene (Ypresian to Priabonian)	Baltic amber	Russia (Kaliningrad Oblast)	A member of the family Chironomidae.	
Libanodiamesa simpsoni	Sp. nov	Valid	Baranov et al.	Early Cretaceous (Barremian)		United Kingdom	A member of the family Chironomidae.	
Litoleptis araeostylus	Sp. nov	Valid	Greenwalt in Greenwalt et al.	Middle Eocene	Kishenehn Formation	United States	A species of Litoleptis.	
Lonchoptera eocenica	Sp. nov	Valid	Amorim & Brown in Greenwalt et al.	Middle Eocene	Kishenehn Formation	United States	A species of Lonchoptera.	
Mangas brevisubcosta	Sp. nov	Valid	Greenwalt & Blagoderov	Early Cretaceous	Gusinoe Ozero Group	Russia	A member of the family Bolitophilidae.	
Mangas kovalevi	Sp. nov	Valid	Greenwalt & Blagoderov	Early Cretaceous	Gusinoe Ozero Group	Russia	A member of the family Bolitophilidae.	
Mexicanodiplosis	Gen. et sp. nov	Valid	Fedotova & Perkovsky	Miocene	Mexican amber	Mexico	A member of the family Cecidomyiidae. Genus includes new species M. katyae.	
Mesochria deploegi	Sp. nov	Valid	Camier & Nel	Early Eocene	Oise amber	France	A member of Anisopodidae.	
Mesorhyphus blagoderovi	Sp. nov	Valid	Wojtoń et al.	Jurassic	Daohugou Beds	China	A member of the family Anisopodidae.	
Micrepimera neli	Sp. nov	Valid	Blagoderov & Skibińska in Blagoderov, Krzemiński & Skibińska	Eocene	Baltic amber	Europe (Baltic Sea region)	A member of the family Keroplatidae belonging to the subfamily Macrocerinae and the tribe Robsonomyiini.	
Myanmaro	Gen. et sp. nov	Valid	Giłka et al.	Late Cretaceous (Cenomanian)	Burmese amber	Myanmar	An orthoclad. Genus includes new species M. primus.	
Mycetobia christelae	Sp. nov	Valid	Wojtoń, Kania & Krzemiński	Eocene	Baltic amber	Europe (Baltic Sea region)	A species of Mycetobia.	
Mycetobia hansi	Sp. nov	Valid	Wojtoń, Kania & Krzemiński	Eocene	Baltic amber	Europe (Baltic Sea region)	A species of Mycetobia.	
Mycetobia myanmara	Sp. nov	Valid	Kania, Wojtoń & Krzemiński	Late Cretaceous (Cenomanian)	Burmese amber	Myanmar	A species of Mycetobia.	
Mycetobia perkovskyi	Sp. nov	Valid	Wojtoń, Kania & Krzemiński	Eocene	Rovno amber	Ukraine	A species of Mycetobia.	
Mycetobia silvia	Sp. nov	Valid	Wojtoń, Kania & Krzemiński	Eocene	Baltic amber	Europe (Baltic Sea region)	A species of Mycetobia.	
Mycetobia sylvieae	Sp. nov	Valid	Camier & Nel	Early Eocene	Oise amber	France	A species of Mycetobia.	
Mycetobia szwedoi	Sp. nov	Valid	Wojtoń, Kania & Krzemiński	Eocene	Baltic amber	Europe (Baltic Sea region)	A species of Mycetobia.	
Mycomya hoolei	Sp. nov	Valid	Blagoderov in Krzemiński et al.	Late Eocene	Bembridge Marls	United Kingdom	A species of Mycomya.	
Nelohelea	Gen. et sp. nov	Valid	Szadziewski & Sontag in Szadziewski et al.	Late Cretaceous (Cenomanian)	Burmese amber	Myanmar	A member of Ceratopogonidae belonging to the tribe Ceratopogonini. Genus includes new species N. neli.	
Orimarga lenae	Sp. nov	Valid	Krzemiński in Krzemiński et al.	Late Eocene	Bembridge Marls	United Kingdom	A species of Orimarga.	
Palaeoberidops	Gen. et sp. nov	Valid	Nicholson in Krzemiński et al.	Late Eocene	Bembridge Marls	United Kingdom	A member of the family Stratiomyidae. Genus includes new species P. barkeri.	
Palaeoempalia saxea	Sp. nov	Valid	Blagoderov in Krzemiński et al.	Late Eocene	Bembridge Marls	United Kingdom	A member of the family Mycetophilidae.	
Palaeoglaesum carsteni	Sp. nov	Valid	Skibińska, Krzemiński & Zhang	Late Cretaceous (Cenomanian)	Burmese amber	Myanmar	A member of the family Psychodidae belonging to the subfamily Bruchomyiinae.	
Palaeoglaesum wagneri	Sp. nov	Valid	Skibińska, Krzemiński & Zhang	Late Cretaceous (Cenomanian)	Burmese amber	Myanmar	A member of the family Psychodidae belonging to the subfamily Bruchomyiinae.	
Pankowskia	Gen. et sp. nov	Valid	Solórzano Kraemer & Cumming	Late Cretaceous (Cenomanian)	Burmese amber	Myanmar	A member of the family Xylomyidae. The type species is P. primera.	
Peculibombylia	Gen. et sp. nov	Valid	Ye et al.	Late Cretaceous (Cenomanian)	Burmese amber	Myanmar	A member of the family Bombyliidae. Genus includes new species P. relictivena.	
Pilaria hooleyi	Sp. nov	Valid	Krzemiński in Krzemiński et al.	Late Eocene	Bembridge Marls	United Kingdom	A species of Pilaria.	
Pilaria volodii	Sp. nov	Valid	Krzemiński in Krzemiński et al.	Late Eocene	Bembridge Marls	United Kingdom	A species of Pilaria.	
Priscoculex	Gen. et sp. nov	Valid	Poinar, Zavortink & Brown	Late Cretaceous (Cenomanian)	Burmese amber	Myanmar	A mosquito. Genus includes new species P. burmanicus.	
Pristinmicrophor	Gen. et sp. nov	Valid	Tang et al.	Late Cretaceous (Cenomanian)	Burmese amber	Myanmar	A member of the family Dolichopodidae belonging to the subfamily Microphorinae. Genus includes new species P. hukawngensis.	
Protoculicoides revelatus	Sp. nov	Valid	Borkent	Late Cretaceous (Cenomanian	Burmese amber	Myanmar	A member of the family Ceratopogonidae.	
Protohoraiella	Gen. et 2 sp. nov	Valid	Curler, Krzemiński & Skibińska	Late Cretaceous (Cenomanian)	Burmese amber	Myanmar	A drain fly belonging to the subfamily Horaiellinae. Genus includes new species P. katerinae and P. yvonnae.	
Protonemestrius magnus	Sp. nov	Valid	Liu & Huang	Early Cretaceous (late Barremian–early Aptian)	Yixian Formation	China	A member of the family Nemestrinidae.	
Protorhyphus jurassicus	Sp. nov	Valid	Wojtoń et al.	Jurassic	Daohugou Beds	China	A member of Anisopodoidea belonging to the family Protorhyphidae.	
Protorhyphus lukashevichae	Sp. nov	Valid	Wojtoń et al.	Jurassic	Daohugou Beds	China	A member of Anisopodoidea belonging to the family Protorhyphidae.	
Regmoclemina haennii	Sp. nov	Valid	Krzemiński in Krzemiński et al.	Late Eocene	Bembridge Marls	United Kingdom	A member of the family Scatopsidae.	
Reissa kohlsi	Sp. nov	Valid	Evenhuis	Eocene	Green River Formation	United States	A member of the family Mythicomyiidae.	
Rymosia hypnolithica	Sp. nov	Valid	Kerr in Greenwalt et al.	Middle Eocene	Kishenehn Formation	United States	A member of the family Mycetophilidae.	
Salishomyia	Gen. et sp. nov	Valid	Bickel in Greenwalt et al.	Middle Eocene	Kishenehn Formation	United States	A member of the family Dolichopodidae belonging to the subfamily Medeterinae. The type species is S. eocenica.	
Schistostoma burmanicum	Sp. nov	Valid	Brooks, Cumming & Grimaldi	Late Cretaceous (Cenomanian)	Burmese amber	Myanmar	A member of Microphorinae.	
Schistostoma foliatum	Sp. nov	Valid	Brooks, Cumming & Grimaldi	Late Cretaceous (Cenomanian)	Burmese amber	Myanmar	A member of Microphorinae.	
Sciara jucheti	Sp. nov	Valid	Camier & Nel	Early Eocene	Oise amber	France	A member of the family Sciaridae. Originally described as a species of Sciara, but subsequently transferred to the genus Leptosciarella.	
Similipioneeria	Gen. et sp. nov	Valid	Ye et al.	Late Cretaceous (Cenomanian)	Burmese amber	Myanmar	A member of the family Bombyliidae. Genus includes new species S. mirantenna.	
Sylvicola harrisi	Nom. nov	Valid	Hancock & Kania	Eocene	Baltic amber	Baltic Sea region	A species of Sylvicola; a replacement name for Sylvicola punctata Wojtoń, Kania & Kopeć (2018).	
Sylvicola problematica	Sp. nov	Valid	Krzemiński in Krzemiński et al.	Late Eocene	Bembridge Marls	United Kingdom	A species of Sylvicola.	
Sylvicola silibrarius	Sp. nov	Valid	Greenwalt in Greenwalt et al.	Middle Eocene	Kishenehn Formation	United States	A species of Sylvicola.	
Symplecta gurnetensis	Sp. nov	Valid	Krzemiński in Krzemiński et al.	Late Eocene	Bembridge Marls	United Kingdom	A species of Symplecta.	
Tipula anglicana	Sp. nov	Valid	Krzemiński in Krzemiński et al.	Late Eocene	Bembridge Marls	United Kingdom	A species of Tipula sensu lato.	
Tipula (Trichotipula) fji	Sp. nov	Valid	De Jong in Greenwalt et al.	Middle Eocene	Kishenehn Formation	United States	A species of Tipula.	
Trentepohlia (Mongoma) pouilloni	Sp. nov	Valid	Ngô-Muller, Garrouste & Nel in Ngô-Muller et al.	Miocene	Sumatra amber	Indonesia	A species of Trentepohlia.	
Wightipsychoda	Gen. nov	Valid	Azar in Krzemiński et al.	Late Eocene	Bembridge Marls	United Kingdom	A member of the family Psychodidae.	
Yantaromyia	Gen. et sp. nov	Valid	Barták	Eocene	Baltic amber	Europe (Baltic Sea region)	A member of Schizophora belonging to the new family Yantaromyiidae. Genus includes new species Y. arcana.	
Zhenia burmensis	Sp. nov	Valid	Zhang & Zhang	Late Cretaceous (Cenomanian)	Burmese amber	Myanmar	A member of Brachycera belonging to the group Archisargoidea and to the family Eremochaetidae.	
Zhiganka longialata	Sp. nov	Valid	Lukashevich	Early Cretaceous	Gusinoe Ozero Group	Russia	A member of the family Ptychopteridae.	

=== Hemipterans ===
Name	Novelty	Status	Authors	Age	Type locality	Country	Notes	Images
Ambitaktoa	Gen. et sp. nov	Valid	Szwedo in Szwedo et al.	Late Eocene		United Kingdom	A member of Nogodinidae. Genus includes new species A. stoumma.	
Ankomwarius	Gen. et sp. nov	Valid	Szwedo in Szwedo et al.	Late Eocene		United Kingdom	A member of Lophopidae. Genus includes new species A. brodiei.	
Ankwlanno	Gen. et sp. nov	Valid	Szwedo in Szwedo et al.	Late Eocene		United Kingdom	A member of Ricaniidae. Genus includes new species A. bluga.	
Archeaneurus	Gen. et sp. nov	Valid	Heiss	Late Cretaceous (Cenomanian)	Burmese amber	Myanmar	A member of the family Aradidae. Genus includes new species A. neli.	
Archecalisius	Gen. et sp. nov	Valid	Heiss	Late Cretaceous (Cenomanian)	Burmese amber	Myanmar	A member of Aradidae belonging to the subfamily Calisiinae. The type species is A. longiventris.	
Berro	Gen. et sp. nov	Valid	Szwedo in Szwedo et al.	Late Eocene		United Kingdom	A member of Cercopidae. Genus includes new species B. enissuextaensis.	
Betulaphis kozlovi	Sp. nov	Valid	Węgierek in Szwedo et al.	Late Eocene		United Kingdom	A member of Drepanosiphidae.	
Blenniphora	Gen. et comb. et 2 sp. nov	Valid	Szwedo in Szwedo et al.	Late Eocene		United Kingdom	A member of Aphrophoridae. Genus includes B. woodwardi (Cockerell), as well as new species B. skaka and B. bikkanoa.	
Breukoscelis	Gen. et 2 sp. nov	Disputed	Szwedo in Szwedo et al.	Late Eocene		United Kingdom	Originally described as member of Issidae; Gnezdilov & Emeljanov (2020) transferred it to the family Cixiidae and considered it to be a junior synonym of the genus Uphodato. Genus includes new species B. vadimgratshevi and B. phrikkosus.	
Burmocercopis	Gen. et sp. nov	Valid	Fu, Cai & Huang	Late Cretaceous (Cenomanian)	Burmese amber	Myanmar	A froghopper belonging to the family Procercopidae. Genus includes new species B. lingpogensis.	
Cacopsylla trigona	Sp. nov	Valid	Zhang et al.	Miocene		China	A species of Cacopsylla.	
Catulliastites	Nom. nov	Valid	Szwedo in Szwedo et al.	Late Eocene		United Kingdom	A member of Cixiidae; a replacement name for Hastites Cockerell (1922).	
Cicadomorpha guancaishanensis	Sp. nov	Valid	Fu, Cai & Huang	Late Jurassic	Tiaojishan Formation	China	A member of the family Palaeontinidae.	
Colopha? incognita	Sp. nov	Valid	Węgierek in Szwedo et al.	Late Eocene		United Kingdom	A member of Eriosomatidae.	
Cretacoelidia	Gen. et sp. nov	Valid	Wang, Dietrich & Zhang	Late Cretaceous (Cenomanian)	Burmese amber	Myanmar	A leafhopper belonging to the subfamily Coelidiinae. Genus includes new species C. viraktamathi.	
Cretosinoala	Gen. et sp. nov	Valid	Fu & Huang	Late Cretaceous (Cenomanian)	Burmese amber	Myanmar	A froghopper belonging to the subfamily Sinoalidae. Genus includes new species C. tetraspina.	
Cretotettigarcta	Gen. et sp. nov	Valid	Fu, Cai & Huang	Late Cretaceous (Cenomanian)	Burmese amber	Myanmar	Originally described as a hairy cicada, but subsequently reinterpreted as a stem cicadid. Genus includes new species C. burmensis.	
Dachibangus formosus	Sp. nov	Valid	Fu et al.	Late Cretaceous (Cenomanian)	Burmese amber	Myanmar	A planthopper belonging to the family Mimarachnidae. Originally described as a species of Dachibangus, but subsequently transferred to the genus Xiaochibangus.	
Dakrutulia	Gen. et sp. nov	Valid	Szwedo in Szwedo et al.	Late Eocene		United Kingdom	A member of Tropiduchidae. Genus includes new species D. mikhailkozlovi.	
Delwa	Gen. et sp. nov	Valid	Szwedo in Szwedo et al.	Late Eocene		United Kingdom	A member of Cixiidae. Genus includes new species D. morikwa.	
Diacorixites	Gen. et sp. nov	Valid	Popov in Szwedo et al.	Late Eocene		United Kingdom	A member of Corixidae. Genus includes new species D. szwedoi.	
Dweivera	Gen. et sp. nov	Valid	Szwedo in Szwedo et al.	Late Eocene		United Kingdom	A member of Cixiidae. Genus includes new species D. reikea.	
Echinoaphis	Gen. et sp. nov	Valid	Węgierek, Cai & Huang	Late Cretaceous (Cenomanian)	Burmese amber	Myanmar	A member of Aphidomorpha belonging to the family Burmitaphididae. Genus includes new species E. penalverii.	
Eoblissus	Gen. et sp. nov	Valid	Garrouste, Schubnel & Nel	Early Eocene	Oise amber	France	A member of the family Blissidae. Genus includes new species E. gallicus.	
Eocenocydnus	Gen. et sp. nov	Valid	Popov in Szwedo et al.	Late Eocene		United Kingdom	A member of Cydnidae. Genus includes new species E. lisi.	
Eochauliops	Gen. et sp. nov	Valid	Camier et al.	Early Eocene	Oise amber	France	A member of the family Malcidae. Genus includes new species E. longicornis.	
Eogyropsylla pankowskii	Sp. nov	Valid	Ashe-Jepson & Ouvrard in Ashe-Jepson, Garbout & Ouvrard	Eocene	Baltic amber	Europe (Baltic Sea region)	A member of Aphalarinae.	
Eriosoma gratshevi	Sp. nov	Valid	Węgierek in Szwedo et al.	Late Eocene		United Kingdom	A member of Eriosomatidae.	
Furtivirete	Gen. et sp. nov	Valid	Zhang, Ren & Yao	Late Cretaceous (Cenomanian)	Burmese amber	Myanmar	A planthopper belonging to the new family Jubisentidae. Genus includes new species F. zhuoi.	
Gakasha	Gen. et sp. nov	Valid	Jiang, Wang & Szwedo	Late Cretaceous (Cenomanian)	Burmese amber	Myanmar	A moss bug belonging to the family Progonocimicidae. Genus includes new species G. calcaridentata.	
Gurnardinia	Gen. et sp. nov	Valid	Popov in Szwedo et al.	Late Eocene		United Kingdom	A member of Miridae. Genus includes new species G. herczeki.	
Gurnardobaya	Gen. et sp. nov	Valid	Popov in Szwedo et al.	Late Eocene		United Kingdom	A member of Lygaeidae. Genus includes new species G. rossi.	
Hormaphis? longistigma	Sp. nov	Valid	Węgierek in Szwedo et al.	Late Eocene		United Kingdom	A member of Hormaphididae.	
Hpanraais	Gen. et sp. nov	Junior synonym	Jiang et al.	Late Cretaceous (Cenomanian)	Burmese amber	Myanmar	Originally described as a hairy cicada, but subsequently reinterpreted as a stem cicadid. Genus includes new species H. problematicus. Jiang et al. (2024) reinterpreted Hpanraais as a junior synonym of the genus Cretotettigarcta, though the authors maintained H. problematicus as a distinct species within the latter genus.	
Ilerdocossus dissidens	Sp. nov	Valid	Li, Chen & Wang	Early Cretaceous	Yixian Formation	China	A member of the family Palaeontinidae.	
Ilerdocossus prowsei	Sp. nov	Valid	Li et al.	Early Cretaceous		United Kingdom	A member of the family Palaeontinidae.	
Jiaotouia	Gen. et sp. nov	Valid	Chen & Wang in Chen et al.	Late Cretaceous (Cenomanian)	Burmese amber	Myanmar	A froghopper belonging to the family Sinoalidae. Genus includes new species J. minuta.	
Jubisentis	Gen. et sp. nov	Valid	Zhang, Ren & Yao	Late Cretaceous (Cenomanian)	Burmese amber	Myanmar	A planthopper belonging to the new family Jubisentidae. Genus includes new species J. hui.	
Juroala	Gen. et sp. nov	Valid	Chen & Wang in Chen et al.	Middle–Late Jurassic	Daohugou Beds	China	A froghopper belonging to the family Sinoalidae. Genus includes new species J. daohugouensis.	
Kachinia	Gen. et sp. nov	Junior homonym	Chen et al.	Late Cretaceous (Cenomanian)	Burmese amber	Myanmar	A member of Dipsocoromorpha belonging to the family Schizopteridae. Genus includes new species K. cretacea. The generic name is preoccupied by Kachinia Tong & Li (2018).	
Keirophettus	Gen. et sp. nov	Valid	Szwedo in Szwedo et al.	Late Eocene		United Kingdom	A member of Tropiduchidae. Genus includes new species K. atibenus.	
Kernastiridius	Gen. et sp. nov	Valid	Szwedo in Szwedo et al.	Late Eocene		United Kingdom	A member of Cixiidae. Genus includes new species K. nephlajeus.	
Kintusamo	Gen. et sp. nov	Valid	Szwedo in Szwedo et al.	Late Eocene		United Kingdom	A member of Cicadidae. Genus includes new species K. boulardi.	
Klugga	Gen. et 2 sp. nov	Valid	Szwedo in Szwedo et al.	Late Eocene		United Kingdom	A member of Cixiidae. Genus includes new species K. gnawa and K. regoa.	
Kommanosyne	Gen. et sp. nov	Valid	Szwedo in Szwedo et al.	Late Eocene		United Kingdom	A member of Cixiidae. Genus includes new species K. wrikkua.	
Komnixta	Gen. et sp. nov	Valid	Szwedo in Szwedo et al.	Late Eocene		United Kingdom	A member of Cixiidae. Genus includes new species K. jarzembowskii.	
Komsitija	Gen. et sp. nov	Valid	Szwedo in Szwedo et al.	Late Eocene		United Kingdom	A member of Cixiidae. Genus includes new species K. tuberculata.	
Krundia	Gen. et sp. nov	Valid	Szwedo in Szwedo et al.	Late Eocene		United Kingdom	Originally described as a member of Issidae; Gnezdilov & Emeljanov (2020) transferred it to the family Tropiduchidae. Genus includes new species K. korba.	
Kzylcader	Gen. et comb. et 4 sp. nov	Valid	Popov & Golub	Late Cretaceous		Kazakhstan	A lace bug. The type species is "Sinaldocader" rasnitsyni Golub & Popov (2012); genus also includes new species K. ovatus, K. angustatus, K. shcherbakovi and K. strigosus.	
Langsmaniko	Gen. et sp. nov	Valid	Szwedo in Szwedo et al.	Late Eocene		United Kingdom	A member of Cixiidae. Genus includes new species L. marous.	
Linglunxiellus	Gen. et sp. nov	Valid	Szwedo & Huang	Middle Permian		China	A member of Cicadomorpha belonging to the family Dysmorphoptilidae. Genus includes new species L. chaohuensis.	
Liwakka	Gen. et sp. nov	Valid	Szwedo in Szwedo et al.	Late Eocene		United Kingdom	A member of Cixiidae. Genus includes new species L. gelloa.	
Luanpingia youchongi	Sp. nov	Valid	Fu & Huang	Middle–Late Jurassic	Daohugou Beds	China	A member of the family Sinoalidae.	
Luisphantyelus	Gen. et sp. nov	Valid	Szwedo in Szwedo et al.	Late Eocene		United Kingdom	A member of Aphrophoridae. Genus includes new species L. briwus.	
Margaxius	Gen. et sp. nov	Valid	Szwedo in Szwedo et al.	Late Eocene		United Kingdom	A member of Cixiidae. Genus includes new species M. angosus.	
Mesodorus	Gen. et sp. nov	Junior homonym	Chen & Wang in Chen et al.	Late Cretaceous (Cenomanian)	Burmese amber	Myanmar	A member of Cicadomorpha belonging to the family Sinoalidae. Genus includes new species M. orientalis. The generic name is preoccupied by Mesodorus Cobb (1920); Chen et al. (2020) coined a replacement name Cretadorus.	
Mesolongicapitis	Gen. et sp. nov	Valid	Chen et al.	Late Cretaceous (Cenomanian)	Burmese amber	Myanmar	A member of Cicadomorpha belonging to the family Sinoalidae. Genus includes new species M. peii.	
Mimaplax	Gen. et sp. nov	Valid	Jiang, Szwedo & Wang	Late Cretaceous (Cenomanian)	Burmese amber	Myanmar	A planthopper belonging to the family Mimarachnidae. The type species is M. ekrypsan.	Mimaplax ekrypsan
Minlagerron	Gen. et 2 sp. nov	Valid	Chen, Szwedo & Wang in Chen et al.	Late Cretaceous (Cenomanian)	Burmese amber	Myanmar	A member of Cicadomorpha belonging to the new family Minlagerrontidae. Genus includes new species M. griphos and M. onyxos.	
Miracossus gongi	Sp. nov	Valid	Li, Chen & Wang	Early Cretaceous	Yixian Formation	China	A member of the family Palaeontinidae.	
Natajephora	Gen. et sp. nov	Valid	Szwedo in Szwedo et al.	Late Eocene		United Kingdom	A member of Aphrophoridae. Genus includes new species N. lijanka.	
Niadrima	Gen. et sp. nov	Valid	Szwedo in Szwedo et al.	Late Eocene		United Kingdom	A member of Nogodinidae. Genus includes new species N. yulei.	
Ornatiala	Gen. et sp. nov	Valid	Chen, Wang & Zhang in Chen et al.	Late Cretaceous (Cenomanian)	Burmese amber	Myanmar	A froghopper belonging to the family Sinoalidae. Genus includes new species O. amoena.	
Paleotriatoma	Gen. et sp. nov	Valid	Poinar	Late Cretaceous (Cenomanian)	Burmese amber	Myanmar	A member of the family Reduviidae. Genus includes new species P. metaxytaxa.	Paleotriatoma metaxytaxa
Panfossilis	Gen. et sp. nov	Valid	Węgierek in Szwedo et al.	Late Eocene		United Kingdom	A member of Drepanosiphidae. Genus includes new species P. anglicus.	
Paranthoscytina	Gen. et sp. nov	Valid	Fu, Cai & Huang	Late Cretaceous (Cenomanian)	Burmese amber	Myanmar	A froghopper belonging to the family Procercopidae. Genus includes new species P. xiai.	
Paraornatiala	Gen. et sp. nov	Valid	Fu & Huang	Late Cretaceous (Cenomanian)	Burmese amber	Myanmar	A froghopper belonging to the subfamily Sinoalidae. Genus includes new species P. daidaleos.	
Paraphatnomacader	Gen. et sp. nov	Valid	Guilbert & Heiss	Late Cretaceous (Cenomanian)	Burmese amber	Myanmar	A member of the family Tingidae. Genus includes new species P. huarongcheni.	
Parasinalda wappleri	Sp. nov	Valid	Popov in Szwedo et al.	Late Eocene		United Kingdom	A member of Tingidae.	
Parasinoala	Gen. et 3 sp. nov	Junior synonym	Fu & Huang	Middle or Late Jurassic	Haifanggou Formation	China	A member of the family Sinoalidae. Genus includes new species P. daohugouensis, P. minuta and P. magnus. Fu & Huang (2019) subsequently considered Parasinoala to be a junior synonym of the genus Juroala; the authors coined a replacement name Juroala daidaleos for the species Parasinoala daohugouensis.	
Parwaina	Gen. et sp. nov	Valid	Song, Szwedo & Bourgoin in Song et al.	Late Cretaceous (Cenomanian)	Burmese amber	Myanmar	A planthopper belonging to the new family Yetkhatidae. Genus includes new species P. liuyei.	
Phariberea	Gen. et sp. nov	Valid	Szwedo in Szwedo et al.	Late Eocene		United Kingdom	A member of Nogodinidae. Genus includes new species P. gurdonika.	
Phatanako	Gen. et comb. nov	Valid	Szwedo in Szwedo et al.	Late Eocene		United Kingdom	A member of Tropiduchidae. Genus includes P. wilmattae (Cockerell).	
Podopinites	Gen. et sp. et comb. nov	Valid	Popov in Szwedo et al.	Late Eocene		United Kingdom	A member of Pentatomidae. Genus includes new species P. coloratus, as well as P. acourti (Cockerell).	
Postopsyllidium burmaticum	Sp. nov	Valid	Hakim et al.	Late Cretaceous (Cenomanian)	Burmese amber	Myanmar	A member of Protopsyllidioidea.	
Postopsyllidium grimaldii	Sp. nov	Valid	Hakim et al.	Late Cretaceous (Cenomanian)	Burmese amber	Myanmar	A member of Protopsyllidioidea.	
Punctacorona	Gen. et sp. nov	Valid	Wang et al.	Late Cretaceous (Cenomanian)	Burmese amber	Myanmar	A member of the family Cydnidae. Genus includes new species P. triplosticha.	
Qilia	Gen. et sp. nov	Valid	Chen et al.	Late Cretaceous (Cenomanian)	Burmese amber	Myanmar	A leafhopper belonging to the subfamily Ledrinae. Genus includes new species Q. regilla.	
Reteotissus	Gen. et sp. nov	Valid	Szwedo in Szwedo et al.	Late Eocene		United Kingdom	A member of Tropiduchidae. Genus includes new species R. hooleyi.	
Reticulatitergum	Gen. et sp. nov	Valid	Du et al.	Late Cretaceous (Cenomanian)	Burmese amber	Myanmar	A member of Coreoidea belonging to the family Yuripopovinidae. Genus includes new species R. hui.	
Sakhalotettix	Gen. et sp. nov	Valid	Dietrich & Perkovsky	Middle Eocene	Sakhalinian amber	Russia	A leafhopper. The type species is S. eocenicus.	
Samaliverus	Gen. et sp. nov	Valid	Szwedo in Szwedo et al.	Late Eocene		United Kingdom	A member of Cixiidae. Genus includes new species S. bikkanus.	
Seeteascanopia	Gen. et sp. nov	Valid	Bourgoin & Wang in Bourgoin et al.	Early Miocene	Dominican amber	Dominican Republic	A member of the family Tropiduchidae belonging to the subfamily Tropiduchinae and the tribe Paricanini. The type species is S. arcabucana.	
Senogaetulia	Gen. et sp. nov	Valid	Szwedo in Szwedo et al.	Late Eocene		United Kingdom	A member of Tropiduchidae. Genus includes new species S. kwalea.	
Sinicoselis	Gen. et sp. nov	Valid	Drohojowska et al.	Middle-Late Jurassic	Daohugou Beds	China	A relative of whiteflies. Genus includes new species S. weberi.	
Sognotela	Gen. et sp. nov	Valid	Szwedo in Szwedo et al.	Late Eocene		United Kingdom	A member of Tropiduchidae. Genus includes new species S. emeljanovi.	
Stellularis bineuris	Sp. nov	Valid	Chen & Wang in Chen et al.	Early Cretaceous	Yixian Formation	China	A froghopper belonging to the family Procercopidae. Announced in 2019; the final version of the article naming it was published in 2020.	
Stellularis minutus	Sp. nov	Valid	Chen & Wang in Chen et al.	Early Cretaceous	Yixian Formation	China	A froghopper belonging to the family Procercopidae. Announced in 2019; the final version of the article naming it was published in 2020.	
Talbragarocossus	Gen. et sp. nov	Valid	Chen, Beattie & Wang in Chen et al.	Late Jurassic	Talbragar fossil site	Australia	A member of the family Palaeontinidae. Genus includes new species T. jurassicus.	
Tardilly	Gen. et comb. nov	Valid	Lambkin	Late Triassic		Australia	A new genus for "Mesodiphthera" prosboloides Tillyard (1922) and "Mesodiphthera" dunstani Tillyard (1922).	
Teniwitta	Gen. et sp. nov	Valid	Szwedo in Szwedo et al.	Late Eocene		United Kingdom	A leafhopper. Genus includes new species T. andrewrossi.	
Tingiphatnoma	Gen. et 3 sp. nov	Valid	Guilbert & Heiss	Late Cretaceous (Cenomanian)	Burmese amber	Myanmar	A member of the family Tingidae. Genus includes new species T. bispinosa, T. suchorskii and T. andreneli.	
Uphodato	Gen. et sp. nov	Valid	Szwedo in Szwedo et al.	Late Eocene		United Kingdom	Originally described as a member of Issidae; Gnezdilov & Emeljanov (2020) transferred it to the family Cixiidae. Genus includes new species U. garwoterus.	
Valdicossus mikewebsteri	Sp. nov	Valid	Li et al.	Early Cretaceous		United Kingdom	A member of the family Palaeontinidae.	
Vasteantenatus	Gen. et 2 sp. nov	Valid	Węgierek, Cai & Huang	Late Cretaceous (Cenomanian)	Burmese amber	Myanmar	A member of Aphidomorpha belonging to the family Burmitaphididae. Genus includes new species V. hukawngi Węgierek, Cai & Huang (2019) and V. reliquialaus Liu et al. (2019).	
Vetuprosbole	Gen. et sp. nov	Valid	Fu, Cai & Huang	Late Cretaceous (Cenomanian)	Burmese amber	Myanmar	A hairy cicada. Genus includes new species V. parallelica.	
Vietocycla katyae	Sp. nov	Valid	Fu & Huang	Early Cretaceous	Lushangfen Formation	China	A member of Cicadomorpha belonging to the family Hylicellidae.	
Viktorgolubia	Gen. et comb. nov	Valid	Popov in Szwedo et al.	Late Eocene		United Kingdom	A member of Tingidae. Genus includes V. seposita (Cockerell).	
Wixskimoa	Gen. et sp. nov	Valid	Szwedo in Szwedo et al.	Late Eocene		United Kingdom	A member of Nogodinidae. Genus includes new species W. torxsea.	
Worodbera	Gen. et sp. nov	Valid	Szwedo in Szwedo et al.	Late Eocene		United Kingdom	A member of Cixiidae. Genus includes new species W. nimakka.	
Yetkhata	Gen. et sp. nov	Valid	Song, Szwedo & Bourgoin in Song et al.	Late Cretaceous (Cenomanian)	Burmese amber	Myanmar	A planthopper belonging to the new family Yetkhatidae. Genus includes new species Y. jiangershii.	

=== Hymenopterans ===
Name	Novelty	Status	Authors	Age	Type locality	Country	Notes	Images
Allobethylus bei	Sp. nov	Valid	Colombo & Azevedo	Eocene	Baltic amber	Europe (Baltic Sea region)	A member of the family Bethylidae belonging to the subfamily Scleroderminae.	
Amplicella abbreviata	Sp. nov	Valid	Li, Shih, Kopylov & Ren in Li et al.	Early Cretaceous	Yixian Formation	China	A member of the family Ichneumonidae belonging to the subfamily Tanychorinae.	
Angarosphex baektoensus	Sp. nov	Valid	Jon et al.	Cretaceous	Sinuiju Formation	North Korea	A member of Apoidea belonging to the family Angarosphecidae.	
Archaeonoxus	Gen. et sp. nov	Valid	Colombo & Azevedo	Eocene	Baltic amber	Europe (Baltic Sea region)	A member of the family Bethylidae belonging to the subfamily Scleroderminae. Genus includes new species A. scintillatus.	
Archeofoenus engeli	Sp. nov	Valid	Turrisi & Ellenberger	Late Cretaceous (Cenomanian)	Burmese amber	Myanmar	A member of the family Aulacidae.	
Aureobythus	Gen. et 3 sp. nov	Valid	Melo & Lucena	Late Cretaceous (Cenomanian)	Burmese amber	Myanmar	A member of Chrysidoidea belonging to the new family Chrysobythidae. Genus includes new species A. decoloratus, A. punctatus and A. villosus.	
Baeomorpha liorum	Sp. nov	Valid	Huber, Shih & Ren	Late Cretaceous (Cenomanian)	Burmese amber	Myanmar	A member of the family Rotoitidae.	Baeomorpha liorum
Bethylochrysis	Gen. et sp. nov	Valid	Melo & Lucena	Late Cretaceous (Cenomanian)	Burmese amber	Myanmar	A member of Chrysidoidea belonging to the new family Chrysobythidae. Genus includes new species B. clypeata.	
Bocchus primaevus	Sp. nov	Valid	Martins & Melo	Eocene	Baltic amber	Europe (Baltic Sea region)	A member of the family Dryinidae belonging to the subfamily Bocchinae.	
Bombus beskonakensis	Comb nov	Valid	(Nel & Petrulevicius)	Aquitanian	Bes-Konak	Turkey	A mendacibombine bumblebee, Moved from Oligoapis beskonakensis (2003)	Bombus beskonakensis
Bombus patriciae	Comb nov	valid	(Nel & Petrulevicius)	Aquitanian	Bes-Konak	Turkey	First described as an Electrobombini bee Moved from (2003)	Bombus patriciae
Brachyelatus marthae	Sp. nov	Valid	Burks, Krogmann & Heraty	Eocene	Baltic amber	Europe (Baltic Sea region)	A member of the family Perilampidae belonging to the subfamily Chrysolampinae.	
Carebara groehni	Sp. nov	Valid	Radchenko, Dlussky & Gröhn	Late Eocene		Europe	An ant, a species of Carebara.	
Carebara kutscheri	Sp. nov	Valid	Radchenko, Dlussky & Gröhn	Late Eocene		Europe	An ant, a species of Carebara.	
Chrysobythus	Gen. et sp. nov	Valid	Melo & Lucena	Late Cretaceous (Cenomanian)	Burmese amber	Myanmar	A member of Chrysidoidea belonging to the new family Chrysobythidae. Genus includes new species C. areolatus.	
Crematogaster primitiva	Sp. nov	Valid	Radchenko & Dlussky	Eocene (Priabonian)	Rovno amber	Ukraine	Originally described as a species of Crematogaster; subsequently made the type species of the separate genus Incertogaster in the ant subfamily Myrmicinae.	
Curiosyntexis	Gen. et sp. nov	Valid	Kopylov	Late Cretaceous		Russia	A member of the family Anaxyelidae. Genus includes new species C. magadanicus.	
Daohugoa bella	Sp. nov	Valid	Wang, Rasnitsyn & Ren in Wang et al.	Middle Jurassic	Jiulongshan Formation	China	A member of the family Xyelidae.	
Daohugoa longa	Sp. nov	Valid	Wang, Rasnitsyn & Ren in Wang et al.	Middle Jurassic	Jiulongshan Formation	China	A member of the family Xyelidae.	
Deltoxyela	Gen. et sp. nov	Valid	Wang et al.	Late Cretaceous (Cenomanian)	Burmese amber	Myanmar	A member of the family Syspastoxyelidae. Genus includes new species D. engeli. Announced in 2019; the final version of the article naming it was published in 2021.	
Dipteromma	Gen. et sp. nov	Valid	Rasnitsyn et al.	Late Cretaceous (Cenomanian)	Burmese amber	Myanmar	A member of Mymarommatoidea belonging to the new family Dipterommatidae. Genus includes new species D. paradoxa.	
Dolichosyntexis	Gen. et sp. nov	Valid	Kopylov	Early Cretaceous (Hauterivian–Barremian)	Baissa locality	Russia	A member of the family Anaxyelidae. Genus includes new species D. transbaikalicus.	
Eldermyrmex exsectus	Sp. nov	Valid	Dubovikoff et al.	Late Eocene	Bitterfeld amber	Germany	An ant.	
Electrofoenops cockerelli	Sp. nov	Valid	Turrisi & Ellenberger	Late Cretaceous (Cenomanian)	Burmese amber	Myanmar	A member of the family Aulacidae.	
Electrofoenops rasnitsyni	Sp. nov	Valid	Turrisi & Ellenberger	Late Cretaceous (Cenomanian)	Burmese amber	Myanmar	A member of the family Aulacidae.	
Eocalliscelio	Gen. et sp. nov	Valid	Falières & Nel	Early Eocene	Oise amber	France	A member of the family Scelionidae. Genus includes new species E. hongi.	
Eopristocera	Gen. et sp. nov	Valid	Falieres & Nel	Early Eocene	Oise amber	France	A member of the family Bethylidae. Genus includes new species E. bilobata.	
Glenosema electrum	Sp. nov	Valid	Colombo & Azevedo	Eocene	Baltic amber	Europe (Baltic Sea region)	A member of the family Bethylidae belonging to the subfamily Scleroderminae.	
Gynopteron	Gen. et sp. nov	Valid	Falierès & Nel	Early Eocene	Oise amber	France	A member of the family Bethylidae belonging to the subfamily Protopristocerinae. Genus includes new species G. inexpectatus.	
Heteropimpla	Gen. et sp. nov	Valid	Li, Shih, Kopylov & Ren in Li et al.	Late Cretaceous (Cenomanian)	Burmese amber	Myanmar	A member of the family Ichneumonidae belonging to the subfamily Labenopimplinae. Genus includes new species H. megista.	
Holopsenelliscus	Gen. et sp. nov	Valid	Engel	Late Cretaceous (Cenomanian)	Burmese amber	Myanmar	A member of the family Bethylidae. Genus includes new species H. pankowskiorum.	
Hybristodryinus anomalus	Sp. nov	Valid	Perkovsky et al.	Late Cretaceous (Cenomanian)	Burmese amber	Myanmar	A member of the family Dryinidae.	
Hybristodryinus concavifrons	Sp. nov	Valid	Perkovsky et al.	Late Cretaceous (Cenomanian)	Burmese amber	Myanmar	A member of the family Dryinidae.	
Hybristodryinus cretacicus	Sp. nov	Valid	Perkovsky et al.	Late Cretaceous (Cenomanian)	Burmese amber	Myanmar	A member of the family Dryinidae.	
Hybristodryinus karen	Sp. nov	Valid	Perkovsky et al.	Late Cretaceous (Cenomanian)	Burmese amber	Myanmar	A member of the family Dryinidae.	
Hybristodryinus kayin	Sp. nov	Valid	Perkovsky et al.	Late Cretaceous (Cenomanian)	Burmese amber	Myanmar	A member of the family Dryinidae.	
Hybristodryinus konbaung	Sp. nov	Valid	Perkovsky et al.	Late Cretaceous (Cenomanian)	Burmese amber	Myanmar	A member of the family Dryinidae.	
Hybristodryinus ligulatus	Sp. nov	Valid	Perkovsky et al.	Late Cretaceous (Cenomanian)	Burmese amber	Myanmar	A member of the family Dryinidae.	
Hybristodryinus magnificus	Sp. nov	Valid	Perkovsky et al.	Late Cretaceous (Cenomanian)	Burmese amber	Myanmar	A member of the family Dryinidae.	
Hybristodryinus mon	Sp. nov	Valid	Perkovsky et al.	Late Cretaceous (Cenomanian)	Burmese amber	Myanmar	A member of the family Dryinidae.	
Hybristodryinus nalae	Sp. nov	Valid	Perkovsky et al.	Late Cretaceous (Cenomanian)	Burmese amber	Myanmar	A member of the family Dryinidae.	
Hybristodryinus pyu	Sp. nov	Valid	Perkovsky et al.	Late Cretaceous (Cenomanian)	Burmese amber	Myanmar	A member of the family Dryinidae.	
Hybristodryinus shan	Sp. nov	Valid	Perkovsky et al.	Late Cretaceous (Cenomanian)	Burmese amber	Myanmar	A member of the family Dryinidae.	
Jibaissodes peichenae	Sp. nov	Valid	Wang et al.	Early Cretaceous (Barremian to Aptian)	Yixian Formation	China	A member of Megalodontesidae.	
Koonwarrus	Gen. et sp. nov	Valid	Rasnitsyn & Öhm-Kühnle	Cretaceous	Koonwarra Fossil Bed	Australia	A member of Proctotrupomorpha of uncertain phylogenetic placement. Genus includes new species K. katya.	
Linguamyrmex rhinocerus	Sp. nov	Valid	Miao & Wang	Late Cretaceous (Cenomanian)	Burmese amber	Myanmar	A haidomyrmecine ant.	Linguamyrmex rhinocerus
Mangus	Gen. et sp. nov	Valid	Kopylov	Early Cretaceous (Aptian)		Mongolia	A member of the family Anaxyelidae. Genus includes new species M. magnus.	
Manlaya magna	Sp. nov	Valid	Li et al.	Early Cretaceous	Yixian Formation	China	A member of Apocrita belonging to the family Baissidae.	
Manlaya proba	Sp. nov	Valid	Li et al.	Early Cretaceous	Yixian Formation	China	A member of Apocrita belonging to the family Baissidae.	
Manlaya ultima	Sp. nov	Valid	Li et al.	Early Cretaceous	Yixian Formation	China	A member of Apocrita belonging to the family Baissidae.	
Mesepipolaea parva	Sp. nov	Valid	Li et al.	Early Cretaceous	Yixian Formation	China	A member of Apocrita belonging to the family Baissidae.	
Nothepyris pretiosus	Sp. nov	Valid	Colombo & Azevedo	Eocene	Baltic amber	Europe (Baltic Sea region)	A member of the family Bethylidae belonging to the subfamily Scleroderminae.	
Paleoscleroderma	Gen. et sp. nov	Valid	Falières & Nel	Earliest Eocene		France	A member of the family Bethylidae belonging to the subfamily Scleroderminae. The type species is P. lamarrei.	
Paleosyncrasis	Gen. et sp. nov	Valid	Poinar	Late Cretaceous (Cenomanian)	Burmese amber	Myanmar	A member of Evanioidea belonging to the family Praeaulacidae. Genus includes new species P. hongi.	
Parasyntexis	Gen. et sp. nov	Valid	Kopylov	Early Cretaceous		Russia	A member of the family Anaxyelidae. Genus includes new species P. khasurtensis.	
Pheidole anticua	Sp. nov	Valid	Casadei-Ferreira, Chaul & Feitosa	Miocene	Dominican amber	Dominican Republic	A species of Pheidole.	
Pristocera alaini	Sp. nov	Valid	Falières & Nel	Earliest Eocene		France	A species of Pristocera.	
Prosphex	Gen. et sp. nov	Valid	Grimaldi and Engel in Grimaldi et al.	Late Cretaceous (Cenomanian)	Burmese amber	Myanmar	An aculeate wasp of uncertain phylogenetic placement. The type species is P. anthophilos.	Prosphex anthophilos
Proterosceliopsis ambulata	Sp. nov	Valid	Talamas, Shih & Ren in Talamas et al.	Late Cretaceous (Cenomanian)	Burmese amber	Myanmar	A member of Platygastroidea assigned to the new family Proterosceliopsidae.	Proterosceliopsis ambulata
Proterosceliopsis nigon	Sp. nov	Valid	Talamas, Shih & Ren in Talamas et al.	Late Cretaceous (Cenomanian)	Burmese amber	Myanmar	A member of Platygastroidea assigned to the new family Proterosceliopsidae.	Proterosceliopsis nigon
Proterosceliopsis plurima	Sp. nov	Valid	Talamas, Shih & Ren in Talamas et al.	Late Cretaceous (Cenomanian)	Burmese amber	Myanmar	A member of Platygastroidea assigned to the new family Proterosceliopsidae.	Proterosceliopsis plurima
Proterosceliopsis torquata	Sp. nov	Valid	Talamas, Shih & Ren in Talamas et al.	Late Cretaceous (Cenomanian)	Burmese amber	Myanmar	A member of Platygastroidea assigned to the new family Proterosceliopsidae.	Proterosceliopsis torquata
Proterosceliopsis wingerathi	Sp. nov	Valid	Talamas, Shih & Ren in Talamas et al.	Late Cretaceous (Cenomanian)	Burmese amber	Myanmar	A member of Platygastroidea assigned to the new family Proterosceliopsidae.	Proterosceliopsis wingerathi
Rhopalosoma hispaniola	Sp. nov	Valid	Lohrmann in Lohrmann et al.	Miocene	Dominican amber	Dominican Republic	A species of Rhopalosoma.	
Sclerogibba cretacica	Sp. nov	Valid	Martynova et al.	Late Cretaceous (Cenomanian)	Burmese amber	Myanmar	A member of the family Sclerogibbidae.	
Sinuijuhelorus	Gen. et sp. nov	Valid	Jon et al.	Cretaceous	Sinuiju Formation	North Korea	A member of the family Heloridae. Genus includes new species S. baektoensis.	
Stephanogaster integra	Sp. nov	Valid	Li et al.	Middle Jurassic	Jiulongshan Formation	China	A member of Apocrita belonging to the family Ephialtitidae.	
Striaexyela	Gen. et sp. nov	Valid	Zheng et al.	Late Cretaceous (Cenomanian)	Burmese amber	Myanmar	A member of the family Syspastoxyelidae. Genus includes new species S. longicornis.	
Supraserphites	Gen. et 2 sp. nov	Valid	Rasnitsyn & Öhm-Kühnle	Late Cretaceous (Cenomanian)	Burmese amber	Myanmar	A member of the family Serphitidae. The type species is S. draculi; genus also includes second species S. sidorchukae.	
Syspastoxyela pinguis	Sp. nov	Valid	Wang et al.	Late Cretaceous (Cenomanian)	Burmese amber	Myanmar	A member of the family Syspastoxyelidae. Announced in 2019; the final version of the article naming it was published in 2021. Originally described as a species of Syspastoxyela, but subsequently transferred to the separate genus Pinguixyela.	
Syspastoxyela simpla	Sp. nov	Valid	Wang et al.	Late Cretaceous (Cenomanian)	Burmese amber	Myanmar	A member of the family Syspastoxyelidae. Announced in 2019; the final version of the article naming it was published in 2021. Originally described as a species of Syspastoxyela, but subsequently transferred to the genus Striaexyela.	
Tapinoma glaesaria	Nom. nov	Valid	Perrichot, Salas-Gismondi & Antoine	Eocene	Rovno amber	Ukraine	An ant, a species of Tapinoma; a replacement name for Tapinoma aberrans Dlussky in Dlussky & Perkovsky (2002).	
Tapinoma neli	Sp. nov	Valid	Perrichot, Salas-Gismondi & Antoine	Miocene	Pebas Formation	Peru	An ant, a species of Tapinoma.	
Thanacomyrmex	Gen. et sp. nov	Valid	Chény, Wang & Perrichot	Eocene (likely Priabonian)	Baltic amber	Europe (Baltic Sea region)	An ant belonging to the subfamily Myrmicinae. The type species is T. hoffeinsorum.	
Tichostephanus	Gen. et sp. nov	Valid	Engel	Late Cretaceous (Cenomanian)	Burmese amber	Myanmar	A member of the family Stephanidae. Genus includes new species T. hui.	
Tracheliodes grimaldii	Sp. nov	Valid	Melo & Rosa	Oligocene or Miocene	Dominican amber	Dominican Republic	A member of the family Crabronidae.	
Urosyntexis undosa	Sp. nov	Valid	Kopylov	Early Cretaceous		Russia	A member of the family Anaxyelidae.	

=== Mecopterans ===
Name	Novelty	Status	Authors	Age	Type locality	Country	Notes	Images
Dualula	Gen. et sp. nov	Valid	Lin, Shih, Labandeira & Ren in Lin et al.	Late Cretaceous (Cenomanian)	Burmese amber	Myanmar	A member of Aneuretopsychina belonging to the new family Dualulidae. The type species is D. kachinensis.	
Juraphlebia	Gen. et sp. nov	Valid	Soszyńska-Maj et al.	Middle Jurassic	Jiulongshan Formation	China	A member of the family Orthophlebiidae. Genus includes new species J. eugeniae.	
Orthophlebia chinensis	Sp. nov	Valid	Soszyńska-Maj et al.	Middle Jurassic	Jiulongshan Formation	China	A member of the family Orthophlebiidae.	
Tsuchingothauma gongi	Sp. nov	Valid	Zhao et al.	Middle Jurassic	Daohugou Beds	China	A member of the family Eomeropidae.	

=== Neuropterans ===
Name	Novelty	Status	Authors	Age	Type locality	Country	Notes	Images
Achlyoconis jiae	Sp. nov	Valid	Li et al.	Late Cretaceous (Cenomanian)	Burmese amber	Myanmar	A member of the family Coniopterygidae belonging to the subfamily Aleuropteryginae.	
Allopteroneura	Gen. et sp. nov	Valid	Lu, Zhang & Liu in Lu et al.	Late Cretaceous (Cenomanian)	Burmese amber	Myanmar	An antlion. Genus includes new species A. burmana.	
Ansoberotha	Gen. et sp. nov	Valid	Yang, Shi & Ren	Late Cretaceous (Cenomanian)	Burmese amber	Myanmar	A member of the family Berothidae. The type species is A. jiewenae.	
Aragomantispa	Gen. et sp. nov	Valid	Pérez-de la Fuente & Peñalver	Early Cretaceous (Albian)	San Just amber	Spain	A member of the family Mantispidae. The type species is A. lacerata.	
Archaeosymphrasis	Gen. et sp. nov	Valid	Shi et al.	Late Cretaceous (Cenomanian)	Burmese amber	Myanmar	A member of the family Mantispidae. Genus includes new species A. pennyi.	
Buratina	Gen. et sp. nov	Valid	Khramov, Yan & Kopylov	Late Cretaceous (Cenomanian)	Burmese amber	Myanmar	A member of the family Sisyridae belonging to the subfamily Paradoxosisyrinae. Genus includes new species B. truncata.	
Burmaleuropteryx	Gen. et sp. nov	Valid	Li et al.	Late Cretaceous (Cenomanian)	Burmese amber	Myanmar	A member of the family Coniopterygidae belonging to the subfamily Aleuropteryginae. Genus includes new species B. meinanderi.	
Cretocroce	Gen. et sp. nov	Valid	Lu et al.	Late Cretaceous (Cenomanian)	Burmese amber	Myanmar	A member of the family Nemopteridae belonging to the subfamily Crocinae. Genus includes new species C. xiai.	
Cycloconis	Gen. et sp. nov	Valid	Li et al.	Late Cretaceous (Cenomanian)	Burmese amber	Myanmar	A member of the family Coniopterygidae belonging to the subfamily Aleuropteryginae. Genus includes new species C. maculata.	
Doratomantispa hongi	Sp. nov	Valid	Shi et al.	Late Cretaceous (Cenomanian)	Burmese amber	Myanmar	A member of the family Mantispidae.	
Electropsychops oligophlebius	Sp. nov	Valid	Bai et al.	Late Cretaceous (Cenomanian)	Burmese amber	Myanmar	A member of the family Psychopsidae.	
Gigantobabinskaia	Gen. et sp. nov	Valid	Makarkin & Staniczek	Late Cretaceous (Cenomanian)	Burmese amber	Myanmar	A member of Myrmeleontoidea belonging to the family Babinskaiidae. Genus includes new species G. godunkoi.	
Habrosymphrasis	Gen. et sp. nov	Valid	Shi et al.	Late Cretaceous (Cenomanian)	Burmese amber	Myanmar	A member of the family Mantispidae. Genus includes new species H. xiai.	
Khobotun	Gen. et sp. nov	Valid	Khramov, Yan & Kopylov	Late Cretaceous (Cenomanian)	Burmese amber	Myanmar	A member of the family Sisyridae belonging to the subfamily Paradoxosisyrinae. Genus includes new species K. elephantinus.	
Lasiopsychops	Gen. et sp. nov	Valid	Bai et al.	Late Cretaceous (Cenomanian)	Burmese amber	Myanmar	A member of the family Psychopsidae. Genus includes new species L. impunctatus.	
Libanoconis siberica	Sp. nov	Valid	Makarkin & Perkovsky	Late Cretaceous (Cenomanian)	Nizhnyaya Agapa amber	Russia	A member of the family Coniopterygidae. Originally described as a species of Libanoconis, but subsequently made the type species of the separate genus Dolganoconis.	
Mulleroconis	Gen. et sp. nov	Valid	Ružičková, Nel & Prokop	Late Cretaceous (Cenomanian)	Burmese amber	Myanmar	A member of the family Coniopterygidae. The type species is M. hyalina.	Mulleroconis hyalina
Nanoleon	Gen. et sp. nov	Valid	Hu, Lu & Liu in Lu et al.	Late Cretaceous (Cenomanian)	Burmese amber	Myanmar	An antlion. Genus includes new species N. wangae.	
Nothochrysa oligocenica	Sp. nov	Valid	Ngô-Muller, Blot & Nel	Late Oligocene		France	A species of Nothochrysa	
Palaeoconis	Gen. et sp. nov	Valid	Ružičková, Nel & Prokop	Late Cretaceous (Cenomanian)	Burmese amber	Myanmar	A member of the family Coniopterygidae. The type species is P. azari.	Palaeoconis azari
Paleonemia	Gen. et sp. nov	Valid	Claisse, Brisac & Nel	Oligocene		France	A member of the family Nemopteridae. Genus includes new species P. balmeae.	
Phylloleon	Gen. et 2 sp. nov	Valid	Lu et al.	Late Cretaceous (Cenomanian)	Burmese amber	Myanmar	An antlion. Genus includes new species P. elegans Lu, Wang & Liu and P. stangei Lu, Ohl & Liu.	
Protoberotha	Gen. et sp. nov	Valid	Huang, Ren & Wang	Late Cretaceous (Cenomanian)	Burmese amber	Myanmar	A member of the family Berothidae. Genus includes new species P. minuta.	
Protonolima	Gen. et sp. nov	Valid	Makarkin	Early Eocene	Green River Formation	United States	A member of the family Mantispidae. Genus includes new species P. mantispinoformis	
Protosiphoniella	Gen. et sp. nov	Valid	Khramov, Yan & Kopylov	Late Cretaceous (Cenomanian)	Burmese amber	Myanmar	A member of the family Sisyridae belonging to the subfamily Paradoxosisyrinae. Genus includes new species P. anthophila.	
Pseudoneliana	Gen. et sp. nov	Valid	Huang, Nel & Azar	Late Cretaceous (Cenomanian)	Burmese amber	Myanmar	A member of Myrmeleontoidea belonging to the family Babinskaiidae. Genus includes new species P. makarkini.	
Puripolystoechotes	Gen. et sp. nov	Valid	Yang et al.	Middle Jurassic		China	A member of the family Ithonidae. Genus includes new species P. pumilus.	
Sidorchukatia	Gen. et sp. nov	Valid	Khramov, Yan & Kopylov	Late Cretaceous (Cenomanian)	Burmese amber	Myanmar	A member of the family Sisyridae belonging to the subfamily Paradoxosisyrinae. Genus includes new species S. gracilis.	
Soplaoconis	Gen. et sp. nov	Valid	Pérez-de la Fuente et al.	Early Cretaceous (Albian)	El Soplao amber outcrop	Spain	A member of the family Coniopterygidae. The type species is S. ortegablancoi.	
Sympherobius yulei	Sp. nov	Valid	Nel & Jarzembowski	Late Eocene		United Kingdom	A species of Sympherobius.	
Xiaoberotha	Gen. et sp. nov	Valid	Shi et al.	Late Cretaceous (Cenomanian)	Burmese amber	Myanmar	A member of the family Berothidae. Genus includes new species X. bipunctata.	

=== Odonatans ===
Name	Novelty	Status	Authors	Age	Type locality	Country	Notes	Images
Andrephlebia	Gen. et sp. nov	Valid	Bechly	Late Jurassic	Solnhofen Limestone	Germany	A damselfly of uncertain phylogenetic placement. Genus includes new species A. buergeri.	
Antiquiala	Gen. et sp. nov	Valid	Archibald & Cannings	Ypresian	Klondike Mountain Formation	USA; Washington	A dragonfly belonging to the family Aeshnidae. Genus includes new species A. snyderae.	Antiquiala snyderae
Auroradraco	Gen. et sp. nov	Valid	Archibald & Cannings	Ypresian	McAbee Fossil Beds	Canada; British Columbia	A Gomphidae dragonfly. Type species A. eos.	
Basiaeschna alaskaensis	Sp. nov	Valid	Garrouste & Nel	Paleogene	Chickaloon Formation	United States (Alaska)	A species of Basiaeschna.	
Burmastenophlebia	Gen. et sp. nov	Valid	Huang, Fu & Nel	Late Cretaceous (Cenomanian)	Burmese amber	Myanmar	A member of the family Stenophlebiidae. Genus includes new species B. flecki.	
Electrodysagrion neli	Sp. nov	Valid	Zheng et al.	Late Cretaceous (Cenomanian)	Burmese amber	Myanmar	A damselfly belonging to the family Dysagrionidae.	
Eoshna	Gen. et sp. nov	Valid	Archibald & Cannings	Ypresian	McAbee Fossil Beds	Canada; British Columbia	An Aeshnidae dragonfly. Type species E. thompsonensis.	
Gunterbechlya	Gen. et sp. nov	Valid	Huang, Fu & Nel	Late Cretaceous (Cenomanian)	Burmese amber	Myanmar	A putative member of the family Gomphidae. Genus includes new species G. pumilio.	
Idemlinea	Gen. et sp. nov	Valid	Archibald & Cannings	Ypresian	Klondike Mountain Formation	USA; Washington	An Aeshnidae dragonfly. Type species I. versatilis.	Idemlinea versatilis
Jurahemiphlebia	Gen. et sp. nov	Valid	Bechly	Late Jurassic	Solnhofen Limestone	Germany	A damselfly belonging to the family Hemiphlebiidae. Genus includes new species J. haeckeli.	
Jurassophlebia	Gen. et sp. nov	Valid	Zheng et al.	Early Jurassic	Badaowan Formation	China	A damsel-dragonfly belonging to the family Campterophlebiidae. Genus includes new species J. xinjiangensis.	
Kachinaeshna	Gen. et sp. nov	Valid	Zheng, Nel & Wang in Zheng et al.	Late Cretaceous (Cenomanian)	Burmese amber	Myanmar	A dragonfly belonging to the family Gomphaeschnidae. Genus includes new species K. zhuoi.	
Libanocordulia	Gen. et sp. nov	Valid	Azar et al.	Late Cretaceous (Cenomanian)		Lebanon	A dragonfly. Genus includes new species L. debiei.	
Libanoliupanshania	Gen. et sp. nov	Valid	Azar et al.	Late Cretaceous (Cenomanian)		Lebanon	A dragonfly. Genus includes new species L. mimi.	
Molertrum	Gen. et sp. nov	Valid	Zessin	Eocene (Ypresian)	Fur Formation	Denmark	A member of the family Libellulidae. The type species is M. eburneum.	
Moltenagrion	Gen. et sp. nov	Valid	Deregnaucourt et al.	Triassic	Molteno Formation	South Africa	A damselfly-like stem-odonate. Genus includes new species M. koningskroonensis.	
Nelala	Gen. et sp. nov	Valid	Petrulevičius	Eocene		Argentina	A member of the family Frenguelliidae. Genus includes new species N. chori.	
Parabaissaeshna	Gen. et sp. nov	Valid	Bechly & Rasmussen	Early Eocene	Fur Formation	Denmark	A dragonfly belonging to the family Aeshnidae. Genus includes new species P. ejerslevense.	
Proaeschna	Gen. et sp. nov	Valid	Wei et al.	Late Cretaceous (Cenomanian)	Burmese amber	Myanmar	A dragonfly belonging to the family Burmaeshnidae. Genus includes new species P. zhangi.	
Randecktrum	Gen. et sp. nov	Valid	Zessin	Miocene		Germany	A dragonfly belonging to the family Libellulidae. The type species is R. ebi.	
Reschiostenophlebia	Gen. et sp. nov	Valid	Bechly	Late Jurassic	Solnhofen Limestone	Germany	A member of the family Stenophlebiidae. Genus includes new species R. koschnyi.	
Steleopteron cretacicus	Sp. nov	Valid	Zheng, Nel & Jarzembowski	Early Cretaceous	Wealden Group	United Kingdom	A damselfly.	
Ypshna	Gen. et 2 sp. nov	Valid	Archibald & Cannings	Ypresian	McAbee Fossil Beds	Canada; British Columbia	An Aeshnidae dragonfly. Type species Y. latipennata, and including Y. brownleei from the Klondike Mountain Formation.	Ypshna brownleei

=== Orthopterans ===
Name	Novelty	Status	Authors	Age	Type locality	Country	Notes	Images
Achetomorpha	Gen. et sp. nov	Valid	Gorochov	Late Eocene		United Kingdom	The type species is A. irregularis.	
Archepseudophylla nanzhaoica	Sp. nov	Valid	Nel et al.	Miocene		China	A member of the family Tettigoniidae.	
Archepseudophylla wenshanensis	Sp. nov	Valid	Nel et al.	Miocene		China	A member of the family Tettigoniidae.	
Danatettix	Gen. et sp. nov	Valid	Thomas, Skejo & Heads	Eocene	Baltic amber	Europe (Baltic Sea region)	A member of the family Tetrigidae belonging to the subfamily Batrachideinae. The type species is D. hoffeinsorum.	
Fanzus	Gen. et sp. nov	Valid	Zessin	Eocene (Ypresian)	Fur Formation	Denmark	A member of the family Gryllidae. The type species is F. grandis.	
Ontogryllus	Gen. et sp. nov	Valid	Gorochov	Late Eocene		United Kingdom	The type species is O. rossi.	
Paraxya	Gen. et sp. nov	Valid	Cao, Chen & Yin	Late Cretaceous (Cenomanian)	Burmese amber	Myanmar	A pygmy mole cricket. Genus includes new species P. hui.	
Parelcana pulchmacula	Sp. nov	Valid	Tian et al.	Middle Jurassic	Jiulongshan Formation	China	A member of Ensifera belonging to the family Elcanidae.	
Probaisselcana euryptera	Sp. nov	Valid	Tian et al.	Early Cretaceous	Yixian Formation	China	A member of the family Elcanidae.	
Proeneopterotrypus	Gen. et comb. nov	Valid	Gorochov	Palaeocene/Eocene		Denmark	A new genus for "Pteroplistes" danicus Rust (1999).	
Sinagryllus	Gen. et sp. nov	Valid	Wang et al.	Early Jurassic	Sangonghe Formation	China	A member of Grylloidea belonging to the family Baissogryllidae. Genus includes new species S. xinjiangensis.	

=== Phasmatodea ===
Name	Novelty	Status	Authors	Age	Type locality	Country	Notes	Images
Eoproscopia reliquum	Sp. nov	Valid	Mendes, Vasconcelos & Oliveira	Early Cretaceous (Aptian)	Crato Formation	Brazil	Originally described as an orthopteran belonging to the family Proscopiidae, but subsequently reinterpreted as a member of Euphasmatodea and transferred to the genus Araripephasma.	
Granosicorpes	Gen. et sp. nov	Valid	Chen et al.	Late Cretaceous (Cenomanian)	Burmese amber	Myanmar	A stick insect belonging to the group Timematodea. Genus includes new species G. lirates.	
Leptophasma	Gen. et sp. nov	Valid	Yang, Shih, Ren & Gao in Yang et al.	Late Cretaceous (Cenomanian)	Burmese amber	Myanmar	A member of Phasmatodea belonging to the family Pterophasmatidae. Genus includes new species L. physematosa.	
Meniscophasma	Gen. et sp. nov	Valid	Yang, Shih, Ren & Gao in Yang et al.	Late Cretaceous (Cenomanian)	Burmese amber	Myanmar	A member of Phasmatodea belonging to the family Pterophasmatidae. Genus includes new species M. erythrosticta.	
Pterophasma	Gen. et sp. nov	Valid	Yang, Shih, Ren & Gao in Yang et al.	Late Cretaceous (Cenomanian)	Burmese amber	Myanmar	A member of Phasmatodea belonging to the family Pterophasmatidae. Genus includes new species P. erromera.	
Tumefactipes	Gen. et sp. nov	Valid	Chen et al.	Late Cretaceous (Cenomanian)	Burmese amber	Myanmar	A stick insect belonging to the group Timematodea. Genus includes new species T. prolongates.	

=== Plecopterans ===
Name	Novelty	Status	Authors	Age	Type locality	Country	Notes	Images
Avionptera	Gen. et sp. nov	Valid	Schubnel et al.	Carboniferous (Pennsylvanian)		France	A stem-plecopteran belonging to the family Fatjanopteridae. Genus includes new species A. communeaui.	
Burmacroneuria	Gen. et sp. nov	Valid	Chen	Late Cretaceous (Cenomanian)	Burmese amber	Myanmar	A member of the family Perlidae. Genus includes new species B. projecta.	
Burmesoperla	Gen. et sp. nov	Valid	Chen	Late Cretaceous (Cenomanian)	Burmese amber	Myanmar	A member of the family Perlidae belonging to the subfamily Acroneuriinae. Genus includes new species B. expansa.	
Largusoperla reni	Sp. nov	Valid	Chen & Wang	Late Cretaceous (Cenomanian)	Burmese amber	Myanmar	A member of the family Perlidae	

=== Strepsipterans ===
Name	Novelty	Status	Authors	Age	Type locality	Country	Notes	Images
Caenocholax comperei	Sp. nov	Valid	Kogan & Poinar	Pleistocene or Holocene	Dominican fossilized resin from Cotui	Dominican Republic	A species of Caenocholax.	
Caenocholax debachi	Sp. nov	Valid	Kogan & Poinar	Eocene to Miocene	Dominican amber	Dominican Republic	A species of Caenocholax.	
Caenocholax flandersi	Sp. nov	Valid	Kogan & Poinar	Eocene to Miocene	Dominican amber	Dominican Republic	A species of Caenocholax.	
Caenocholax mcmurtryi	Sp. nov	Valid	Kogan & Poinar	Eocene to Miocene	Dominican amber	Dominican Republic	A species of Caenocholax.	
Cryptelencholax	Gen. et sp. nov	Valid	Kogan & Poinar	Eocene to Miocene	Dominican amber	Dominican Republic	A member of the family Protelencholacidae. The type species is C. poinari Kogan in Kogan & Poinar.	
Elencholax clauseni	Sp. nov	Valid	Kogan & Poinar	Eocene to Miocene	Dominican amber	Dominican Republic	A member of the family Elenchidae.	
Lychnocolax legneri	Sp. nov	Valid	Kogan & Poinar	Eocene to Miocene	Dominican amber	Dominican Republic	A member of the family Myrmecolacidae.	
Myrmecolax hageni	Sp. nov	Valid	Kogan & Poinar	Eocene to Miocene	Dominican amber	Dominican Republic	A member of the family Myrmecolacidae.	
Myrmecolax huffakeri	Sp. nov	Valid	Kogan & Poinar	Eocene to Miocene	Dominican amber	Dominican Republic	A member of the family Myrmecolacidae.	
Stichotrema doutti	Sp. nov	Valid	Kogan & Poinar	Eocene to Miocene	Dominican amber	Dominican Republic	A member of the family Myrmecolacidae.	
Stichotrema schlingeri	Sp. nov	Valid	Kogan & Poinar	Eocene to Miocene	Dominican amber	Dominican Republic	A member of the family Myrmecolacidae.	
Stichotrema vandenboschi	Sp. nov	Valid	Kogan & Poinar	Eocene to Miocene	Dominican amber	Dominican Republic	A member of the family Myrmecolacidae.	

=== Thysanoptera ===
Name	Novelty	Status	Authors	Age	Type locality	Country	Notes	Images
Cenomanithrips	Gen. et sp. nov	Valid	Tong, Shih & Ren	Late Cretaceous (Cenomanian)	Burmese amber	Myanmar	A thrips belonging to the family Stenurothripidae. Genus includes new species C. primus.	
Chiridurothrips dominicus	Sp. nov	Valid	Ulitzka	Miocene	Dominican amber	Dominican Republic	A thrips belonging to the family Phlaeothripidae.	
Rohrthrips breviceps	Sp. nov	Valid	Ulitzka	Late Cretaceous (Cenomanian)	Burmese amber	Myanmar	A thrips belonging to the group Tubulifera and to the family Rohrthripidae.	Rohrthrips breviceps
Rohrthrips jiewenae	Sp. nov	Valid	Ulitzka	Late Cretaceous (Cenomanian)	Burmese amber	Myanmar	A thrips belonging to the group Tubulifera and to the family Rohrthripidae.	Rohrthrips jiewenae
Rohrthrips maryae	Sp. nov	Valid	Ulitzka	Late Cretaceous (Cenomanian)	Burmese amber	Myanmar	A thrips belonging to the group Tubulifera and to the family Rohrthripidae.	Rohrthrips maryae
Rohrthrips patrickmuelleri	Sp. nov	Valid	Ulitzka	Late Cretaceous (Cenomanian)	Burmese amber	Myanmar	A thrips belonging to the group Tubulifera and to the family Rohrthripidae.	Rohrthrips patrickmuelleri
Rohrthrips schizovenatus	Sp. nov	Valid	Ulitzka	Late Cretaceous (Cenomanian)	Burmese amber	Myanmar	A thrips belonging to the group Tubulifera and to the family Rohrthripidae.	Rohrthrips schizovenatus

=== Trichopterans ===
Name	Novelty	Status	Authors	Age	Type locality	Country	Notes	Images
Cretapsyche palpinova	Sp. nov	Valid	Wichard & Neumann	Late Cretaceous (Cenomanian)	Burmese amber	Myanmar	A member of the family Dysoneuridae.	
Electrotriaenodes mosquensis	Sp. nov	Valid	Melnitsky & Ivanov	Eocene	Baltic amber	Europe (Baltic Sea region)		
Hnamadawgyia	Gen. et sp. nov	Disputed	Wang et al.	Late Cretaceous (Cenomanian)	Burmese amber	Myanmar	A member of the family Polycentropodidae. Genus includes new species H. macularis. Wichard (2020) transferred H. macularis to the genus Neucentropus.	
Khasurtia	Gen. et 3 sp. nov	Valid	Sukacheva & Vasilenko	Early Cretaceous		Russia	A member of the family Dysoneuridae. Genus includes new species K. kopylovi, K. alexeii and K. lukashevichae.	
Plectrocnemia victori	Sp. nov	Valid	Melnitsky & Ivanov	Eocene	Baltic amber	Europe (Baltic Sea region)	A species of Plectrocnemia.	
Terrindusia buriatica	Sp. nov	Valid	Sukacheva & Vasilenko	Early Cretaceous		Russia	A trichopteran larval case.	
Terrindusia khasurtica	Sp. nov	Valid	Sukacheva & Vasilenko	Early Cretaceous		Russia	A trichopteran larval case.	
Wigginsiola	Gen. et sp. nov	Valid	Melnitsky & Ivanov	Eocene	Baltic amber	Europe (Baltic Sea region)	Genus includes new species W. saecularia.	

=== Other insects ===
Name	Novelty	Status	Authors	Age	Type locality	Country	Notes	Images
Belebeus	Nom. nov	Valid	Aristov	Permian (Kazanian)	Belebeevo Formation	Russia	A member of Eoblattida belonging to the family Permotermopsidae; a replacement name for Belebey Aristov (2015).	
Bittacopsocus	Gen. et sp. nov	Valid	Beutel et al.	Late Cretaceous (Cenomanian)	Burmese amber	Myanmar	A member of Paraneoptera belonging to the group Permopsocida. Genus includes new species B. megacephalus.	
Bitterfeldopterix	Gen. et sp. nov	Valid	Mey	Eocene	Bitterfeld amber	Germany	A moth belonging to the family Micropterigidae. The type species is B. lanceata.	
Brevicula teres	Sp. nov	Valid	Tihelka	Early Jurassic (Sinemurian)	Charmouth Mudstone Formation	United Kingdom	An earwig. Originally described as a species of Brevicula, but subsequently made the type species of a separate genus Dacryoderma.	
Cacurgus avionensis	Sp. nov	Valid	Schubnel et al.	Carboniferous (Moscovian)		France	An early member of Panorthoptera.	
Concavapsocus	Gen. et sp. nov	Valid	Wang et al.	Late Cretaceous (Cenomanian)	Burmese amber	Myanmar	A member of Trogiomorpha belonging to the family Psyllipsocidae. Genus includes new species C. parallelus.	
Cyclocelis devexa	Sp. nov	Valid	Sinitshenkova	Permian	Vorkuta Basin	Russia	A member of the family Sphecopteridae.	
Dasyleptus sinensis	Sp. nov	Valid	Liu et al.	Late Permian or Early Triassic	Kayitou Formation	China	A member of Archaeognatha, a species of Dasyleptus. Announced in 2019; the final version of the article naming it was published in 2021.	
Elmonympha	Gen. et sp. nov	Valid	Aristov in Vršanský et al.	Permian (Kungurian)	Wellington Formation	United States	A member of Polyneoptera belonging to the group Eoblattida. The type species is E. carpenteri.	
Enigmaptera	Gen. et sp. nov	Valid	Nel et al.	Carboniferous (Moscovian)		France	A member of Odonatoptera belonging to the new family Enigmapteridae. Genus includes new species E. magnifica.	
Eogeometer	Gen. et sp. nov		Fischer, Michalski & Hausmann	Eocene	Baltic amber	Russia (Kaliningrad Oblast)	A geometer moth. The type species is E. vadens.	
Forcepsites	Gen. et sp. nov	Valid	Fischer & Hörnig	Late Eocene-late Oligocene	Baltic amber	Russia (Kaliningrad Oblast)	A moth belonging to the family Tineidae. The type species is F. michalskii.	
Gulou oudardi	Sp. nov	Valid	Schubnel et al.	Carboniferous (Pennsylvanian)		France	Originally described as a stem-plecopteran belonging to the family Gulouidae; subsequently reinterpreted as member of the family Blattinopsidae belonging to the genus Avionblattinopsis by Béthoux (2026).	
Glaesimeinertellus	Gen. et sp. nov	Valid	Sánchez-García et al.	Early Cretaceous (Barremian)	Hammana amber	Lebanon	A member of Archaeognatha. Genus includes new species G. wallisi.	
Issadiella	Nom. nov	Valid	Aristov	Late Permian		Russia	A member of Polyneoptera belonging to the group Reculida and to the family Tunguskapteridae; a replacement name for Isadia Aristov (2009).	
Klausnitzerellus	Gen. et sp. nov	Valid	Mey	Eocene	Bitterfeld amber	Germany	A moth belonging to the family Micropterigidae. The type species is K. saxonicus.	
Kostovata	Gen. et sp. nov	Valid	Aristov	Middle Permian		Russia	A member of Polyneoptera belonging to the group Reculida and to the family Chaulioditidae. Genus includes new species K. catagrapha.	
Libanoephemera	Gen. et sp. nov	Valid	Azar et al.	Early Cretaceous (Barremian)		Lebanon	A mayfly nymph. Genus includes new species L. inopinatabranchia.	
Macropsontus azari	Sp. nov	Valid	Sánchez-García et al.	Early Cretaceous (Barremian)	Al-Rihan amber	Lebanon	A member of Archaeognatha.	
Macropsontus bachae	Sp. nov	Valid	Sánchez-García et al.	Early Cretaceous (Barremian)	Hammana amber	Lebanon	A member of Archaeognatha.	
Marava neli	Sp. nov	Valid	Engel	Miocene	Dominican amber	Dominican Republic	An earwig, a species Marava.	
Mesoidelia bakhilka	Sp. nov	Valid	Aristov	Middle Permian		Russia	A member of Polyneoptera belonging to the group Eoblattida and to the family Mesorthopteridae.	
Mesophthirus	Gen. et sp. nov	Valid	Gao, Shih, Rasnitsyn & Ren in Gao et al.	Late Cretaceous (Cenomanian)	Burmese amber	Myanmar	An insect of uncertain phylogenetic placement; argued to be a scale insect by Grimaldi & Vea (2021). The type species is M. engeli.	Mesophthirus engeli
Omaliella polonica	Sp. nov	Valid	Dvořák et al.	Carboniferous (Pennsylvanian)	Orzesze Beds	Poland	A member of Archaeorthoptera.	
Owadpteron	Gen. et sp. nov	Valid	Dvořák et al.	Carboniferous (Pennsylvanian)	Upper Silesian Coal Basin	Poland	A member of Panorthoptera, possibly belonging to the family Geraridae. The type species is O. dareki.	
Paleoischnoptera	Nom. nov	Valid	Schubnel et al.	Carboniferous (Stephanian)	Commentry Basin	France	An early member of Panorthoptera; a replacement name for Ischnoptera Béthoux & Nel (2005).	
Paraksenocellia	Gen. et sp. nov	Valid	Makarkin, Archibald & Jepson	Eocene (Ypresian)	Driftwood Canyon	Canada	An inocelliid snakefly. Type species P. borealis.	
Parapalaeomastax	Gen. et sp. nov	Valid	Dvořák et al.	Carboniferous (Pennsylvanian)	Upper Silesian Coal Basin	Poland	A member of Panorthoptera. The type species is P. dariuszi.	
Phanerogramma kellyi	Sp. nov	Valid	Tihelka	Late Triassic (Rhaetian)		United Kingdom	An earwig.	
Saxomicropterix	Gen. et sp. nov	Valid	Mey	Eocene	Bitterfeld amber	Germany	A moth belonging to the family Micropterigidae. The type species is S. schumanni.	
Schistonotorum	Gen. et sp. nov	Valid	Jarzembowski & Wang	Early Cretaceous (Barremian)	Upper Weald Clay Formation	United Kingdom	A mayfly. Genus includes new species S. wallisi.	
Sinitshenkovae	Gen. et comb. nov	Valid	Nel, Lapeyrie & Garrouste	Late Carboniferous and Permian (Guadalupian)	Bajo de Veliz Formation; Salagou Formation	Argentina; France	A megasecopteran belonging to the family Xenopteraidae. Genus includes "Philiasptilon" huenickeni Pinto & Pinto de Ornellas (1978), as well as new species S. gallica (the type species is not designated).	
Siphloplecton landolti	Sp. nov	Valid	Godunko, Neumann & Staniczek	Eocene	Baltic amber	Europe (Baltic Sea region)	A mayfly, a species of Siphloplecton.	
Siphloplecton studemannae	Sp. nov	Valid	Godunko, Neumann & Staniczek	Eocene	Baltic amber	Europe (Baltic Sea region)	A mayfly, a species of Siphloplecton.	
Succinoraphidia radioni	Sp. nov	Valid	Perkovsky & Makarkin	Late Eocene	Rovno amber	Ukraine	A snakefly.	
Taigahymen	Gen. et sp. nov	Valid	Sinitshenkova	Permian	Vorkuta Basin	Russia	A member of the family Bardohymenidae. Genus includes new species T. borealis.	
Wichardius	Gen. et sp. nov	Valid	Mey	Eocene	Bitterfeld amber	Germany	A moth belonging to the family Micropterigidae. The type species is W. fossiliphilus.	
Zorotypus hukawngi	Sp. nov	Valid	Chen & Su	Late Cretaceous (Cenomanian)	Burmese amber	Myanmar	A member of Zoraptera.	
Zorotypus pecten	Sp. nov	Valid	Mashimo, Müller & Beutel	Late Cretaceous (Cenomanian)	Burmese amber	Myanmar	A member of Zoraptera.	
Zorotypus pusillus	Sp. nov	Valid	Chen & Su	Late Cretaceous (Cenomanian)	Burmese amber	Myanmar	A member of Zoraptera.	

== General research ==
- A study aiming to estimate the taxonomic diversity of insects in deep time is published by Schachat et al. (2019).
- A study on the phylogenetic relationships of the Carboniferous insect Stephanastus polinae is published by Beutel, Yan & Kukalová-Peck (2019).
- A study on the age and depositional environment of the Xiaheyan insect fauna (Ningxia, China) is published online by Trümper et al. (2019).
- A study on 240-million-year-old insect fossils from the Mount San Giorgio Lagerstätte (Switzerland–Italy), evaluating their implications for the knowledge of the time scale of insect evolution, is published by Montagna et al. (2019).
- A study on insect fossils from the Upper Triassic Laohugou Formation (Hebei, China) is published by Huang et al. (2019).
- The earliest evidence of exophytic oviposition (eggs laid directly on the outer surface of plants) known so far, in the form of insect eggs (probably produced by roachoids) preserved on plant fossils, is reported from the Carboniferous (Gzhelian) of the Saale Basin (Germany) by Laaß & Hauschke (2019).
- A study on the frequency and diversity of damage types caused by insect oviposition in plants from the Upper Triassic Yangcaogou Formation, Middle Jurassic Jiulongshan Formation and Lower Cretaceous Yixian Formation (China), assessing the degree of plant host specificity, is published by Lin et al. (2019).
- A study on the plant specimens (ferns, gymnosperms and angiosperms) from the Lower Cretaceous Araripe Basin (Brazil) preserving evidence of plant–insect interactions and potentially of paleoecological relationships between plants and insects is published by Edilson Bezerra dos Santos Filho et al. (2019).
- Leaves of members of the family Nymphaeaceae preserving evidence of insect herbivory are reported from the Albian Utrillas Formation (Spain) by Estévez-Gallardo et al. (2019).
- A study on changes in insect and plant communities across the Paleocene–Eocene boundary within the Hanna Basin (Wyoming, United States) is published by Azevedo Schmidt et al. (2019).
- A study on insect pupation structures from the Campanian dinosaur nesting site at the Egg Mountain locality (Two Medicine Formation; Montana, United States) is published by Freimuth & Varricchio (2019).
- Redescription and a study on the phylogenetic relationships of a Permian orthopteran Vologdoptera maculata is published by Aristov & Gorochov (2019).
- A study on the phylogenetic relationships of the Paleocene orthopteran Hylophalangopsis chinensis is published by Wang et al. (2019).
- 308-million-years-old female palaeodictyopteran nymphs, preserving large pointing structures interpreted as ovipositors, are described from the Piesberg quarry in northwestern Germany by Kiesmüller et al. (2019).
- A study on the anatomy of immature stages and adult specimens of members of Palaeodictyopterida, evaluating its implications for different hypotheses about lifestyle strategies of these insects, is published by Prokop et al. (2019).
- A revision of phyloblattid and compsoblattid blattodeans from the Carboniferous (Kasimovian) of the Souss basin (southwestern High Atlas mountains, Morocco) is published by Belahmira et al. (2019).
- A fossil ootheca resembling those of extant mantises is described from the Cretaceous amber from Myanmar by Li & Huang (2019).
- An assemblage of 14 dictyopterans is reported from the Santonian amber from Yantardakh (Taymyr Peninsula, Russia) by Vršanský (2019).
- A study on the anatomy and life habits of alienopterans is published by Wipfler et al. (2019).
- A redescription of a female and a description of a male of the parvaverrucosid species Parvaverrucosa annulata from the Cretaceous amber from Myanmar is published by Węgierek, Cai & Huang (2019).
- A gregarious assemblage of protopsyllidioids belonging to the genus Postopsyllidium is reported from a single piece of the Cretaceous amber from Myanmar by Hakim, Azar & Huang (2019).
- A redescription of the fossil water strider species Aquarius lunpolaensis based on new specimens from the Lunpola and Nima basins of central Tibet is published by Cai et al. (2019).
- New specimens of Mesodiphthera grandis are described from the Norian insect locality at Dinmore (Queensland, Australia) by Lambkin (2019), who interprets this taxon as a hairy cicada and the oldest known cicada reported so far.
- Revision of members of extinct cicadomorphan family Hylicellidae from the Norian Mount Crosby Formation (Queensland, Australia) is published by Lambkin (2019).
- A group of heteropteran nymphs preserved together with their eggs, including two nymphs caught in the act of hatching, is described from the Dominican amber by Hörnig, Fischer & Haug (2019).
- A female specimen of the myopsocid species Myopsocus arthuri is described from the Dominican amber by Hakim et al. (2019).
- A study on the phylogenetic relationships of fossil ichneumonid wasps is published by Klopfstein & Spasojevic (2019), who transfer the species "Plectiscidea" lanhami to the genus Allomacrus.
- A fossilized hind wing of a member of the family Ichneumonidae is described from a Calabrian sandstone from Madeira by Góis-Marques et al. (2019).
- Revision of fossil figitids from the Late Eocene of Florissant (United States) and from the Oligocene–Miocene boundary of Rott-am-Siebengebirge (Germany) is published by Pujade-Villar & Peñalver (2019).
- A study on the evolutionary history of colletid bees belonging to the group Neopasiphaeinae, as indicated by phylogenetic, biogeographic and paleontological data, is published by Almeida et al. (2019).
- The first corydalid larva preserved with gut contents is described from the Lower Cretaceous Yixian Formation (China) by Zhao et al. (2019).
- Seed of the ginkgoalean Yimaia capituliformis with damage interpreted as likely oviposition lesions inflicted by a kalligrammatid lacewing is described from the Middle Jurassic Jiulongshan Formation (China) by Meng et al. (2019).
- A long-necked neuropteran larva, preserving a unique combination of anatomical characters present in various neuropterans families, is described from the Cretaceous amber from Myanmar by Haug et al. (2019).
- A larval lacewing with unusually large mandibulo-maxillary piercing stylets is described from the Cretaceous amber from Myanmar by Haug, Müller & Haug (2019).
- A neuropteran larva with prominent curved stylets is described from the Cretaceous amber from Myanmar by Haug, Müller & Haug (2019).
- A late instar strepsipteran larva, probably belonging to the genus Mengea, is described from the Eocene Baltic amber by Pohl et al. (2019).
- A review of plants, fungi and animals found associated with fossil beetles from Myanmar, Dominican and Mexican amber is published by Poinar (2019).
- A study on the phylogenetic relationships of Tunguskagyrus is published by Beutel, Yan & Lawrence (2019).
- A study on the phylogenetic relationships of Leehermania prorova is published online by Fikáček et al. (2019).
- Extremely miniaturized insects interpreted as larvae of beetles belonging to the family Ripiphoridae and the subfamily Ripidiinae are described from the Cretaceous amber from Myanmar by Batelka et al. (2019).
- A male specimen of the monotomid beetle species Cretakarenni birmanicus is described from the Cretaceous amber from Myanmar by Jiang, Liu & Wang (2019).
- A protrusible prey-capture apparatus is reported in two stenine rove beetles from the Cretaceous amber from Myanmar (a specimen of Festenus gracilis and a specimen representing a new species of Festenus) by Cai et al. (2019).
- The first case of aggregation behaviour of the rove beetle Clidicostigus arachnipes is reported from the Cretaceous amber from Myanmar by Yin & Zhuo (2019).
- Six well-preserved specimens of the silvanid beetle Protoliota, confirming the presence of remarkable sexual dimorphism in this genus, are reported from the Cretaceous amber from Myanmar by Cai & Huang (2019).
- A study on the phylogenetic relationships of extant and fossil members of the scarab beetle subfamily Aclopinae is published by Neita-Moreno et al. (2019).
- A flower chafer belonging to the tribe Trichiini is described from the Baltic amber by Alekseev (2019), representing the earliest fossil record of the tribe Trichiini and the first known flower chafer in Baltic amber.
- Two beetle larvae with unusually large terminal end compared to that in extant forms, identified as representatives of Scraptiidae, are described from the Eocene Baltic amber by Haug & Haug (2019).
- A study comparing extant beetle fauna from Maungatautari (New Zealand) with the late Holocene beetle assemblage from two central North Island fossil sites is published by Watts et al. (2019).
- Poisonous setae are identified in a small caterpillar from the Eocene Baltic amber by Poinar & Vega (2019).
- A revision of putative fossil members of the family Hepialidae is published by Simonsen, Wagner & Heikkilä (2019).
- A study on the holotype specimen of the Late Jurassic acrocerid fly Archocyrtus kovalevi is published by Khramov & Lukashevich (2019), who report evidence of an extremely long proboscis, almost twice the length of the body of this insect.
- A study on the phylogenetic relationships of extant and fossil acrocerid flies is published by Gillung & Winterton (2019).
- A study on the phylogenetic relationships of the Cretaceous members of the family Ceratopogonidae is published by Borkent (2019).
- A study on the morphology and phylogenetic relationships of Lebanoculicoides daheri, as indicated by data from a male specimen from the Cretaceous Lebanese amber, is published by Borkent (2019).
- The first record of chironomid larva from amber, comparable to larvae of modern representatives of the genus Bryophaenocladius, is reported from the Eocene Baltic amber by Baranov et al. (2019).
