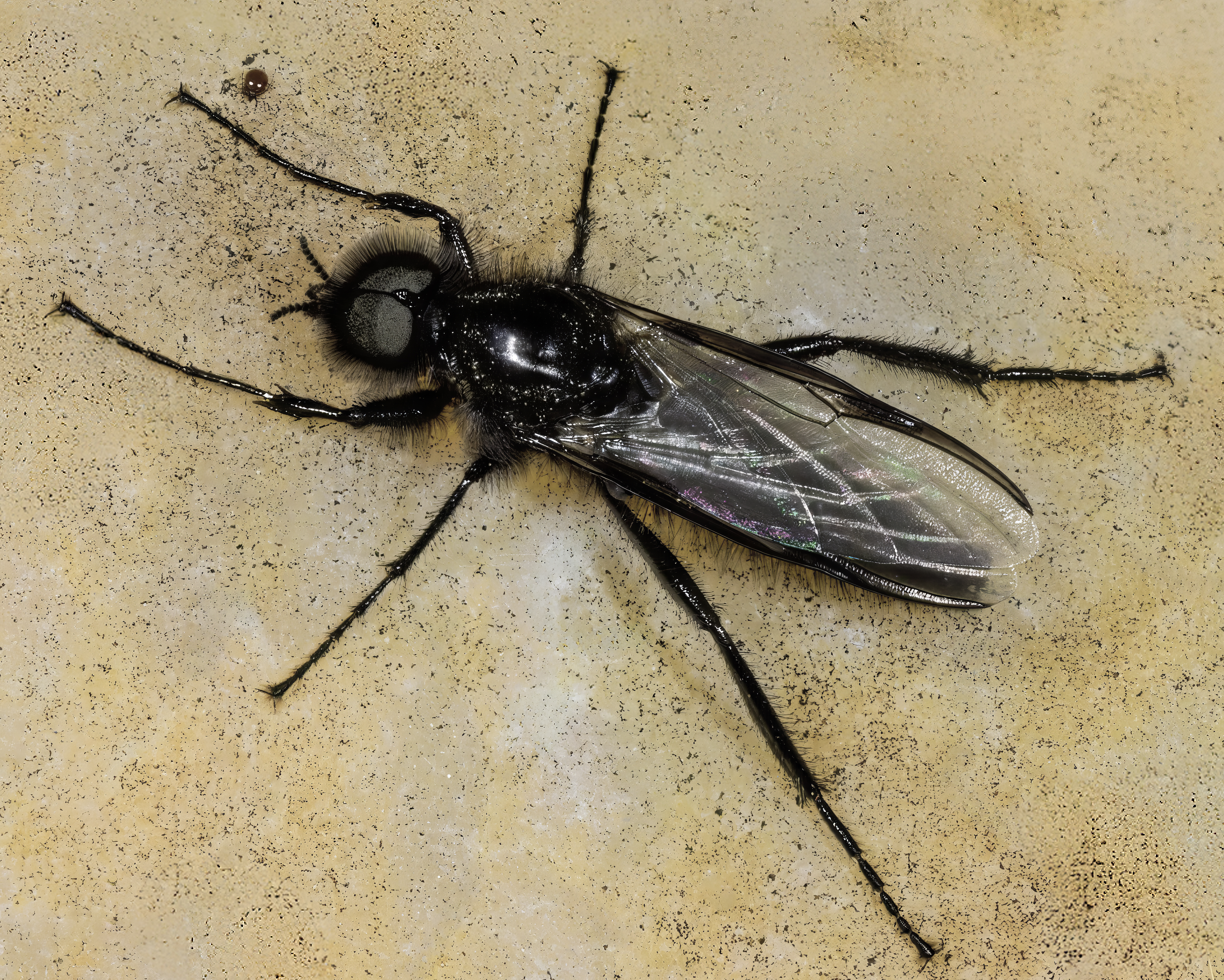
- Male B. marci

Scientific classification
- Kingdom: Animalia
- Phylum: Arthropoda
- Clade: Pancrustacea
- Class: Insecta
- Order: Diptera
- Family: Bibionidae
- Genus: Bibio
- Species: B. marci

Binomial name
- Bibio marci (Linnaeus, 1758)

Synonyms
- Bibio funerosus (Harris, 1780); Pullata funerosus Harris, 1780; Tipula marci Linnaeus, 1758

= Bibio marci =

Species of fly

Bibio marci or St. Mark's fly or hawthorn fly, is a species of fly from the family Bibionidae. It is found across much of Europe. Their common name comes from the fact that the adults usually emerge around St Mark's Day, 25 April.

== Description ==
Adult specimens are usually 12-14mm in length. They can be observed hovering with their prominent legs dangling below. The adults feed on nectar and are considered an important pollinator. The body is entirely shiny black and covered in dark hairs, and the wings are translucent or milky-white with prominent dark veins along the leading costal margin.

The species exhibits sexual dimorphism in eye structure:

- Males have large eyes that meet at the top of the head (holoptic), divided horizontally into upper and lower sections.
- Females have smaller compound eyes set far apart on the sides of the head (dichoptic).

Like most bibionid larvae, they grow up in grassy areas and are herbivores and scavengers feeding on dead vegetation or living plant roots. Adult females usually lay their eggs in soil or decomposing vegetation.

== Relationship to humans ==
Bibio marci larvae are known to be root damage pests of celery, asparagus, roses, saxifrages, lawn grass, lettuce and Polyanthus. They also feed on a very large number of plant species that are commercially unimportant.

=== Agriculture and gardening ===
Adults are beneficial pollinators, feeding on nectar and pollen from blossoms of fruit trees (such as apples and pears) and hawthorn. Although larvae aid in soil formation by processing leaf litter and decaying matter, dense larval populations can occasionally damage the roots of turf, vegetable gardens, and ornamental plants.

=== Fly fishing ===
Due to their seasonal emergence coinciding with early spring fishing and their tendency to be blown onto open water, Bibio marci is well known among anglers under the common name "hawthorn fly". Fly fishers regularly use artificial dry and wet fly imitations featuring long, dangling hackles or rubber legs to target rising trout.

=== Public perception ===
Despite forming conspicuous, slow-drifting swarms around meadows, parks, and hedgerows in late April and May, the species is completely harmless to humans. They lack mouthparts capable of piercing skin, do not sting, and do not carry human pathogens.

== Gallery ==
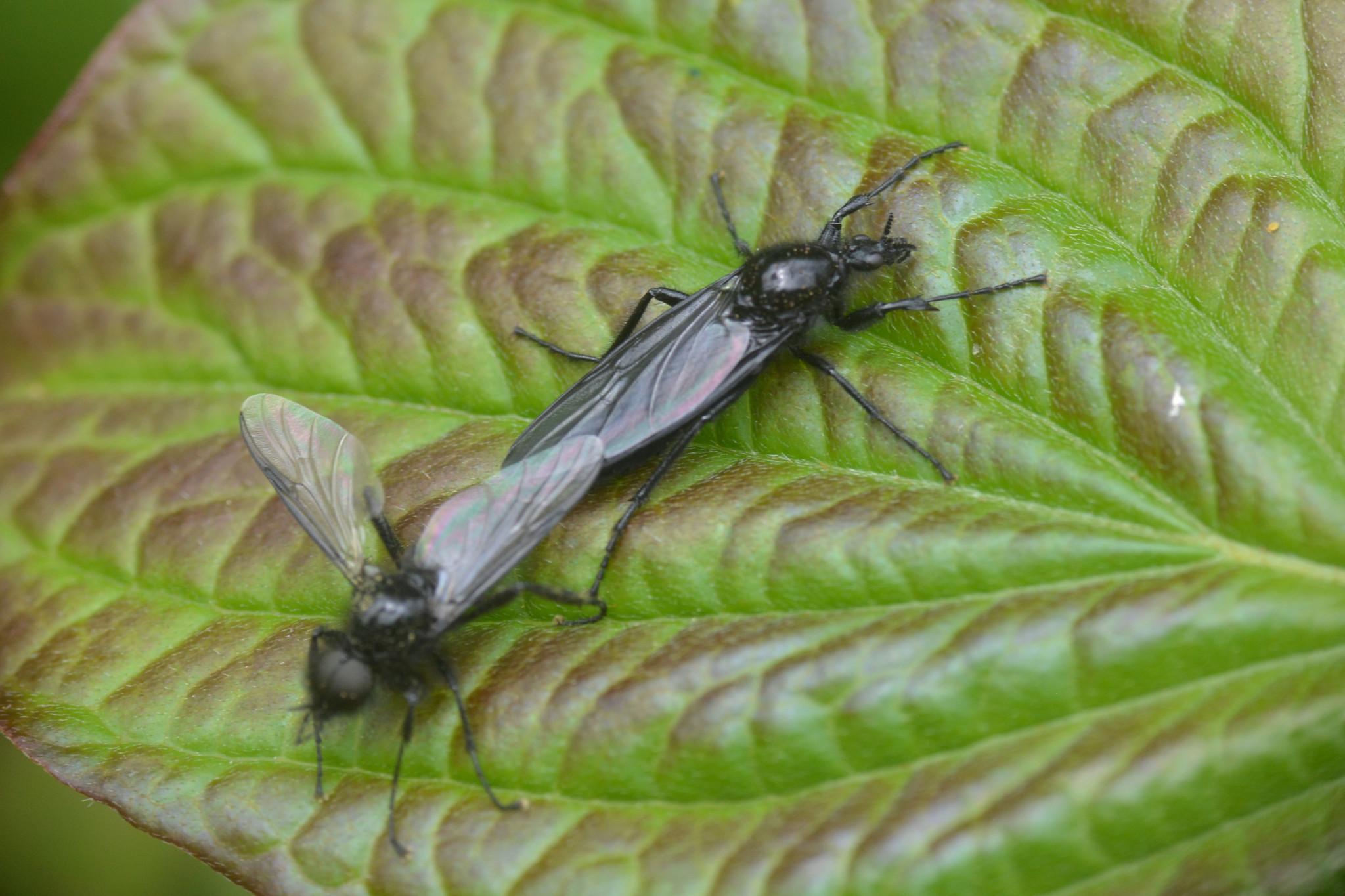

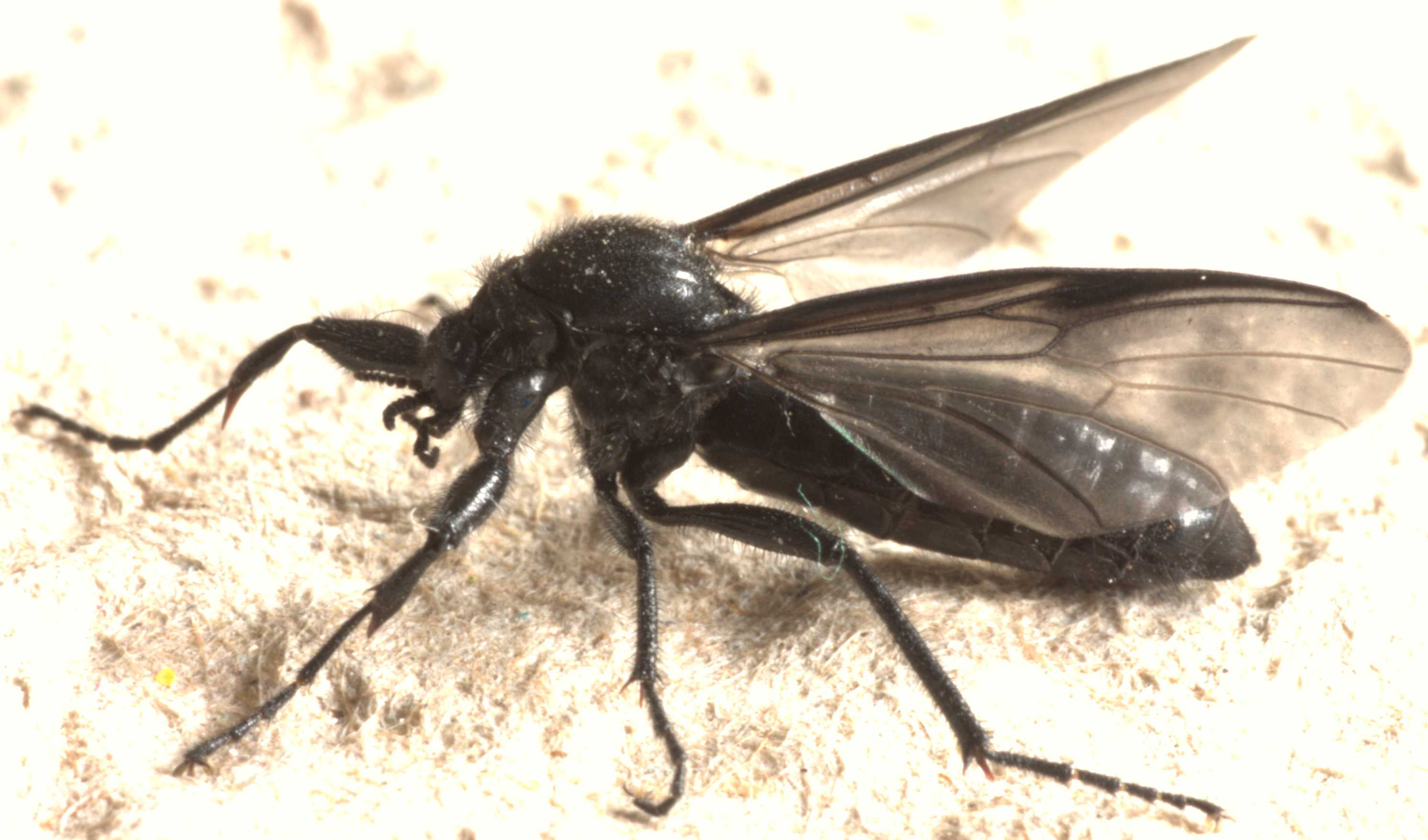

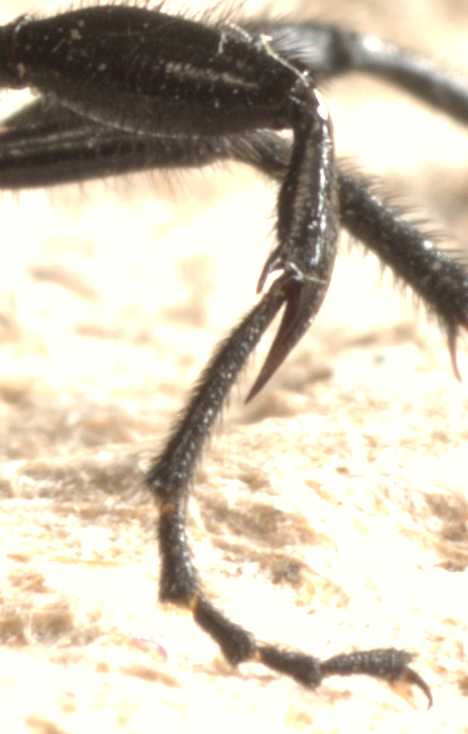

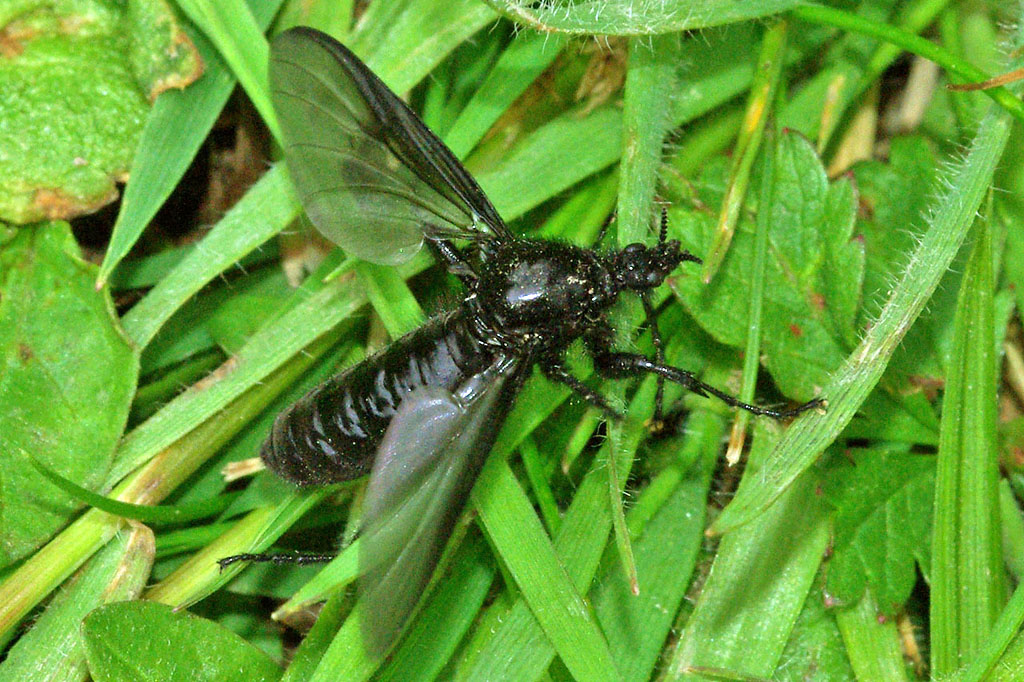

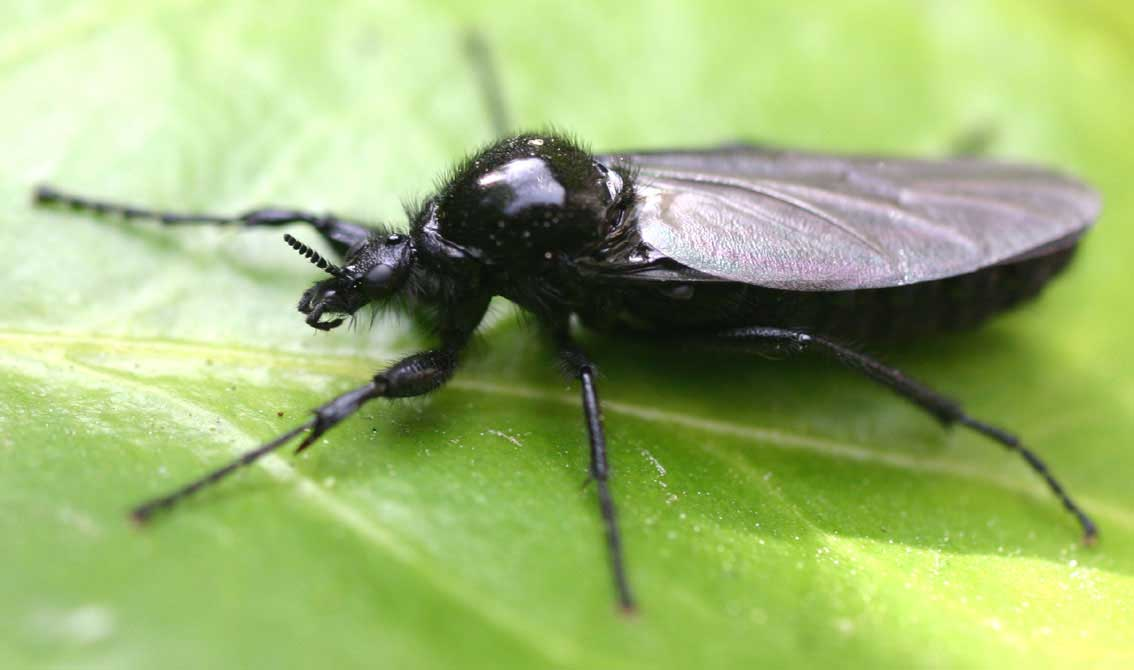

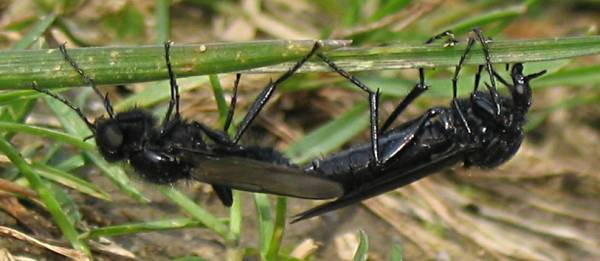
A male and female mating.

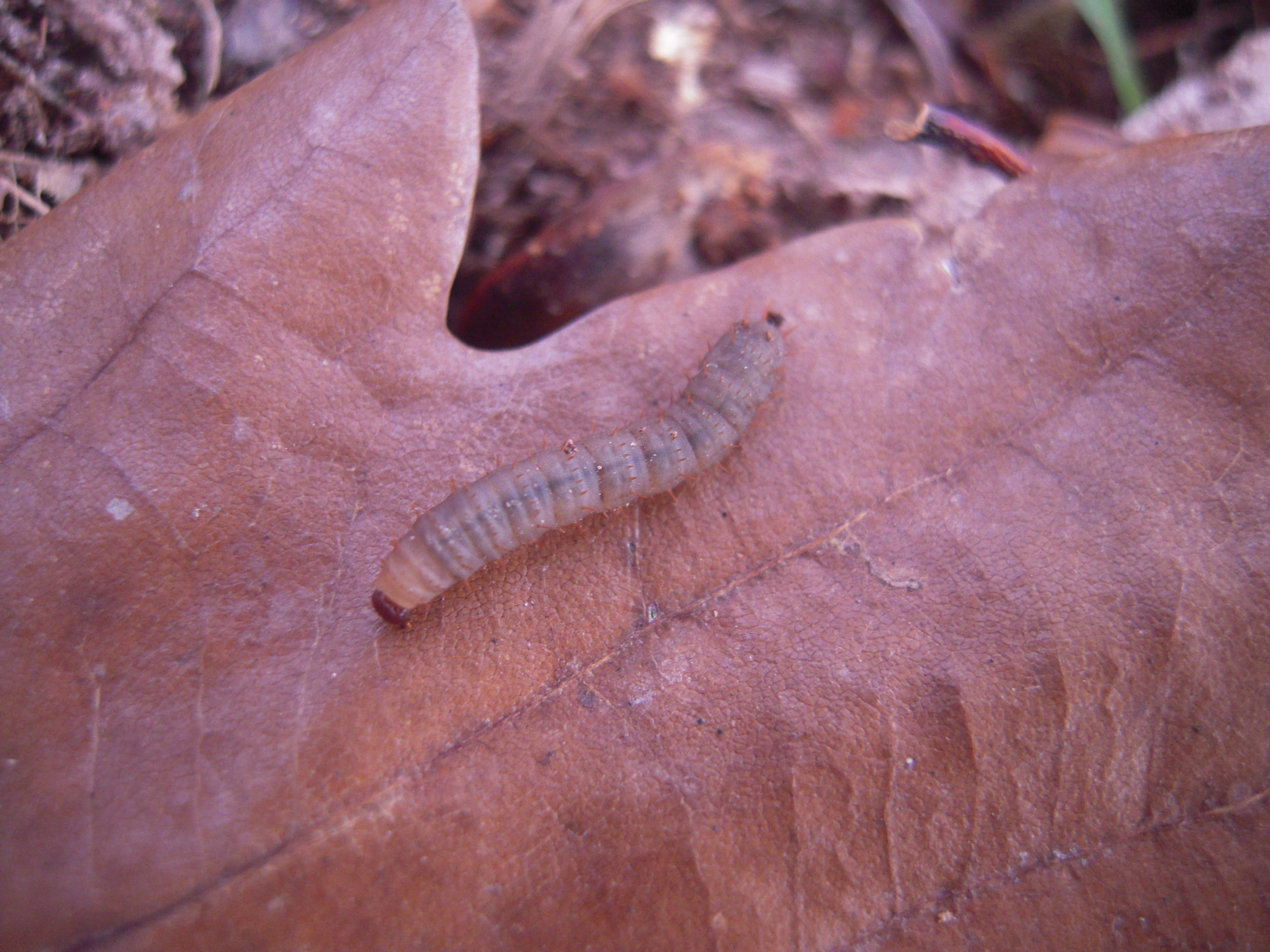
A larva

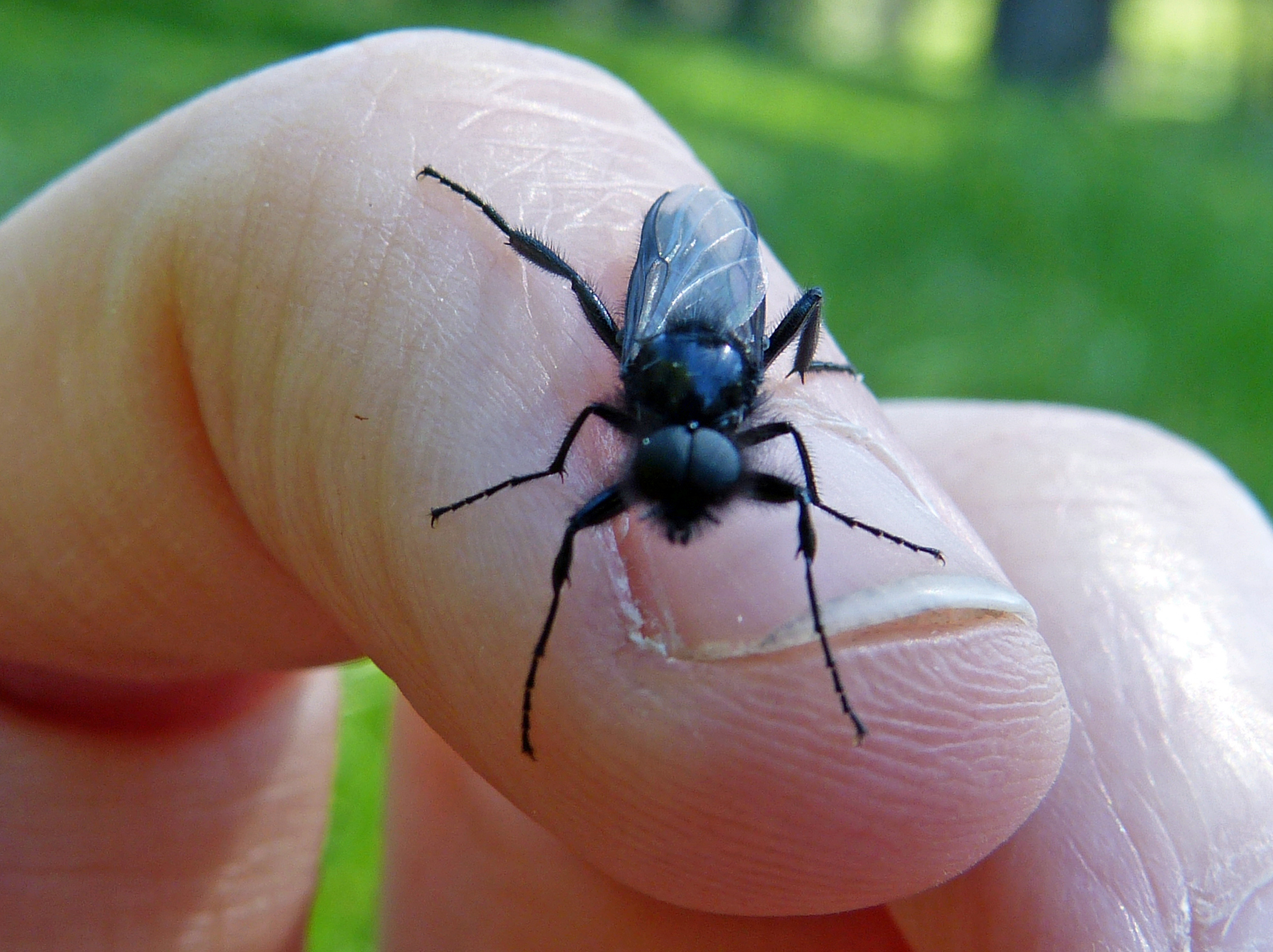
