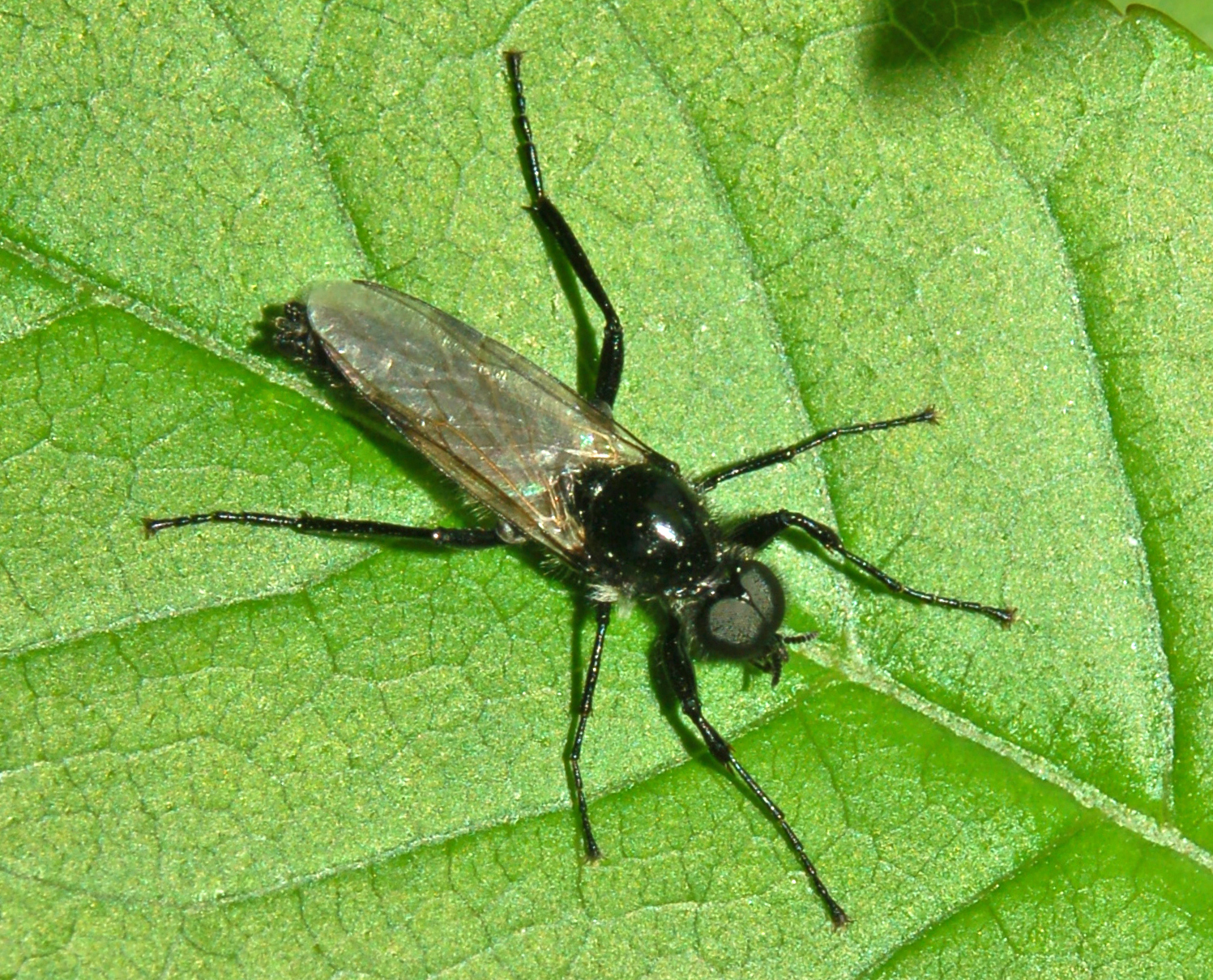
- Bibio hortulanus. Male
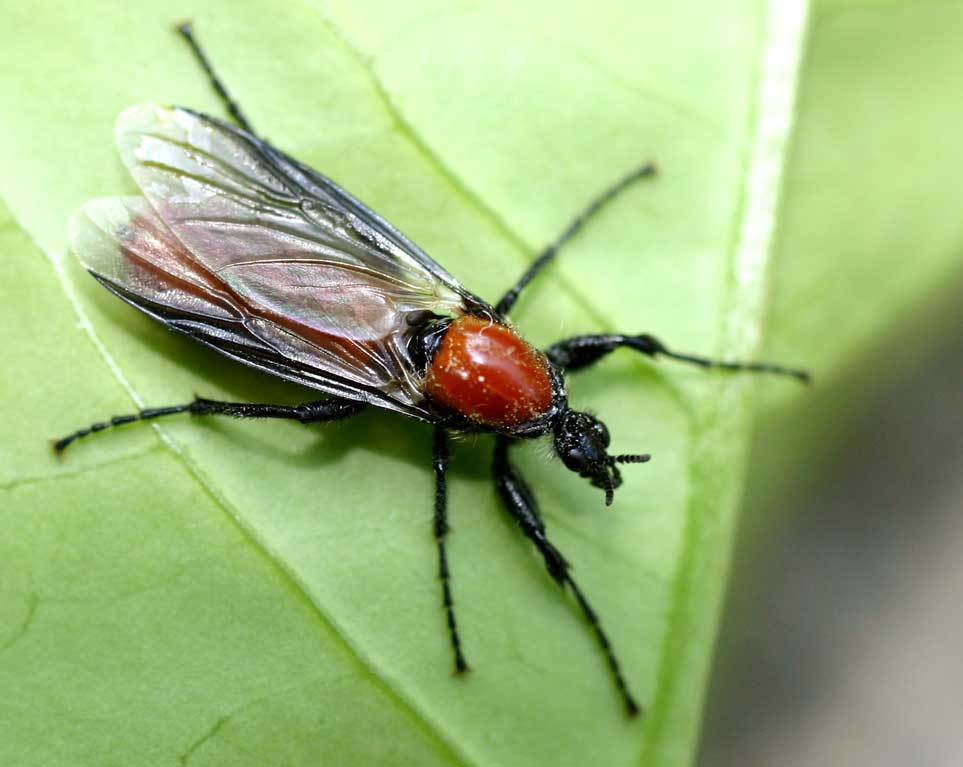
- Female

Scientific classification
- Kingdom: Animalia
- Phylum: Arthropoda
- Clade: Pancrustacea
- Class: Insecta
- Order: Diptera
- Family: Bibionidae
- Genus: Bibio
- Species: B. hortulanus

Binomial name
- Bibio hortulanus (Linnaeus, 1758)

Synonyms
- List: Bibio hortulana (Linnaeus, 1758); Bibio hortulanus var. hirtipes Loew, 1846; Bibio hortulanus var. hispanicus Duda, 1930; Bibio hortulanus var. major Duda, 1930; Musca hortulana Linnaeus, 1758; Pullata citrius Harris, 1780; Tipula hortulanus Linnaeus, 1758

= Bibio hortulanus =

Species of fly

Bibio hortulanus, common name marchfly, is a species of fly from the family Bibionidae.

== Distribution ==
This species is present in most of Europe (Austria, Belgium, British Islands, Czech Republic, Denmark, France, Germany, Greece, Italy, Latvia, Liechtenstein, Norway, Poland, Portugal, Slovakia, Spain, Sweden and Switzerland), in North Africa and in the Middle East.

== Habitat ==
These flies mainly inhabit woodland margins, meadows, flowering crops and hedgerows.

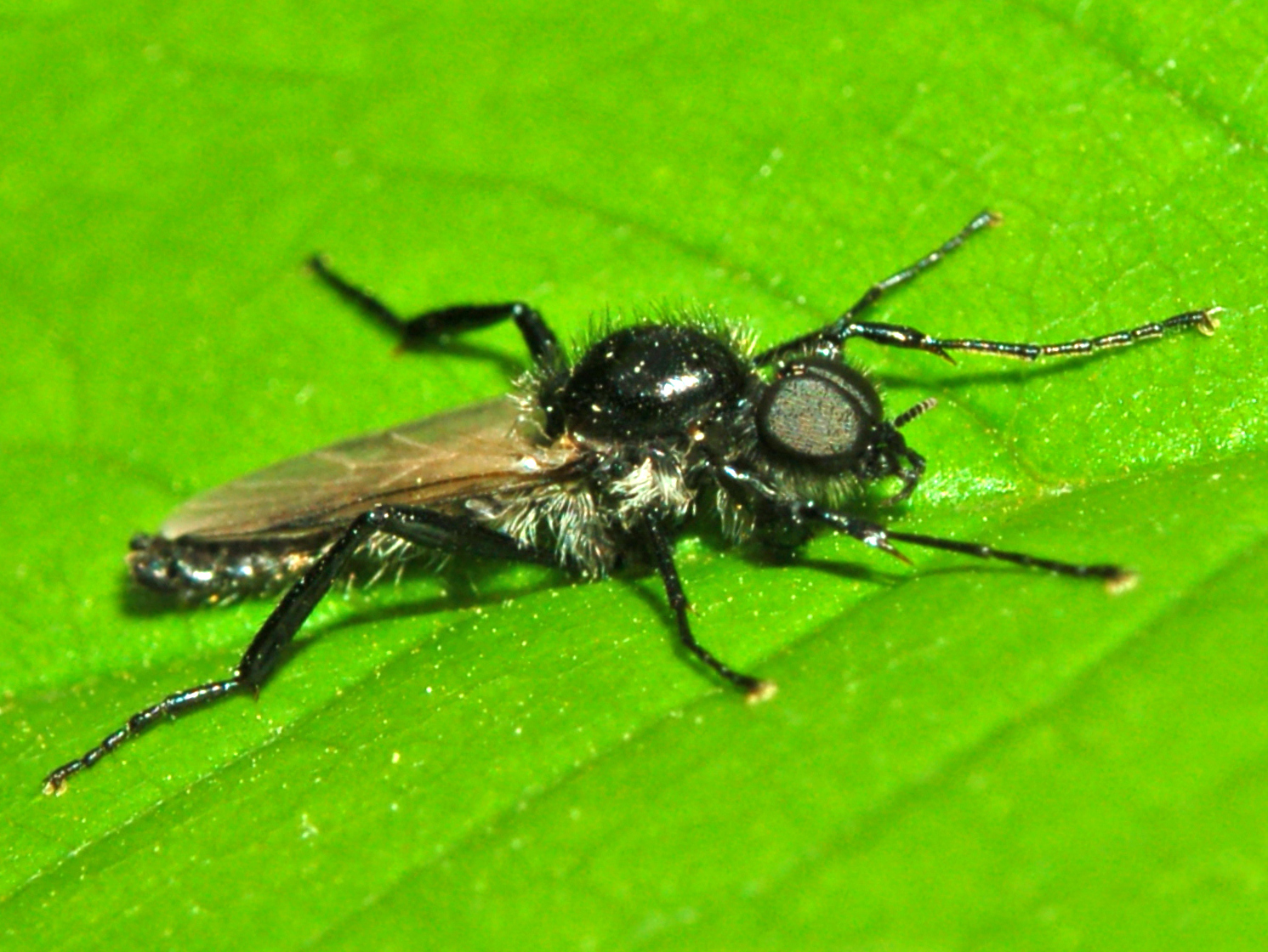
Side view of a male of Bibio hortulanus

== Description ==
Bibio hortulanus can reach a body length of about 6.5–8.5 millimetres (0.26–0.33 in). Wing length is of about 9.5 mm. This species has an evident sexual dimorphism. The body of males is completely black and slightly smaller than the female. The thorax is covered by black hairs, with gray hairs on the sides of breast and abdomen. Head, proboscis and palpi are blackish-brown, whereas legs and halteres are black. The eyes are enormous and contiguous, while in the females they are smaller and clearly separated. The short and robust antennae are inserted under the eyes. Wings are transparent or whitish, but brownish along the costa.

In the females the dorsal surface of the thorax and the abdomen is orange-red, while prothorax and sides are black. Head, antennae and palpi are black. Legs are black. Wings are brownish-yellow, with dark brown costa.

This species is rather similar to Bibio pomonae, but this last species has red-colored femurs.

== Biology ==
Adults can be found from mid March to mid June. They mainly feed on flowers of Apiaceae. The larvae live in the soil and feed on humus. Older larvae feed on dead leaves and roots of Poaceae and can therefore cause considerable damage to clover, cereals and other crops.

== Bibliography ==
- Joachim Haupt, Hiroko Haupt: Fliegen und Mücken. Beobachtung, Lebensweise. 1. Auflage. Naturbuch-Verlag, Jena und Stuttgart 1995, ISBN 3-89440-278-4.
