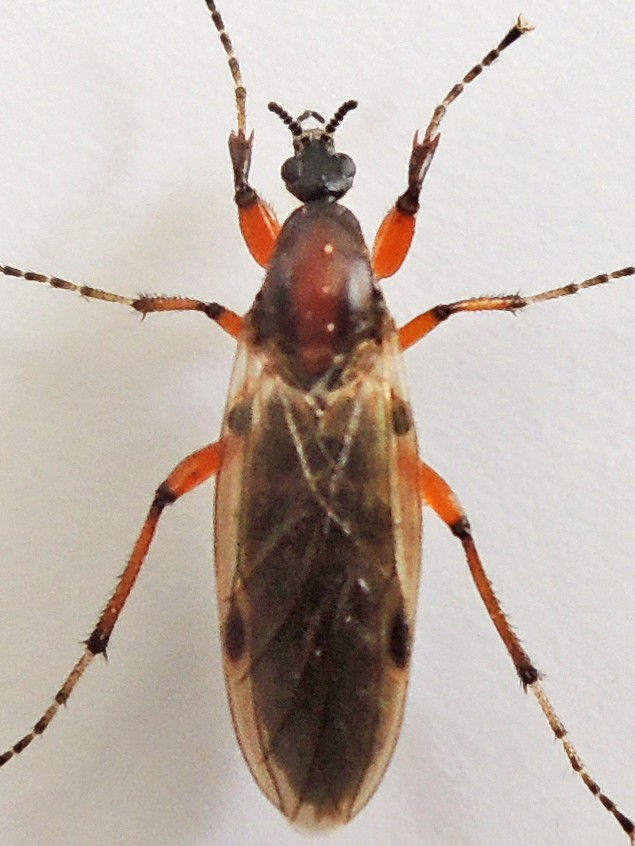
- Female
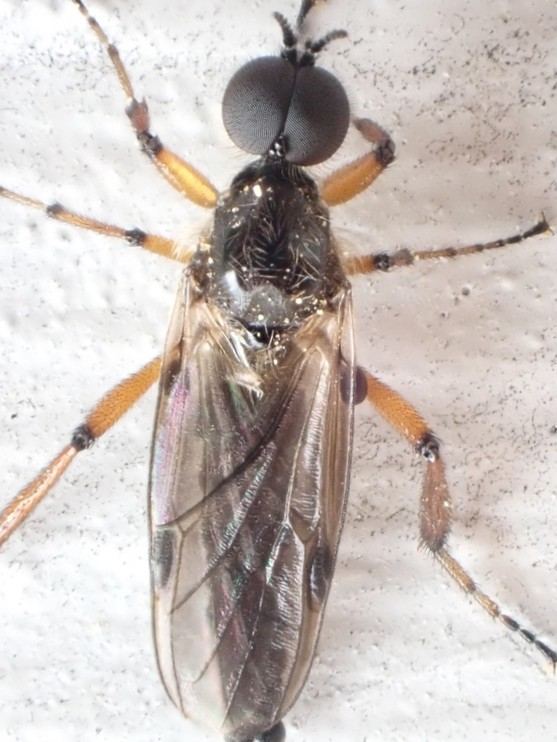
- Male

Scientific classification
- Kingdom: Animalia
- Phylum: Arthropoda
- Clade: Pancrustacea
- Class: Insecta
- Order: Diptera
- Family: Bibionidae
- Genus: Bibio
- Species: B. articulatus

Binomial name
- Bibio articulatus Say, 1823

= Bibio articulatus =

Species of fly

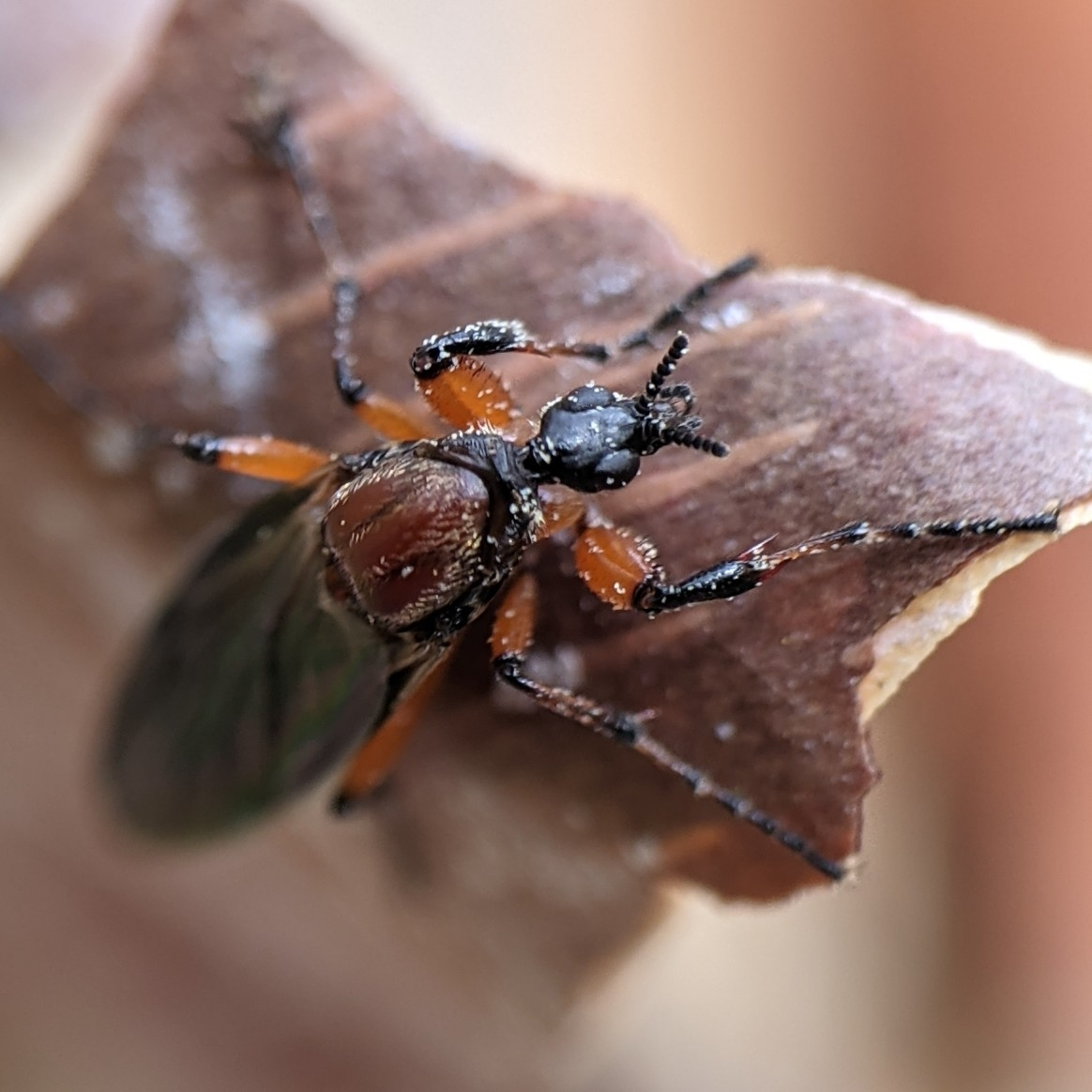
Female with pollen

Bibio articulatus is a species of march fly in the family Bibionidae. Its distinctive features are its dark exoskeleton that varies from black to a deep red, and red/orange legs.

== Description ==
B. articulatus' wingspan is on average ~6 mm. Their femora and tibiae are both colored orange or red, with both inner and outer foretibial spurs the same length, and the foretibia colored brown. Their bodies are black with females having a colored thorax. They have lightly colored posterior wing veins compared to other species.

== Range ==
Bibio articulatus is most commonly found in the United States, east of the Rocky Mountains, all the way to the coast.

== Habitat ==
Bibio articulatus can be found usually in rotting trees, or eating the leaves of plants without causing significant damage. It is also found in loose soil during its reproductive cycles.

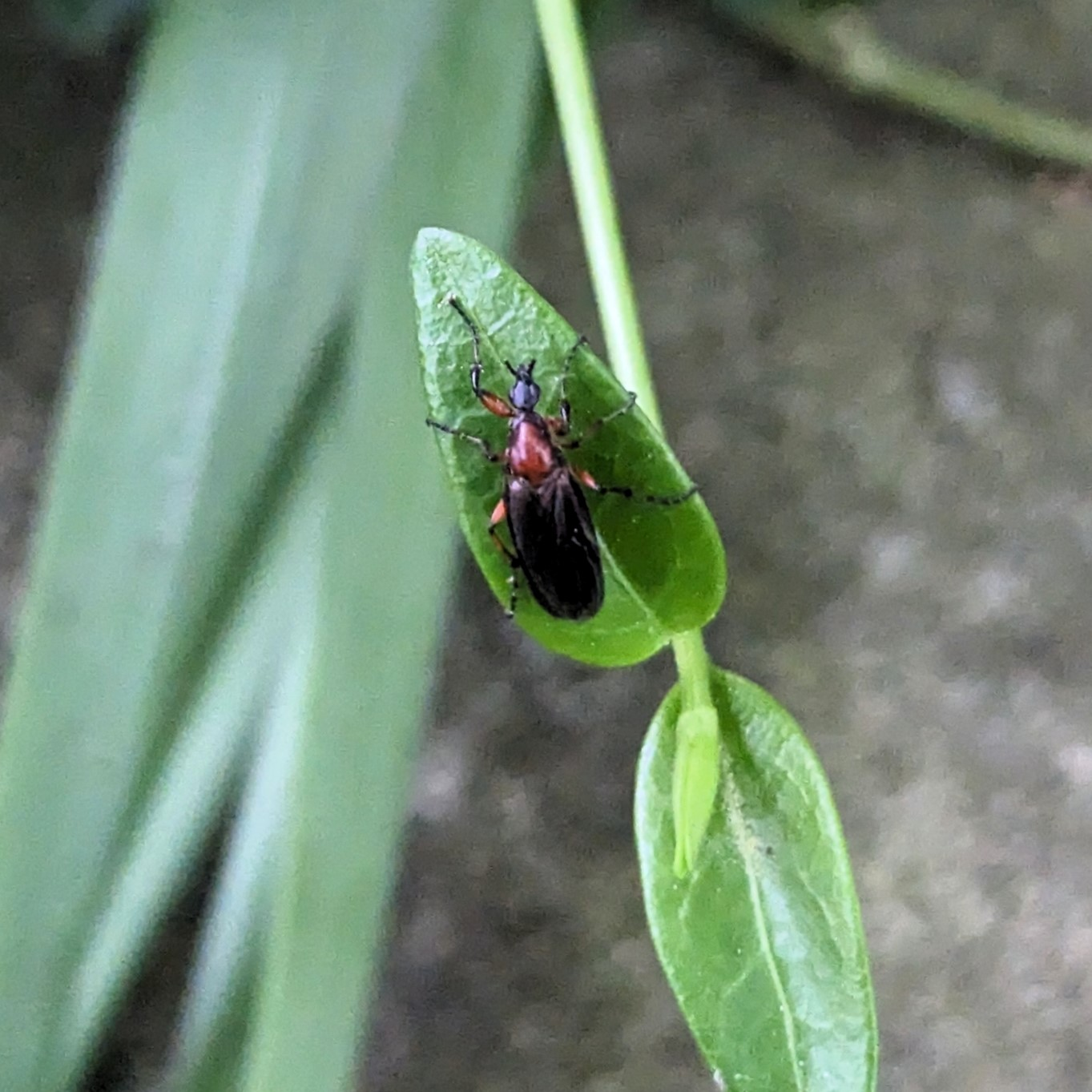

== Sexual dimorphism ==
The sexual dimorphism in Bibio articulatus is mainly limited to eye size and body size, but has a few other varying traits. Male red-legged March flies have eye formations that are dramatically larger and take up most of the head, while females have small eyes that sit on the side of the head; although females are often larger in size than males. Also, females will always have a red thorax and coxae, while males will have black. Males also will have clear wings, while females will have darker shades of black or yellow.

== Reproductive cycle ==
Bibio articulatus will usually begin appearing in March, and be most active during April and May before going dormant during June. After the mating period, the female Bibio articulatus will lay eggs in loose soil or decaying substrate. These eggs are usually small, oblong, and vary in color. The larvae will hatch resembling small, featureless, worms. The larvae will eventually encapsulate itself in a pupa and gain its coloration. At the emergence from the pupa, the adult has functional wings and reproductive organs.
