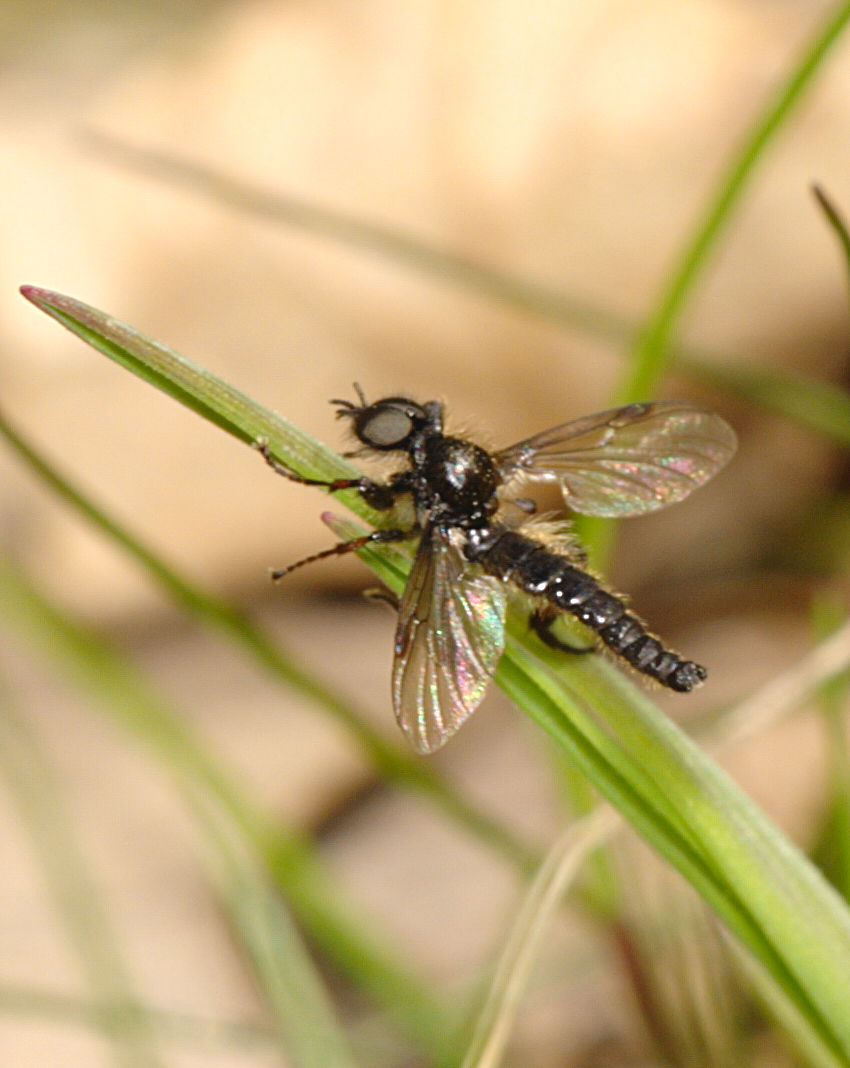

Scientific classification
- Kingdom: Animalia
- Phylum: Arthropoda
- Class: Insecta
- Order: Diptera
- Family: Bibionidae
- Genus: Bibio
- Species: B. lanigerus

Binomial name
- Bibio lanigerus Meigen, 1818

Synonyms
- Bibio hybridus Haliday, 1833

= Bibio lanigerus =

Species of fly

Bibio lanigerus is a species of fly in the family Bibionidae. It is found in the Palearctic.
