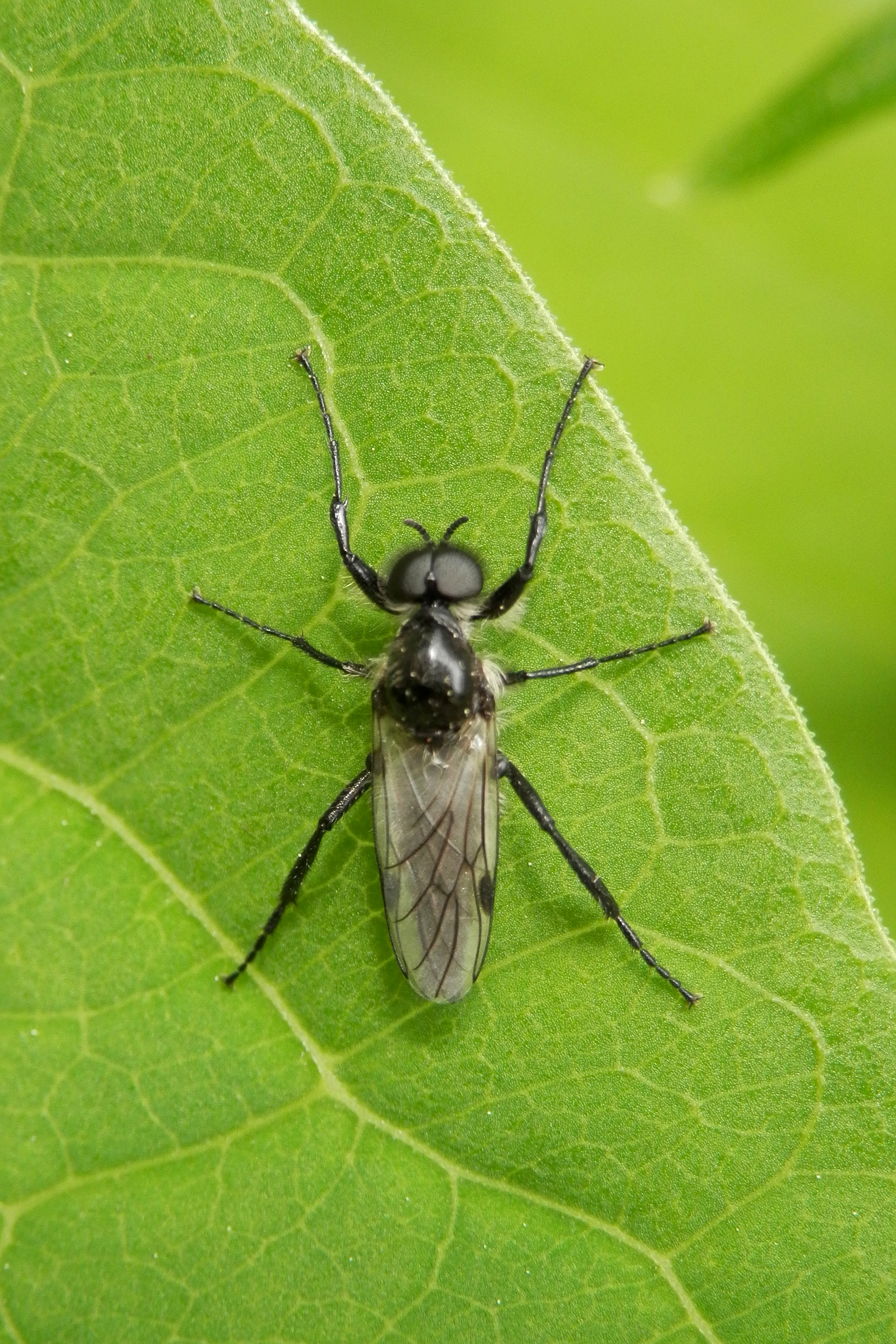

Scientific classification
- Kingdom: Animalia
- Phylum: Arthropoda
- Clade: Pancrustacea
- Class: Insecta
- Order: Diptera
- Family: Bibionidae
- Genus: Bibio
- Species: B. albipennis

Binomial name
- Bibio albipennis Say, 1823

= Bibio albipennis =

Species of fly

Bibio albipennis is a species of March fly. It native to North America, where it is widespread.

The larvae are detrivores. J. W. P. Jenks found them to be a seasonal food source for robins.
