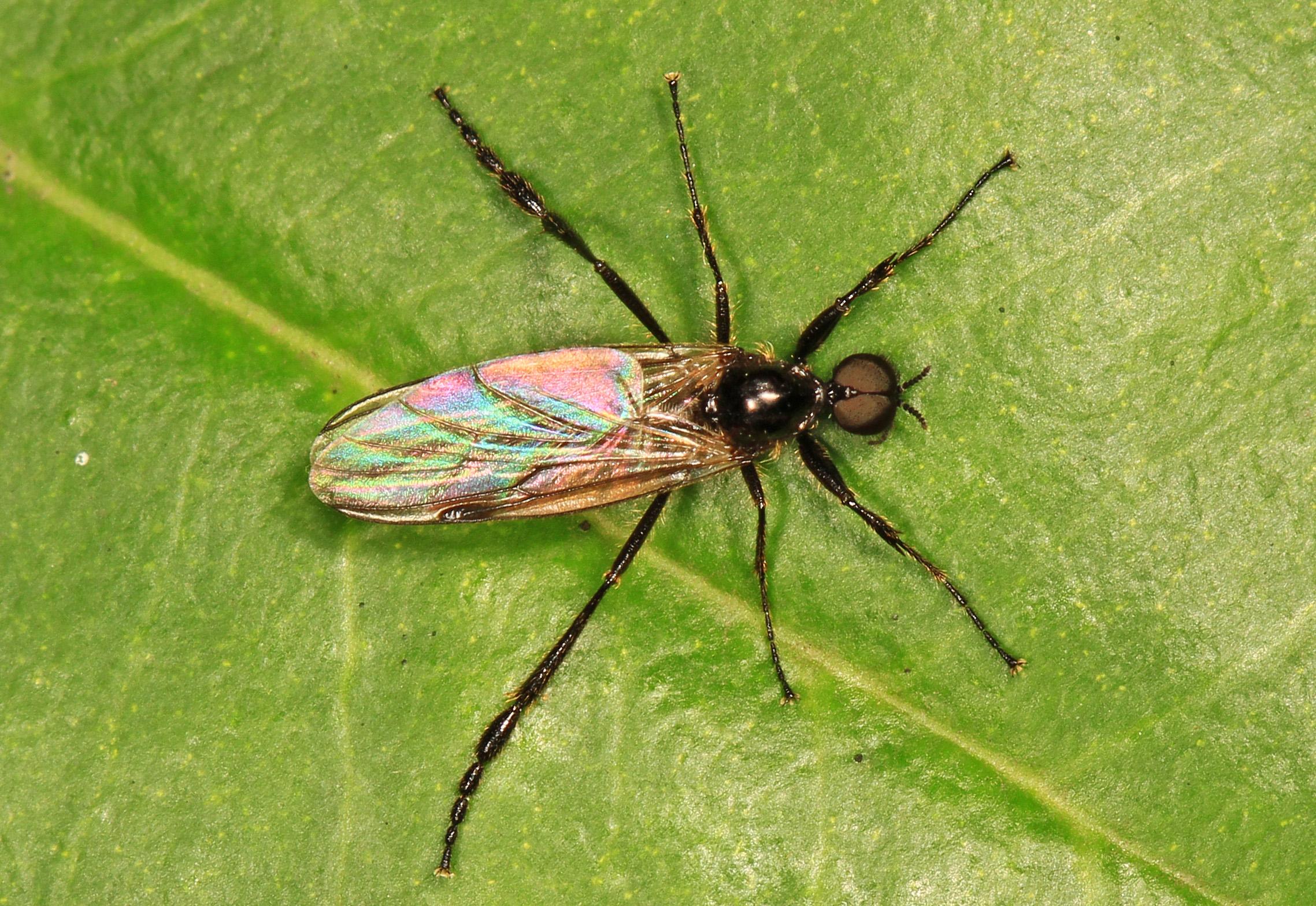

Scientific classification
- Kingdom: Animalia
- Phylum: Arthropoda
- Class: Insecta
- Order: Diptera
- Family: Bibionidae
- Genus: Bibio
- Species: B. longipes

Binomial name
- Bibio longipes Loew, 1864

Synonyms
- Bibio lepidus Loew, 1871

= Bibio longipes =

Species of fly

Bibio longipes is a species of fly in the family Bibionidae. It is found in the Palearctic and the Nearctic.
