= Bibio reticulatus =

Scientific classification
- Kingdom: Animalia
- Phylum: Arthropoda
- Class: Insecta
- Order: Diptera
- Family: Bibionidae
- Genus: Bibio
- Species: B. reticulatus

Binomial name
- Bibio reticulatus Loew, 1846

Species of fly

Bibio reticulatus is a species of fly in the family Bibionidae. It is found in the Palearctic.
