= Bibio alienus =

Scientific classification
- Domain: Eukaryota
- Kingdom: Animalia
- Phylum: Arthropoda
- Class: Insecta
- Order: Diptera
- Family: Bibionidae
- Genus: Bibio
- Species: B. alienus

Binomial name
- Bibio alienus Mcatee, 1923

Species of fly

Bibio alienus is a species of March fly in the family Bibionidae.
