= Bibiodes halteralis =

Scientific classification
- Domain: Eukaryota
- Kingdom: Animalia
- Phylum: Arthropoda
- Class: Insecta
- Order: Diptera
- Family: Bibionidae
- Genus: Bibiodes
- Species: B. halteralis

Binomial name
- Bibiodes halteralis Coquillett, 1904

Species of fly

Bibiodes halteralis is a species of March flies in the family Bibionidae.
