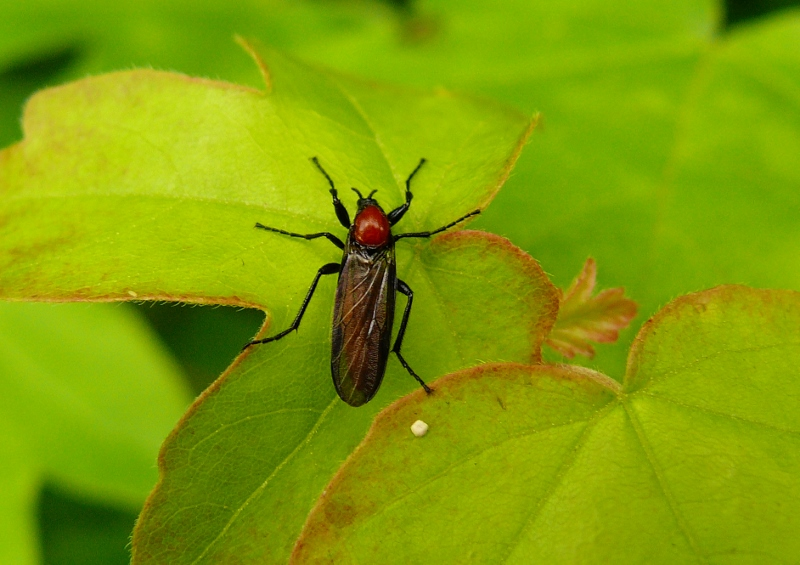
- Bibio anglicus on a leaf

Scientific classification
- Kingdom: Animalia
- Phylum: Arthropoda
- Clade: Pancrustacea
- Class: Insecta
- Order: Diptera
- Family: Bibionidae
- Genus: Bibio
- Species: B. anglicus

Binomial name
- Bibio anglicus Verrall, 1869

Synonyms
- Bibio anglicus Loew, 1869

= Bibio anglicus =

Species of fly

Bibio anglicus is a species of fly from the family Bibionidae.
