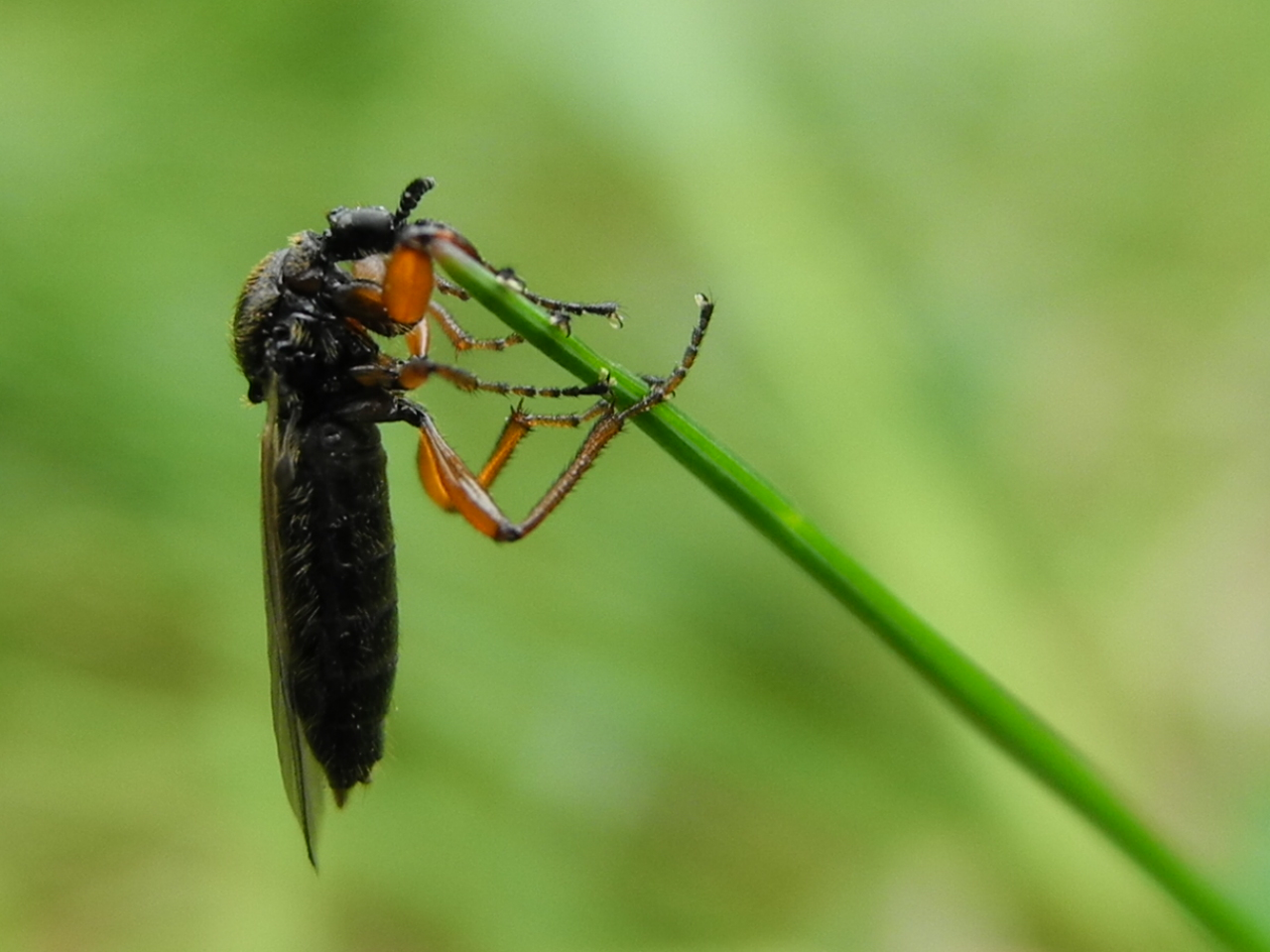

Scientific classification
- Kingdom: Animalia
- Phylum: Arthropoda
- Class: Insecta
- Order: Diptera
- Family: Bibionidae
- Genus: Bibio
- Species: B. varipes

Binomial name
- Bibio varipes Meigen, 1830

Synonyms
- Bibio edwardsi Freeman & Lane, 1985

= Bibio varipes =

Species of fly

Bibio varipes is a species of fly in the family Bibionidae. It is found in the Palearctic.
