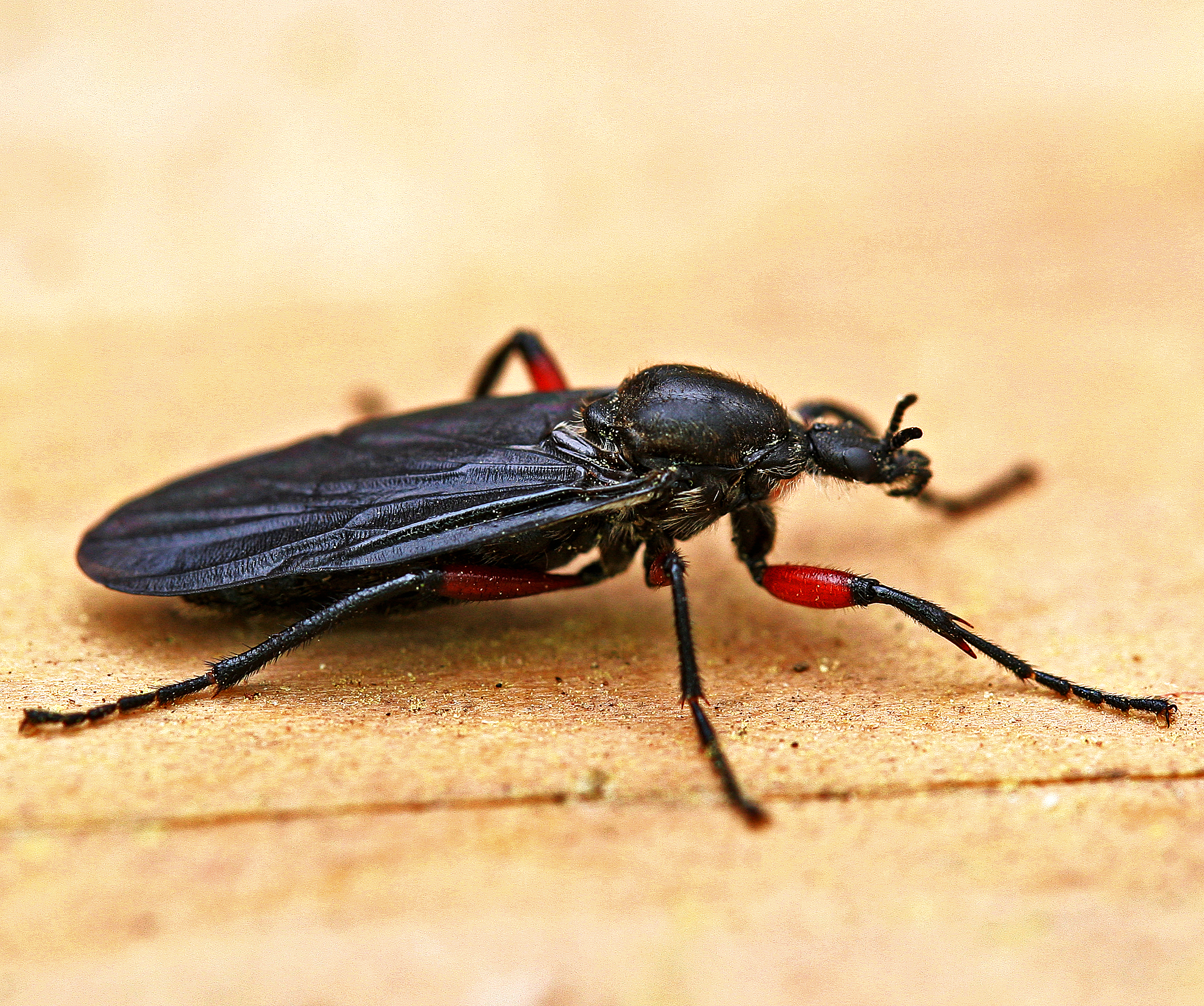

Scientific classification
- Kingdom: Animalia
- Phylum: Arthropoda
- Class: Insecta
- Order: Diptera
- Family: Bibionidae
- Genus: Bibio
- Species: B. femoratus

Binomial name
- Bibio femoratus (Wiedemann, 1820)

= Bibio femoratus =

Species of fly

Bibio femoratus, also known as the March fly or lovebug, is a species of fly in the family Bibionidae. It was first described by the German entomologist Christian Rudolph Wilhelm Wiedemann in 1820.Bibio femoratus is one of at least 90 types of March flies, which occur in the United States and Canada.

== Description ==
Bibio femoratus is medium-sized and usually black, though the thorax and legs can be orange or red. The antennae are relatively short and thick, have 10 segments and are located low on the head. The wings usually have a dark spot on the leading edge about two thirds of the way out away from the body. The adults, which are usually abundant in early Spring, are known to form copulatory swarms, hence the term lovebug. Once fertilized, the females lay their eggs randomly on soil surfaces. The larvae develop during Fall and Winter and feed on decaying organic matter.

Bibio femoratus is a slow and clumsy flier and is usually found a couple feet off the ground. They can be observed tumbling around and flailing their legs in an effort to right themselves. After synchronous emergence, Bibio femoratus forms large swarms of mating pairs. The mating pairs are joined at the abdomen and stay that way for a while. They seem oblivious and unaware of humans as a threat, and will not make any efforts to avoid sudden movements or threatening gestures.

=== Larval Stage ===
Characteristics

- 3/8 to 1 inch long
- white, yellowish or brown legless cylindrical body
- dark brown head
- most segments have short spine-like projections
- feed on decaying plant matter (sometimes grass roots)

Adult Stage

- 3/4 to 1 and 1/4 inches long
- dark brown to black long abdomen; red or orange thorax and legs
- small down pointed head with short 10-segmented antennae
- wings have dark spot on R1 (leading edge, 2/3 of the wing from body)
- feed mostly on liquids like water or nectar

Bibio femoratus gets its name from its bright red femurs.
