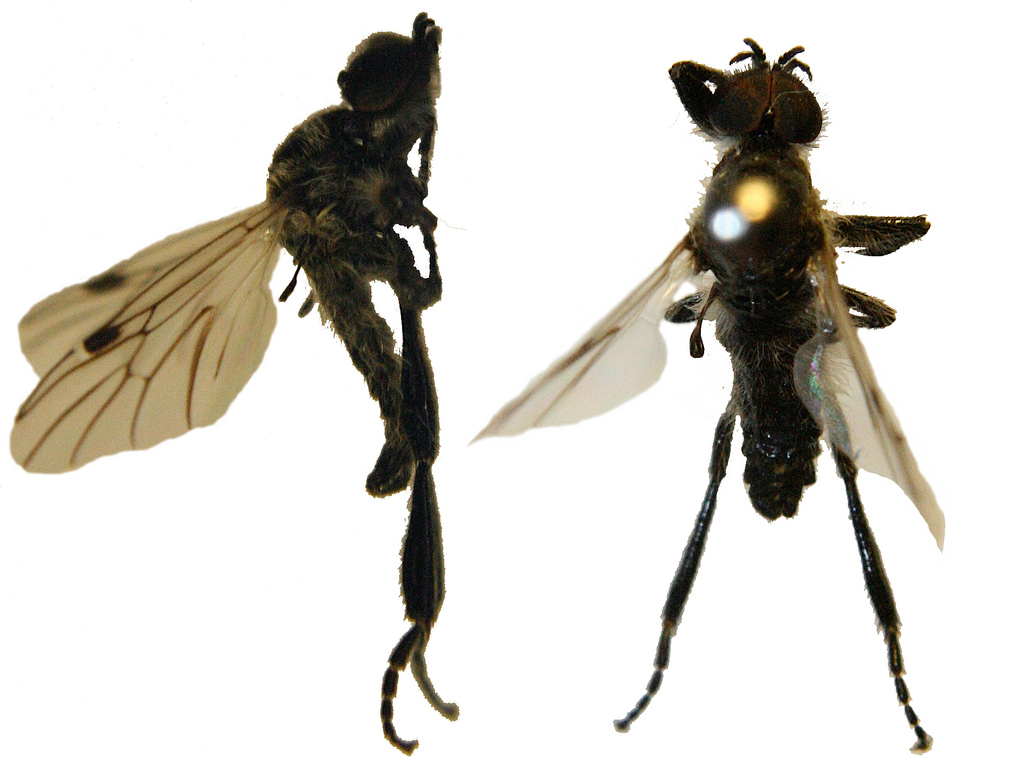

Scientific classification
- Kingdom: Animalia
- Phylum: Arthropoda
- Class: Insecta
- Order: Diptera
- Family: Bibionidae
- Genus: Bibio
- Species: B. nigriventris

Binomial name
- Bibio nigriventris Haliday, 1833

Synonyms
- Bibio lacteipennis Zetterstedt, 1850

= Bibio nigriventris =

Species of fly

Bibio nigriventris is a species of fly in the family Bibionidae. It is found in the Palearctic.
