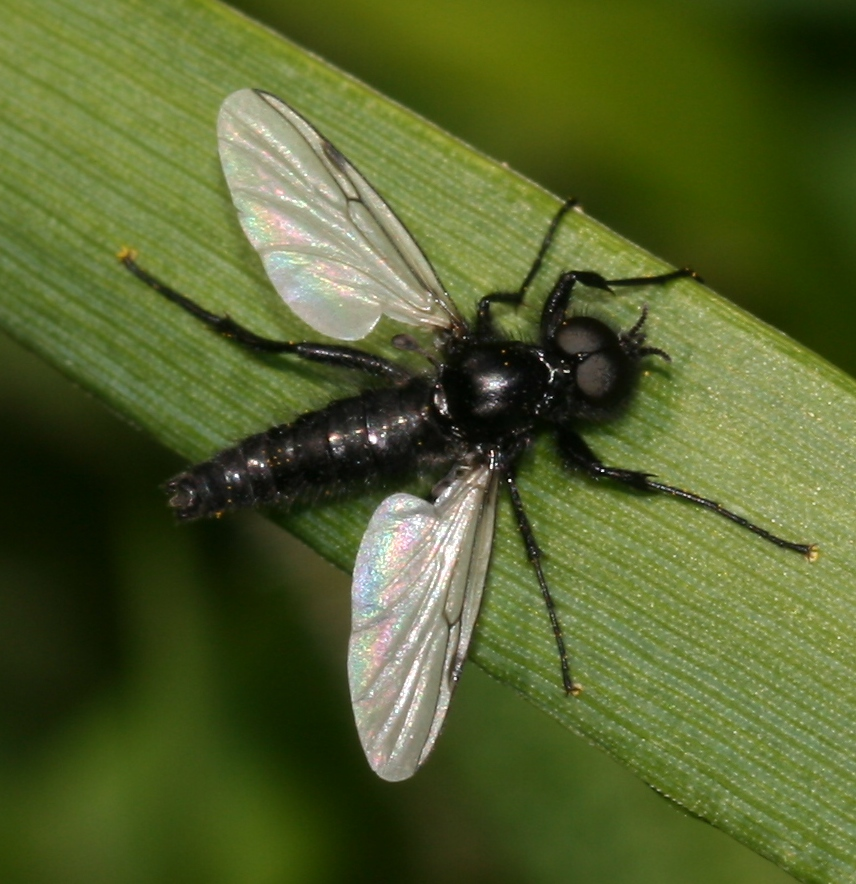

Scientific classification
- Kingdom: Animalia
- Phylum: Arthropoda
- Class: Insecta
- Order: Diptera
- Family: Bibionidae
- Genus: Bibio
- Species: B. leucopterus

Binomial name
- Bibio leucopterus (Meigen, 1804)

Synonyms
- Hirtea leucopterus Meigen, 1804

= Bibio leucopterus =

Species of fly

Bibio leucopterus is a species of fly in the family Bibionidae. It is found in the Palearctic.
