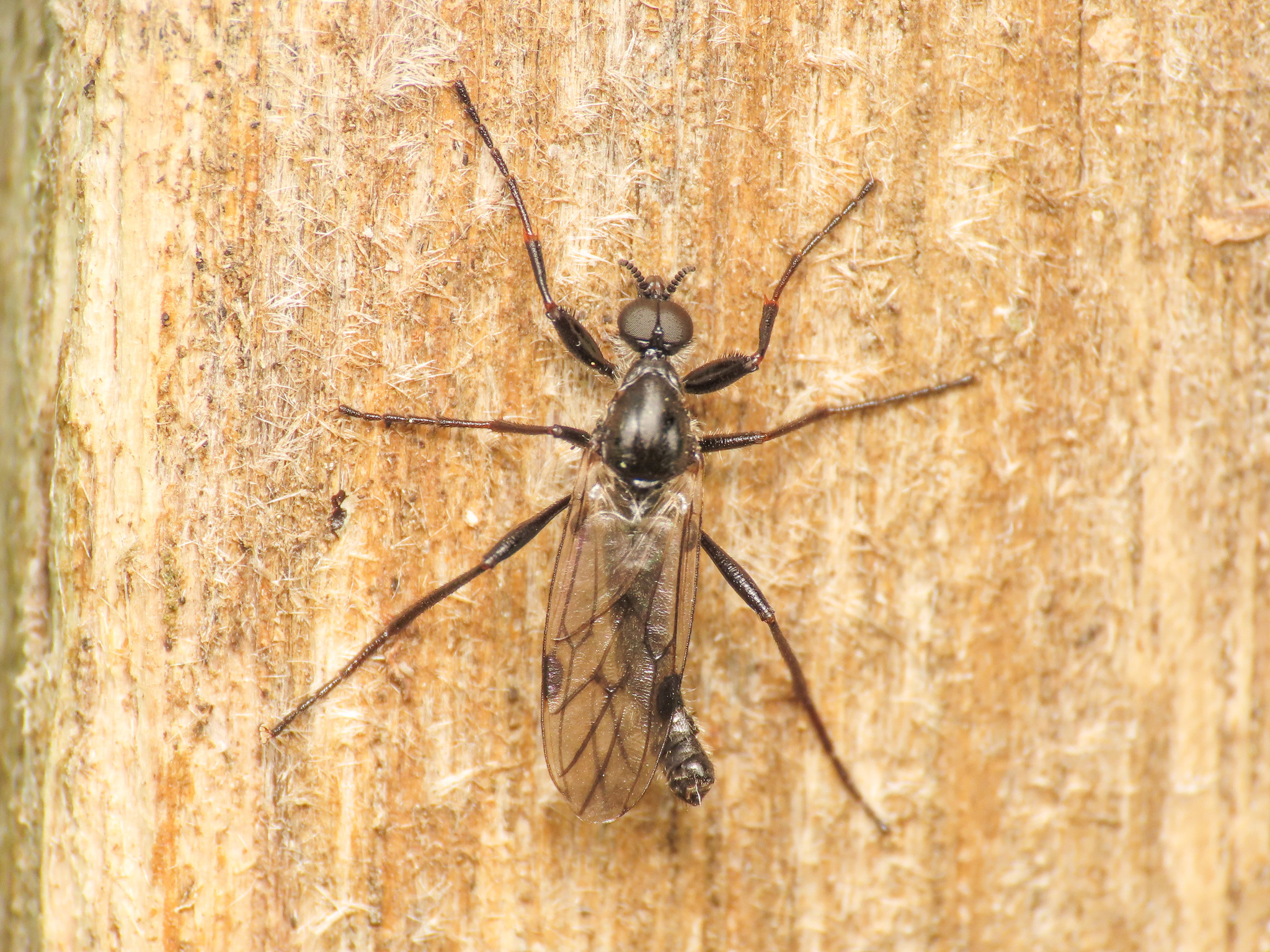

Scientific classification
- Kingdom: Animalia
- Phylum: Arthropoda
- Clade: Pancrustacea
- Class: Insecta
- Order: Diptera
- Family: Bibionidae
- Genus: Bibio
- Species: B. venosus

Binomial name
- Bibio venosus (Meigen, 1804)

Synonyms
- Hirtea venosus Meigen, 1804

= Bibio venosus =

Species of fly

Bibio venosus is a species of fly in the family Bibionidae. It is found in the Palearctic.
