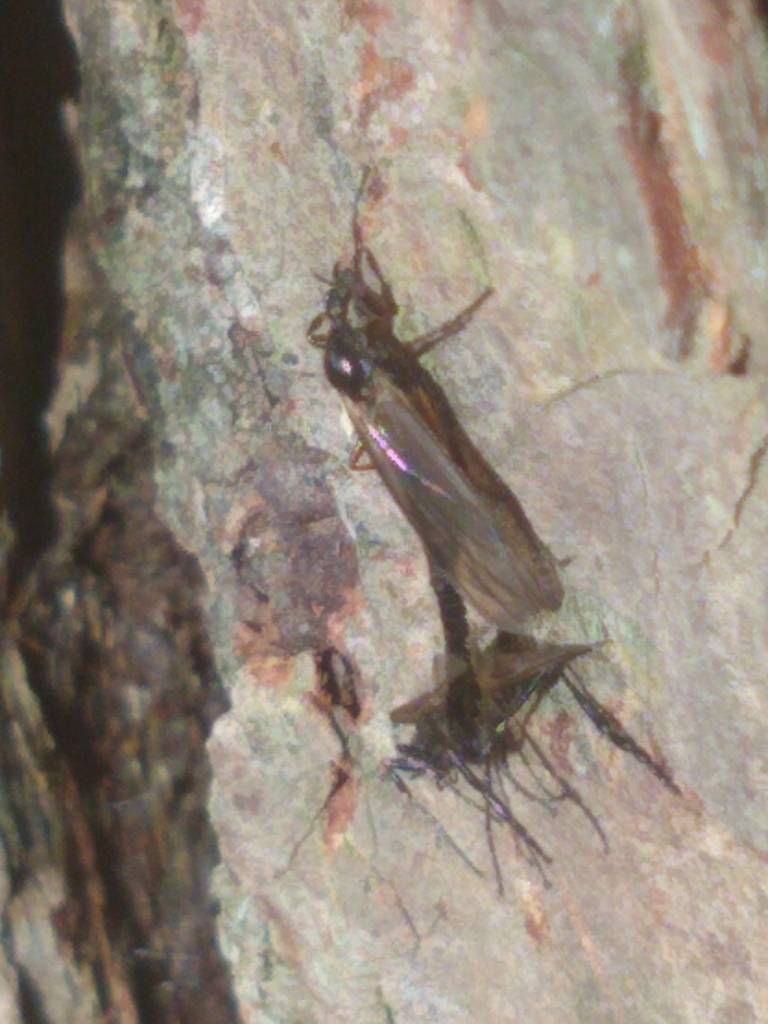

Scientific classification
- Kingdom: Animalia
- Phylum: Arthropoda
- Class: Insecta
- Order: Diptera
- Family: Bibionidae
- Genus: Bibio
- Species: B. slossonae

Binomial name
- Bibio slossonae (McLachlan, 1872)

= Bibio slossonae =

Species of fly

Bibio slossonae is a species of March fly in the family Bibionidae. Larvae are detritivores. Adults are pollinators of witch-hazel.
