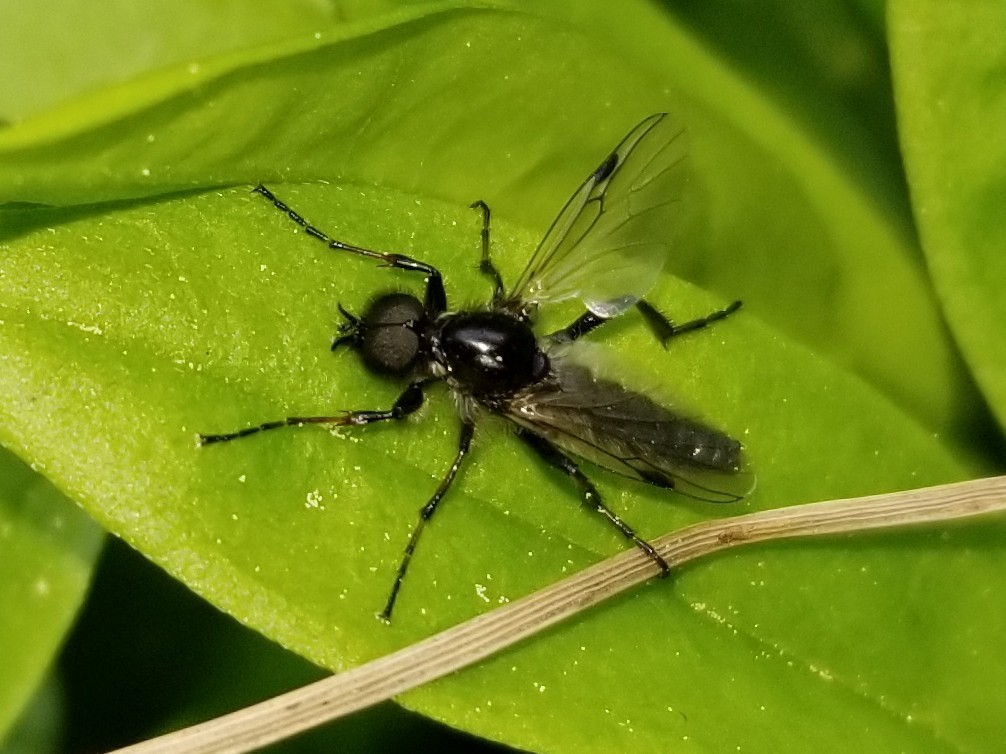

Scientific classification
- Kingdom: Animalia
- Phylum: Arthropoda
- Class: Insecta
- Order: Diptera
- Family: Bibionidae
- Genus: Bibio
- Species: B. vestitus

Binomial name
- Bibio vestitus Walker, 1848

Synonyms
- Bibio basalis Loew, 1864; Bibio nervosus Loew, 1864; Bibio variabilis Loew, 1864

= Bibio vestitus =

Species of fly

Bibio vestitus is a species of March fly in the family Bibionidae.
