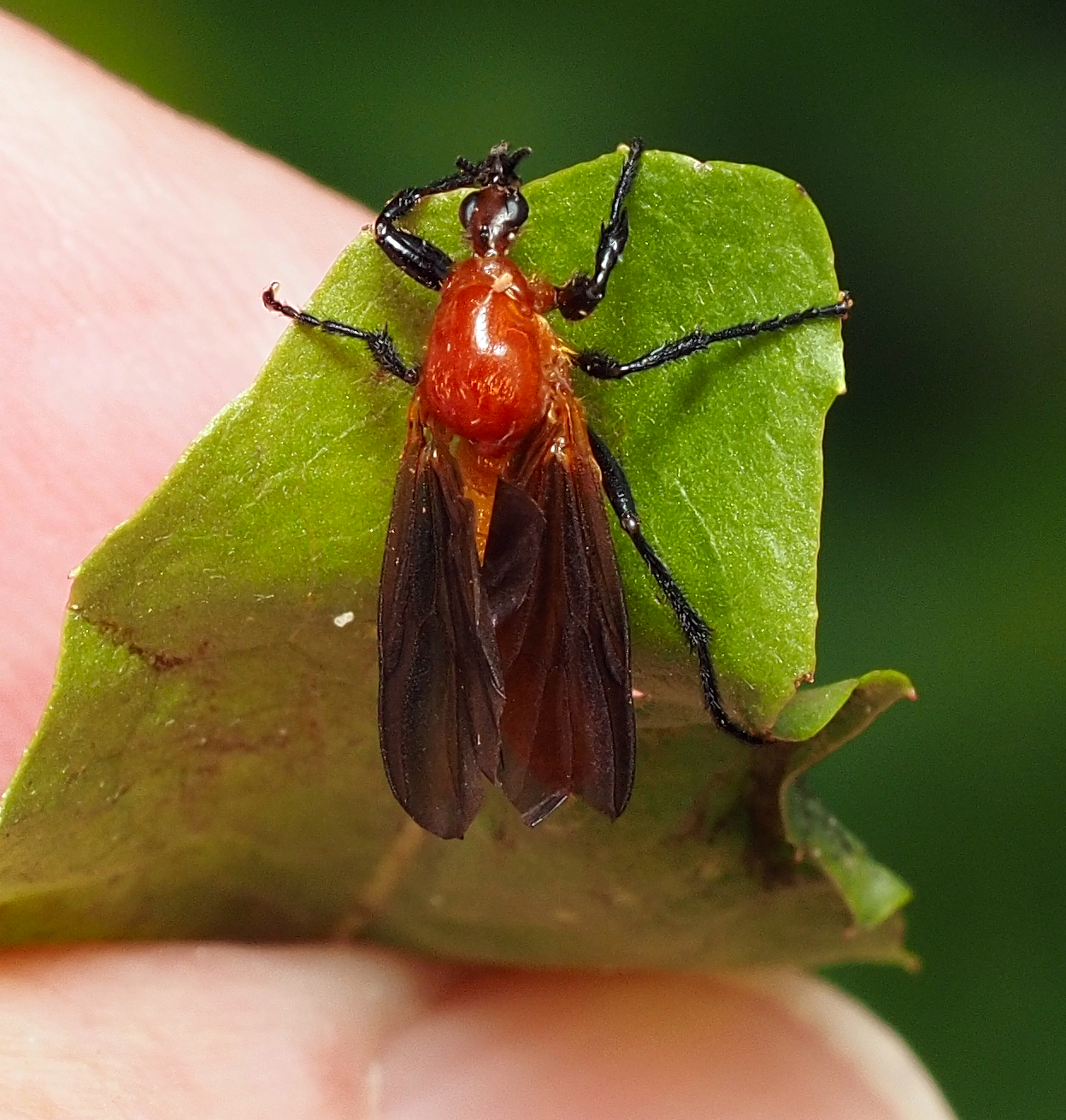

Scientific classification
- Domain: Eukaryota
- Kingdom: Animalia
- Phylum: Arthropoda
- Class: Insecta
- Order: Diptera
- Family: Bibionidae
- Genus: Bibio
- Species: B. imitator

Binomial name
- Bibio imitator Francis Walker 1835

= Bibio imitator =

Species of insect

Bibio imitator, common name garden maggot, is a species of fly from the genus Bibio, first described by Francis Walker in The Entomological Magazine vol 2, 1835. It occurs in Australia and New Zealand.

== Description ==
Grows to length of 6. 5–7. 5 mm, with wings measuring 6.5 mm. Has an all-black coloring, with brown smokey wings. Features a dense yellow pile on the body of the males. A rufous head, thorax, and abdomen. Dark reddish-brown to black legs (excluding the coxae) of the females
