= Bibio clavipes =

Scientific classification
- Kingdom: Animalia
- Phylum: Arthropoda
- Clade: Pancrustacea
- Class: Insecta
- Order: Diptera
- Family: Bibionidae
- Genus: Bibio
- Species: B. clavipes

Binomial name
- Bibio clavipes Meigen, 1818

Species of fly

Bibio clavipes is a species of fly from the family Bibionidae.
