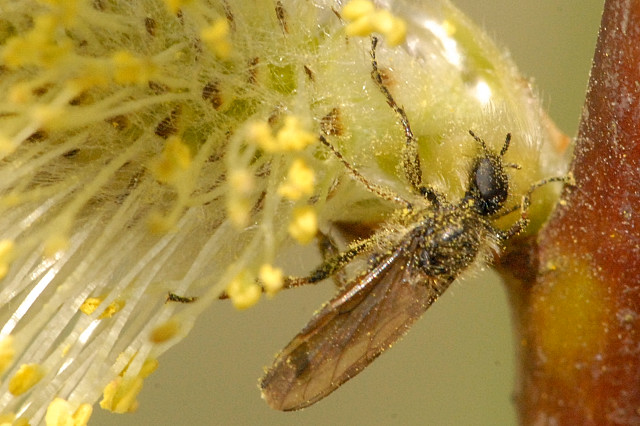

Scientific classification
- Kingdom: Animalia
- Phylum: Arthropoda
- Clade: Pancrustacea
- Class: Insecta
- Order: Diptera
- Family: Bibionidae
- Genus: Bibio
- Species: B. ferruginatus

Binomial name
- Bibio ferruginatus (Linnaeus, 1767)

Synonyms
- Tipula ferruginatus Linnaeus, 1767; nigripes Meigen, 1818

= Bibio ferruginatus =

Species of fly

Bibio ferruginatus is a species of fly from the family Bibionidae.
