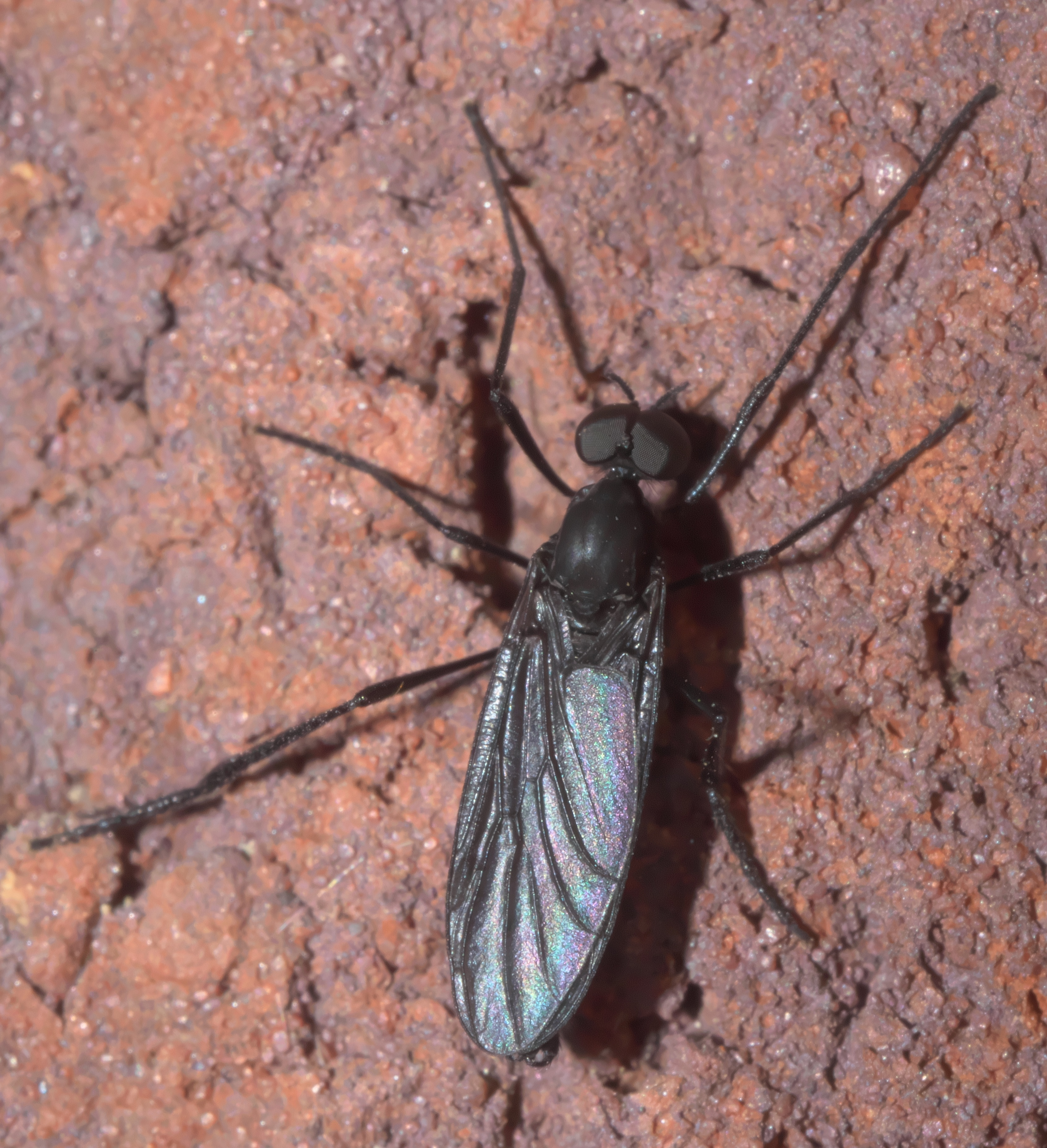

Scientific classification
- Kingdom: Animalia
- Phylum: Arthropoda
- Class: Insecta
- Order: Diptera
- Family: Bibionidae
- Genus: Penthetria
- Species: P. heteroptera

Binomial name
- Penthetria heteroptera (Say, 1823)

Synonyms
- Bibio heteroptera Say, 1823; Penthetria atra Macquart, 1834; Penthetria lugubris Harris, 1835; Plecia longipes Loew, 1858

= Penthetria heteroptera =

Species of fly

Penthetria heteroptera is a species of March fly in the family Bibionidae. It is widespread in the Americas and has been recorded in Europe.

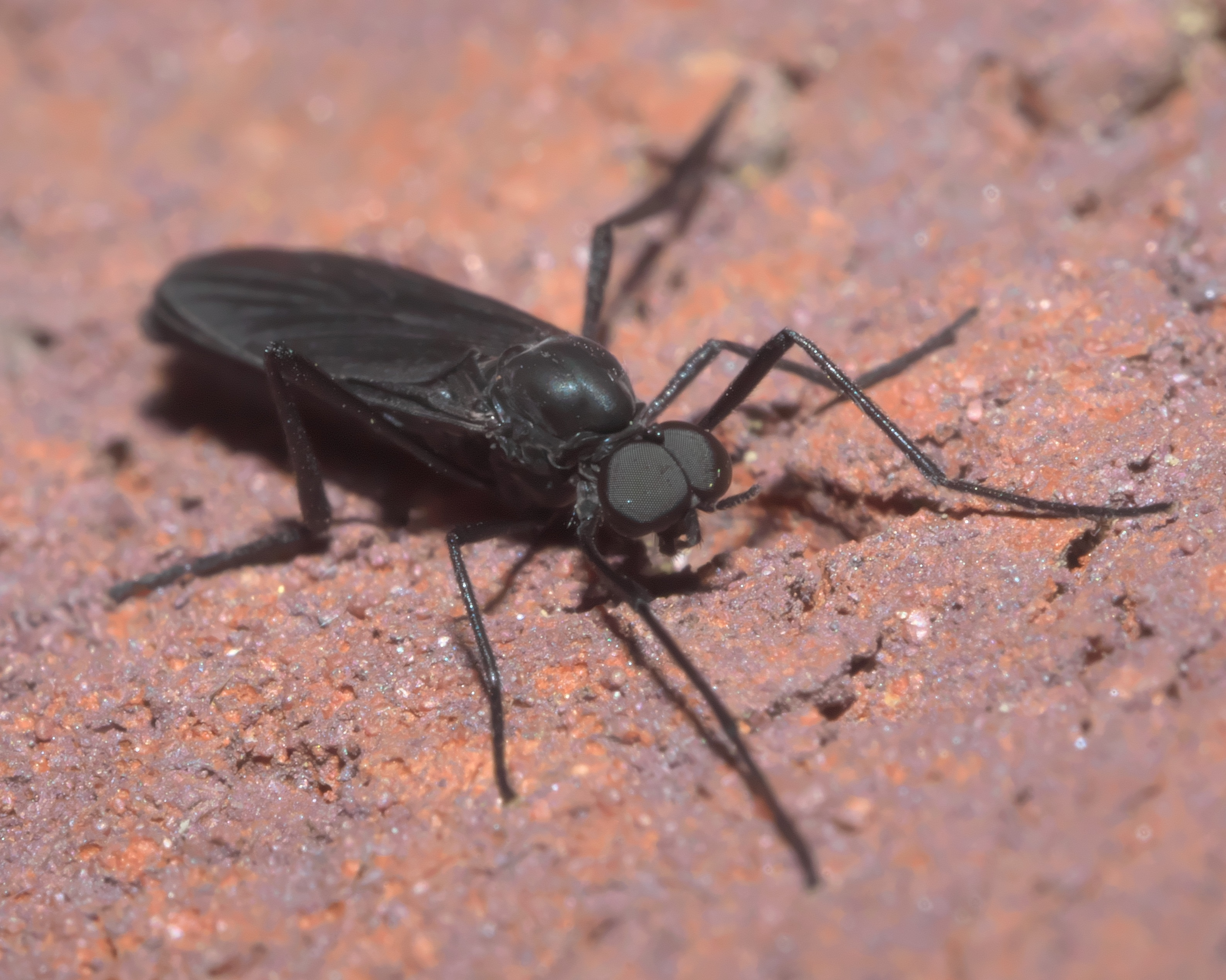
