= Bibio rufithorax =

Scientific classification
- Domain: Eukaryota
- Kingdom: Animalia
- Phylum: Arthropoda
- Class: Insecta
- Order: Diptera
- Family: Bibionidae
- Genus: Bibio
- Species: B. rufithorax

Binomial name
- Bibio rufithorax Wiedemann, 1828

Species of fly

Bibio rufithorax is a species of March fly in the family Bibionidae.
