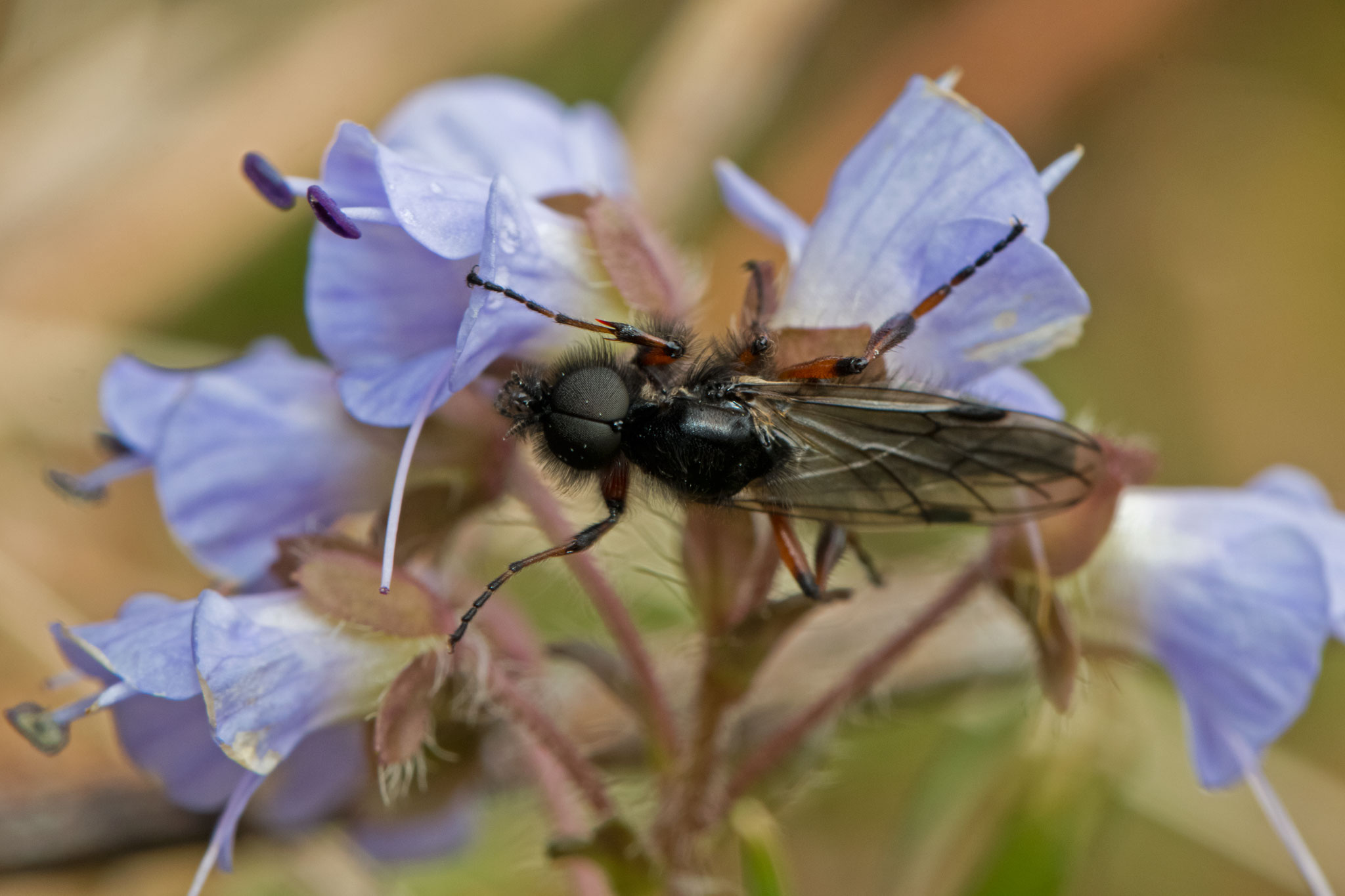
- B. xanthopus

Scientific classification
- Domain: Eukaryota
- Kingdom: Animalia
- Phylum: Arthropoda
- Class: Insecta
- Order: Diptera
- Family: Bibionidae
- Genus: Bibio
- Species: B. xanthopus

Binomial name
- Bibio xanthopus Wiedemann, 1828

= Bibio xanthopus =

Species of fly

Bibio xanthopus, or yellow-footed March fly, is a species of March fly (Bibionidae) first identified by Wiedemann in 1828. It is one of the most common species of Bibio in North America. The body is black with pale colored pile and legs that are predominantly rufous. Females have black wings. The size of the species varies considerably, with wingspans ranging from 5.5 to 9.5 mm and body lengths ranging from 8 to 11 mm. The maggots, which feed on roots, are 10 mm in length with warty skin and a pair of posterior spiracles.
