= Bibionellus =

Scientific classification
- Kingdom: Animalia
- Phylum: Arthropoda
- Class: Insecta
- Order: Diptera
- Family: Bibionidae
- Genus: Bibionellus; Edwards, 1935

Type species
- Bibionellus tibialis Edwards, 1935

Genus of flies

Bibionellus is a genus of March flies (Bibionidae).

== Species ==
- Bibionellus aczeli Hardy, 1953
- Bibionellus barrettoi Lane & Forattini, 1948
- Bibionellus halteralis (Coquillett, 1904)
- Bibionellus paulistensis Lane & Forattini, 1948
- Bibionellus tibialis Edwards, 1935
