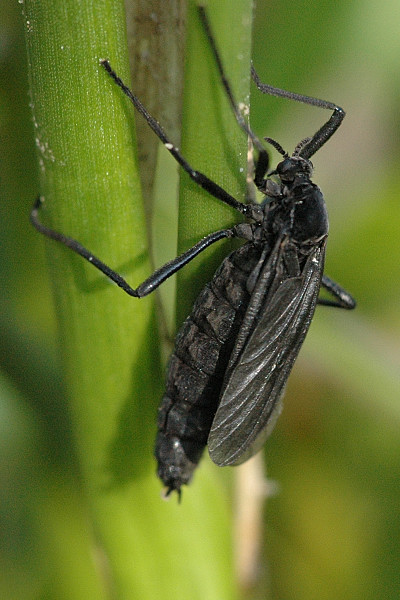
- P. funebris

Scientific classification
- Domain: Eukaryota
- Kingdom: Animalia
- Phylum: Arthropoda
- Class: Insecta
- Order: Diptera
- Family: Bibionidae
- Genus: Penthetria; Meigen, 1803

Type species
- Penthetria funebris Meigen, 1804

Synonyms
- Amasia Meigen, 1800

= Penthetria =

Genus of flies

Penthetria is a genus of March flies (Bibionidae).

== Species ==
- P. aberrans Yang & Luo, 1989
- P. appendicula Hardy, 1945
- P. beijingensis Yang & Luo, 1988
- P. carbonaria (Brunetti, 1912)
- P. clavata Yang & Luo, 1989
- P. distincta Hardy, 1945
- P. erythrosticta Yang & Luo, 1989
- P. formosana Hardy, 1953
- P. funebris Meigen, 1804
- P. gansuensis Yang & Luo, 1989
- P. gracilima Edwards, 1928
- P. heros Say, 1829
- P. heteroptera (Say, 1823)
- P. indica (Brunetti, 1911)
- P. integroneura Skartveit, 2009
- P. japonica Wiedemann, 1830
- P. melanaspis Wiedemann, 1828
- P. mexicana (Hardy, 1937)
- P. montanaregis Skartveit, 2009
- P. motschulskii (Gimmerthal, 1845)
- P. nigerrima (Bellardi, 1859)
- P. nigrita Perty, 1833
- P. obscura (Brunetti, 1911)
- P. picea Yang, 1997
- P. ritsumeikana Sasakawa, 1967
- P. rufidorsalis Luo & Yang, 1988
- P. shaanxiensis Yang & Luo, 1989
- P. simplicipes (Brunetti, 1925)
- P. takeuchii Okada, 1938
- P. velutina Loew, 1858
- P. yunnanica Luo & Yang, 1988
- P. zheana Yang & Chen, 1995
