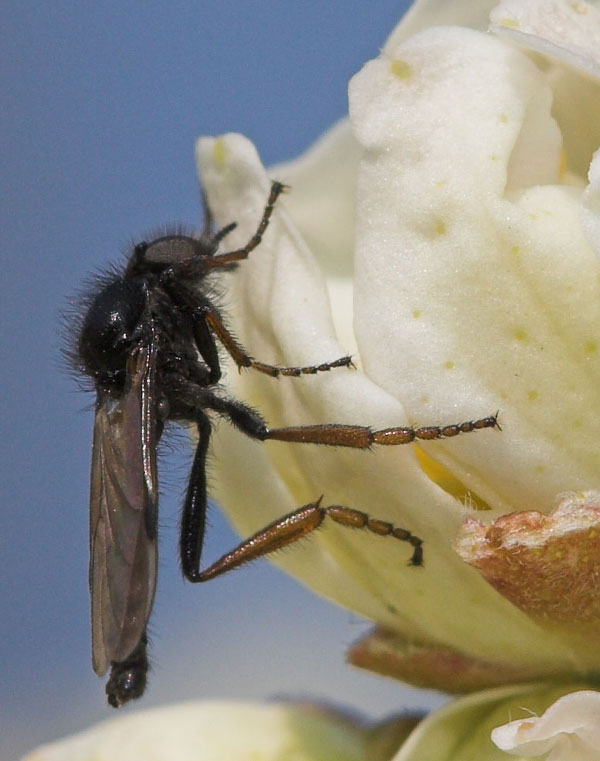

Scientific classification
- Kingdom: Animalia
- Phylum: Arthropoda
- Class: Insecta
- Order: Diptera
- Family: Bibionidae
- Genus: Bibio
- Species: B. johannis

Binomial name
- Bibio johannis (Linnaeus, 1767)

Synonyms
- Tipula johannis Linnaeus, 1767

= Bibio johannis =

Species of fly

Bibio johannis is a species of fly in the family Bibionidae. It is found in the Palearctic.
