= Enicoscolus =

Scientific classification
- Kingdom: Animalia
- Phylum: Arthropoda
- Class: Insecta
- Order: Diptera
- Family: Bibionidae
- Genus: Enicoscolus; Hardy, 1961

Type species
- Enicoscolus dolichocephalus Hardy, 1961

Genus of flies

Enicoscolus is a genus of March flies (Bibionidae).

== Species ==
- Enicoscolus brachycephalus Hardy, 1961
- Enicoscolus collessi Hardy, 1962
- Enicoscolus dolichocephalus Hardy, 1961
- Enicoscolus hardyi Fitzgerald, 1997
