= Bibiodes =

Scientific classification
- Domain: Eukaryota
- Kingdom: Animalia
- Phylum: Arthropoda
- Class: Insecta
- Order: Diptera
- Family: Bibionidae
- Genus: Bibiodes; Coquillett, 1904

Type species
- Bibiodes halteralis Coquillett, 1904

Genus of flies

Bibiodes is a genus of March flies (Bibionidae).

== Species ==
- B. aestivus Melander, 1912
- †B. balticus Skartveit, 2009
- B. femoratus Melander, 1912
- B. halteralis Coquillett, 1904
- †B. intermedia James, 1937
- †B. nanus Skartveit, 2009
- B. provincialis Skartveit & Nel, 2017
- B. sinensis Yang & Luo, 1987
