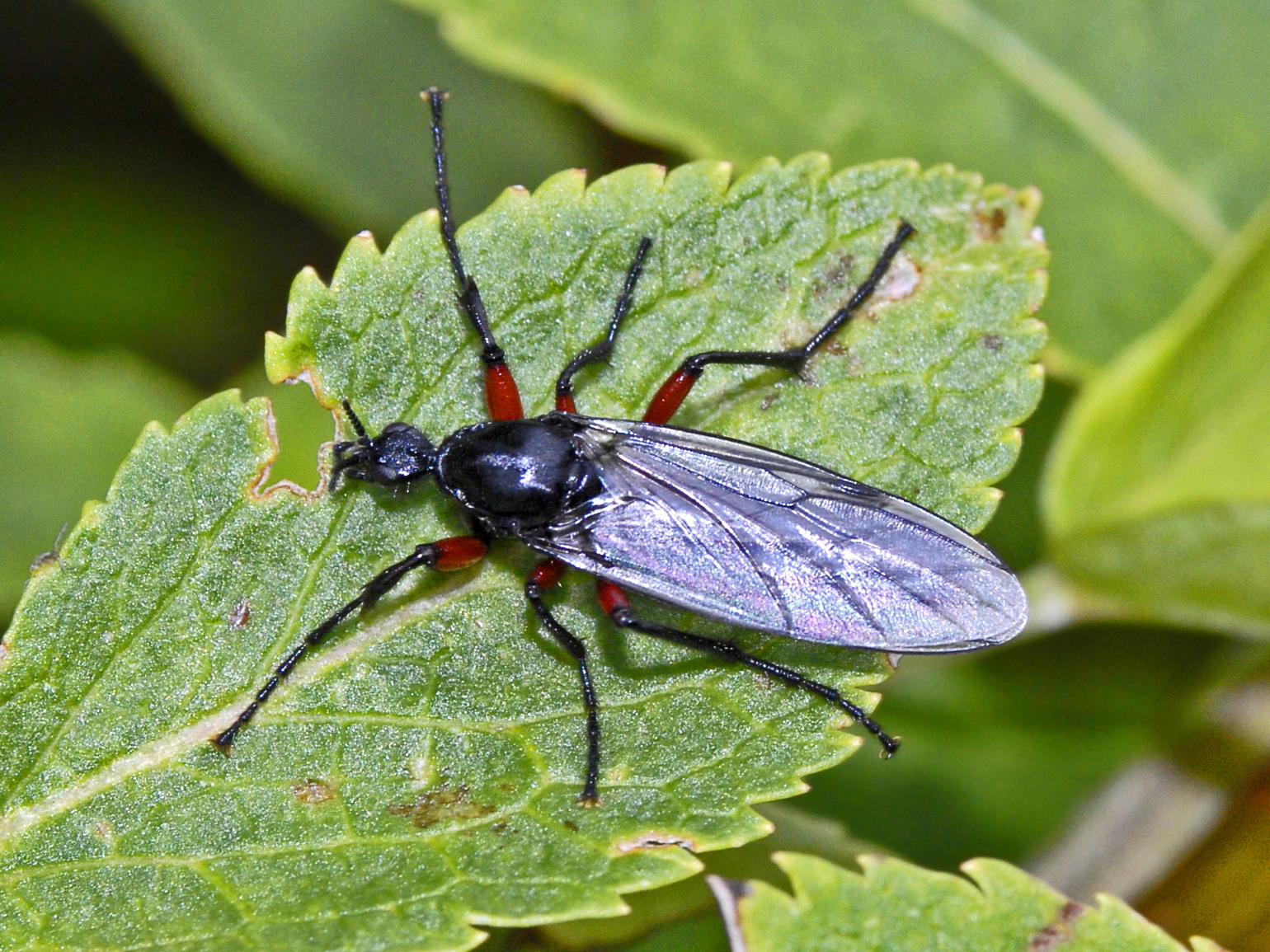
- Bibio pomonae, female
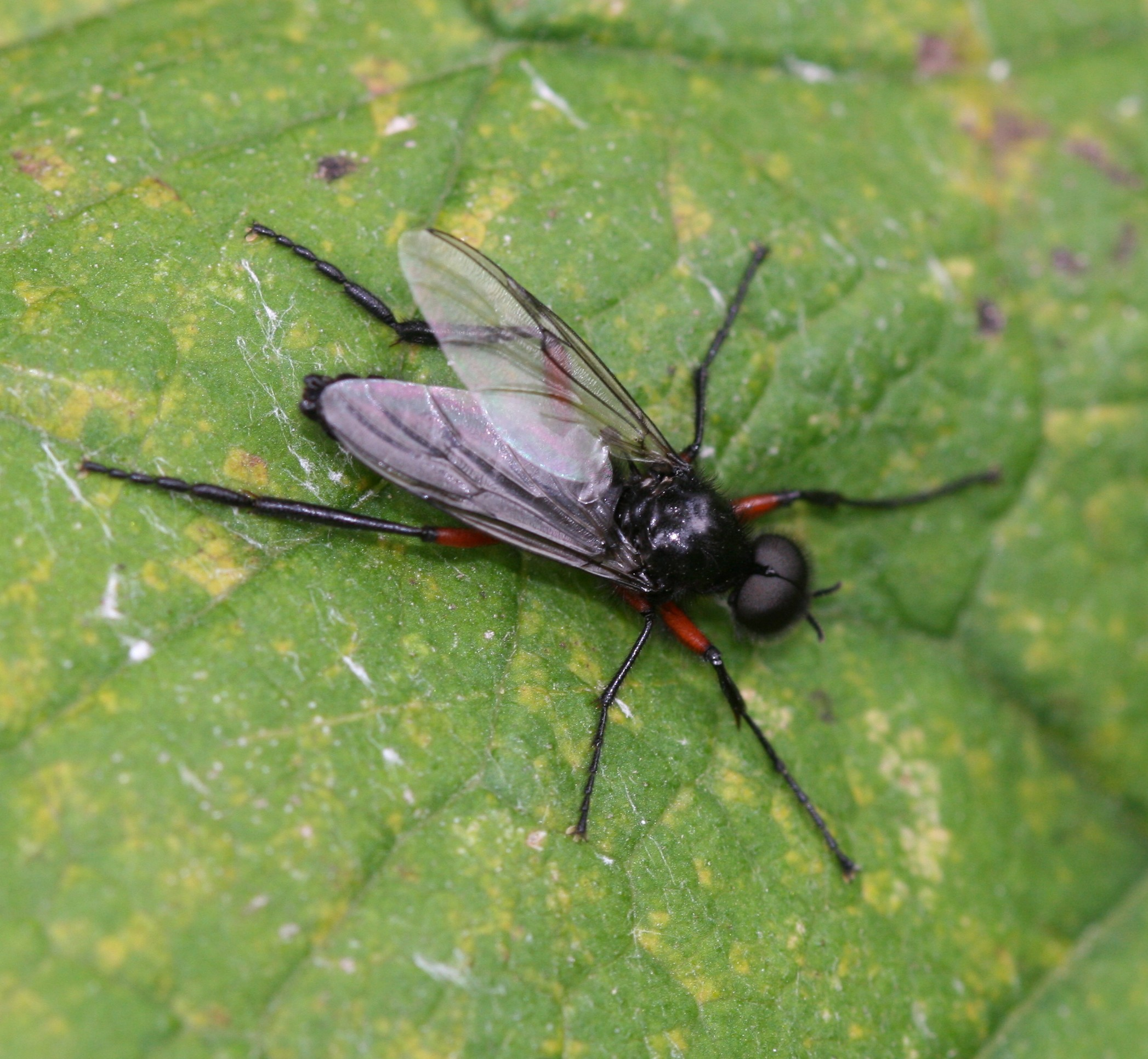
- Bibio pomonae, male

Scientific classification
- Domain: Eukaryota
- Kingdom: Animalia
- Phylum: Arthropoda
- Class: Insecta
- Order: Diptera
- Family: Bibionidae
- Genus: Bibio
- Species: B. pomonae

Binomial name
- Bibio pomonae (Fabricius, 1775)

Synonyms
- Pullata funestus Harris, 1776; Tipula funestus Harris, 1776; Tipula marcifulvipes De Geer, 1776; Tipula pomonae Fabricius, 1775

= Bibio pomonae =

Species of fly

Bibio pomonae, common name red-thighed St Mark's fly or heather fly, is a species of fly (Diptera) belonging to the family Bibionidae.

== Description ==
Bibio pomonae can reach a length of about 10–13 millimetres (0.39–0.51 in), while the length of the wings reaches 8–12 millimetres (0.31–0.47 in). The basic body color is shiny black, with a black long abdomen, deep crimson-red femurs and dark tibiae and tarsi. Front tibia show a pair of large spurs. Wings are milky-white with darkened veins on the costal area and a dark spot on the leading edge. The 10-segmented antennae are relatively short and thick. Males and females are very different, as the holoptic males show very large eyes and a flattened abdomen, while the females have small head and eyes and a sharp abdomen. The larvae are reddish brown.

== Biology ==
Adults feed mostly on nectar and are important pollinators. Larvae develop during Fall and Winter feeding on dead leaves, compost, decaying organic matter and Poaceae roots

Adults are late summer flyers, but they occur from May to October. In Norway's Hardangarvidda it has been observed that they appear in large numbers every third year, which suggests the larvae take three years to develop.

== Distribution ==
This species can be found across most of the Palearctic realm (Europe and North Asia), but in southern Europe can be found only in the mountains.

== Habitat ==
This fly occurs in hedge rows of hill countries, on moorland and mountain birch forests, in woodland edges, fields and in wetlands.
