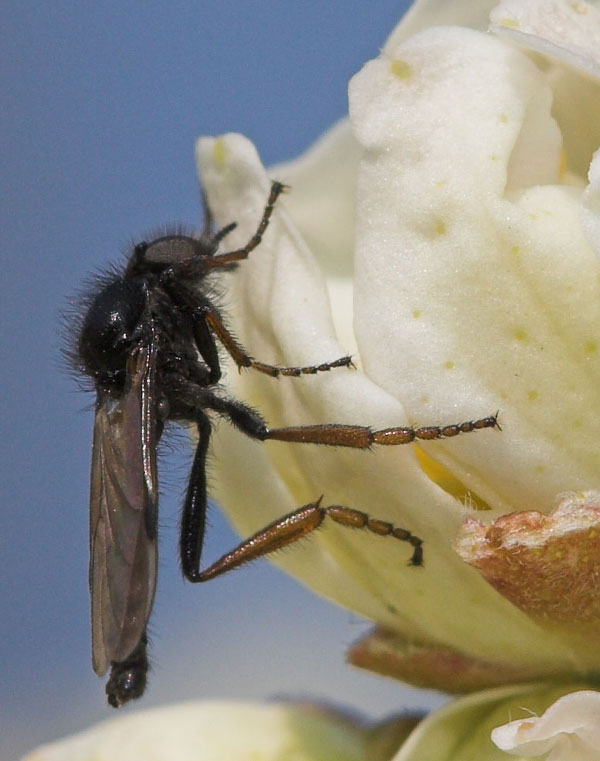
- Bibio johannis

Scientific classification
- Kingdom: Animalia
- Phylum: Arthropoda
- Class: Insecta
- Order: Diptera
- Family: Bibionidae
- Genus: Bibio; Geoffroy, 1762

Type species
- Tipula hortulanus Linnaeus, 1758

Species
- see text

Synonyms
- Bibionus Rafinesque, 1815; Bibiophus Bollow, 1954; Dichaneurum Aymard, 1856; Hirtea Fabricius, 1798; Lithobibio Beier, 1952; Pullata Harris, 1776

= Bibio (fly) =

Genus of flies

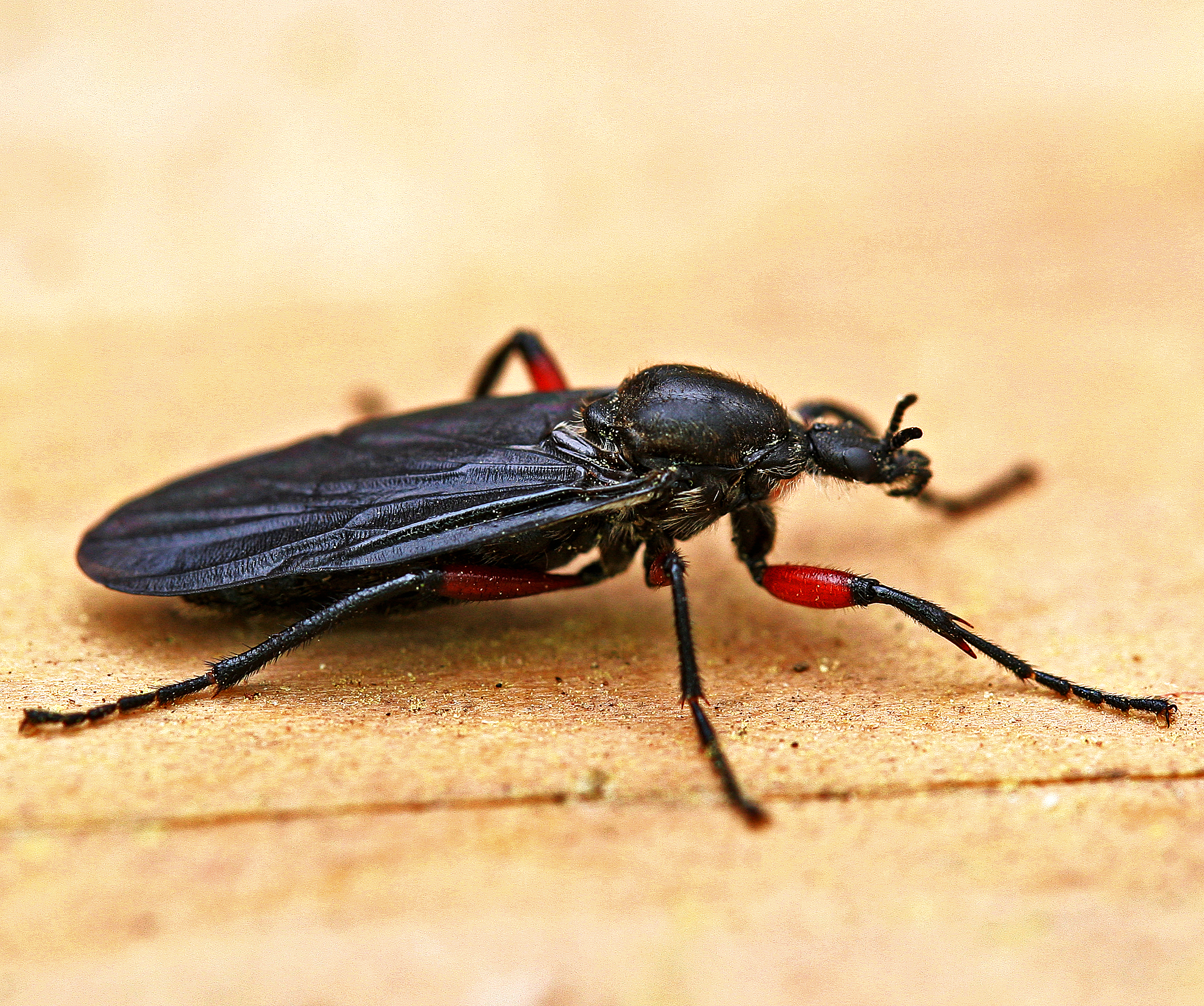
Bibio femoratus - March Fly

Bibio, March flies or St. Mark's flies, is a genus of flies (Diptera).

== Biology ==
Bibio larvae live in grassy areas and are herbivores and scavengers feeding on dead vegetation or living plant roots. Some species are found in compost.

In some areas, Bibio flies are regular flower visitors and they are suggested to be pollinators of several plant species, such as hogweed (Heracleum sphondylium) and mouse-ear hawkweed (Hieracium pilosella).

Bibio flies also show strong sexual dichotomy, with males and females having significant differences in body morphology.

== Species ==
- B. abbreviatus Loew, 1864
- B. acaptus Durrenfeldt, 1968
- B. acerbus Yang & Luo, 1989
- B. acutifidis Yang & Luo, 1989
- B. albagulus Durrenfeldt, 1968
- B. albipennis Say, 1823
- B. alexanderi James, 1936
- B. alienus McAtee, 1923
- B. anasiformis Durrenfeldt, 1968
- B. anglicus Verrall, 1869
- B. anposis Hardy, 1968
- B. articulatus Say, 1823
- B. atrigigas Fitzgerald, 1997
- B. atripilosa James, 1936
- B. baltimoricus Macquart, 1855
- B. basalis Loew, 1864
- B. biconcavus Yang & Luo, 1989
- B. borisi Fitzgerald, 1997
- B. brunnipes (Fabricius, 1794)
- B. bryanti Johnson, 1929
- B. carnificus Durrenfeldt, 1968
- B. carolinus Hardy, 1945
- B. carri Curran, 1927
- B. castanipes Jaennicke, 1867
- B. chelostylus Fitzgerald, 1997
- B. chiapensis Fitzgerald, 1997
- B. claviantenna Yang & Luo, 1989
- B. clavipes Meigen, 1818
- B. cognatus Hardy, 1937
- B. columbiaensis Hardy, 1938
- B. constringutus Durrenfeldt, 1968
- B. contererus Durrenfeldt, 1968
- B. crassinodus Yang & Luo, 1989
- B. cruciformis Durrenfeldt, 1968
- B. cuneatus Yang & Luo, 1989
- B. curtipes James, 1936
- B. deflectus Durrenfeldt, 1968
- B. dipetalus Yang & Luo, 1989
- B. discerptus Durrenfeldt, 1968
- B. dolichotarsus Yang, 1997
- B. dormitus Durrenfeldt, 1968
- B. echinulatus Yang & Luo, 1989
- B. elmoi Papp, 1982
- B. emphysetarsus Yang, 1997
- B. enormus Durrenfeldt, 1968
- B. femoralis Meigen, 1838
- B. femoraspinatus Yang, 1997
- B. femoratus Wiedemann, 1820
- B. ferruginatus (Linnaeus, 1767)
- B. flavissimus Brunetti, 1925
- B. fluginata Hardy, 1937
- B. flukei Hardy, 1937
- B. fraternus Loew, 1864
- B. fulvicollis Gimmerthal, 1842
- B. fumipennis Walker, 1848
- B. gineri Gil Collado, 1932
- B. graecus Duda, 1930
- B. handlirschi Duda, 1930
- B. hirtus Loew, 1864
- B. holtii McAtee, 1922
- B. hortulanus (Linnaeus, 1758)
- B. illaudatus Hardy, 1961
- B. imitator Walker, 1835
- B. imparilis Hardy, 1959
- B. inacqualis Loew, 1864
- B. johannis (Linnaeus, 1767)
- B. kansensis James, 1936
- B. knowltoni Hardy, 1937
- B. labradorensis Johnson, 1929
- B. lanigerus Meigen, 1818
- B. latiantennatus Durrenfeldt, 1968
- B. laufferi Strobl, 1906
- B. lautaretensis Villeneuve, 1925
- B. lepidus Loew, 1871
- B. leucopterus (Meigen, 1804)
- B. lobata Hardy, 1937
- B. longipes Loew, 1864
- B. lugens Loew, 1864
- B. macer Loew, 1871
- B. marci (Linnaeus, 1758)
- B. medioalbus Durrenfeldt, 1968
- B. melanopilosus Hardy, 1936
- B. mickeli Hardy, 1937
- B. monstri James, 1936
- B. nebulosus Durrenfeldt, 1968
- B. necotus Hardy, 1937
- B. nervosus Loew, 1864
- B. nigrifemoratus Hardy, 1937
- B. nigripilus Loew, 1864
- B. nigripilus Loew, 1864
- B. nigriventris Haliday, 1833
- B. obediens Osten Sacken, 1881
- B. obscurus Loew, 1864
- B. painteri James, 1936
- B. pallipes Say, 1823
- B. picinitarsis Brulle, 1832
- B. pingreensis James, 1936
- B. plecioides Osten Sacken, 1881
- B. pomonae (Fabricius, 1775)
- B. praecidus Durrenfeldt, 1968
- B. reticulatus Loew, 1846
- B. rufalipes Hardy, 1937
- B. rufipes (Zetterstedt, 1838)
- B. rufithorax Wiedemann, 1828
- B. rufitibialis Hardy, 1938
- B. sericata Hardy, 1937
- B. shaanxiensis Yang & Luo, 1989
- B. siculus Loew, 1846
- B. siebkei Mik, 1887
- B. sierrae Hardy, 1960
- B. similis Durrenfeldt, 1968
- B. similis James, 1936
- B. slossonae Cockerell, 1909
- B. soldatus Durrenfeldt, 1968
- B. striatipes Walker, 1848
- B. tenebrosus Coquillett, 1898
- B. tenella Hardy, 1937
- B. tenuis Durrenfeldt, 1968
- B. thoracicus Say, 1824
- B. townesi Hardy, 1945
- B. tripus Durrenfeldt, 1968
- B. tristis Williston, 1893
- B. utahensis Hardy, 1937
- B. variabilis Loew, 1864
- B. variicolor Yang & Luo, 1989
- B. varipes Meigen, 1830
- B. velcida Hardy, 1937
- B. velorum McAtee, 1923
- B. venosus (Meigen, 1804)
- B. vestitus Walker, 1848
- B. villosus Meigen, 1818
- B. vixdus Durrenfeldt, 1968
- B. xanthopus Wiedemann, 1828
- B. xuthopteron Hardy, 1968
