= Polyanthos =

Polyanthos may refer to:

- Polyanthos (magazine), published in Boston by Joseph Tinker Buckingham
- A newspaper published in New York by George Washington Dixon

== See also ==
- Polyanthus (disambiguation)
