= Polyanthus =

Polyanthus may refer to:

- HMS Polyanthus (K47), a warship
- A locomotive of the GWR 4100 Class
- Cultivars of the hybrid species Primula × polyantha
- A horse in the 1836 Grand Liverpool Steeplechase
- A synonym of the plant genus Pleioblastus.

== See also ==
- Polyanthos (disambiguation)
