= Dichoptic =

Dichoptic may refer to:

- Dichoptic arrangement, distribution of eyes that are laterally paired eyes and separately situated, in the morphology of animals such as vertebrates and most Arthropoda
- Dichoptic presentation is the presentation of independent, rather than coordinated, visual stimuli to an organism's two eyes
