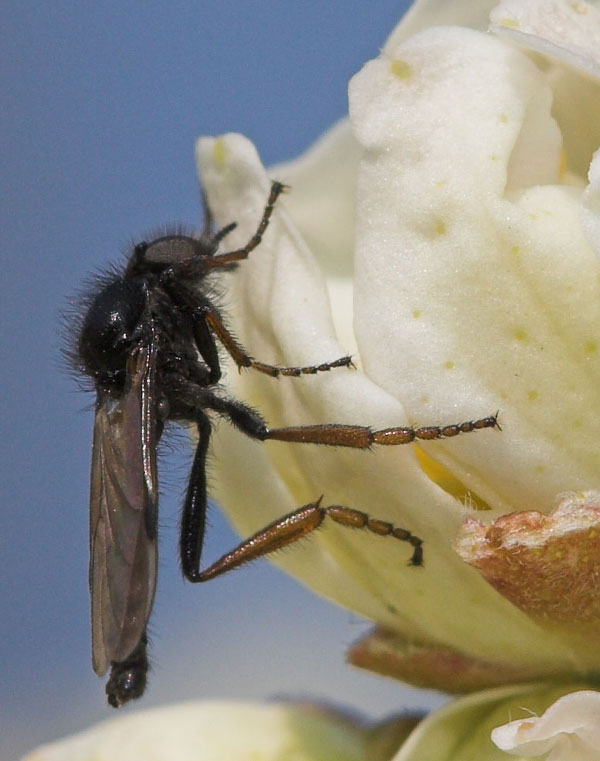
- Bibio johannis

Scientific classification
- Kingdom: Animalia
- Phylum: Arthropoda
- Clade: Pancrustacea
- Class: Insecta
- Order: Diptera
- Suborder: Nematocera
- Infraorder: Bibionomorpha
- Superfamily: Bibionoidea
- Family: Bibionidae; Fleming, 1821

Genera
- See text

Synonyms
- Cascopleciidae

= Bibionidae =

Family of flies

Bibionidae (March flies) is a family of flies (Diptera) containing approximately 650–700 species worldwide. Adults are nectar feeders and emerge in numbers in spring. Because of the likelihood of adult flies being found in copula, they have earned colloquial names such as "love bugs" or "honeymoon flies".

== Description ==
Bibionidae are medium-sized flies with a body length from 4.0 to 10.0 mm. The body is black, brown, or rusty, and thickset, with thick legs. The antennae are moniliform. The front tibiae bear large strong spurs or a circlet of spines. The tarsi are five-segmented and bear tarsal claws, pulvilli, and a well developed empodium. The wings have two basal cells (posterior basal wing cell and basal wing cell), but are without a discoidal wing cell. R4+5 is simple or branched; at most, only three branches of R developed. The leading edge wing veins are stronger than the weak veins of the trailing edge.

Bibionidae wing veins

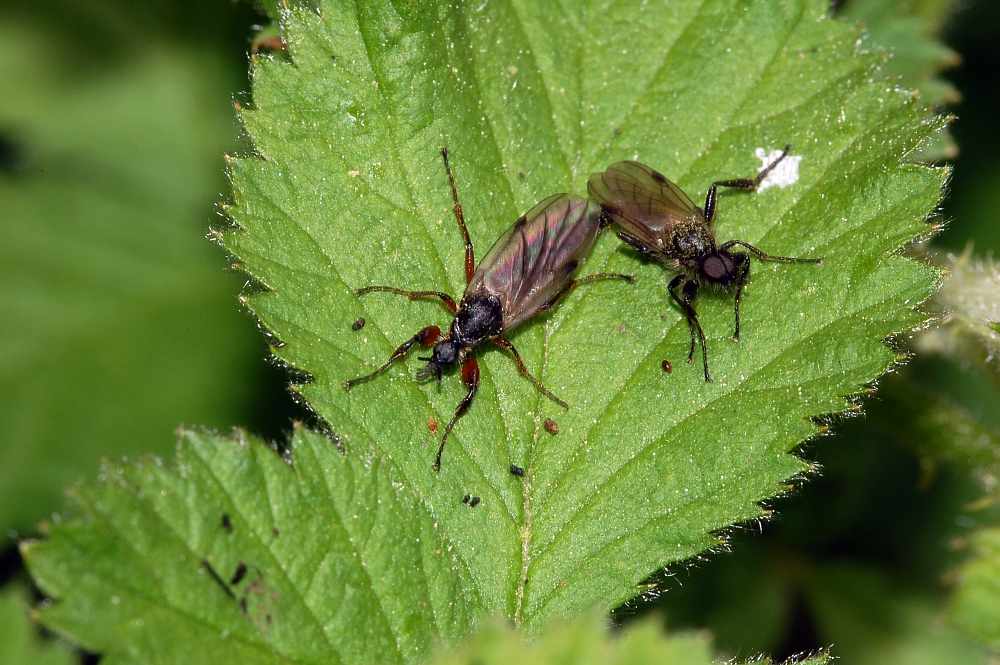
Bibio reticulatus: Note the dichoptic female. The male is holoptic.

== Biology ==
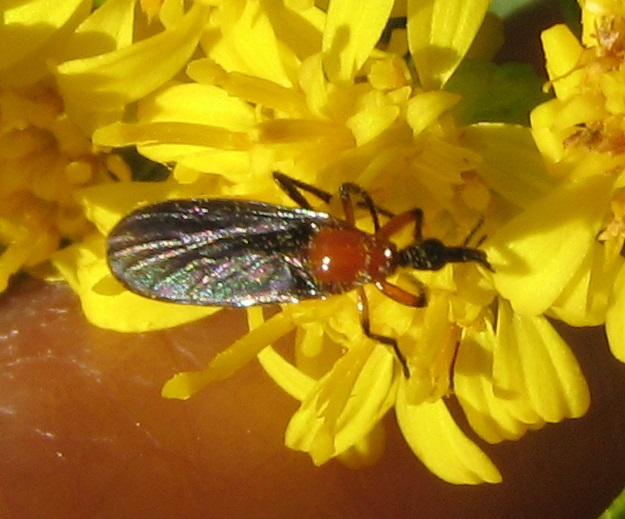
Dilophus, female

Bibionid larvae grow up in grassy areas and are herbivores and scavengers feeding on dead vegetation or living plant roots. Some species are found in compost. Larvae are sometimes found in pockets in which sometimes up to 200 specimens have been counted. Adults of most Plecia and some species of Bibio do not eat, but subsist solely on the food taken in during the larval stage and drop steadily when in flight until they are a few inches above the ground, hovering slowly. Adult-stage bibionids are quite short-lived, and some species of Plecia (lovebugs) spend much of their adult lives copulating. The male and female (lovebugs) attach themselves at the rear of the abdomen and remain that way at all times, even in flight. Adults swarm after synchronous emergence, sometimes in enormous numbers.

== Fossil record ==
Bibionids have the most extensive fossil record of any dipteran family. Fossil bibionids are known questionably from the Jurassic, while some forms from the early part of the Upper Cretaceous look quite similar to modern species. Bibionid flies are very abundant among insect fossils from the Tertiary period, and many species have been described, although often based on highly fragmentary material. Most fossil species are easily identified with extant genera. In particular, the genera Plecia and Bibio are abundant among Tertiary fossils. Fossils from Europe include many specimens of the mainly tropical genus Plecia which is today entirely absent from Europe, demonstrating a warmer climate during the Tertiary.

== Genera ==
- Bibio Geoffroy, 1762
- Bibiodes Coquillett, 1904
- Bibionellus Edwards, 1935
- †Cascoplecia Poinar, 2010
- †Clothonopsis Hong & Wang, 1987 (dubious taxon)
- Dilophus Meigen, 1803
- Enicoscolus Hardy, 1968
- †Fushunoplecia Hong, 2002
- †Lithosomyia Carpenter, 1986
- †Mesopleciella Rohdendorf, 1946
- Penthetria Meigen, 1803
- Plecia Wiedemann, 1828

The genera Penthetria and Plecia were sometimes placed in a separate family Pleciidae but no support for this has been found in molecular phylogenetic studies.

== Economic importance ==
For those species where the adults feed, they do so on the nectar of flowers of fruit trees and especially on flowers of umbelliferous plants, often swarming in mass flights in spring. Adults are important pollinators. Larvae play an important role in formation and accumulation of humus in soil. Some larvae are plant pests, especially of pasture land and agronomic crops including cereal crops, vegetables, forage crops, and seedlings of many other plants.

== Images ==
- Diptera.info
- BugGuide
