= Entomophily =

Form of pollination by insects

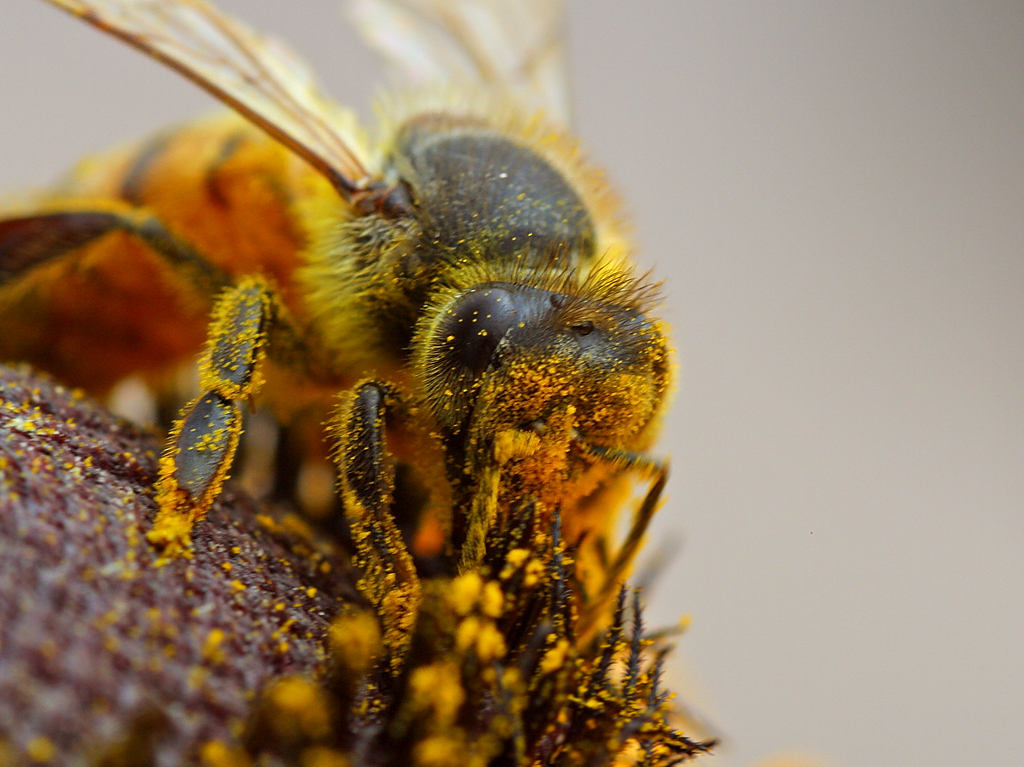
Bee pollinating a flower

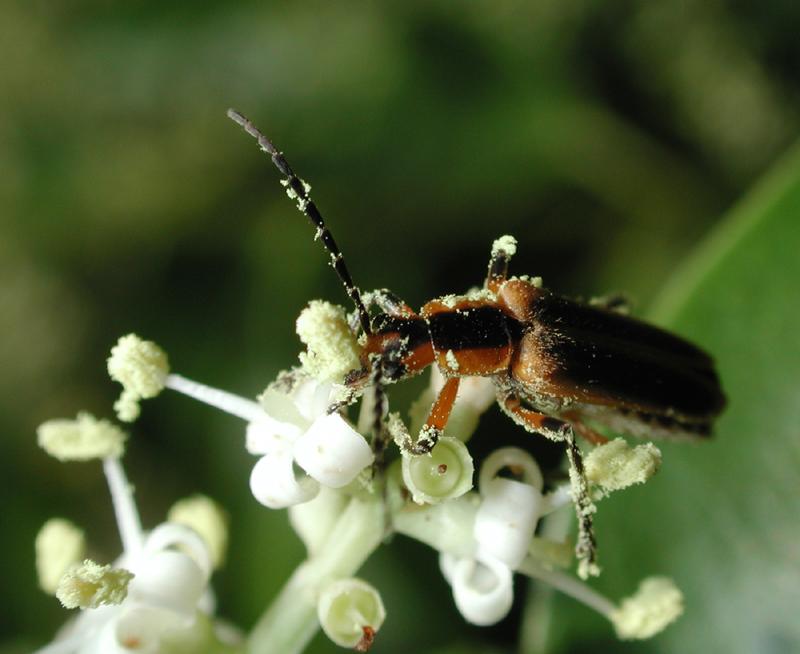
Soldier beetle covered with pollen

Entomophily or insect pollination is a form of pollination whereby pollen of plants, especially but not only of flowering plants, is distributed by insects. Flowers pollinated by insects typically advertise themselves with bright colours, sometimes with conspicuous patterns (honey guides) leading to rewards of pollen and nectar; they may also have an attractive scent which in some cases mimics insect pheromones. Insect pollinators such as bees have adaptations for their role, such as lapping or sucking mouthparts to take in nectar, and in some species also pollen baskets on their hind legs. This required the coevolution of insects and flowering plants in the development of pollination behaviour by the insects and pollination mechanisms by the flowers, benefiting both groups. Both the size and the density of a population are known to affect pollination and subsequent reproductive performance.

== Coevolution ==
=== History ===
The early spermatophytes (seed plants) were largely dependent on the wind to carry their pollen from one plant to another. Prior to the appearance of flowering plants some gymnosperms, such as Bennettitales, developed flower-like structures that were likely insect pollinated. The earliest fossil evidence of insect pollination for gymnosperms is from the early Permian period (Kungurian stage) based on five compression fossils of Tillyardembia from Russia, which show the gymnosperm pollen attached to their heads, thoraces, legs and abdomens. Candidates for pollinators include extinct long proboscis insect groups, including Aneuretopsychid, Mesopsychid and Pseudopolycentropodid scorpionflies, Kalligrammatid and Paradoxosisyrine lacewings and Zhangsolvid flies, as well as some extant families that specialised on gymnosperms before switching to angiosperms, including Nemestrinid, Tabanid and Acrocerid flies. Living cycads have mutualistic relationships with specific insect species (typically beetles) which pollinate them. Such relationships extend back to at least the late Mesozoic, with both oedemerid beetles (which today are exclusively found on flowering plants) and boganiid beetles (which still pollinate cycads today) from the Cretaceous being found with preserved cycad pollen. Angiosperms (flowering plants) first appeared during the Early Cretaceous, and during the angiosperm radiation from 125 to 90 Ma, would displace many of the gymnosperm lineages and cause the extinction of many of their pollinators, while some would transition to angiosperms and some new families would form pollination associations with angiosperms. Traits such as sapromyophily (emitting the odour of carrion to attract flies) have evolved independently in several unrelated angiosperm families.

=== The plant's needs ===
Wind and water pollination require the production of vast quantities of pollen because of the chancy nature of its deposition. If they are not to be reliant on the wind or water (for aquatic species), plants need pollinators to move their pollen grains from one plant to another. They particularly need pollinators to consistently choose flowers of the same species, so they have evolved different lures to encourage specific pollinators to maintain fidelity to the same species. The attractions offered are mainly nectar, pollen, fragrances and oils. The ideal pollinating insect is hairy (so that pollen adheres to it), and spends time exploring the flower so that it comes into contact with the reproductive structures.

=== Mechanisms ===
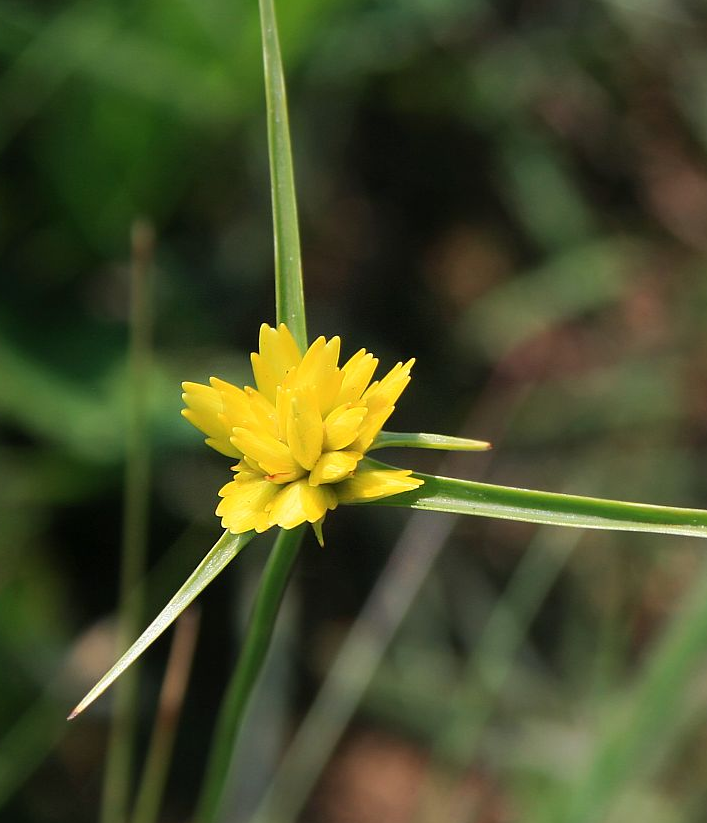
Cyperus sphaerocephalus

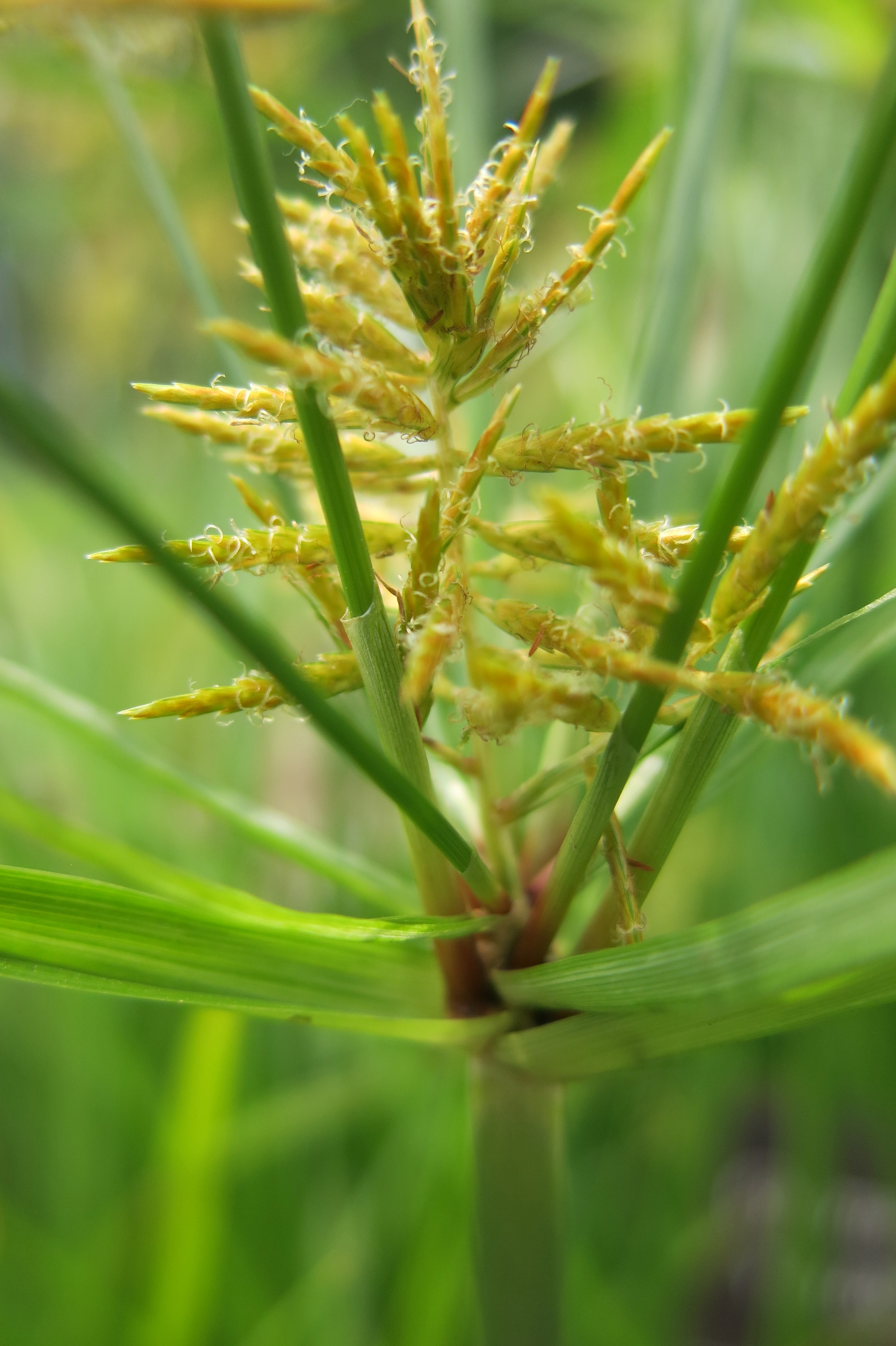
Cyperus esculentus

Insect-pollinated flowers are usually more striking than wind-pollinated flowers, as they need to advertise themselves to insects. Compare the flowers of the insect-pollinated sedge Cyperus sphaerocephalus and the closely related, but wind-pollinated, Cyperus esculentus.

Many insects are pollinators, particularly bees, Lepidoptera (butterflies and moths), wasps, flies, ants and beetles. On the other hand, some plants are generalists, being pollinated by insects in several orders. Entomophilous plant species have frequently evolved mechanisms to make themselves more appealing to insects, e.g., brightly coloured or scented flowers, nectar, or appealing shapes and patterns. Pollen grains of entomophilous plants are generally larger than the fine pollens of anemophilous (wind-pollinated) plants, which has to be produced in much larger quantities because such a high proportion is wasted. This is energetically costly, but in contrast, entomophilous plants have to bear the energetic costs of producing nectar.

Butterflies and moths have hairy bodies and long proboscides which can probe deep into tubular flowers. Butterflies mostly fly by day and are particularly attracted to pink, mauve and purple flowers. The flowers are often large and scented, and the stamens are so-positioned that pollen is deposited on the insects while they feed on the nectar. Moths are mostly nocturnal and are attracted by night-blooming plants. The flowers of these are often tubular, pale in colour and fragrant only at night. Hawkmoths tend to visit larger flowers and hover as they feed; they transfer pollen by means of the proboscis. Other moths land on the usually smaller flowers, which may be aggregated into flowerheads. Their energetic needs are not so great as those of hawkmoths and they are offered smaller quantities of nectar.

Inflorescences pollinated by beetles tend to be flat with open corollas or small flowers clustered in a head with multiple, projecting anthers that shed pollen readily. The flowers are often green or pale-coloured, and heavily scented, often with fruity or spicy aromas, but sometimes with odours of decaying organic matter. Some, like the giant water lily, include traps designed to retain the beetles in contact with the reproductive parts for longer periods.

Unspecialised flies with short proboscides are found visiting primitive flowers with readily accessible nectar. More specialised flies like syrphids and Tabanids can visit more advanced blooms, but their purpose is to nourish themselves, and any transfer of pollen from one flower to another happens haphazardly. The small size of many flies is often made up for by their abundance, however they are unreliable pollinators as they may bear incompatible pollen, and lack of suitable breeding habitats may limit their activities. Some Pterostylis orchids are pollinated by midges unique to each species. Due to mutual specialisation, pollinators are highly dependent on floral diversity. Therefore, losses in plant diversity, such as those carried on by increasing land use, may be linked to extinctions of pollinators. A decline, for whatever reason, to one side of this partnership can be catastrophic for the other.

Flowers pollinated by bees and wasps vary in shape, colour and size. Yellow or blue plants are often visited, and flowers may have ultra-violet nectar guides, that help the insect to find the nectary. Some flowers, like sage or pea, have lower lips that will only open when sufficiently heavy insects, such as bees, land on them. With the lip depressed, the anthers may bow down to deposit pollen on the insect's back. Other flowers, like tomato, may only liberate their pollen by buzz pollination, a technique in which a bumblebee will cling on to a flower while vibrating its flight muscles, and this dislodges the pollen. Because bees care for their brood, they need to collect more food than just to maintain themselves, and therefore are important pollinators. Other bees are nectar thieves and bite their way through the corolla in order to raid the nectary, in the process bypassing the reproductive structures.

Ants are not well adapted to pollination but they have been shown to perform this function in Polygonum cascadense and in certain desert plants with small blossoms near the ground with little fragrance or visual attraction, small quantities of nectar and limited quantities of sticky pollen.

=== Plant-insect pairings ===
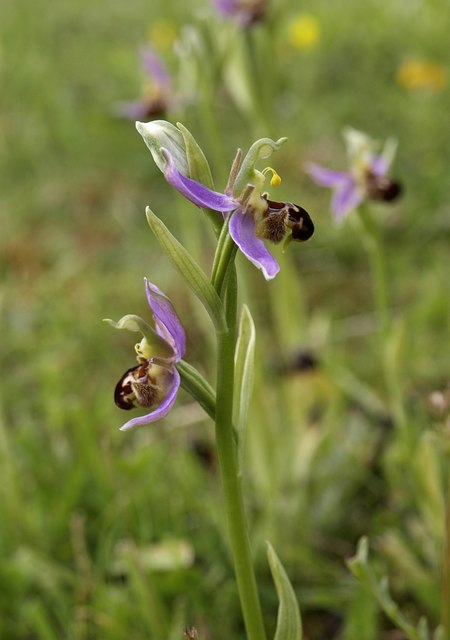
The bee orchid mimics bees in appearance and scent, implying close coevolution of a species of flower and a species of insect.

Some plant species co-evolved with a particular pollinator species, such as the bee orchid. The species is almost exclusively self-pollinating in its northern ranges, but is pollinated by the solitary bee Eucera in the Mediterranean area. The plant attracts these insects by producing a scent that mimics the scent of the female bee. In addition, the lip acts as a decoy, as the male bee confuses it with a female that is visiting a pink flower. Pollen transfer occurs during the ensuing pseudocopulation.

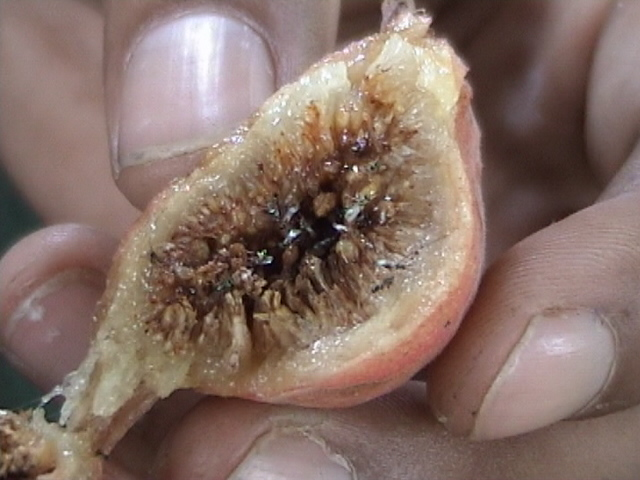
Cross section of a Ficus glomerata (fig) fruit showing the syconium with pollinating fig wasps inside.

Figs in the genus Ficus have a mutualistic arrangement with certain tiny agaonid wasps. In the common fig, the inflorescence is a syconium, formed by an enlarged, fleshy, hollow receptacle with multiple ovaries on the inner surface. A female wasp enters through a narrow aperture, fertilizes these pistillate flowers, and lays its eggs in some ovaries, with galls being formed by the developing larvae. In due course, staminate flowers develop inside the syconium. Wingless male wasps hatch and mate with females in the galls before tunnelling their way out of the developing fruit. The winged females, now laden with pollen, follow, flying off to find other receptive syconia at the right stage of development. Most species of fig have their own unique commensal species of wasp.

== Etymology ==
The word is artificially derived from the Greek: εντομο-, entomo- "cut in pieces, segmented", hence "insect"; and φίλη, phile, "loved".

== Taxonomic range ==
Wind pollination is the reproductive strategy adopted by the grasses, sedges, rushes and catkin-bearing plants. Other flowering plants are mostly pollinated by insects (or birds or bats), which seems to be the primitive state, and some plants have secondarily developed wind pollination. Some plants that are wind pollinated have vestigial nectaries, and other plants like common heather that are regularly pollinated by insects, produce clouds of pollen and some wind pollination is inevitable. The hoary plantain is primarily wind pollinated, but is also visited by insects which pollinate it. In general, showy, colourful, fragrant flowers like sunflowers, orchids and Buddleja are insect pollinated. The only entomophilous plants that are not seed plants are the dung-mosses of the family Splachnaceae.

== See also ==
- List of crop plants pollinated by bees
