= Coenomyiodes edwardsi =

Scientific classification
- Kingdom: Animalia
- Phylum: Arthropoda
- Class: Insecta
- Order: Diptera
- Superfamily: Stratiomyoidea
- Family: Xylomyidae
- Genus: Coenomyiodes; Brunetti, 1920
- Species: C. edwardsi

Binomial name
- Coenomyiodes edwardsi Brunetti, 1920

Synonyms
- Xylomyia gigas Enderlein, 1921

Species of fly

Coenomyiodes edwardsi is a species of Fly in the family Xylomyidae, the "wood soldier flies".

== Distribution ==
India & Nepal.
