= Xylomya pallidifemur =

Scientific classification
- Kingdom: Animalia
- Phylum: Arthropoda
- Class: Insecta
- Order: Diptera
- Family: Xylomyidae
- Genus: Xylomya
- Species: X. pallidifemur

Binomial name
- Xylomya pallidifemur Malloch, 1917

Species of fly

Xylomya pallidifemur is a species of fly in the family Xylomyidae.

== Distribution ==
Canada, United States.
