= Opetiops =

Scientific classification
- Kingdom: Animalia
- Phylum: Arthropoda
- Class: Insecta
- Order: Diptera
- Family: Pantophthalmidae
- Genus: Opetiops; Enderlein, 1921
- Species: O. alienus

Binomial name
- Opetiops alienus (Hermann, 1916)

Synonyms
- Pantophthalmus alienus Hermann, 1916

Genus of flies

Opetiops is a genus of timber flies (family Pantophthalmidae) containing a single described species, Opetiops alienus, occurring in Colombia, Peru, Brazil, and Paraguay. It is the only member of the family Pantophthalmidae that is not in the genus Pantophthalmus.
