= Xylomya tenthredinoides =

Scientific classification
- Kingdom: Animalia
- Phylum: Arthropoda
- Class: Insecta
- Order: Diptera
- Family: Xylomyidae
- Genus: Xylomya
- Species: X. tenthredinoides

Binomial name
- Xylomya tenthredinoides (Wulp, 1867)

Synonyms
- Subula tenthredinoides Wulp, 1867

Species of fly

Xylomya tenthredinoides is a species of fly in the family Xylomyidae.

== Distribution ==
Canada, United States.
