= Xylomya americana =

Scientific classification
- Kingdom: Animalia
- Phylum: Arthropoda
- Class: Insecta
- Order: Diptera
- Family: Xylomyidae
- Genus: Xylomya
- Species: X. americana

Binomial name
- Xylomya americana (Wiedemann, 1821)

Synonyms
- Xylophagus americana Wiedemann, 1821

Species of fly

Xylomya americana is a species of fly in the family Xylomyidae.

== Distribution ==
Canada, United States, Mexico.
