= Xylomya parens =

Scientific classification
- Kingdom: Animalia
- Phylum: Arthropoda
- Class: Insecta
- Order: Diptera
- Family: Xylomyidae
- Genus: Xylomya
- Species: X. parens

Binomial name
- Xylomya parens (Williston, 1885)

Synonyms
- Subula parens Williston, 1885; Xylomya farcus Washburn, 1905

Species of fly

Xylomya parens is a species of fly in the family Xylomyidae.

== Distribution ==
Canada, United States.
