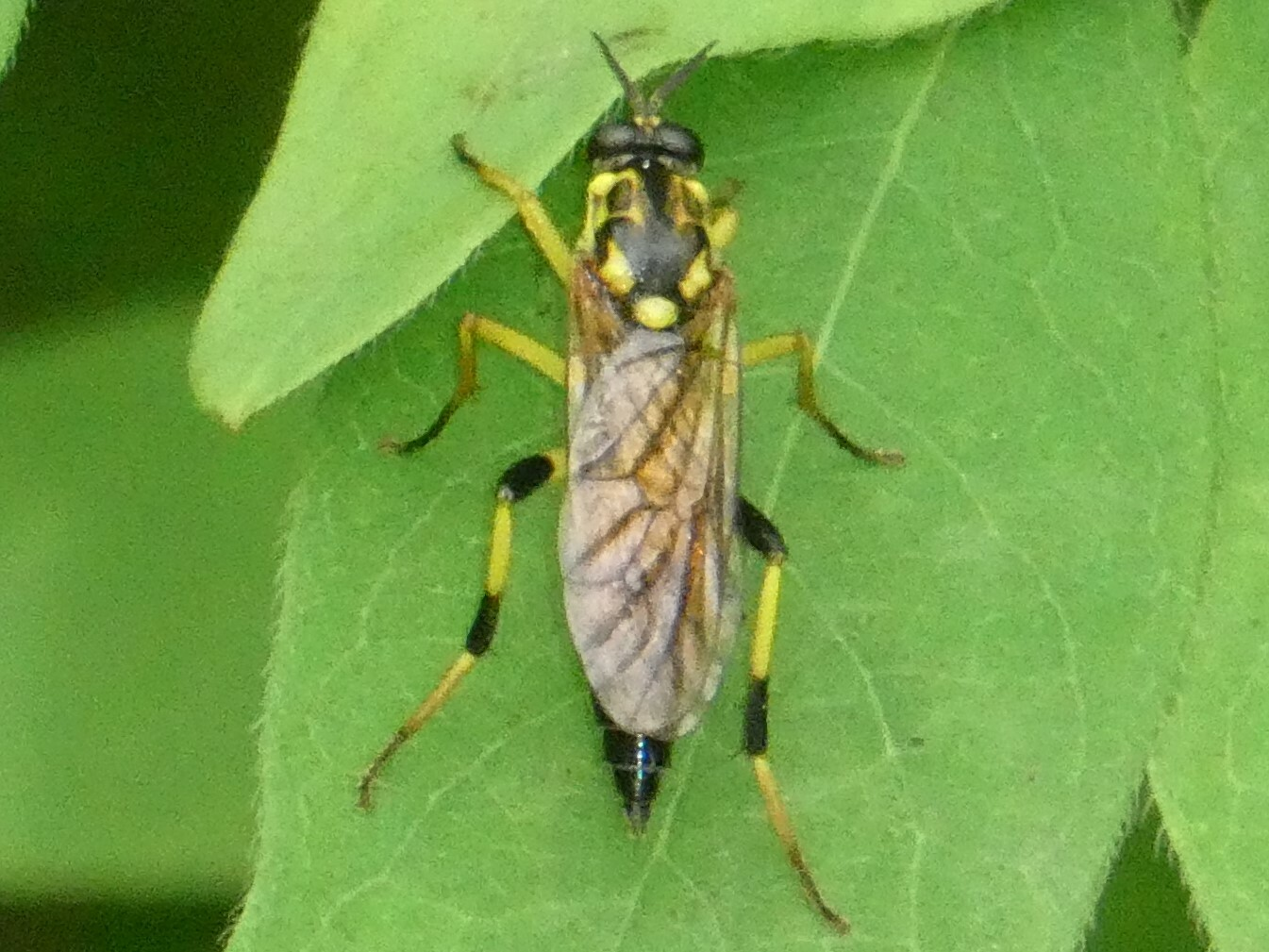

Scientific classification
- Kingdom: Animalia
- Phylum: Arthropoda
- Class: Insecta
- Order: Diptera
- Family: Xylomyidae
- Genus: Xylomya
- Species: X. terminalis

Binomial name
- Xylomya terminalis Vasey, 1977

= Xylomya terminalis =

Species of fly

Xylomya terminalis is a species of fly in the family Xylomyidae.

== Distribution ==
United States.
