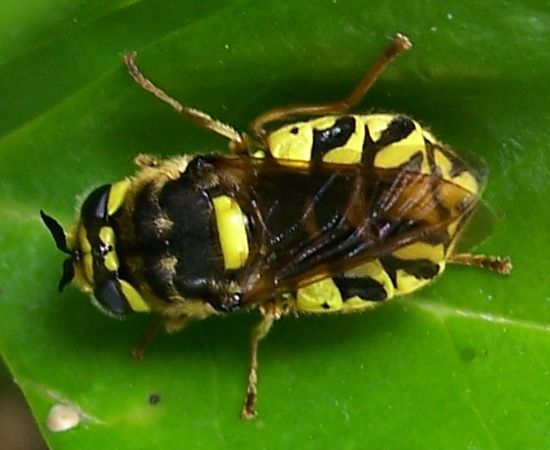
- Stratiomys maculosa (Stratiomyidae)

Scientific classification
- Kingdom: Animalia
- Phylum: Arthropoda
- Clade: Pancrustacea
- Class: Insecta
- Order: Diptera
- Suborder: Brachycera
- Infraorder: Stratiomyomorpha
- Superfamily: Stratiomyoidea; Hendel, 1928

Families
- Pantophthalmidae Bigot, 1886; Stratiomyidae Latreille, 1802; Xylomyidae de Meijere, 1913; †Zhangsolvidae Nagatomi and Yang 1998

= Stratiomyoidea =

Superfamily of flies

Stratiomyoidea is a superfamily of flies (order Diptera).

The antennae have a primitive structure. A characteristic morphological characteristic of one family, Pantophthalmidae, is the size of the body: this family includes some species that are among the largest Diptera, reaching wingspans of up to 10 cm.

Stratiomyoidea larvae live in aquatic or terrestrial habitats and are mostly scavengers that feed on organic material.

These flies can be easily distinguished as adults by the following characters: radial veins grouped together anteriorly, ending before tip of the wing; costal vein, usually ending well before wing apex and discal cell.
