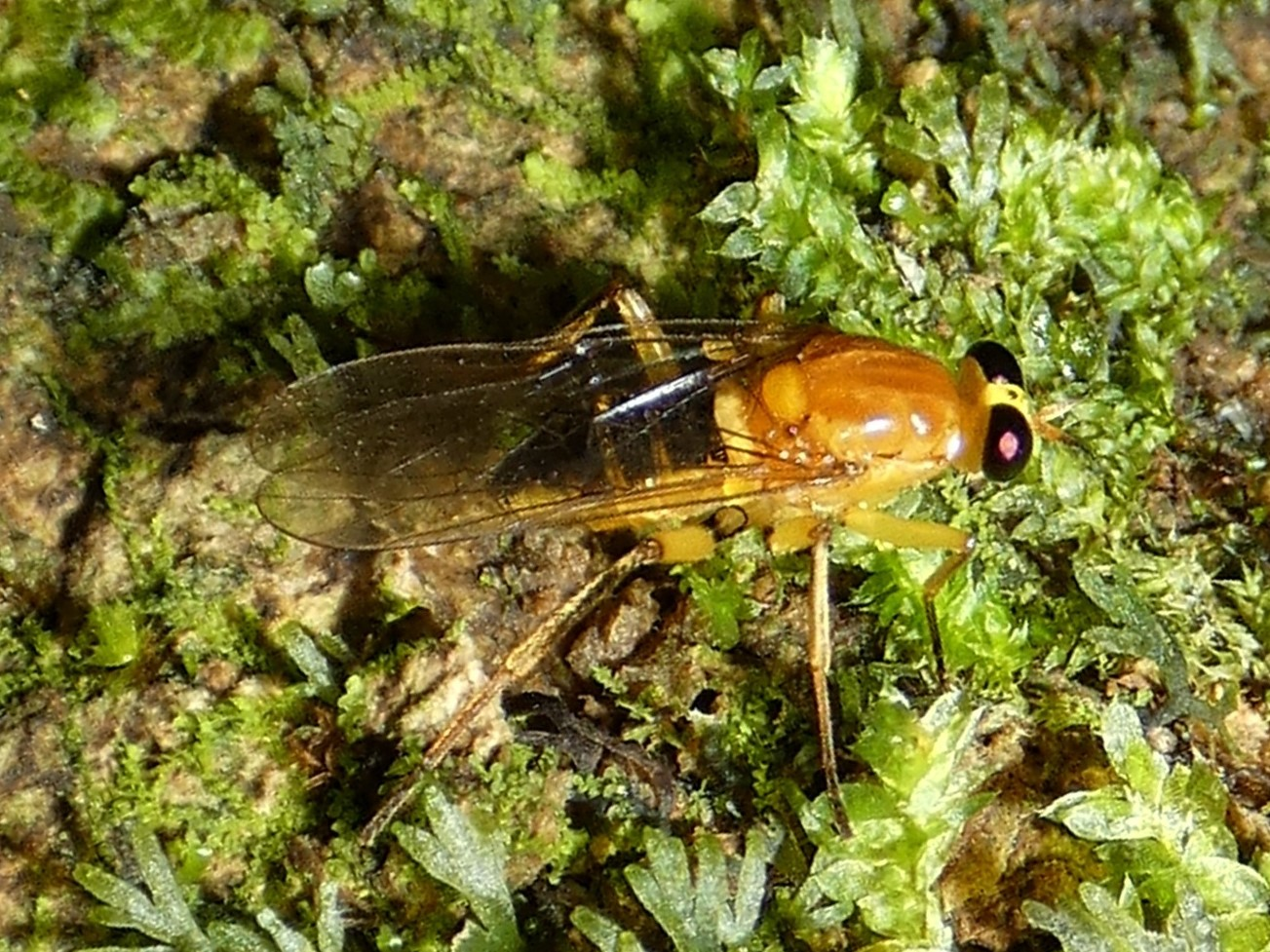
- Arthropeina fulva

Scientific classification
- Kingdom: Animalia
- Phylum: Arthropoda
- Clade: Pancrustacea
- Class: Insecta
- Order: Diptera
- Family: Xylomyidae
- Genus: Arthropeina; Lindner, 1949

Type species
- Arthropeina fulva Lindner, 1949

= Arthropeina =

Genus of flies

Arthropeina is a genus of flies in the family Xylomyidae, the "wood soldier flies".

== Species ==
- A. colombiana Fachin & Amorim, 2014
- A. diadelothorax Fachin & Amorim, 2014
- A. fulva Lindner, 1949
- A. lindneri Fachin & Amorim, 2014
- A. melanochroma Fachin & Amorim, 2014
- A. pseudofulva Fachin & Amorim, 2014
