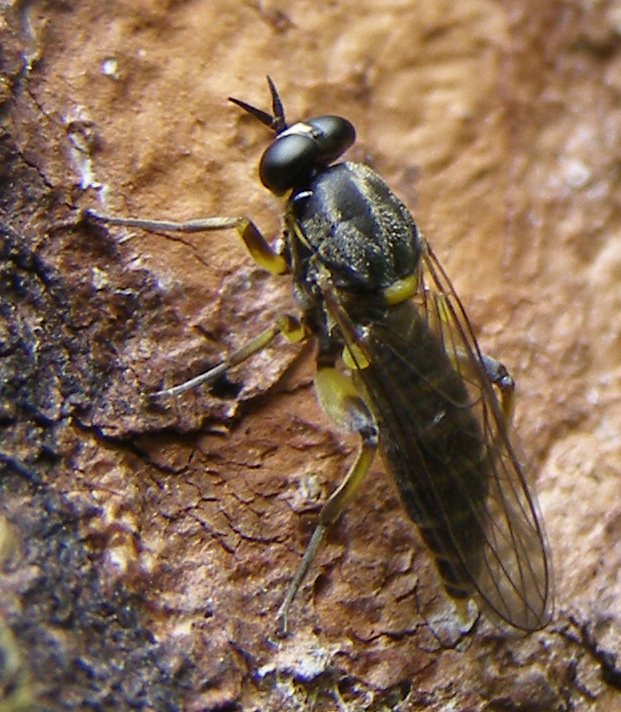
- Solva marginata

Scientific classification
- Kingdom: Animalia
- Phylum: Arthropoda
- Class: Insecta
- Order: Diptera
- Family: Xylomyidae
- Genus: Solva; Walker, 1859

Type species
- Solva inamoena Walker, 1859

Synonyms
- Ceratosolva de Meijere, 1914; Formosolva James, 1939; Hanauia Enderlein, 1920; Hanavia Brunetti, 1923; Pararthropeas Brunetti, 1920; Phloophila Hull, 1944; Salva Ouchi, 1943; Prista Enderlein, 1913; Subulonia Enderlein, 1913

= Solva (fly) =

Genus of flies

Solva is a fly genus in the family Xylomyidae, the "wood soldier flies".

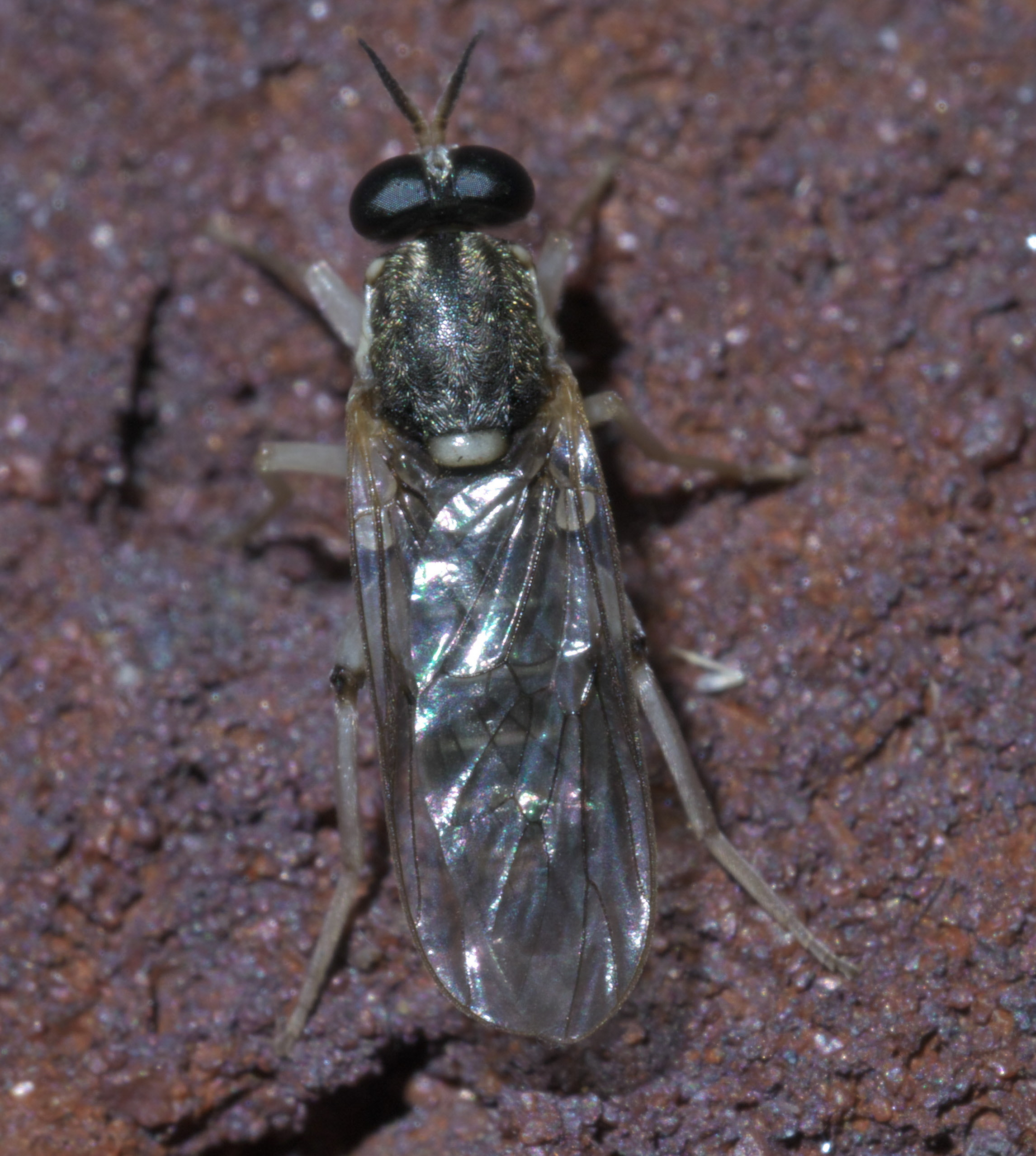
Solva pallipes

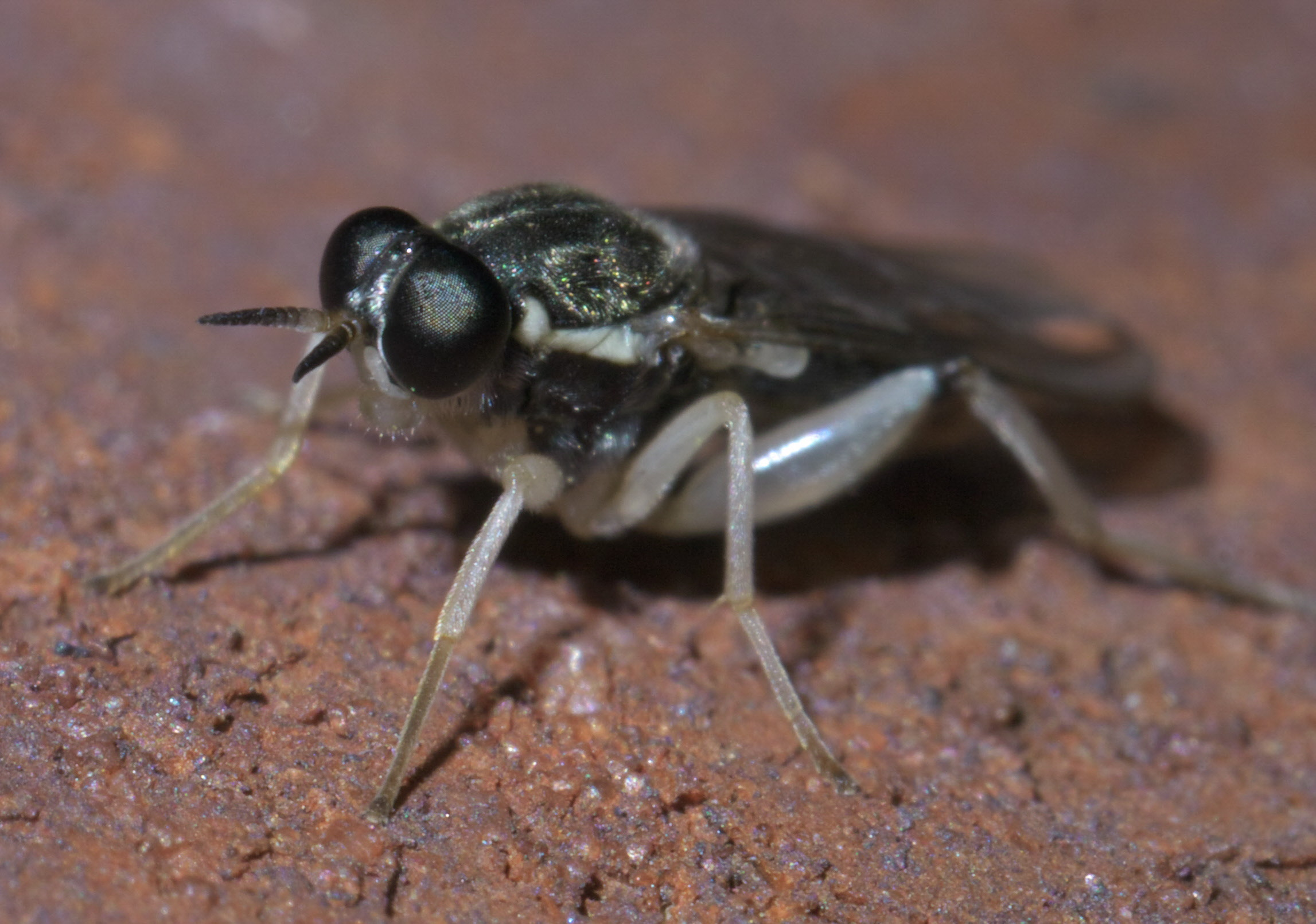
Solva pallipes

== Species ==
- Solva apicimacula Yang & Nagatomi, 1993
- Solva atrata Daniels, 1977
- Solva aurifrons James, 1939
- Solva aurolimbata (Lindner, 1935)
- Solva basalis Frey, 1960
- Solva basiflava Yang & Nagatomi, 1993
- Solva bergi James, 1951
- Solva binghami Enderlein, 1921
- Solva brasiliana (Lindner, 1949)
- Solva cabrerae (Becker, 1908)
- Solva caffra (Bigot, 1879)
- Solva caiusi Séguy, 1956
- Solva calopodata (Bigot, 1879)
- Solva clavata Yang & Nagatomi, 1993
- Solva completa (Meijere, 1914)
- Solva concavifrons James, 1939
- Solva confusa Hollis, 1962
- Solva crepuscula Hull, 1944
- Solva cylindricornis (Meijere, 1914)
- Solva decora Webb, 1984
- Solva devexifrons (Yang & Nagatomi, 1993)
- Solva dorsiflava Yang & Nagatomi, 1993
- Solva fascipennis (Meijere, 1919)
- Solva flavicoxis (Enderlein, 1921)
- Solva flavipes (Doleschall, 1858)
- Solva flavipilosa Yang & Nagatomi, 1993
- Solva flavoscutellaris (Matsumura, 1915)
- Solva formosipes Frey, 1960
- Solva furcicera Adisoemarto, 1973
- Solva gracilifemur (Lindner, 1939)
- Solva gracilipes Yang & Nagatomi, 1993
- Solva harmandi Séguy, 1956
- Solva hubensis Yang & Nagatomi, 1993
- Solva hybotoides Walker, 1861
- Solva ichneumonea (Frey, 1960)
- Solva ichneumoniformis Enderlein, 1913
- Solva illustris Frey, 1960
- Solva inamoena Walker, 1859
- Solva inconspicua (Brunetti, 1923)
- Solva inornata Melander, 1949
- Solva intermedia (Brunetti, 1923)
- Solva japonica Frey, 1960
- Solva javana (Meijere, 1907)
- Solva javana var. floresensis Frey, 1934
- Solva kambaitiensis Frey, 1960
- Solva kinabalu Woodley, 2004
- Solva kusigematii Yang & Nagatomi, 1993
- Solva laeta Daniels, 1977
- Solva longicornis Enderlein, 1913
- Solva lugubris Szilády, 1941
- Solva luzonensis (Enderlein, 1921)
- Solva macroscelis (Speiser, 1923)
- Solva maindroni Séguy, 1947
- Solva maniema Speiser, 1923
- Solva marginata (Meigen, 1820)
- Solva mediomacula Yang & Nagatomi, 1993
- Solva melanogaster Daniels, 1977
- Solva mera Yang & Nagatomi, 1993
- Solva micholitzi (Enderlein, 1921)
- Solva montium Frey, 1960
- Solva nana (Loew, 1850)
- Solva nigra (Brunetti, 1923)
- Solva nigricornis (Brunetti, 1920)
- Solva nigricoxalis Adisoemarto, 1973
- Solva nigricoxis Enderlein, 1921
- Solva nigritibialis (Macquart, 1839)
- Solva nigriventris (Brunetti, 1923)
- Solva nigroscutata Meijere, 1916
- Solva novaeguineae Lindner, 1938
- Solva pallipes (Loew, 1863)
- Solva palmensis Báez, 1988
- Solva planifrons (Yang & Nagatomi, 1993)
- Solva procera (Frey, 1960)
- Solva pulchrina (Frey, 1960)
- Solva rectitibia Frey, 1960
- Solva remota Krivosheina, 1972
- Solva richterae Krivosheina, 2015
- Solva rufiventris (Bigot, 1879)
- Solva schuitnikowi Pleske, 1928
- Solva shanxiensis Yang & Nagatomi, 1993
- Solva sikkimensis (Enderlein, 1921)
- Solva similis (Brunetti, 1923)
- Solva sinensis Yang & Nagatomi, 1993
- Solva striata Yang & Nagatomi, 1993
- Solva symata Séguy, 1948
- Solva tamys Séguy, 1956
- Solva thereviformis (Brunetti, 1920)
- Solva tigrina Yang & Nagatomi, 1993
- Solva tinctipes Meijere, 1919
- Solva truncativena (Enderlein, 1913)
- Solva tuberculata Webb, 1984
- Solva tuberifrons (Yang & Nagatomi, 1993)
- Solva uniflava Yang & Nagatomi, 1993
- Solva varia (Meigen, 1820)
- Solva varicolor (Bigot, 1891)
- Solva verpa (Enderlein, 1921)
- Solva vittata (Doleschall, 1858)
- Solva yunnanensis Yang & Nagatomi, 1993
