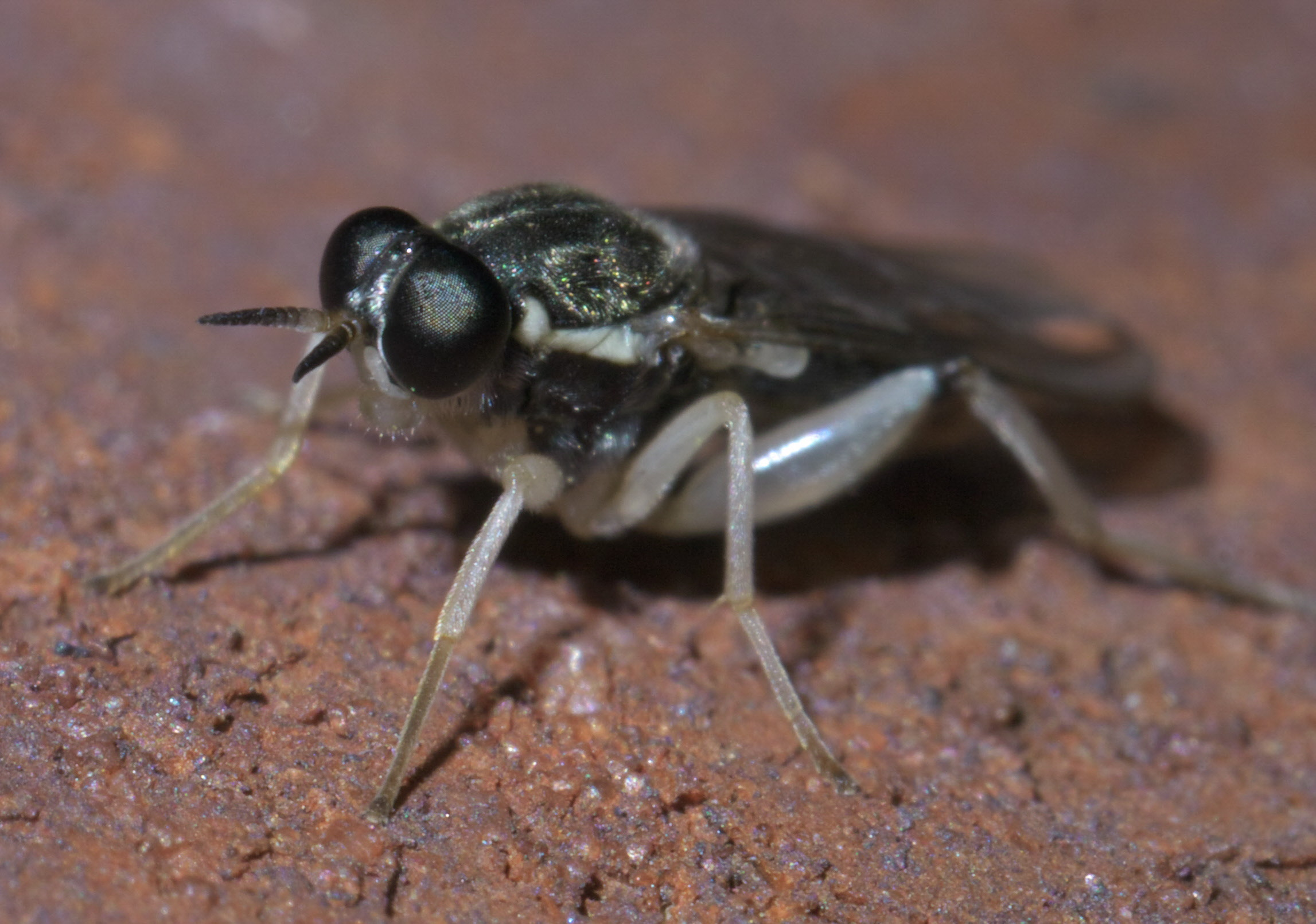

Scientific classification
- Kingdom: Animalia
- Phylum: Arthropoda
- Class: Insecta
- Order: Diptera
- Family: Xylomyidae
- Genus: Solva
- Species: S. pallipes

Binomial name
- Solva pallipes (Loew, 1863)

Synonyms
- Solva pygmaea Hull, 1944; Subula pallipes Loew, 1863; Xylophagus incisuralis Harris, 1835

= Solva pallipes =

Species of insect

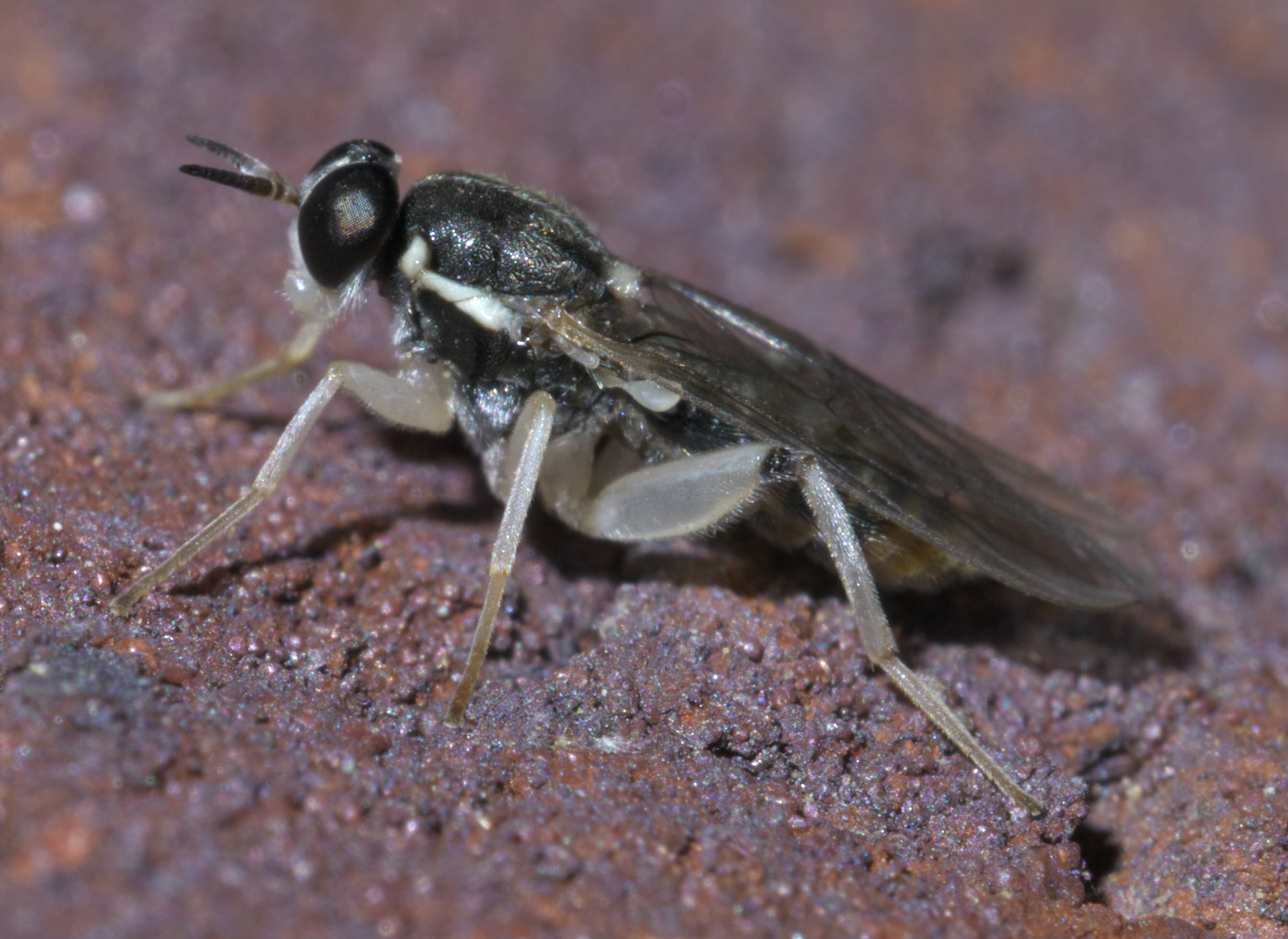

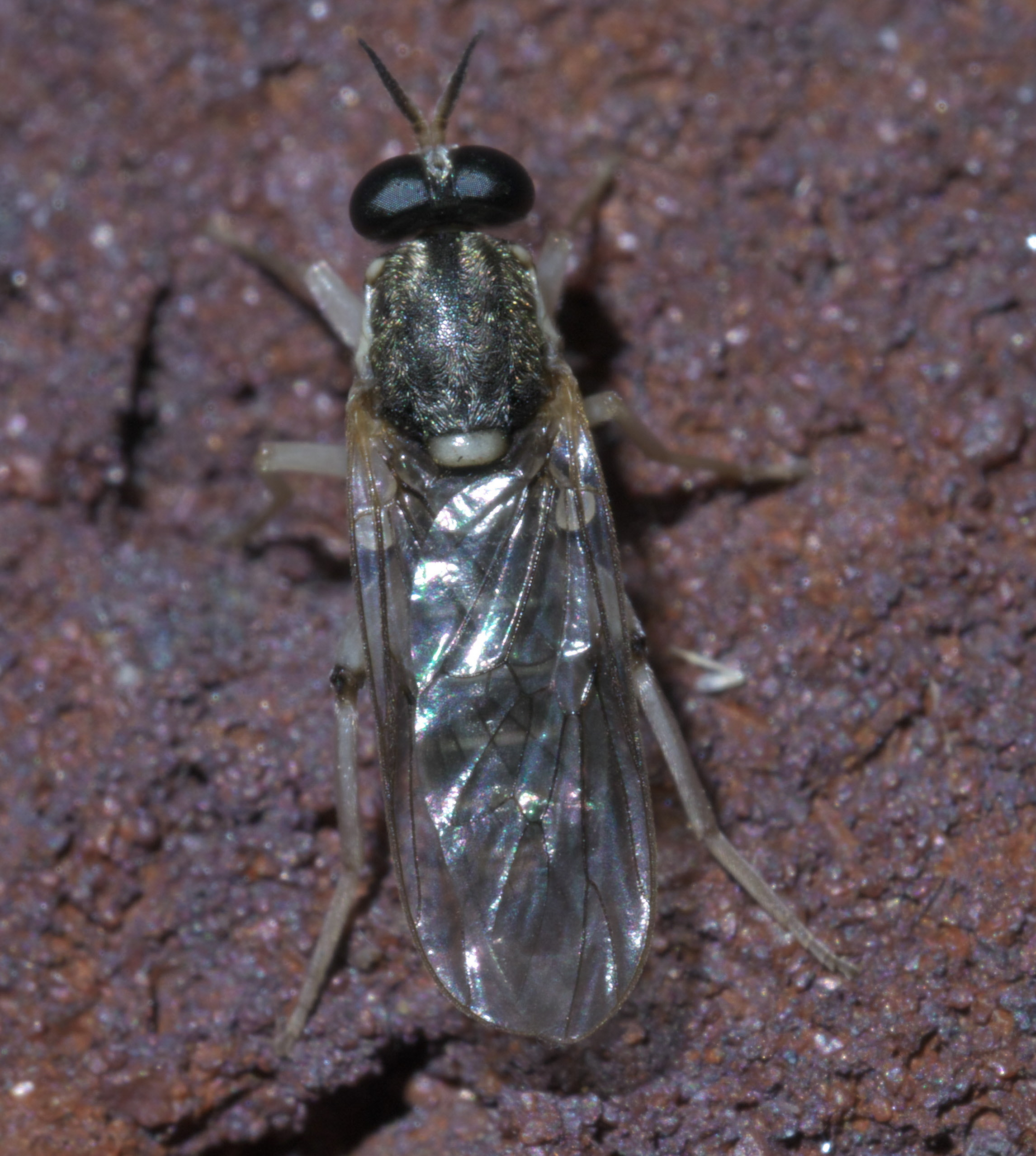

Solva pallipes is a species of fly in the family Xylomyidae. It is found throughout most of North America.

Adults are found in shady, wooded areas, often on tree trunks. They have also been found on Chrysanthemum plants, and are attracted to lights. Larvae have been found underneath the bark of cottonwood, Carolina poplar, Osage orange, and red mulberry trees.
