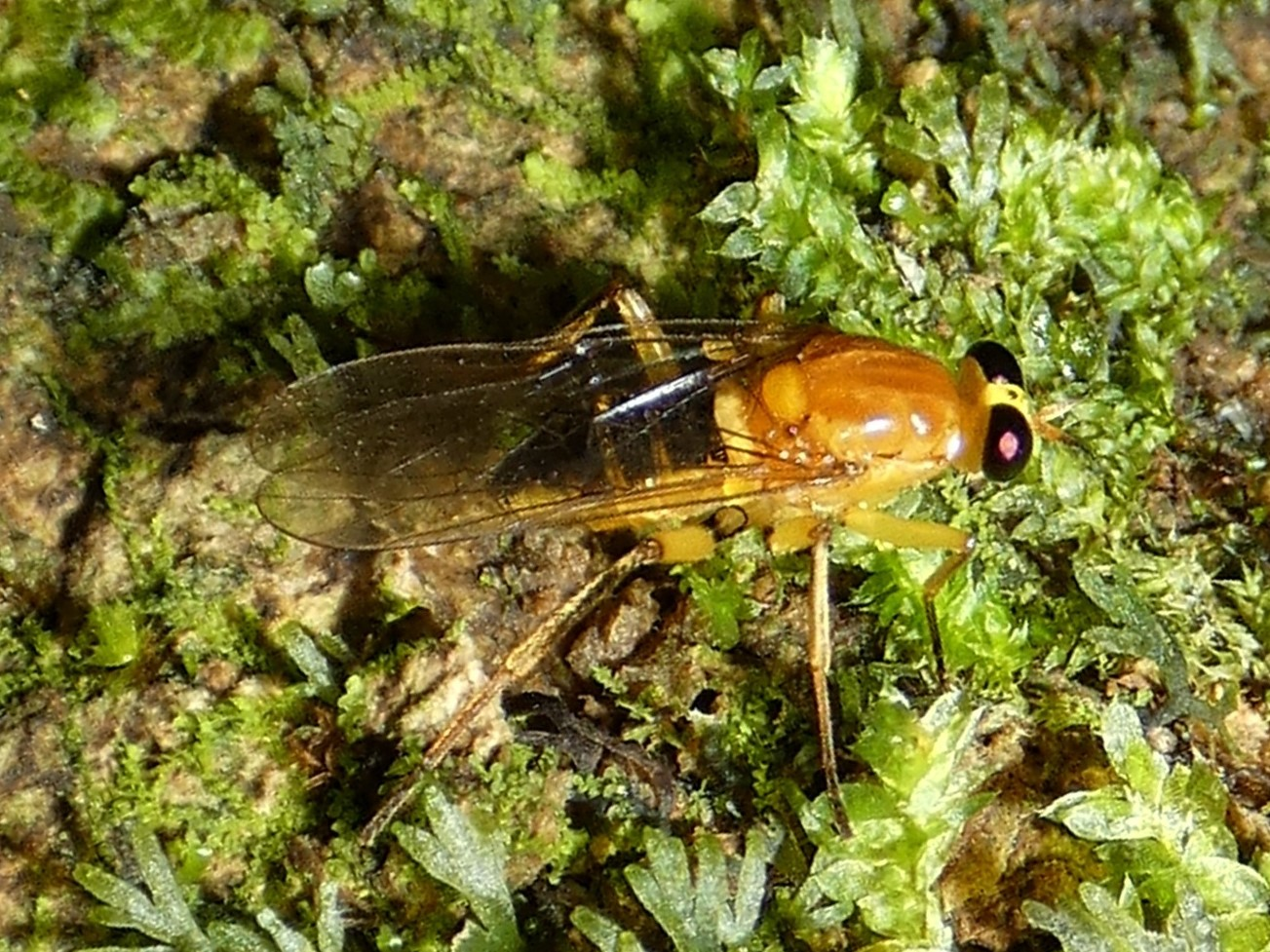

Scientific classification
- Kingdom: Animalia
- Phylum: Arthropoda
- Clade: Pancrustacea
- Class: Insecta
- Order: Diptera
- Family: Xylomyidae
- Genus: Arthropeina
- Species: A. fulva

Binomial name
- Arthropeina fulva Lindner, 1949

= Arthropeina fulva =

Species of fly

Arthropeina fulva is a species of fly in the family Xylomyidae, the "wood soldier flies".

== Distribution ==
Brazil (Santa Catarina)
