= Xylomya simillima =

Scientific classification
- Kingdom: Animalia
- Phylum: Arthropoda
- Class: Insecta
- Order: Diptera
- Family: Xylomyidae
- Genus: Xylomya
- Species: X. simillima

Binomial name
- Xylomya simillima Steyskal, 1947

Species of fly

Xylomya simillima is a species of fly in the family Xylomyidae.

== Distribution ==
United States.
