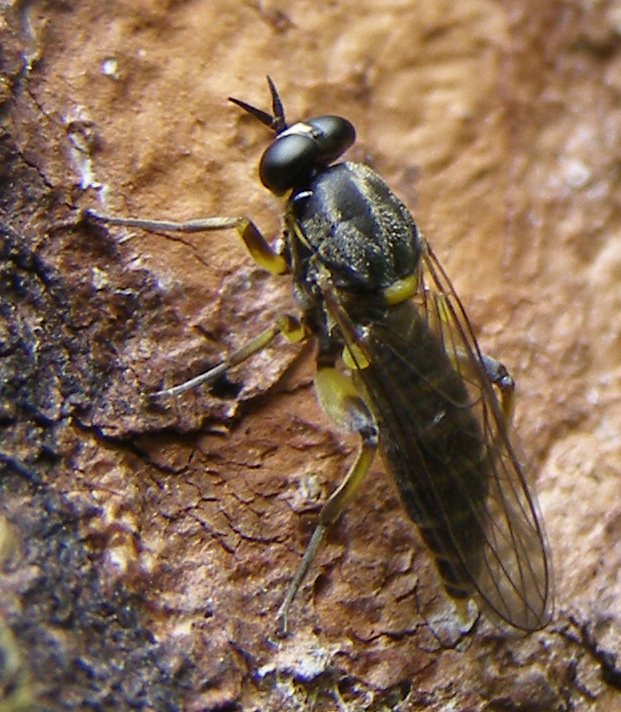

Scientific classification
- Kingdom: Animalia
- Phylum: Arthropoda
- Class: Insecta
- Order: Diptera
- Family: Xylomyidae
- Genus: Solva
- Species: S. marginata

Binomial name
- Solva marginata (Meigen, 1820)

Synonyms
- Xylophagus marginatus Meigen, 1820

= Solva marginata =

Species of fly

Solva marginata, also known as the drab wood-soldierfly, is a species of soldier fly in the family Xylomyidae, the "wood soldier flies".

== Description ==
The body is mostly blackish. The tip of the thorax has some bright yellow markings. The abdomen has pale, narrow bands, and bright yellow markings. It has short, multi-segmented antennae, and looks similar to the sawfly.

== Distribution ==
Austria, Belgium, China, Denmark, England, France, Germany, Mongolia, Netherlands, Poland, Russia, Sweden, Ukraine. This species is widespread in the United Kingdom, but considered scarce and uncommon. It is found mostly in specific local areas in southeast England, East Anglia and East Midlands.

== Habitat ==
This fly is associated with the poplar tree. The larvae live under bark, feeding on rotting wood.
