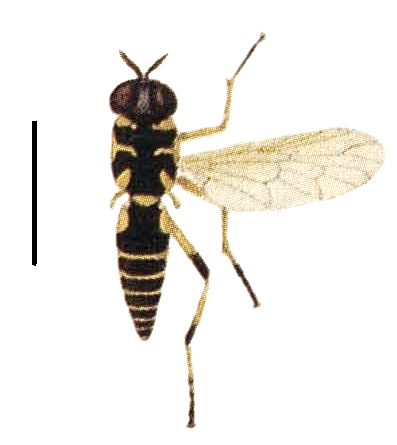
- Xylomya maculata

Scientific classification
- Kingdom: Animalia
- Phylum: Arthropoda
- Class: Insecta
- Order: Diptera
- Family: Xylomyidae
- Genus: Xylomya; Rondani, 1861

Type species
- Xylophagus maculata Meigen, 1804

Synonyms
- Sobvinae Handlirsch, 1924; Subulaomyia Williston, 1896; Subula Meigen, 1820; Macroceromys Bigot, 1877; Nematoceropsis Pleske, 1925; Macroceratomyia Rye, 1879; Hylomyia Washburn, 1905

= Xylomya =

Genus of flies

Xylomya is a fly genus in the family Xylomyidae, the "wood soldier flies".

== Species ==
- Xylomya alamaculata Yang & Nagatomi, 1993
- Xylomya americana (Wiedemann, 1821)
- Xylomya aterrima Johnson, 1903
- Xylomya chekiangensis (Ôuchi, 1938)
- Xylomya ciscaucasica (Pleske, 1928)
- Xylomya czekanovskii (Pleske, 1925)
- Xylomya czekanovskii ssp. tuvensis Krivosheina, 1999
- Xylomya decora Yang & Nagatomi, 1993
- Xylomya elongata (Osten Sacken, 1886)
- Xylomya galloisi (Séguy, 1956)
- Xylomya gracilicorpus Yang & Nagatomi, 1993
- Xylomya maculata (Meigen, 1804)
- Xylomya matsumurai (Nagatomi & Tanaka, 1971)
- Xylomya mlokosiewczi (Pleske, 1925)
- Xylomya moratula Cockerell, 1914
- Xylomya pallidifemur Malloch, 1917
- Xylomya parens (Williston, 1885)
- Xylomya sauteri (James, 1939)
- Xylomya shcherbakovi Mostovski, 1999
- Xylomya shikokuana (Miyatake, 1965)
- Xylomya sichuanensis Yang & Nagatomi, 1993
- Xylomya simillima Steyskal, 1947
- Xylomya sinica Yang & Nagatomi, 1993
- Xylomya sordida (Pleske, 1928)
- Xylomya tenthredinoides (Wulp, 1867)
- Xylomya terminalis Vasey, 1977
- Xylomya trinotata (Bigot, 1880)
- Xylomya wenxiana Yang, Gao & An, 1995
- Xylomya xixiana Yang, Gao & An, 2002
- Xylomya yasumatsui (Nagatomi & Tanaka, 1971)
- Xylomya zhelochovtsevi Krivosheina, 1999
- Xylomyia longicornis Matsumura, 1915
- Xylomyia luteicornis Frey, 1960
- Xylomyia moiwana Matsumura, 1915
- Xylomyia prista Enderlein, 1913
- Xylomyia semimaculata Frey, 1960
