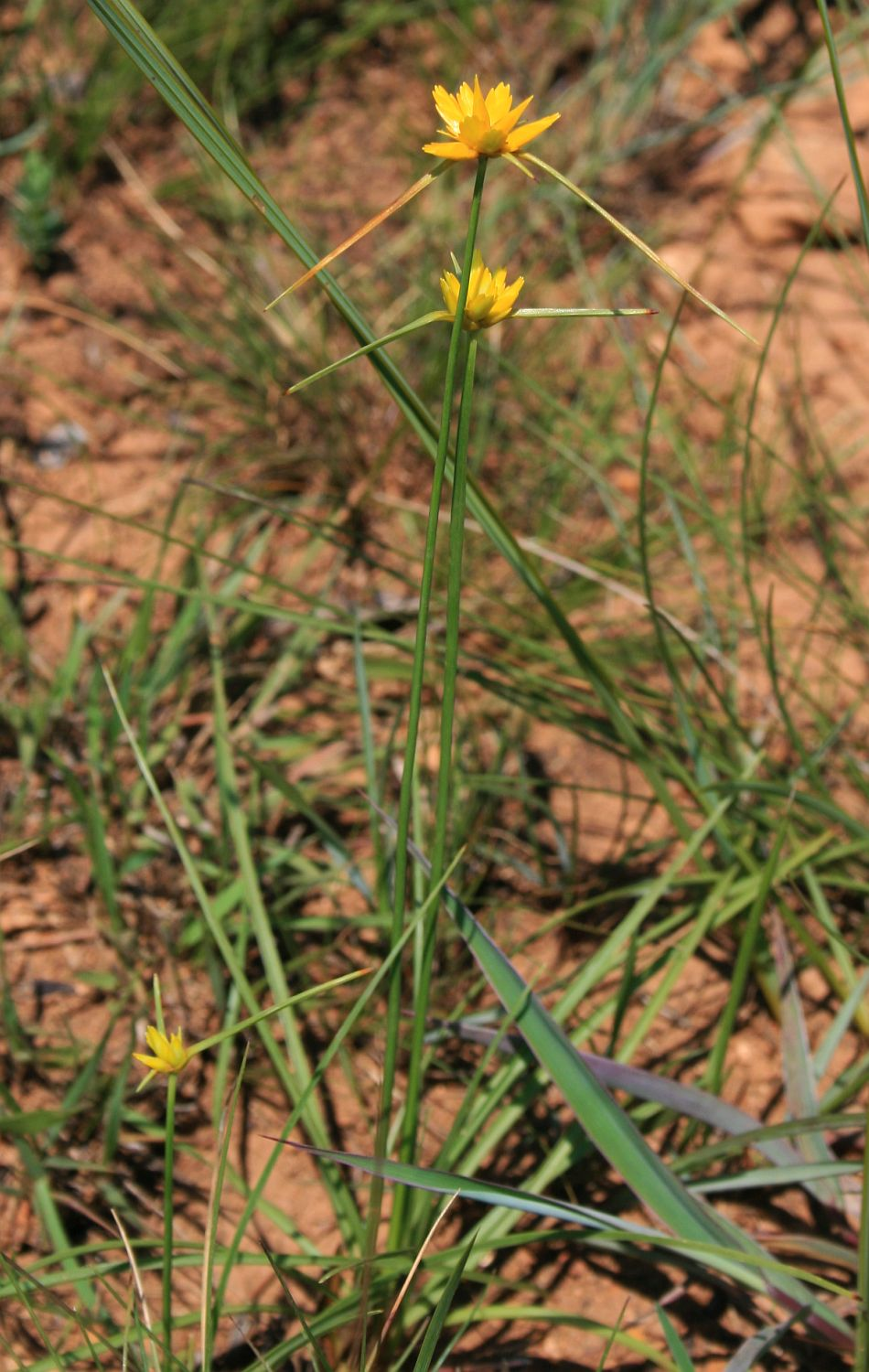
- Cyperus sphaerocephalus with flower, in eSwatini

Scientific classification
- Kingdom: Plantae
- Clade: Tracheophytes
- Clade: Angiosperms
- Clade: Monocots
- Clade: Commelinids
- Order: Poales
- Family: Cyperaceae
- Genus: Cyperus
- Species: C. sphaerocephalus

Binomial name
- Cyperus sphaerocephalus Vahl

= Cyperus sphaerocephalus =

Species of sedge

Cyperus sphaerocephalus is a species of sedge that is native to parts of Africa. In South Africa, it is called the golden headed sedge.

The species was first formally described by the botanist Martin Vahl in 1805. Unlike many sedges, C. sphaerocephalus is believed to be pollinated by insects, hence the more conspicuous and colourful flowers.

== See also ==
- List of Cyperus species
