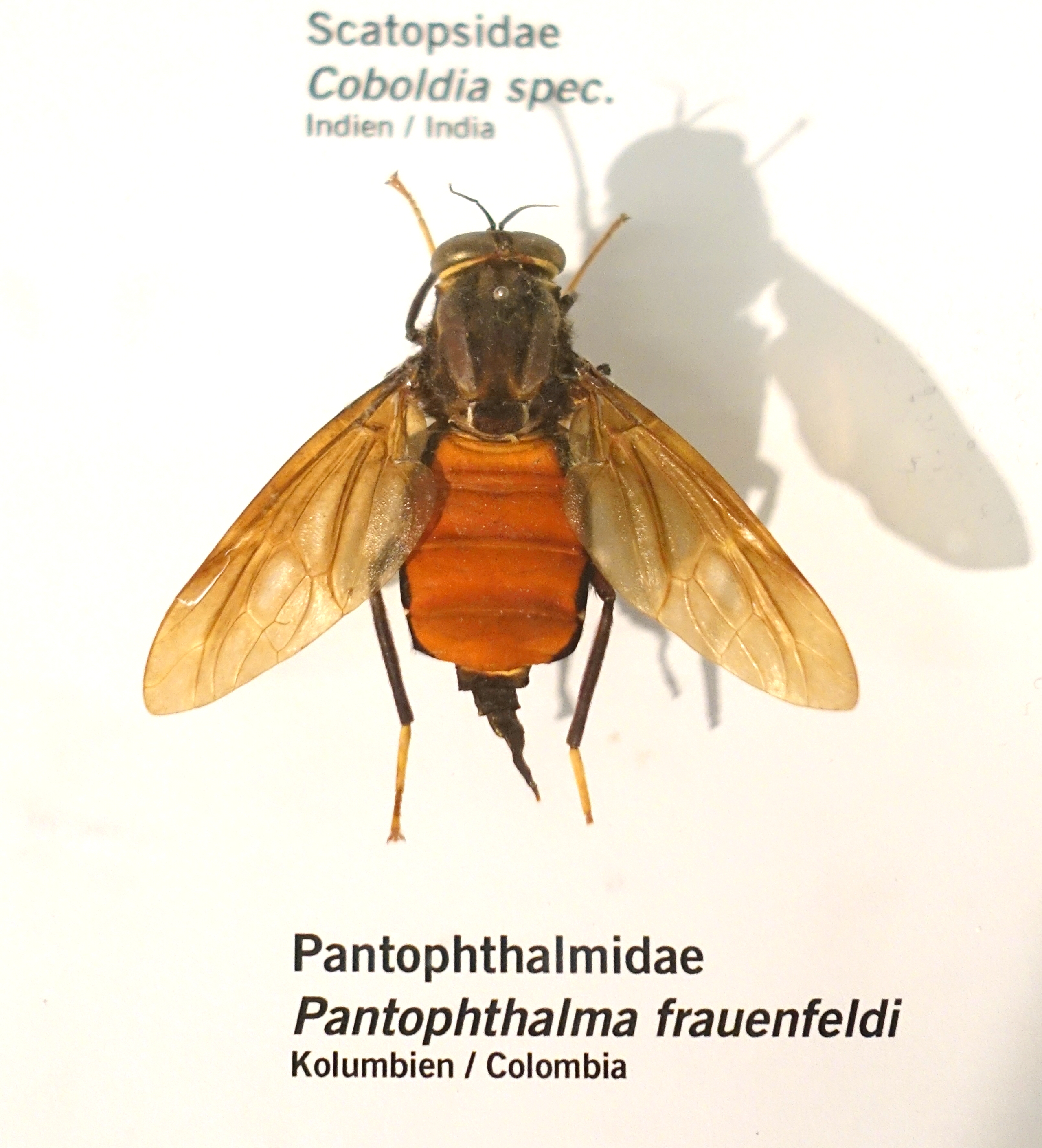
- Pantophthalmus frauenfeldi

Scientific classification
- Kingdom: Animalia
- Phylum: Arthropoda
- Class: Insecta
- Order: Diptera
- Family: Pantophthalmidae
- Genus: Pantophthalmus; Thunberg, 1819

Type species
- Pantophthalmus tabaninus Thunberg, 1819

Synonyms
- Pantophtalmus Thunberg, 1819 (Missp.); Panophthalmus Thunberg, 1819 (Missp.); Rhaphiorhynchus Wiedemann, 1821; Acanthomera Wiedemann, 1821; Raphiorhynchus Lepeletier & Audinet-Serville, 1825 (Missp.); Megalomyia Bigot, 1880; Megalemyia Bigot, 1880 (Missp.); Atopomyia Austen, 1923; Atopomia Austen, 1923 (Missp.); Lycops Enderlein, 1931; Meraca Enderlein, 1934

= Pantophthalmus =

Genus of flies

Pantophthalmus is a genus of large, robust flies whose larvae feed on living and dead trees, and contains all but one of the species in the family Pantophthalmidae.

== Species ==
- Pantophthalmus argyropastus Bigot, 1880
- Pantophthalmus batesi Austen, 1923
- Pantophthalmus bellardii (Bellardi, 1862)
- Pantophthalmus chuni (Enderlein, 1912)
- Pantophthalmus comptus Enderlein, 1912
- Pantophthalmus engeli (Enderlein, 1931)
- Pantophthalmus facetus (Enderlein, 1931)
- Pantophthalmus frauenfeldi (Schiner, 1868)
- Pantophthalmus kerteszianus (Enderlein, 1914)
- Pantophthalmus pictus (Wiedemann, 1821)
- Pantophthalmus planiventris (Wiedemann, 1821)
- Pantophthalmus punctiger (Enderlein, 1921)
- Pantophthalmus roseni (Enderlein, 1931)
- Pantophthalmus rothschildi (Austen, 1909)
- Pantophthalmus splendidus Austen, 1923
- Pantophthalmus subsignatus (Enderlein, 1931)
- Pantophthalmus tabaninus Thunberg, 1819
- Pantophthalmus vittatus (Wiedemann, 1828)
- Pantophthalmus zoos (Enderlein, 1931)
