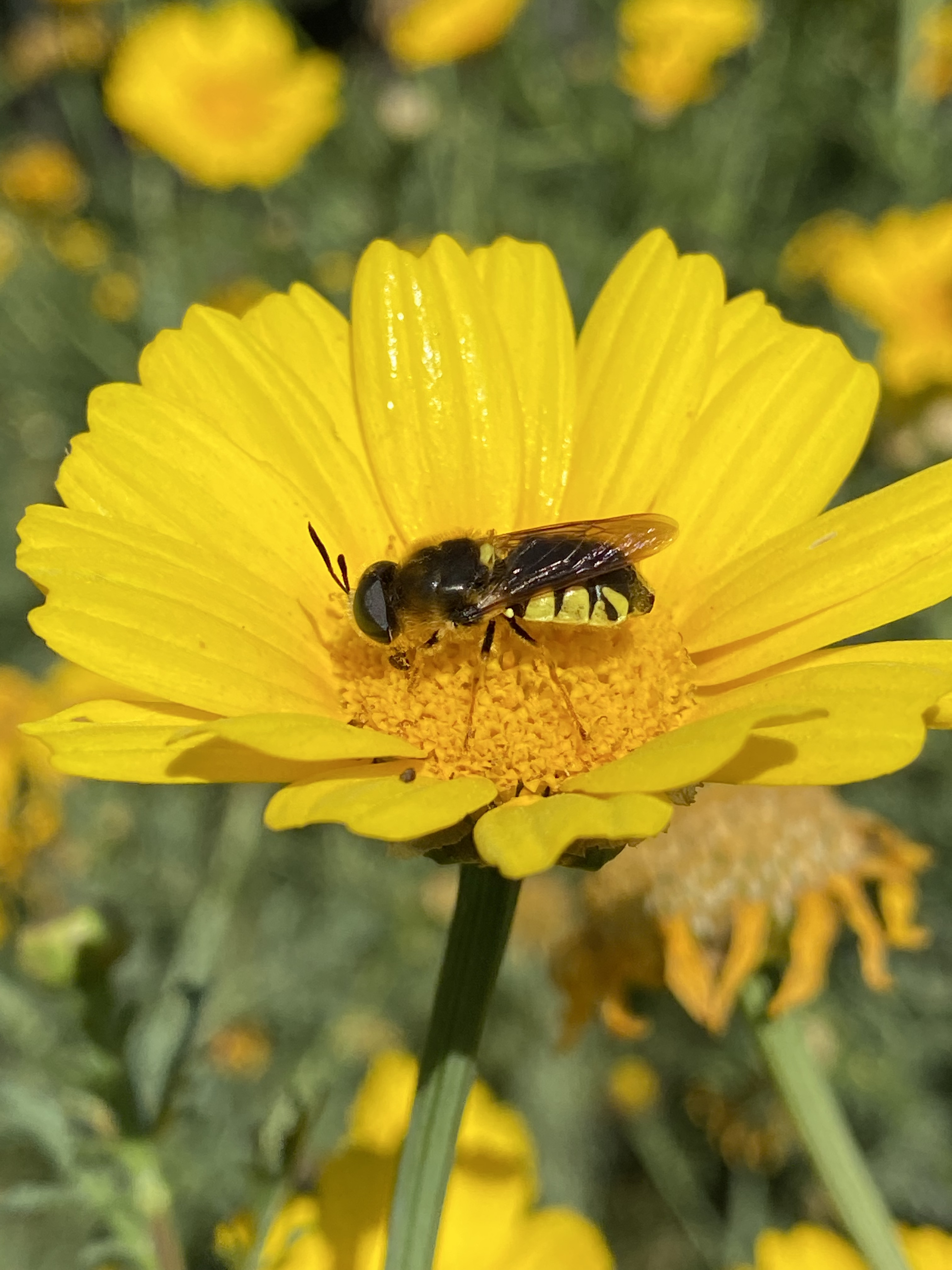

Scientific classification
- Kingdom: Animalia
- Phylum: Arthropoda
- Class: Insecta
- Order: Diptera
- Family: Stratiomyidae
- Subfamily: Stratiomyinae
- Tribe: Stratiomyini
- Genus: Stratiomys
- Species: S. maculosa

Binomial name
- Stratiomys maculosa (Loew, 1866)

Synonyms
- Stratiomyia maculosa Loew, 1866; Stratiomyia insignis Loew, 1872; Stratiomys dentata Bigot, 1879; Stratiomys lacerata Bigot, 1879; Stratiomys lacerta Johnson, 1895

= Stratiomys maculosa =

Species of fly

Stratiomys maculosa is a species of soldier fly in the family Stratiomyidae. Sometimes called the spotted soldier fly, it seeks flowers and riparian habitats. The geographic range of this insect is western North America, including British Columbia, Washington, Oregon, Utah, Idaho, Nevada and California.
