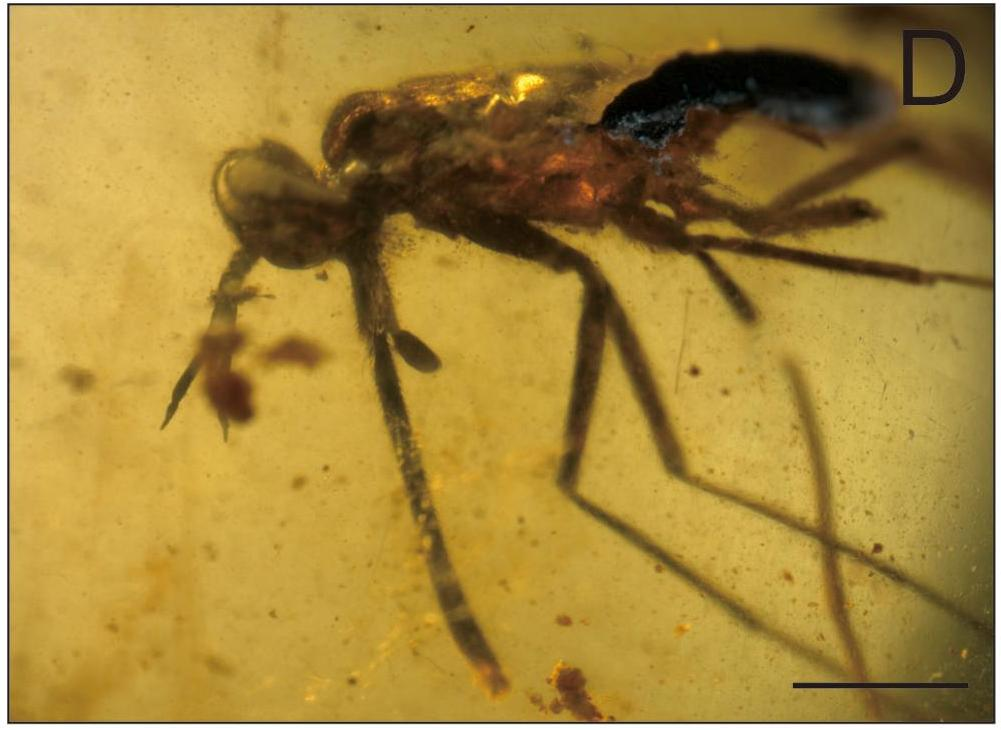
- Zhangsolvid in Burmese amber

Scientific classification
- Domain: Eukaryota
- Kingdom: Animalia
- Phylum: Arthropoda
- Class: Insecta
- Order: Diptera
- Infraorder: Stratiomyomorpha
- Family: †Zhangsolvidae; Nagatomi and Yang 1998

Genera
- See text

Synonyms
- Cratomyiidae Mazzarolo and Amorim 2000

= Zhangsolvidae =

Zhangsolvidae Temporal range: Aptian–Cenomanian

Extinct family of flies

Zhangsolvidae is an extinct family of brachyceran flies known from the Cretaceous period. Members of the family possess a long proboscis, varying in length between 1.3 and 7 mm depending on the species, and were probably nectarivores. A specimen has been found with preserved Bennettitales pollen, suggesting that they acted as pollinators for extinct gymnosperms. They are considered to be members of the Stratiomyomorpha.

== Taxonomy ==
- †Buccinatormyia Arillo, Peñalver and Pérez-de la Fuente in Arillo et al. 2015
  - †Buccinatormyia gangnami Khramov and Nam 2019 Jinju Formation, South Korea, Albian
  - †Buccinatormyia magnifica Arillo, Peñalver and Pérez-de la Fuente in Arillo et al. 2015 Spanish amber, Albian
  - †Buccinatormyia soplaensis Arillo, Peñalver and Pérez-de la Fuente in Arillo et al. 2015 Spanish amber, Albian
- †Burmomyia Zhang and Wang 2019
  - †Burmomyia rossi Zhang and Wang 2019 Burmese amber, Myanmar, Cenomanian
- †Cratomyia Mazzarolo and Amorim 2000
  - †Cratomyia cretacica (Wilkommen 2007) Crato Formation, Brazil, Aptian
  - †Cratomyia macrorrhyncha Mazzarolo and Amorim 2000 Crato Formation, Brazil, Aptian
  - †Cratomyia mimetica Grimaldi 2016 Burmese amber, Myanmar, Cenomanian
  - †Cratomyia zhuoi Zhang and Wang 2019 Burmese amber, Myanmar, Cenomanian
- †Linguatormyia Grimaldi in Arillo et al. 2015
  - †Linguatormyia teletacta Grimaldi in Arillo et al. 2015 Burmese amber, Myanmar, Cenomanian
- †Zhangsolva Nagatomi and Yang 1998
  - †Zhangsolva cupressa (Zhang et al. 1993) Laiyang Formation, China, Aptian
  - †Zhangsolva burmensis Zhang & Zhang, 2021 Burmese amber, Myanmar, Cenomanian
