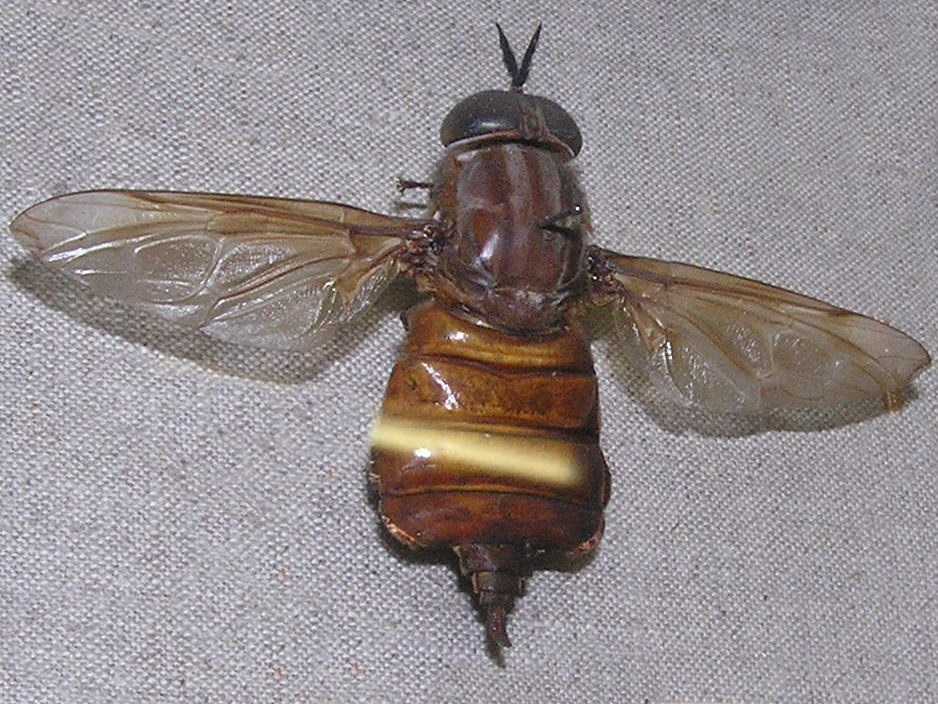
- Pantophthalmus bellardi Zoological Museum St. Petersburg.

Scientific classification
- Kingdom: Animalia
- Phylum: Arthropoda
- Clade: Pancrustacea
- Class: Insecta
- Order: Diptera
- Superfamily: Stratiomyoidea
- Family: Pantophthalmidae; Bigot, 1886

Genera
- Opetiops Enderlein, 1921; Pantophthalmus Thunberg, 1819

= Pantophthalmidae =

Family of flies

Pantophthalmidae (sometimes spelled as Panthophthalmidae) is a small family of very large, robust flies, sometimes referred to as timber flies. There are 21 known species in two genera in the family, all of Neotropical distribution. Superficially they resemble horse flies, but are only distantly related; they are most closely related to the soldier flies (Stratiomyidae). The larvae feed by boring into living wood, an unusual habit for Diptera, and can sometimes be pests. The adult stage is brief and does not feed at all, and most active at dusk.
