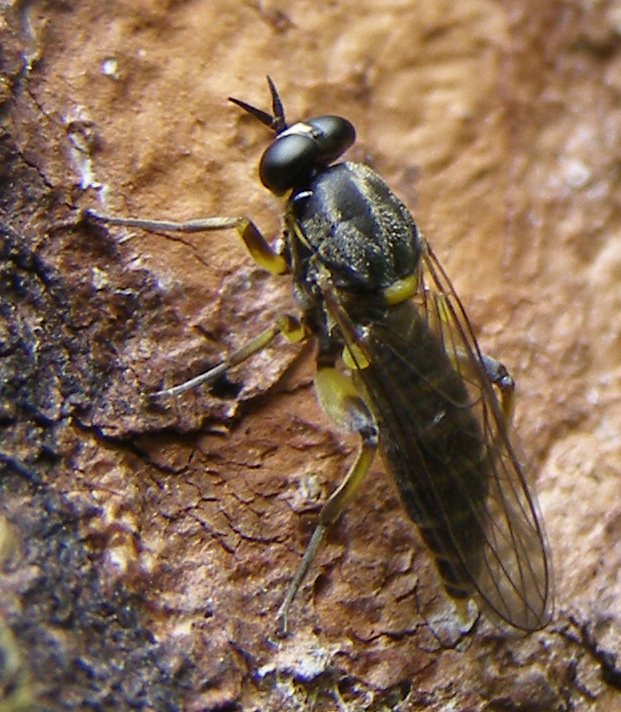
- Solva marginata

Scientific classification
- Kingdom: Animalia
- Phylum: Arthropoda
- Class: Insecta
- Order: Diptera
- Suborder: Brachycera
- Infraorder: Stratiomyomorpha
- Superfamily: Stratiomyoidea
- Family: Xylomyidae de Meijere, 1913

Synonyms
- Solvidae Hendel, 1936; Xylomyiidae Comstock, 1924

= Xylomyidae =

Xylomyidae Temporal range: Barremian–Recent

Family of flies

Xylomyidae is a family of flies known commonly as the wood soldier flies. They are xylophagous and are associated with dead or dying wood.

== Description ==
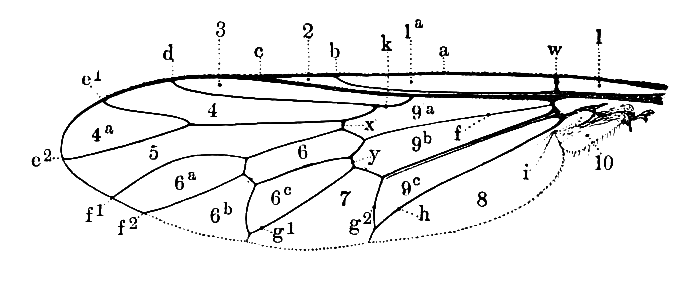
Wing venation of Xylomya maculata

For terms see Morphology of Diptera.

These flies are 4 to 14 millimeters long. Their coloration is variable. They have spurs on the mid and hind tibiae. The antennae are conical.

== Genera ==
As of 2011 there were 138 described species in four genera. These include:

- Arthropeina Lindner, 1949
  - A. fulva Lindner, 1949
- Coenomyiodes Brunetti, 1920
  - C. edwardsi Brunetti, 1920
- Solva Walker, 1859
  - S. dorsiflava Yang & Nagatomi, 1993
  - S. freyi Nagatomi, 1975
  - S. inamoena Walker, 1859
  - S. marginata (Meigen, 1820)
  - S. micholitzi (Enderlein, 1921)
  - S. nigritibialis (Macquart, 1839)
  - S. pallipes (Loew, 1863)
  - S. schnitnikovi Krivosheina, 1972
  - S. varia (Meigen, 1820)
  - S. vittipes Bezzi, 1914
- Xylomya Rondani, 1861
  - X. fasciatus (Say, 1829)
  - X. luteicornis (Frey, 1960)
  - X. maculata (Meigen, 1804)
  - X. simillima Steyskal, 1947
  - X. trinotata (Bigot, 1880)

=== Extinct genera ===
- †Archosolva Grimaldi 2016 Burmese amber, Myanmar, Cenomanian
- †Cretarthropeina Solórzano Kraemer and Cumming 2019 Burmese amber, Myanmar, Cenomanian
- †Cretasolva Grimaldi 2016 Burmese amber, Myanmar, Cenomanian
- †Cretoxyla Grimaldi and Cumming 2011 Lebanese amber, Barremian
- †Pankowskia Solórzano Kraemer and Cumming 2019 Burmese amber, Myanmar, Cenomanian

== Species lists ==
- Palaearctic
- Nearctic
- Australasian/Oceanian
- Japan
- Great Britain

== Phylogeny ==
- Stratiomyomorpha
  - - Xylomyidae subfamily Xylomyinae of Stratiomyidae in older works
    - Stratiomyidae
  - Pantophthalmidae
