= Sylvicola notialis =

Scientific classification
- Domain: Eukaryota
- Kingdom: Animalia
- Phylum: Arthropoda
- Class: Insecta
- Order: Diptera
- Family: Anisopodidae
- Subfamily: Anisopodinae
- Genus: Sylvicola
- Species: S. notialis

Binomial name
- Sylvicola notialis Stone, 1965

Species of fly

Sylvicola notialis is a species of wood gnats, insects in the family Anisopodidae.
