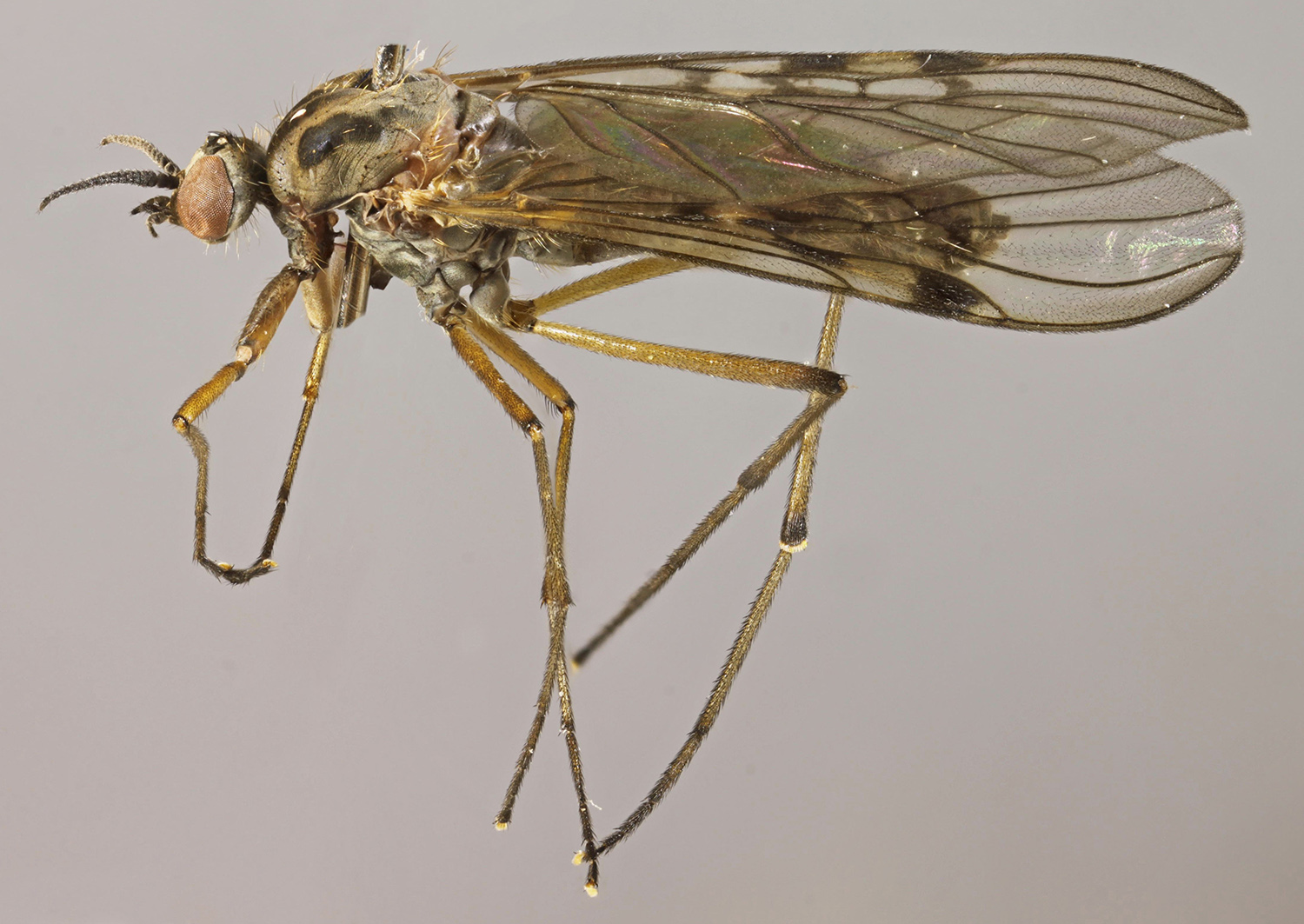
- Sylvicola punctatus North Wales

Scientific classification
- Kingdom: Animalia
- Phylum: Arthropoda
- Class: Insecta
- Order: Diptera
- Family: Anisopodidae
- Subfamily: Anisopodinae
- Genus: Sylvicola
- Species: S. punctatus

Binomial name
- Sylvicola punctatus (Fabricius, 1787)

= Sylvicola punctatus =

Species of fly

Sylvicola punctatus is a species of fly in the family Anisopodidae. It is found in the Palearctic.
