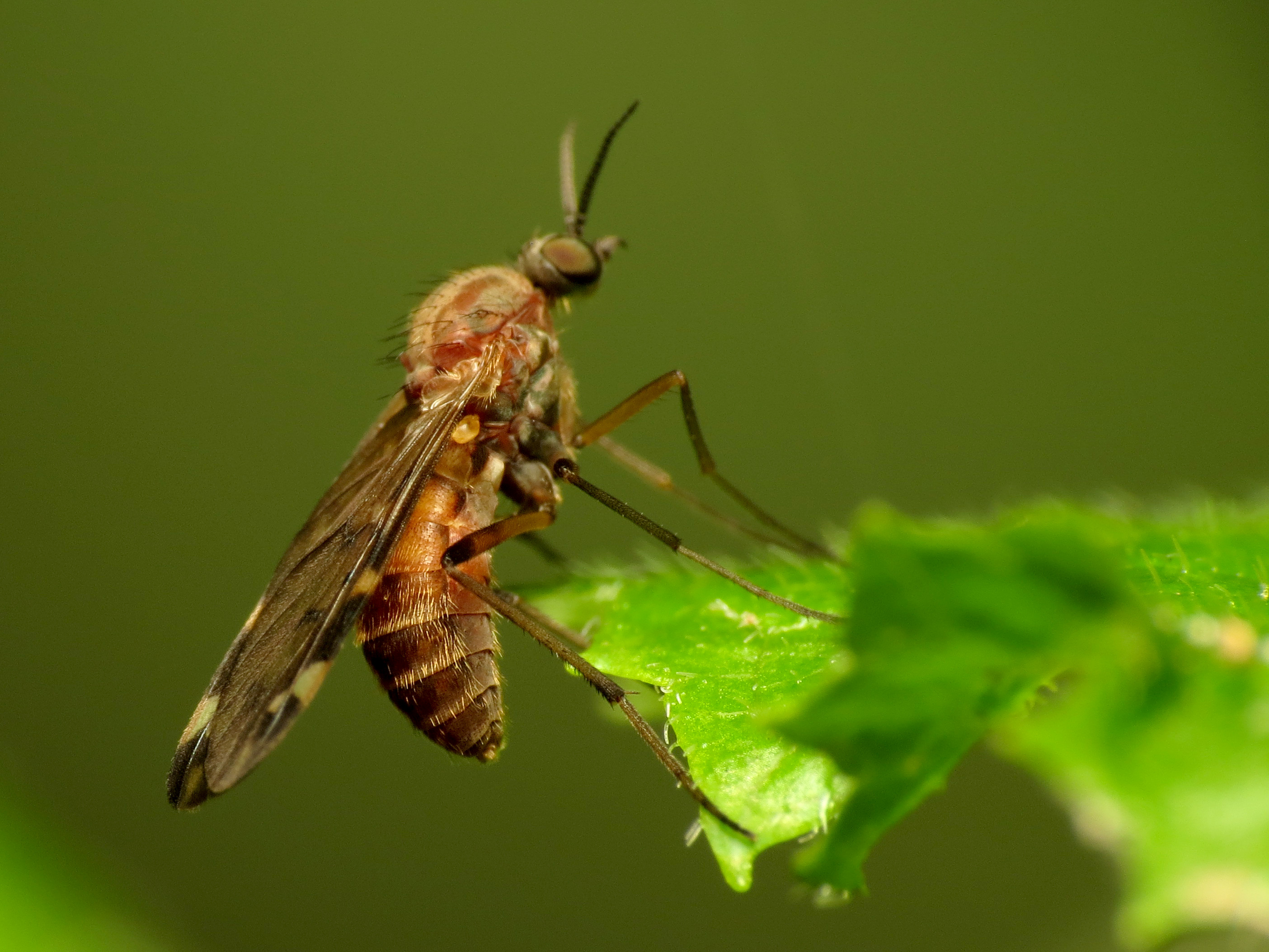

Scientific classification
- Domain: Eukaryota
- Kingdom: Animalia
- Phylum: Arthropoda
- Class: Insecta
- Order: Diptera
- Family: Anisopodidae
- Genus: Sylvicola
- Species: S. alternatus

Binomial name
- Sylvicola alternatus (Say, 1823)

Synonyms
- Rhyphus alternatus Say, 1823

= Sylvicola alternatus =

Species of fly

Sylvicola alternatus is a species of wood gnat in the family Anisopodidae. It is found in states between Wisconsin and Maine and between Texas and Georgia.
