= Mycetobia divergens =

Scientific classification
- Domain: Eukaryota
- Kingdom: Animalia
- Phylum: Arthropoda
- Class: Insecta
- Order: Diptera
- Family: Anisopodidae
- Genus: Mycetobia
- Species: M. divergens

Binomial name
- Mycetobia divergens Walker, 1856

Synonyms
- Mycetobia marginalis Adams, 1903; Mycetobia sordida Packard, 1869; Mycetophila persica Riley, 1867

Species of fly

Mycetobia divergens is a species of wood gnat in the family Anisopodidae.
