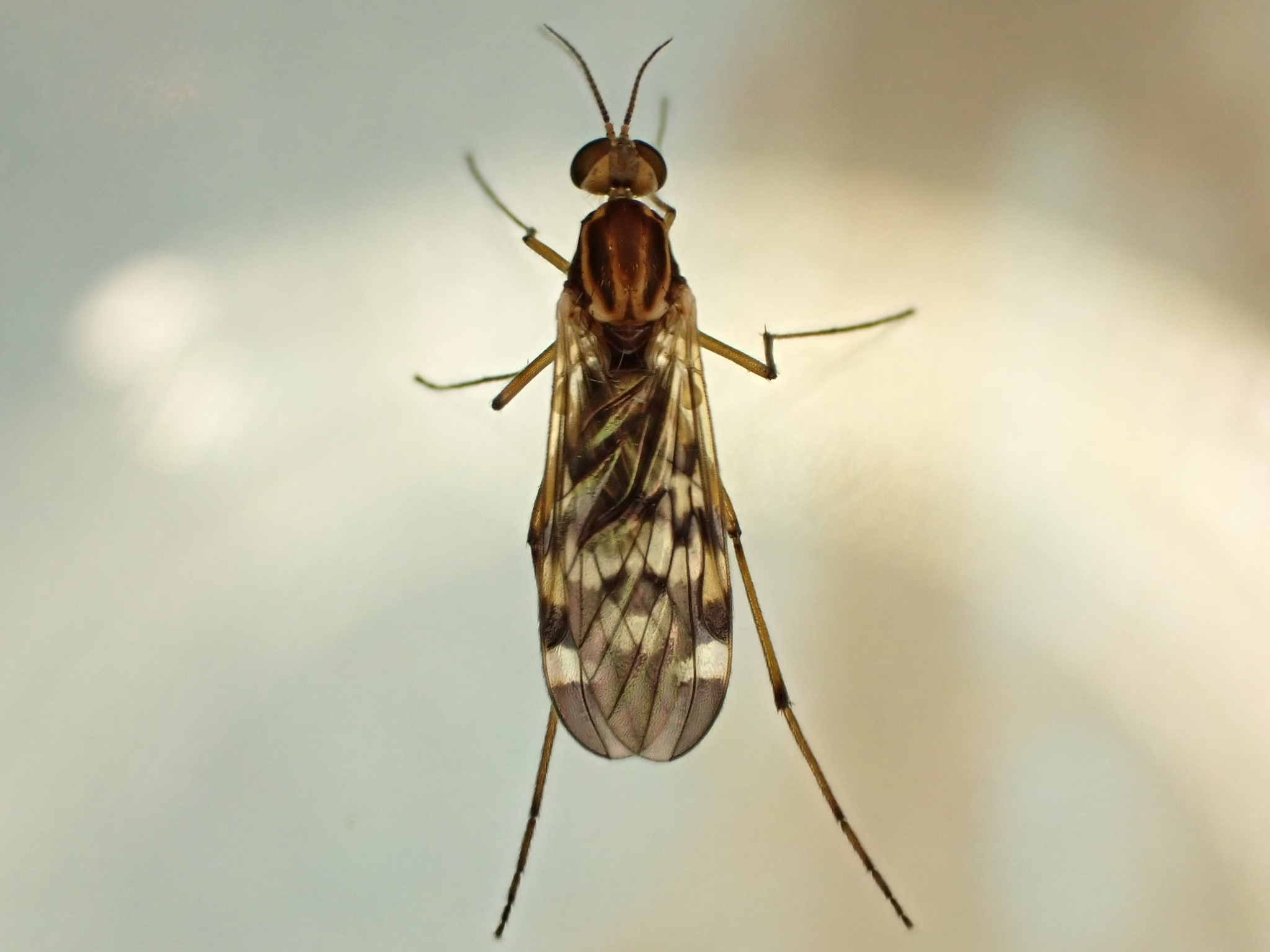

Scientific classification
- Kingdom: Animalia
- Phylum: Arthropoda
- Class: Insecta
- Order: Diptera
- Family: Anisopodidae
- Genus: Sylvicola
- Species: S. notatus

Binomial name
- Sylvicola notatus (Hutton, 1902)

Synonyms
- Rhyphus notatus Hutton 1902

= Sylvicola notatus =

Species of wood gnats

Sylvicola notatus, also known by the common name outhouse fly, is a species of wood gnat in the family Sylvicola. It is endemic to New Zealand.

== Taxonomy ==
The species was first described by Frederick Hutton in 1902, who named the species Rhyphus notatus.

== Description ==
Hutton described the species as follows:

Reddish-tawny, the flagellum of the antennas dark-brown. Thorax with five brown stripes, the middle one shorter than the lateral pair; scutellum and metanotum brown. Tips of the femora and tibiae brown. Halteres pale-yellowish. Wings pale brownish; the pterostigma and the tip, from the discal cell outwards, darkish-brown. A distinct round white spot in the submarginal cell, and another, touching it, in the first posterior cell. A brown spot in the anterior basal cell, and another on the chief cross-vein. Posterior cross-vein bordered with brown. Veins brown.

The species body is 6 millimetres long, with a wing length of 6 millimetres.

== Distribution ==
The species is found widely across New Zealand.

== Gallery ==
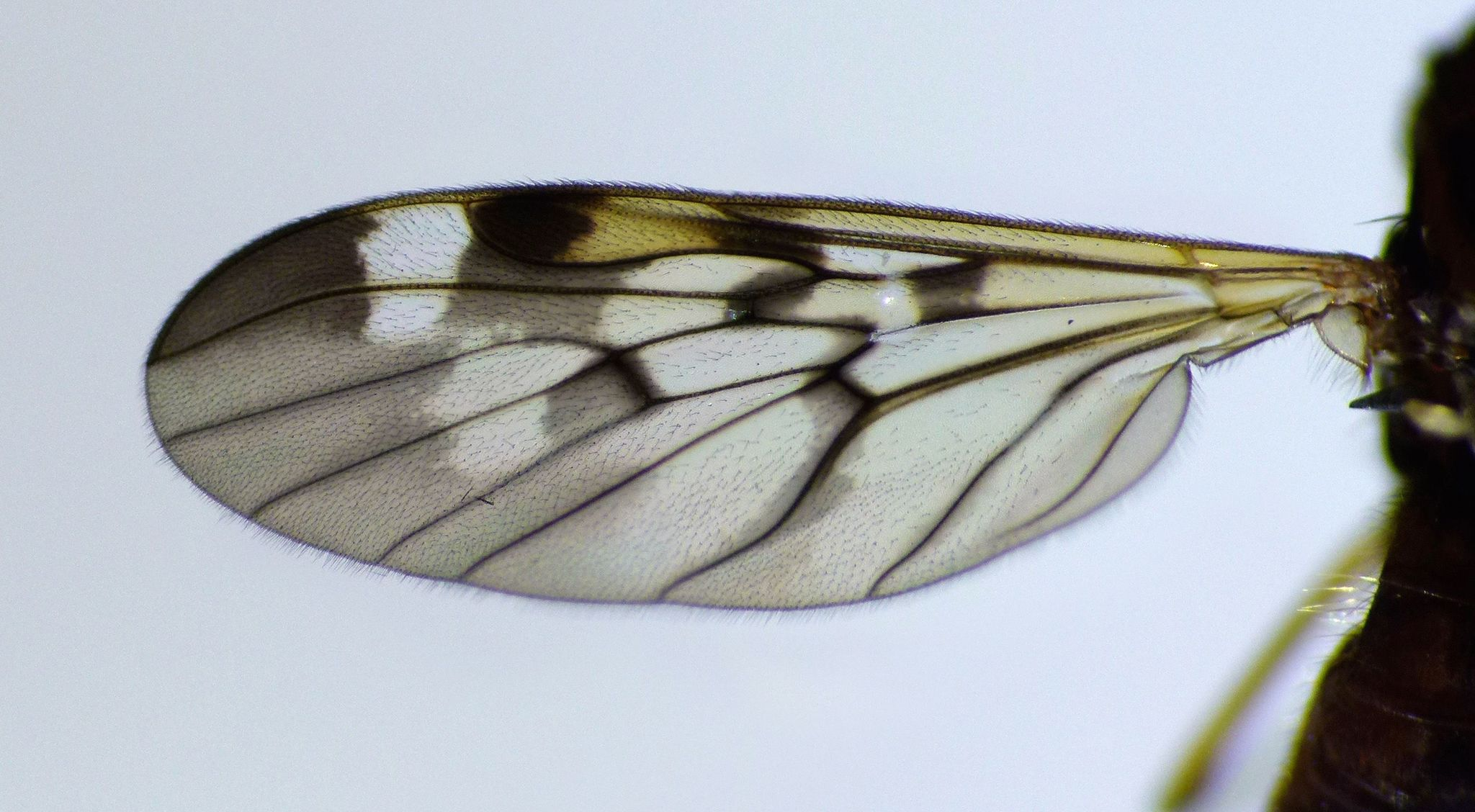
Close-up of the wing

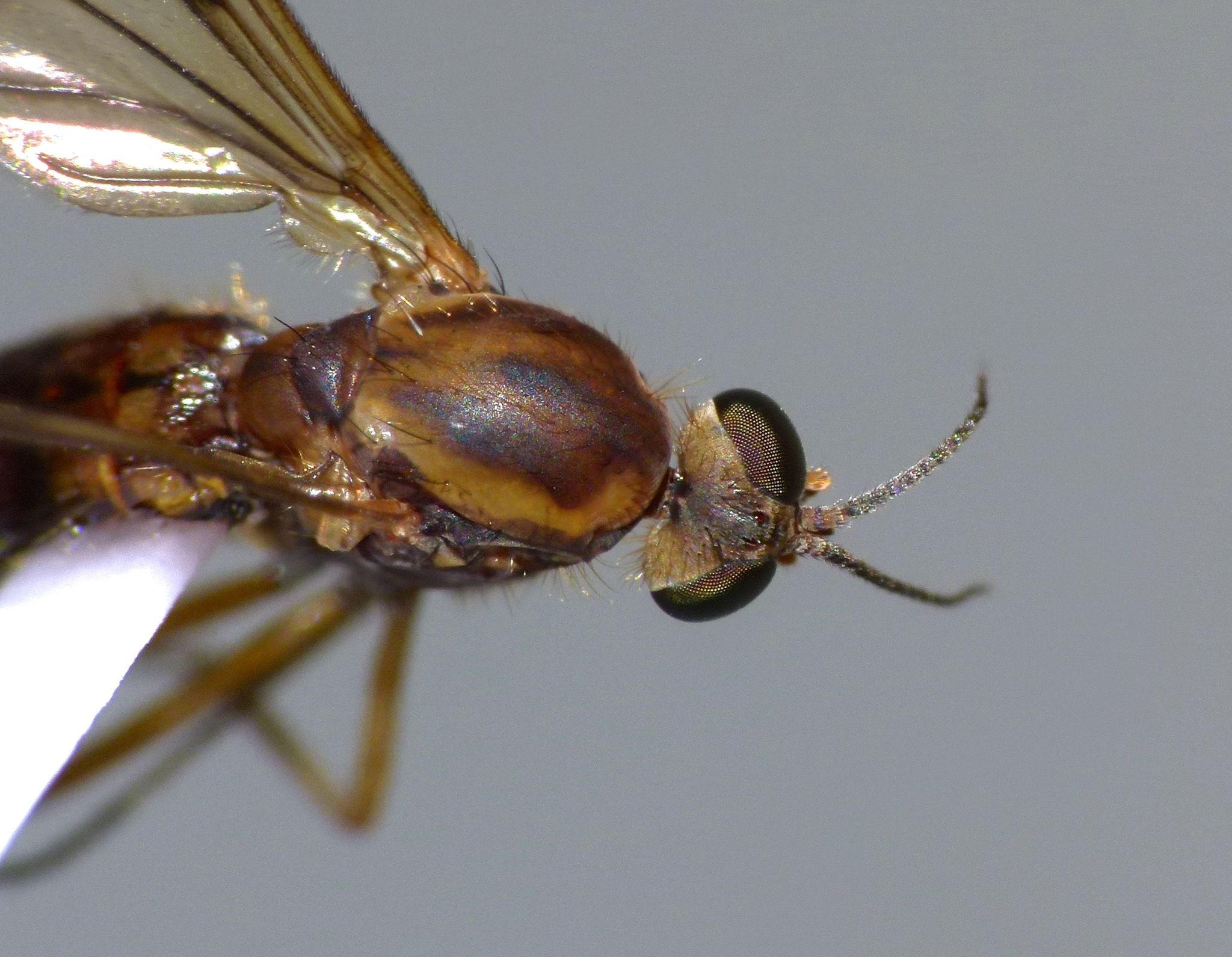
Close-up of the body
