= Sylvicola fuscatus =

Scientific classification
- Kingdom: Animalia
- Phylum: Arthropoda
- Class: Insecta
- Order: Diptera
- Family: Anisopodidae
- Genus: Sylvicola
- Species: S. fuscatus

Binomial name
- Sylvicola fuscatus (Fabricius, 1775)

Synonyms
- Tipula fuscata Fabricius, 1775

Species of fly

Sylvicola fuscatus is a species of wood gnats, insects in the family Anisopodidae.
