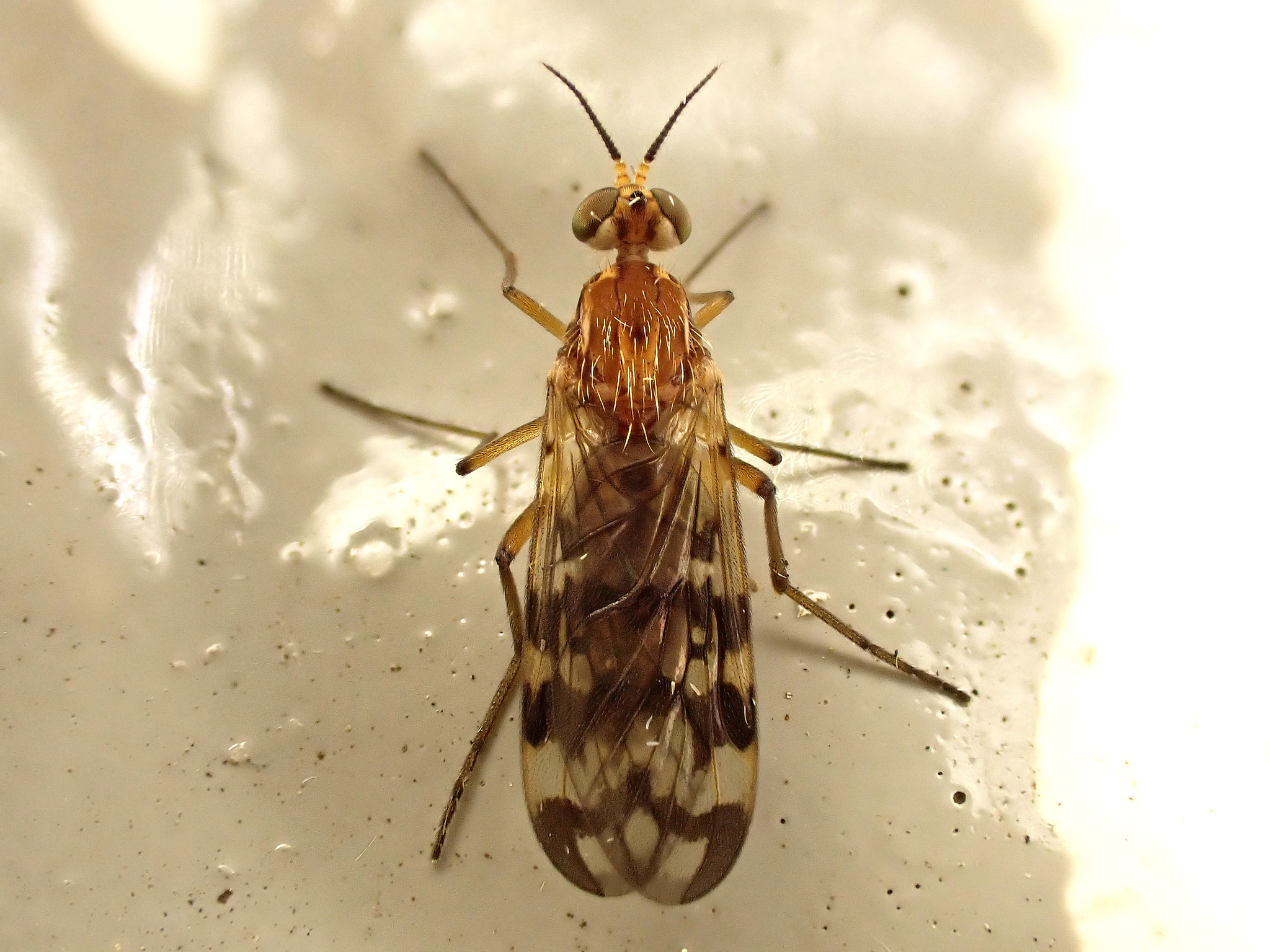
- Sylvicola dubius in West Auckland, New Zealand

Scientific classification
- Kingdom: Animalia
- Phylum: Arthropoda
- Clade: Pancrustacea
- Class: Insecta
- Order: Diptera
- Family: Anisopodidae
- Genus: Sylvicola
- Species: S. dubius

Binomial name
- Sylvicola dubius (Macquart, 1850)

Synonyms
- Chrysopyla dubius Macquart, 1850; Rhyphus brevis Walker, 1856

= Sylvicola dubius =

Species of wood gnats

Sylvicola dubius is a species of wood gnat in the genus Sylvicola. The species is predominantly found in southeastern Australia, but can also be found in New Zealand, southwestern Australia and East Timor.

== Taxonomy ==
The species was first described by French entomologist Pierre-Justin-Marie Macquart in 1850, who named the species Chrysopyla dubius.

== Behaviour ==
The species is known to thrive on fallen apples.

== Distribution ==
The species is found in south-eastern Australia, south-western Australia, Tasmania, Lord Howe Island, New Zealand and in East Timor.

== Gallery ==
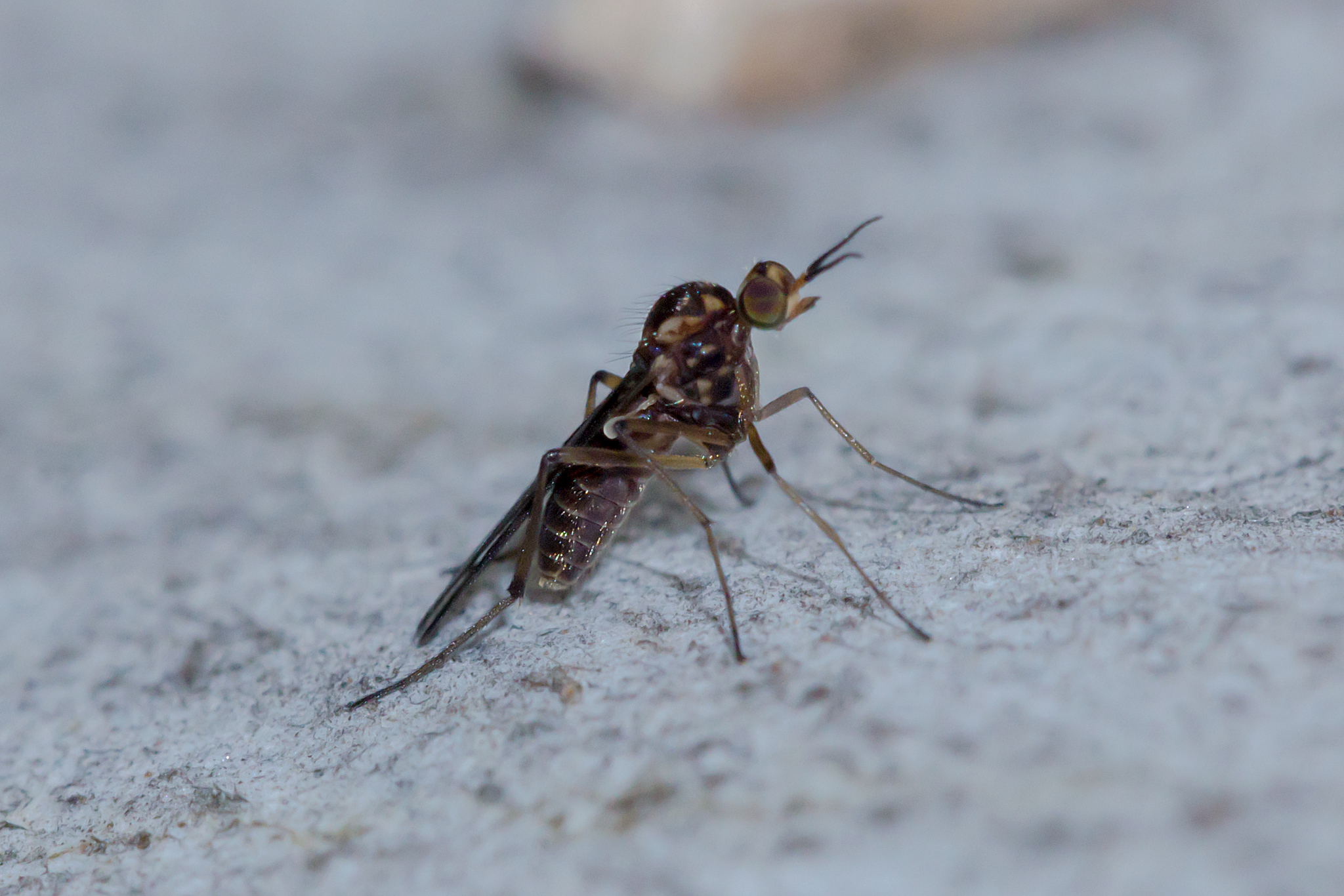
Side view of a Sylvicola dubius seen in Melbourne, Australia

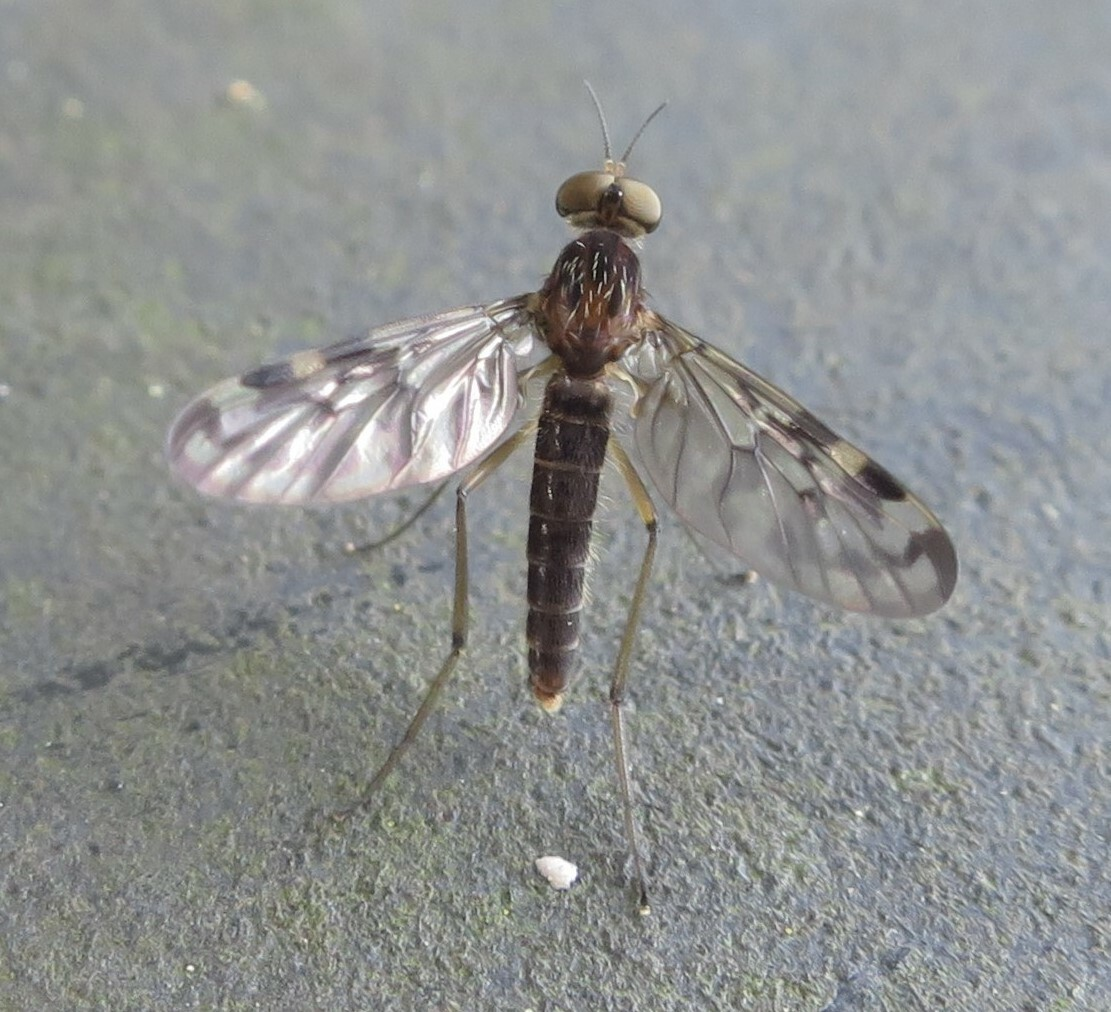
Sylvicola dubius with spread wings in Rotorua, New Zealand

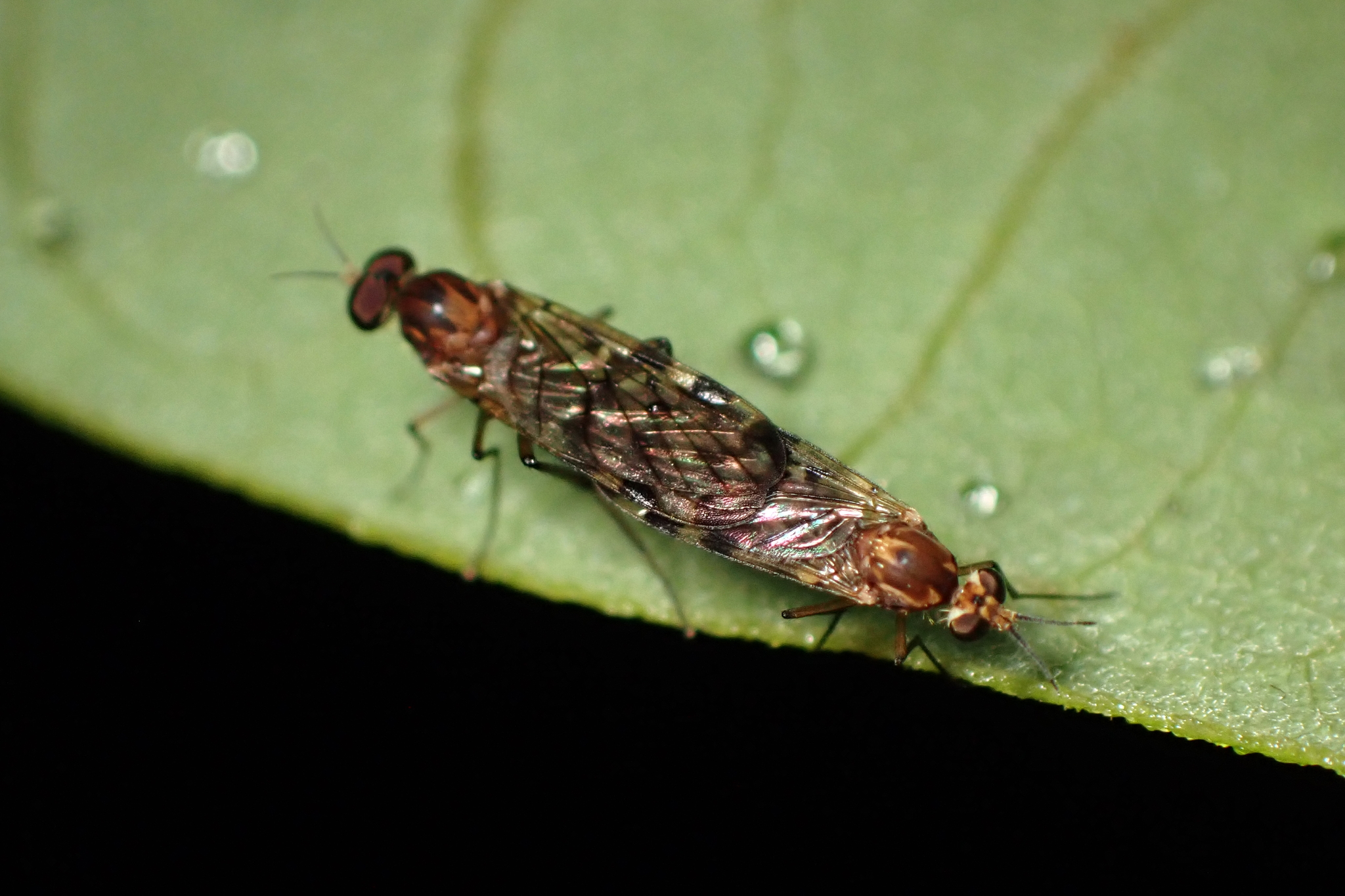
Mating Sylvicola dubius in West Auckland, New Zealand

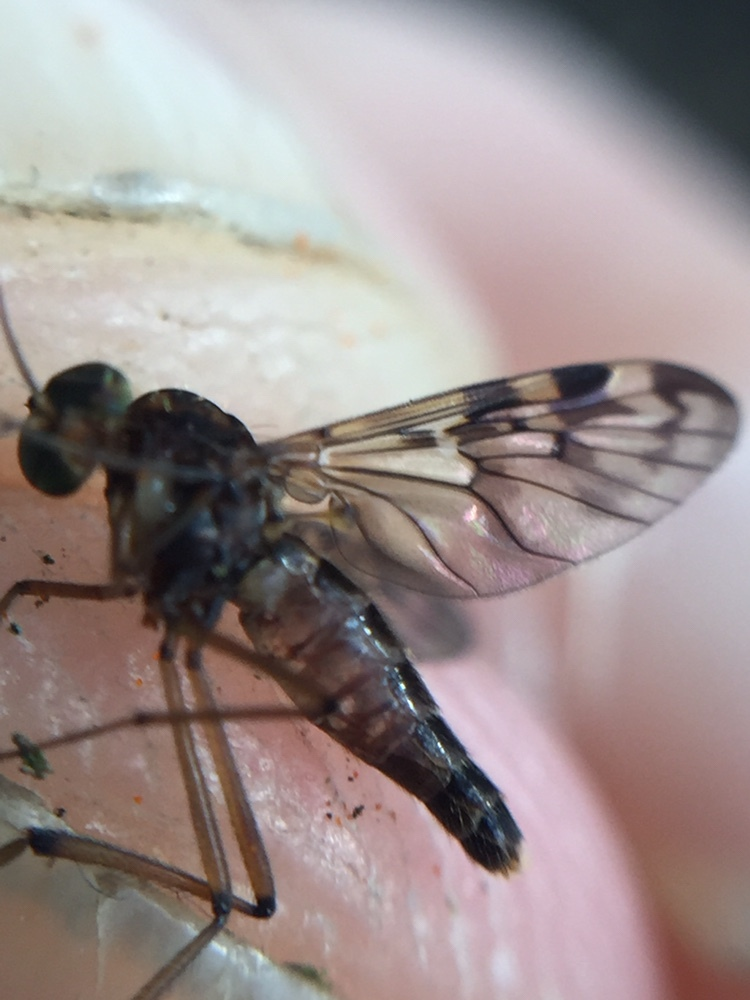
Exposed abdomen of Sylvicola dubius in Auckland, New Zealand

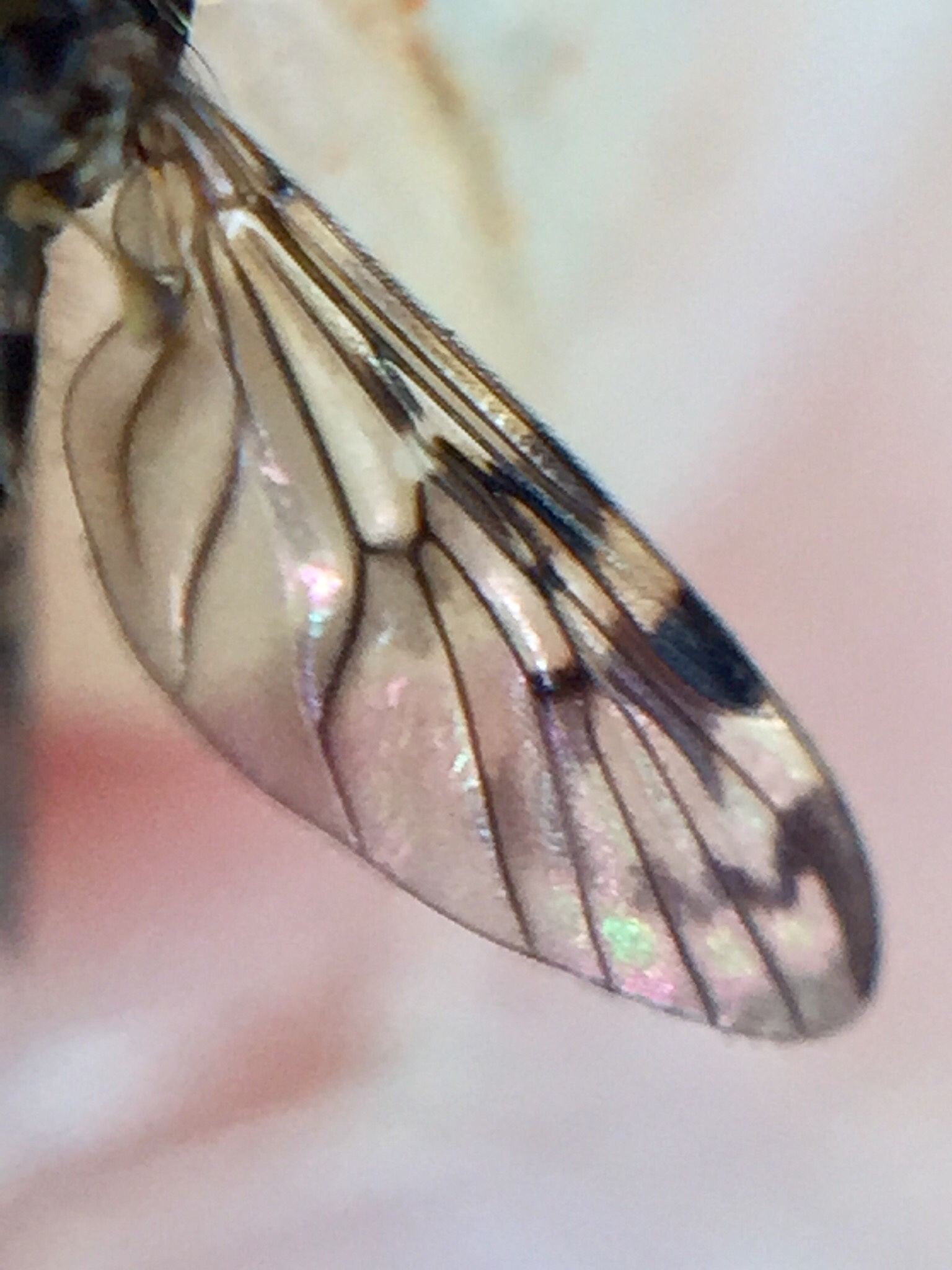
Close-up of wing pattern of a Sylvicola dubius in Auckland, New Zealand
