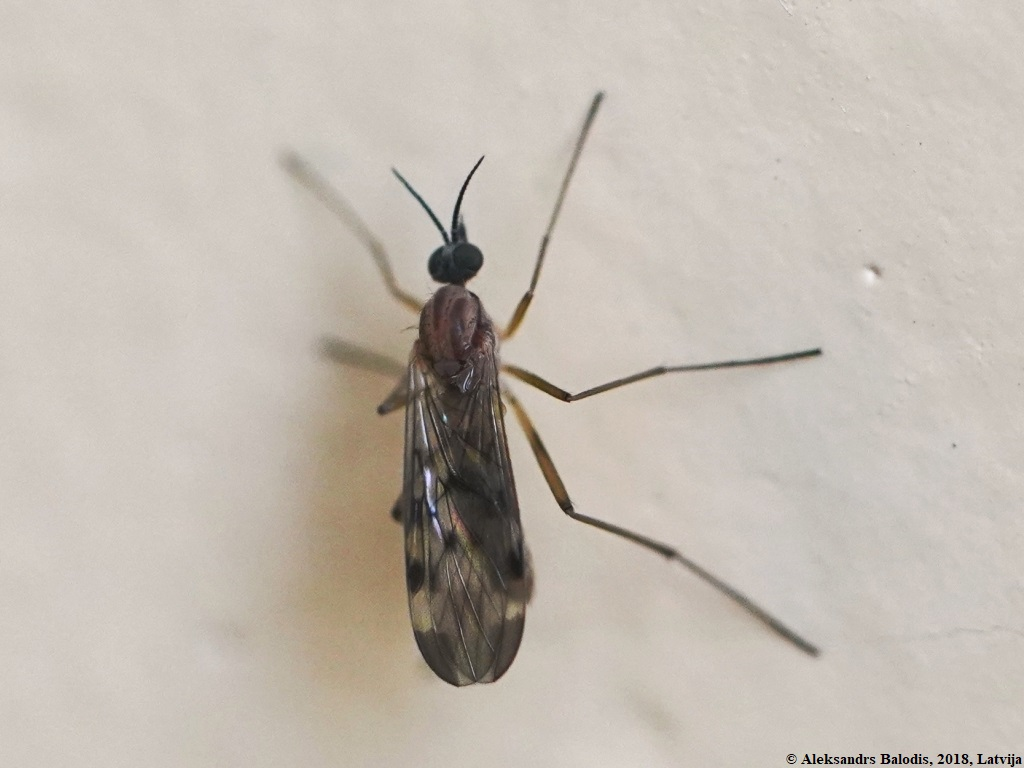

Scientific classification
- Kingdom: Animalia
- Phylum: Arthropoda
- Clade: Pancrustacea
- Class: Insecta
- Order: Diptera
- Family: Anisopodidae
- Subfamily: Anisopodinae
- Genus: Sylvicola
- Species: S. fenestralis

Binomial name
- Sylvicola fenestralis (Scopoli, 1763)

= Sylvicola fenestralis =

Species of fly

Sylvicola fenestralis, the window gnat, is a medium gnat (6–10 mm) of the family Anisopodidae. It is found in the Palearctic and inhabits filters of sewage treatment works. Sylvicola fenestralis larvae has been reduced by up to 98% in biological filters by the microbial insecticide Bacillus thuringiensis var. israelensis.

== Description ==
As adults, Sylvicola fenestralis are stout-bodied, long-legged Nematoceran flies. Their wings are long and narrow, with dark spots occurring from the subcostal to the medial cells. The anal cells are open.

Sylvicola fenestralis possesses a hypoproct that is as wide as it is high with distinctively posterior emargination occurring behind the median pubescent lobes. The hypoproct of the female extends posteromedially and the genital fork lacks median sclerotized rods. The gonostyle is narrow.

The surface of the ommatidium of the species displays distinctive "anastomosing and bifurcating ridges" in a cerebral cortex-like pattern.

== Taxonomy ==
Sylvicola fenestralis was first described in 1763 by Giovanni Antonio Scopoli as Tipula fenestralis.

Additional invalid names or synonyms for the species include:

- Sylvicola diversipes (Fitch 1923)
- Anisopus nebulosus (Meigen, 1804)
- Rhyphus infuscatus (Macquart, 1834)
- Sylvicola brevis (Harris, 1780)
- Sylvicola diversipes (Edwards, 1923; Finch 1923, Fitch 1923)

== Distribution and habitat ==
Sylvicola fenestralis range widely across Europe; from Ireland to north-west Russia. Adult flies of Anisopodidae are often found in forest habitats on decaying organic materials, or in and around house gardens and windows.

== Life ==
Sylvicola fenestralis possesses four larval instars. Larval S. fenestralis are beneficial grazers. It is not until adulthood that these flies become nuisances, although they do not bite. S. fenestralis typically become nuisances in biological filters in the Spring and Summer.
