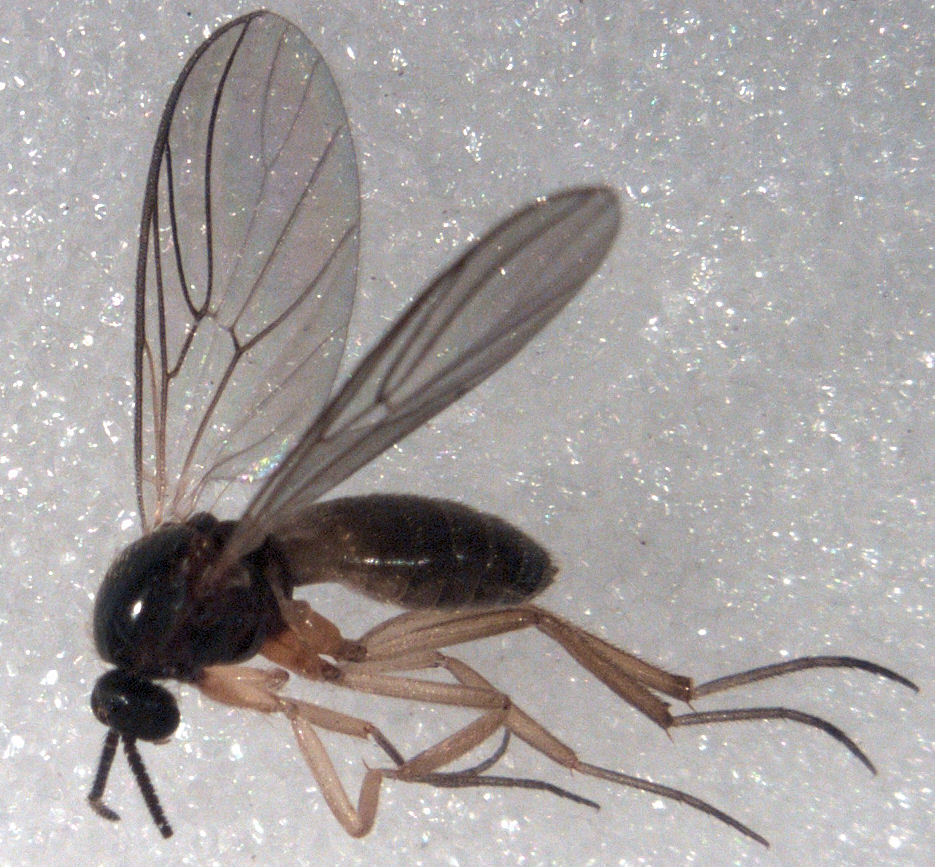

Scientific classification
- Domain: Eukaryota
- Kingdom: Animalia
- Phylum: Arthropoda
- Class: Insecta
- Order: Diptera
- Family: Anisopodidae
- Subfamily: Mycetobiinae
- Genus: Mycetobia; Meigen, 1818

= Mycetobia =

Genus of flies

Mycetobia is a genus of wood gnats in the family Anisopodidae. There are more than 20 described species in Mycetobia.

== Species ==
These 28 species belong to the genus Mycetobia:

- Mycetobia asiatica Mamaev, 1987
- Mycetobia bicolor Mamaev, 1971
- Mycetobia divergens Walker, 1856
- Mycetobia formosana Papp, 2007
- Mycetobia fulva Philippi, 1865
- Mycetobia gemella Mamaev, 1968
- Mycetobia kunashirensis Mamaev, 1987
- Mycetobia limanda Stone, 1966
- Mycetobia morula Mamaev, 1987
- Mycetobia neocaledonica Baylac & Matile, 1988
- Mycetobia notabilis Mamaev, 1968
- Mycetobia obscura Mamaev, 1968
- Mycetobia pacifica Mamaev, 1987
- Mycetobia pallipes Meigen, 1818
- Mycetobia pilosa Mamaev, 1968
- Mycetobia pseudogemella Mamaev, 1987
- Mycetobia scutellaris Baylac & Matile, 1988
- Mycetobia seguyi Baylac & Matile, 1990
- Mycetobia stonei Lane & Andretta, 1958
- Mycetobia thoracica Guerin-Meneville, 1835
- Mycetobia tibialis Mamaev, 1987
- Mycetobia turkmenica Mamaev, 1987
- Mycetobia ulmicola Mamaev, 1971
- Mycetobia xylogena Mamaev, 1987
- †Mycetobia connexa Meunier, 1899
- †Mycetobia longipennis Meunier, 1899
- †Mycetobia platyuroides Meunier, 1899
