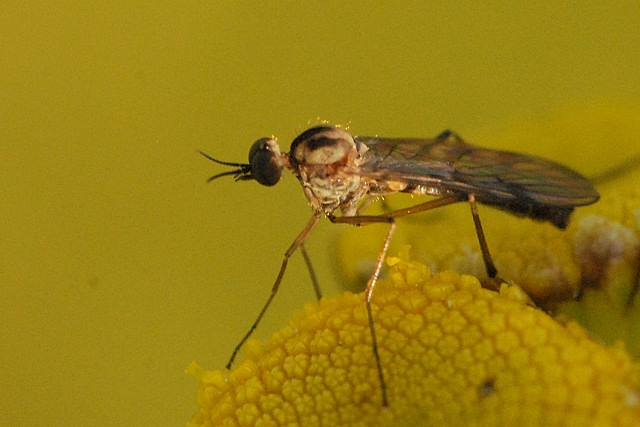

Scientific classification
- Domain: Eukaryota
- Kingdom: Animalia
- Phylum: Arthropoda
- Class: Insecta
- Order: Diptera
- Family: Anisopodidae
- Subfamily: Anisopodinae
- Genus: Sylvicola; Harris, 1780

Synonyms
- Anisopus Meigen, 1803

= Sylvicola =

Genus of flies

Sylvicola is a genus of wood gnats in the family Anisopodidae. There are more than 80 described species in Sylvicola.

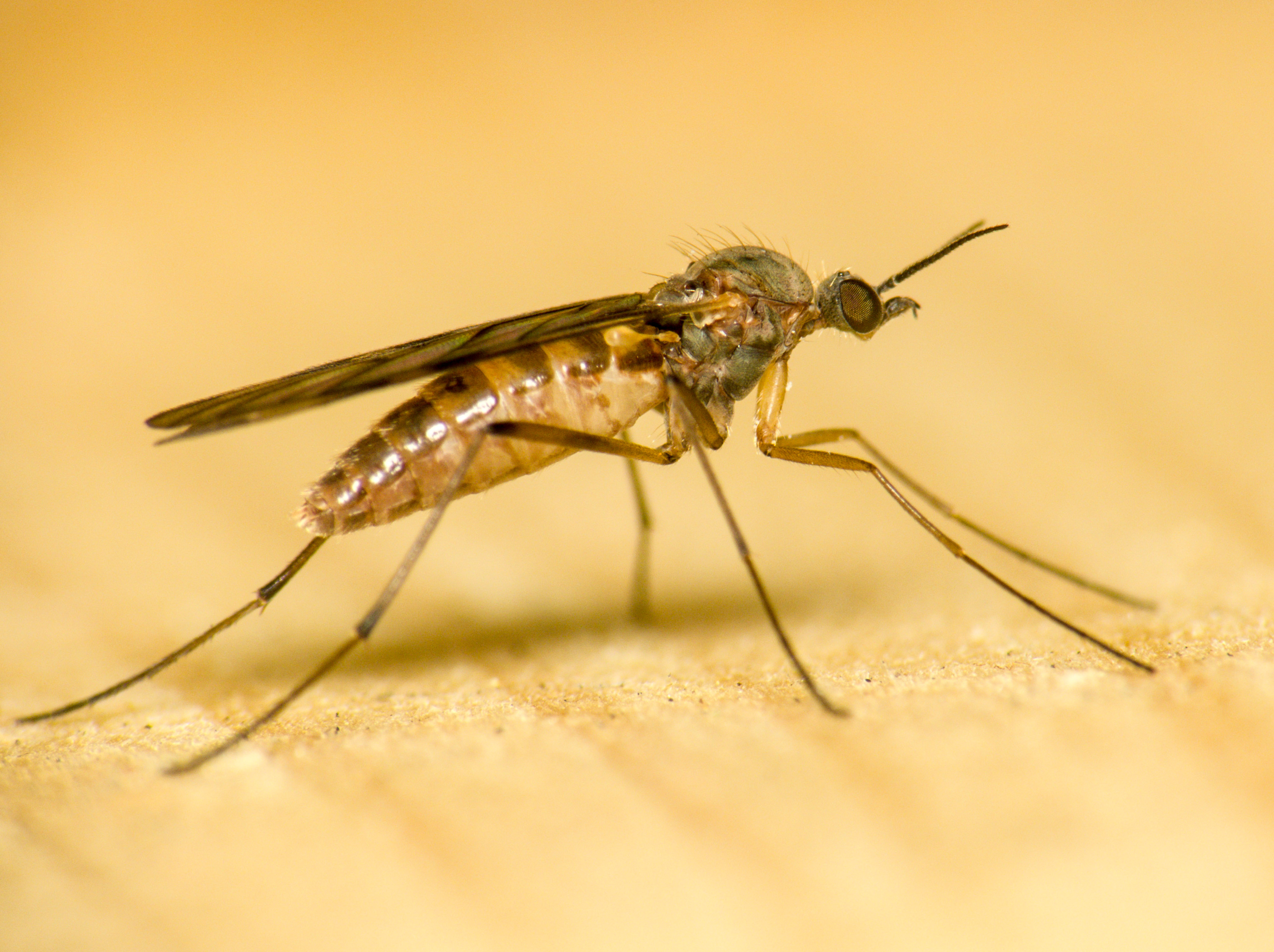

== Species ==
These 89 species belong to the genus Sylvicola:

- Sylvicola adornatus Yang & Cui, 1998
- Sylvicola albiapex (Lane & d'Adretta, 1958)
- Sylvicola albicornis (Edwards, 1923)
- Sylvicola alternatus (Say, 1823)
- Sylvicola andinus (Edwards, 1930)
- Sylvicola annulicornis (Edwards, 1928)
- Sylvicola annuliferus (Edwards, 1923)
- Sylvicola annulipes (Edwards, 1919)
- Sylvicola apicatus (Edwards, 1919)
- Sylvicola argentinus (Edwards, 1928)
- Sylvicola ater (Edwards, 1919)
- Sylvicola baechlii Haenni, 1997
- Sylvicola bivittatus (Edwards, 1933)
- Sylvicola boraceae (Lane & Andretta, 1958)
- Sylvicola borneanus (Edwards, 1933)
- Sylvicola brunneus (Vanschuytbroeck, 1965)
- Sylvicola caiuasi (Lane & Andretta, 1958)
- Sylvicola cinctus (Fabricius, 1787)
- Sylvicola distinctus (Brunetti, 1911)
- Sylvicola divisus (Brunetti, 1911)
- Sylvicola dolorosus (Williston, 1896)
- Sylvicola dubius (Macquart, 1850)
- Sylvicola fasciatus (Roeder, 1886)
- Sylvicola fenestralis (Scopoli, 1763) (window gnat)
- Sylvicola festivus (Edwards, 1928)
- Sylvicola fluminensis (Lane & Andretta, 1958)
- Sylvicola foveatus (Edwards, 1923)
- Sylvicola fulvithorax (Meijere, 1924)
- Sylvicola funebris (Fuller, 1935)
- Sylvicola funereus (Tollet, 1956)
- Sylvicola fuscatoides Michelsen, 1999
- Sylvicola fuscatus (Fabricius, 1775)
- Sylvicola fuscipennis (Macquart, 1838)
- Sylvicola glabrifrons (Edwards, 1932)
- Sylvicola grandis (Lane & Andretta, 1958)
- Sylvicola guttatus (Schiner, )[4]
- Sylvicola hellwigi Meijere, 1913
- Sylvicola hyalinus (Lane & Andretta, 1958)
- Sylvicola incasicus (Lane & Andretta, 1958)
- Sylvicola indicus (Brunetti, 1911)
- Sylvicola indivisus (Edwards, 1923)
- Sylvicola infumatus (Knab, 1912)
- Sylvicola integratus (Edwards, 1933)
- Sylvicola japonicus (Matsumura, 1915)
- Sylvicola javanensis (Edwards, 1923)
- Sylvicola konakovi Krivosheina, 2001
- Sylvicola limpida (Edwards, 1923)
- Sylvicola luteatus (Edwards, 1923)
- Sylvicola maculipennis (Wulp, 1885)
- Sylvicola malayensis (Edwards, 1923)
- Sylvicola marginatus (Say, 1823)
- Sylvicola marmoratus (Edwards, 1923)
- Sylvicola matsumurai (Okada, 1935)
- Sylvicola monachus (Harris, 1780)
- Sylvicola neozelandicus (Schiner, )[4]
- Sylvicola nigroclavatus (Edwards, 1928)
- Sylvicola notatus (Hutton, 1902)
- Sylvicola notialis Stone, 1965
- Sylvicola nubilipennis (Tollet, 1956)
- Sylvicola oceana (Frey, 1949)
- Sylvicola ornatus (Edwards, 1923)
- Sylvicola pauperatus (Edwards, 1923)
- Sylvicola philippinus (Edwards, 1929)
- Sylvicola picturatus (Knab, 1912)
- Sylvicola pulchricornis (Brunetti, 1911)
- Sylvicola punctatus (Fabricius, 1787)
- Sylvicola quadrivittatus (Edwards, 1928)
- Sylvicola reconditus (Harris, 1780)
- Sylvicola secretus (Harris, 1780)
- Sylvicola separatus (Edwards, 1923)
- Sylvicola stackelbergi Krivosheina & Menzel, 1998
- Sylvicola suzukii (Matsumura, 1916)
- Sylvicola tibialis (Edwards, 1923)
- Sylvicola tucumanus (Lane & Andretta, 1958)
- Sylvicola undulatus (Lamb, 1909)
- Sylvicola varipes (Curran, 1934)
- Sylvicola violovitshi Krivosheina, 2001
- Sylvicola withycombei (Edwards, 1923)
- Sylvicola wygodzinskyi (Lane & Andretta, 1958)
- Sylvicola zetterstedi (Edwards, 1923)
- Sylvicola zetterstedti (Edwards, 1923)
- Sylvicola zhejianganus Yang & Cui, 1998
- † Anisopus carolae (Lewis, 1969)
- † Asarcomyia cadaver (Scudder, 1890)
- † Rhyphus hooleyi (Cockerell, 1921)
- † Rhyphus maculatus (Heer, 1849)
- † Rhyphus priscus (Brodie, 1845)
- † Rhyphus splendidus (Meunier, 1904)
- † Rhyphus thirionus (Meunier, 1904)
