= Gnat =

Any of many species of tiny flying insects in the dipterid suborder Nematocera

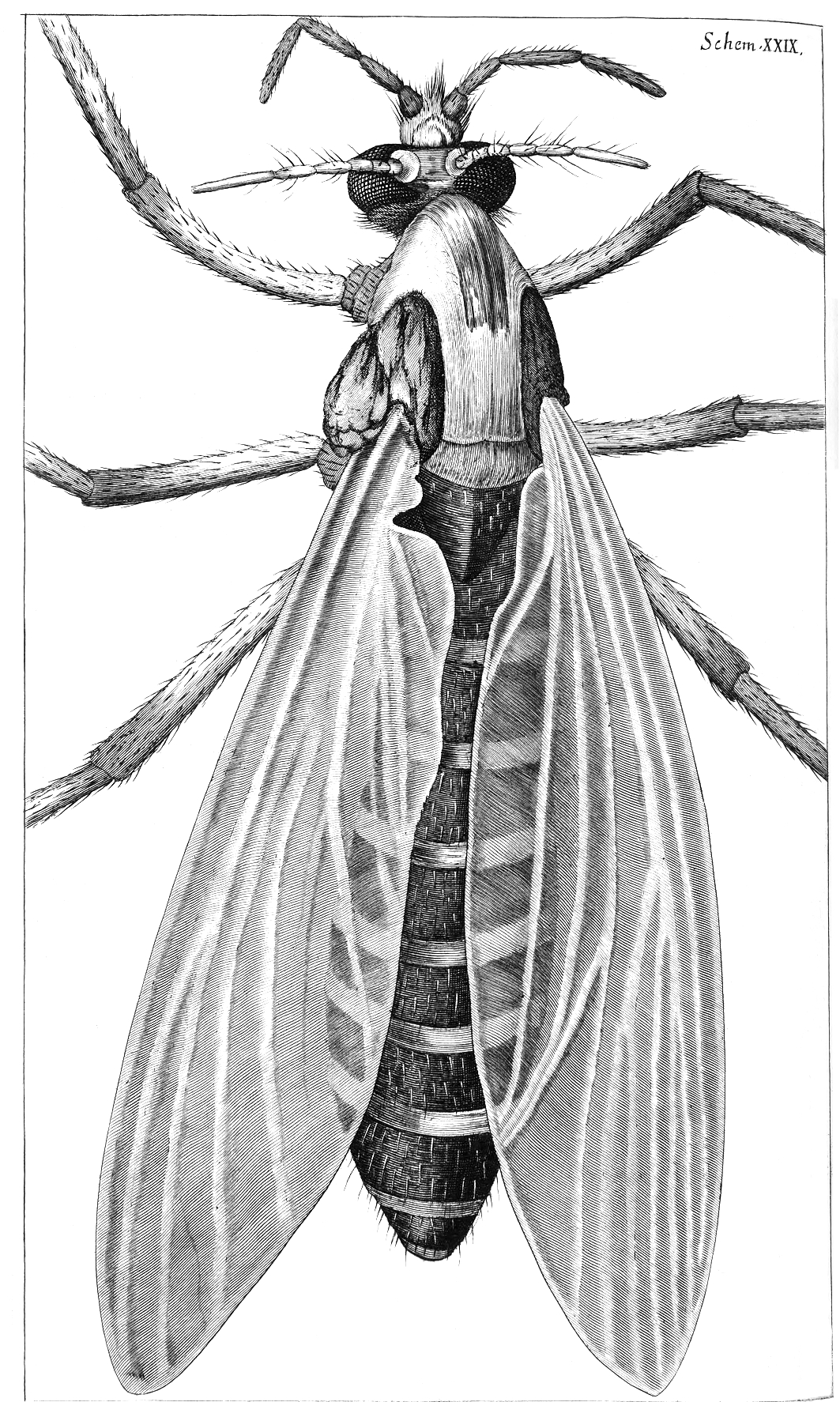
Gnat from Robert Hooke's Micrographia, 1665

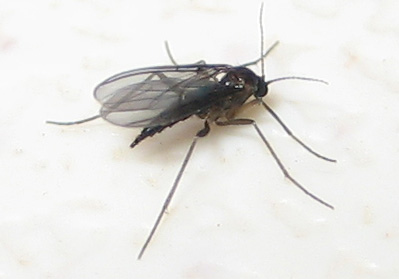
A female black fungus gnat

A gnat (/ˈnæt/) (also knat) is any of many species of tiny flying insects in the dipterid suborder Nematocera, especially those in the families Mycetophilidae, Anisopodidae and Sciaridae. Most often they fly in large numbers, called clouds. "Gnat" is a loose descriptive category rather than a phylogenetic or other technical term, so there is no scientific consensus on what constitutes a gnat. Some entomologists consider only non-biting flies to be gnats. Certain universities and institutes also distinguish eye gnats: the Smithsonian Institution describes them as "non-biting flies, no bigger than a few grains of salt, ... attracted to fluids secreted by your eyes".

== Description ==
As nematoceran flies, adult gnats have antennae with at least six segments that are often long and slender. They are generally slender-bodied with long and narrow wings.

Black fly (Simuliidae) and biting midges (Ceratopogonidae), also belonging to the gnat category, are small, sometimes barely visible, blood-sucking flies commonly known in many areas as biting gnats, sand flies, punkies or "no-see-ums", among other names.

== Life cycle ==
In general, gnats go through the four life stages of egg, larva, pupa and adult, similar to other flies.

The fungus gnats lay their eggs in moist organic debris or soil, which hatch into larvae. The larvae feed on organic matter such as leaf mold, mulch, compost, grass clippings, root hairs and fungi. They eventually become pupae and then adults emerge from the pupae. At a temperature of 75 °F (23.9 °C), the cycle takes approximately 17 days: 3 days as eggs, 10 days as larvae and 4 days as pupae. Warmer temperatures allow more rapid development. Some species of fungus gnats (e.g. those in genus Bradysia) are pests of mushrooms and roots of plants in greenhouses.

Other gnats begin their lives as eggs laid in masses in water, or laid on aquatic plants. The aquatic larvae dwell in ponds, pools, water-filled containers, clogged rain gutters or wet soil, which generally feed on plant matter (living or dead). The larvae develop into pupae and then into adults. Adults live only long enough to reproduce and they may form large mating swarms, often around dusk. The life cycle generally takes 4–5 weeks.

The larvae of most gall gnats (Cecidomyiidae), such as the Hessian fly larva, form galls in flowers, leaves, stems, roots or other plant parts.

== Pollination ==
Some South American pleurothallid orchids are pollinated by tiny gnats and have correspondingly small flowers.

== Control ==
Adult non-biting gnats do not damage plants but are considered a nuisance. Usually, larvae do not cause serious plant damage, but when present in large numbers can stunt the plant growth and damage its roots. To prevent gnats from spreading, measures have to be taken to target immature stages of development of the species. Physical tactics include eliminating favorable living conditions: reduction of excess moisture, drainage of pools with standing water, and removal of decaying organic matter. Commercially available control agents and insecticides can be used as a control measure, but are not recommended for use in a household. To control adult gnats in smaller areas, pressurized aerosol sprays with pyrethrins can be used. Other control measures in the household can include turning off unnecessary lights at dusk and sealing vents and other openings.

== See also ==
- Black fly
- Enicocephalidae (gnat bugs)
- Cecidomyiidae (gall gnats)
- Sciaridae (dark-winged fungus gnats)
- Ceratopogonidae
- Midge
- Mosquito
- Sandfly
