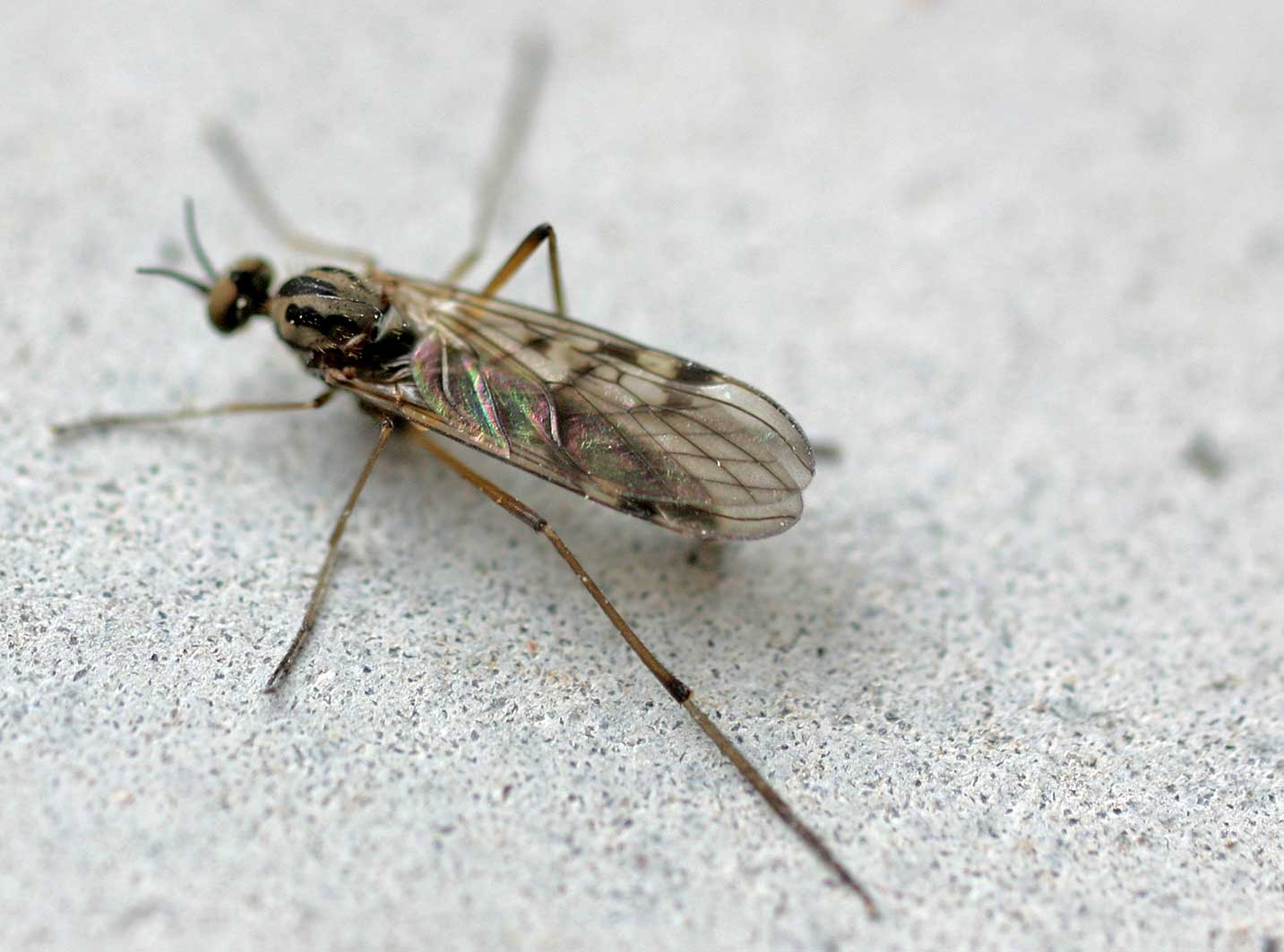
- Sylvicola fenestralis

Scientific classification
- Kingdom: Animalia
- Phylum: Arthropoda
- Clade: Pancrustacea
- Class: Insecta
- Order: Diptera
- Suborder: Nematocera
- Infraorder: Bibionomorpha
- Superfamily: Anisopodoidea
- Family: Anisopodidae; Knab, 1912

Genera
- Carreraia; Cretoseguya (extinct); Eoanisopodites (extinct); Hongocaloneura (extinct); Huaxiarhyphus; Lobogaster; Megarhyphus; Mesobrachyopteryx (extinct); Mesorhyphus; Mesochria; Mycetobia; Olbiogaster; Pachyrhyphus; Sinorhyphus; Sylvicola; Thiras; Valeseguya

Synonyms
- Phryneidae; Rhyphidae; Sylvicolidae

= Anisopodidae =

Anisopodidae Temporal range: Early Jurassic–Recent

Family of flies

The Anisopodidae are a small cosmopolitan family of gnat-like flies known as wood gnats or window-gnats, with 154 described extant species in 15 genera, and several described fossil taxa. Some species are saprophagous or fungivorous. They are mostly small to medium-sized flies, except the genera Olbiogaster and Lobogaster, which are large with spatulated abdomens. Their phylogenetic placement is controversial. They have been proposed to be the sister group to the higher flies, the Brachycera. Some authors consider this group to be four distinct families – Anisopodidae, Mycetobiidae, Olbiogastridae, and Valeseguyidae.

Sylvicola wing veins

Mycetobia wing veins

== Description ==
Authors disagree on the circumscription of this taxon. Published accounts differ.

The Anisopodidae are small or medium-sized (mostly 4–12 mm, Lobogaster found in Chile 17–18 mm) yellowish to brownish gnats with long, thin legs. The tibiae have apical spurs. The head is small and rounded and with small mouthparts. The eyes are dichoptic or holoptic. Ocelli are present and form an equilateral triangle. The slender antennae vary from relatively short to longer than head and thorax together. The antennae have 14-16 segments. The mesonotum is without a transverse suture; the wing is wide, with a clear anal lobe and a pattern of smaller markings (sometimes hyaline). The alula is strongly differentiated in Olbiogaster and Sylvicola. Both wings lie flat over the abdomen in the resting position. A pterostigma is present or absent, and the wing membrane is densely covered with microtrichia (macrotrichia present in Sylvicola). The costa (C) ends at or just beyond the tip of R4+5. The subcosta (Sc) ends in the costa near the middle of wing and distal to base of Rs. The stem of R is straight (sometimes with an interruption or weakening below crossvein h). Rs arises near but proximal to the middle of the wing, with two branches. R4+5 is long, ending near tip of wing; crossvein r-m is situated near or distal to the fork of Rs. Radial vein 2+3 (R2+3) may end in R1 or end in the costa. The median vein (M) has three or two branches and the discal cell (d) is present or absent. CuA2 is straight or sinuous distally. CuA1, CuA2, and A1 all reach the wing margin. CuP when present is variably distinct; A2 is present but weak apically. The abdomen is slender.

== Identification ==
- Online-Keys: The Palaearctic species of Sylvicola
- Coe, R.L., Freeman, P., & Mattingly, P.F. (1950) Diptera: Nematocera, families Tipulidae to Chironomidae. Royal Entomological Society of London Handbook 9(2)ii. pdf
- Shtakel'berg, A.A. Family Anisopodidae (Rhyphidae, Phryneidae) in Bei-Bienko, G. Ya, 1988 Keys to the insects of the European Part of the USSR Volume 5 (Diptera) Part 2 English edition. Keys to Palaearctic species but now needs revision.
- Séguy, E. (1940) Diptères: Nématocères. Paris: Éditions Faune de France.Bibliothèque virtuelle numérique

== Species lists ==
- West Palaearctic including Russia
- Australasian/Oceanian
- Nearctic
- Japan
- World list
