= Eleusis (disambiguation) =

Eleusis is a town in Greece.

Eleusis may also refer to:

- Eleusis (beetle), a genus of unmargined rove beetles
- Eleusis (Boeotia), a town of ancient Boeotia
- Eleusis (card game), an inductive logic card game
- Eleusis (mythology), mythological eponym of the town Eleusis
- Eleusis (pharmaceutical company), pharmaceutical company dealing in psychedelic medicine
- Eleusis (Thera), a town of ancient Thera (Santorini)
- Eleusis (organization), Polish abstinence organization founded by Wincenty Lutosławski
