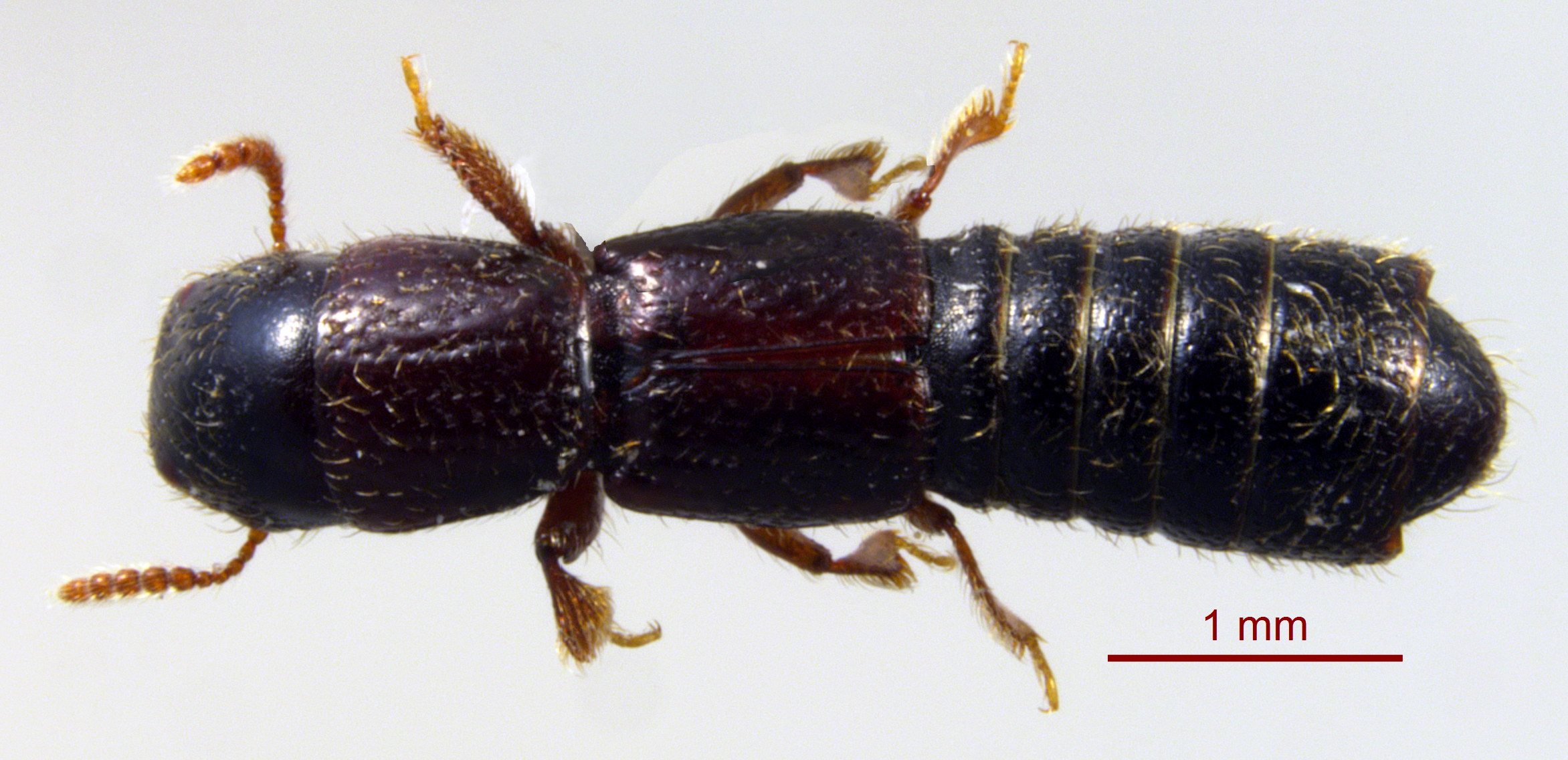
- Osorius latipes

Scientific classification
- Kingdom: Animalia
- Phylum: Arthropoda
- Clade: Pancrustacea
- Class: Insecta
- Order: Coleoptera
- Suborder: Polyphaga
- Infraorder: Staphyliniformia
- Family: Staphylinidae
- Subfamily: Osoriinae; Erichson, 1839

Genera
- see text

= Osoriinae =

Subfamily of beetles

The Osoriinae are a subfamily of beetles in the family Staphylinidae, the rove beetles. They are found mainly in tropical and subtropical regions.

== Description ==
The abdomen is flattened and has parallel sides. A suture along each side or the abdomen may be made up of fused plates.

== Biology ==
Little is known about the biology of this subfamily. Species may be found in leaf litter, under bark, or in ant nests. They are detritivores and fungivores.

== Systematics ==
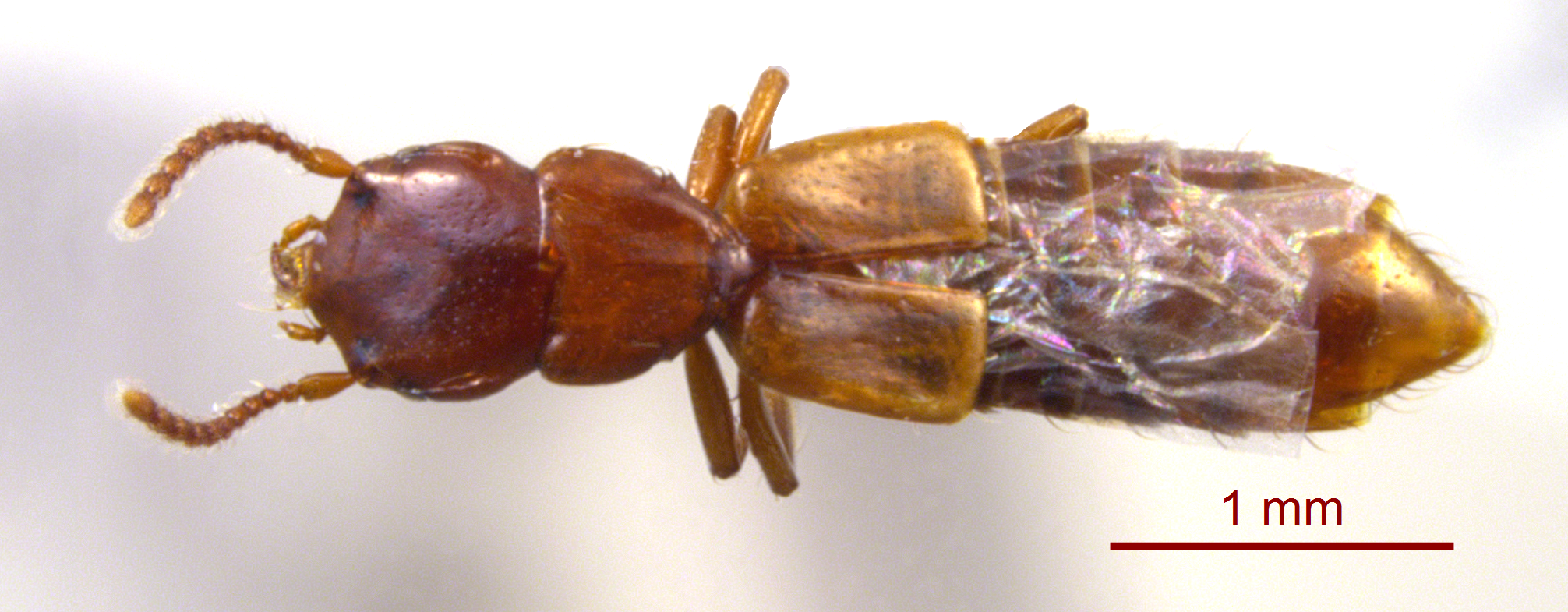
Eleusis pallida

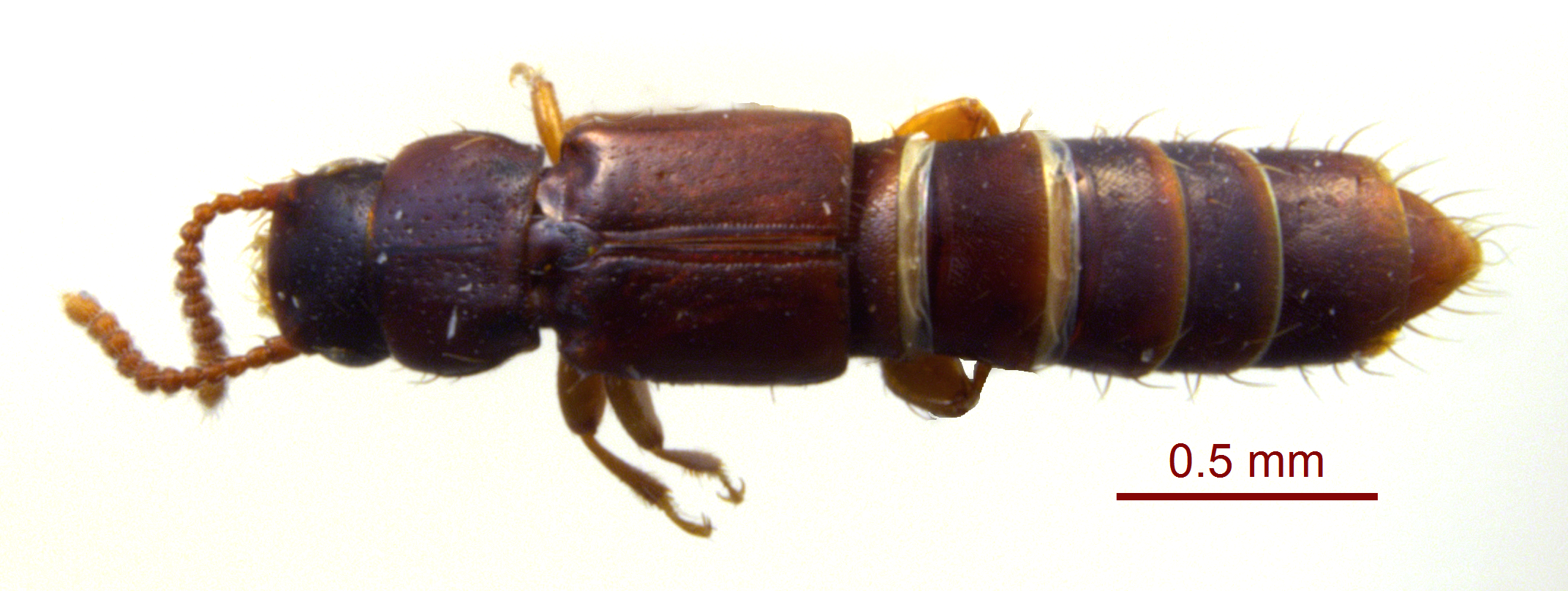
Nacaeus tenuis

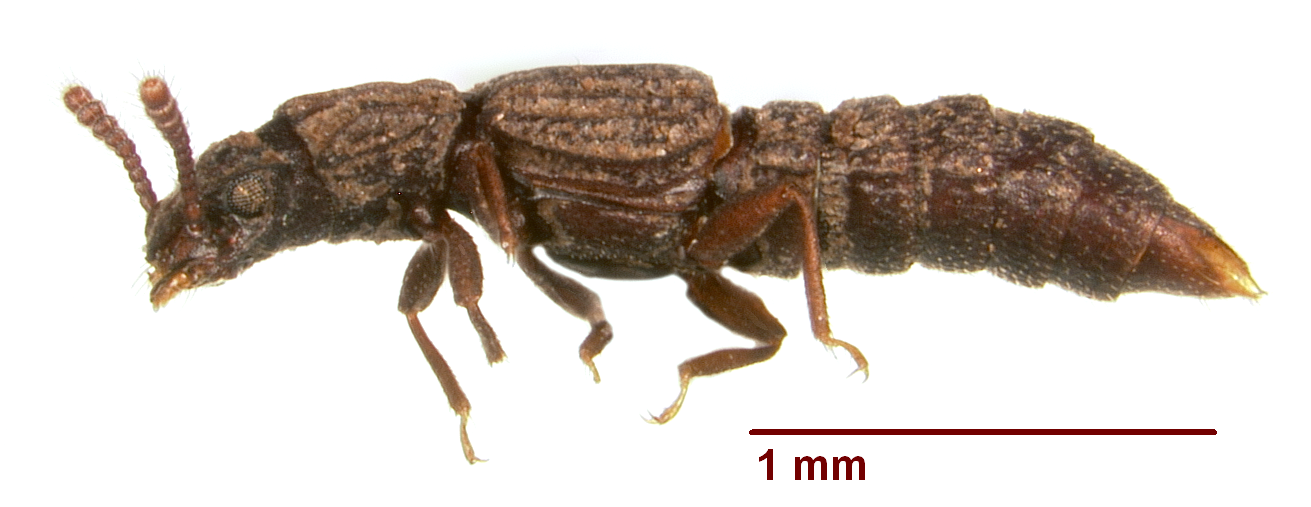
Thoracophorus costalus

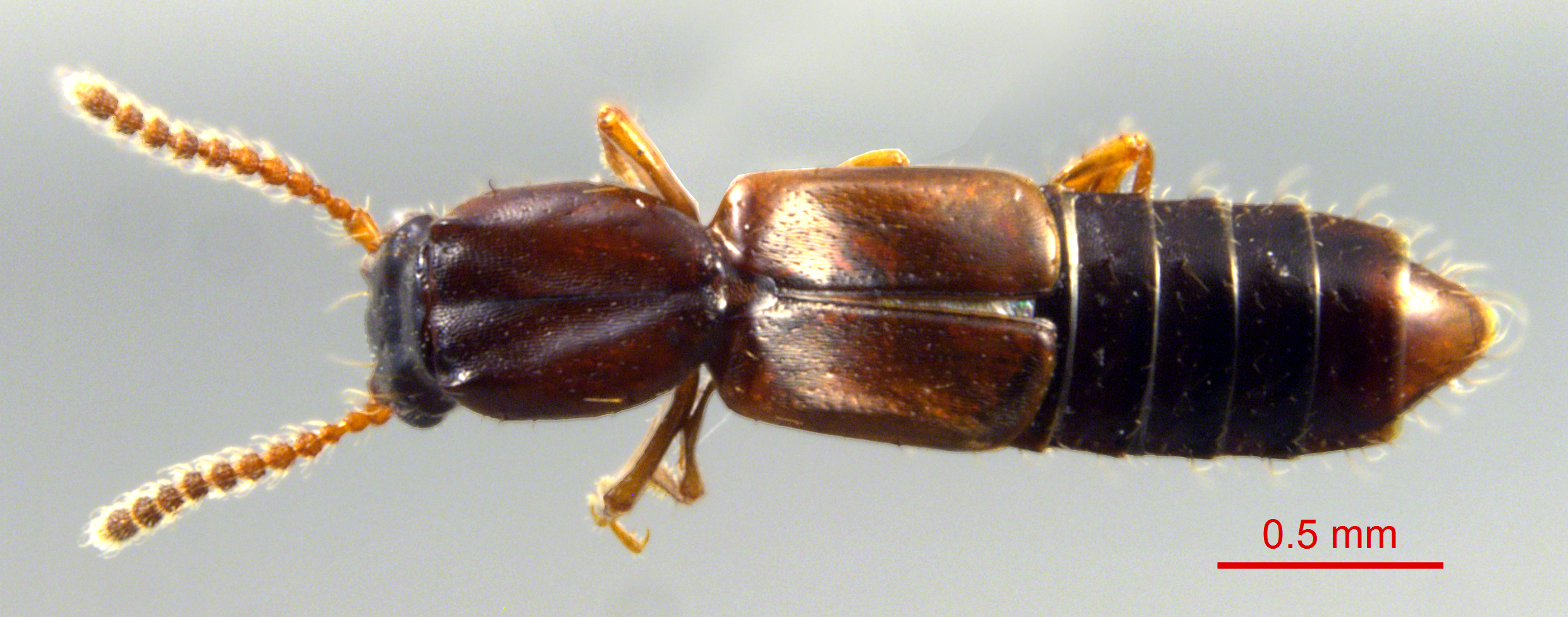
Renardia sp.

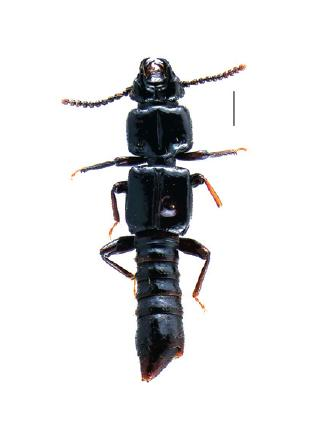
Plastus biconcavus

- Тribe Eleusinini Sharp, 1887
  - Eleusis Laporte, 1835
  - Renardia Motschulsky, 1865
  - Triga
  - Zeoleusis Steel, 1950
- Tribe Leptochirini Sharp, 1887
  - Borolinus Bernhauer, 1903
  - Bothrys Fauvel, 1895
  - Leptochirus Germar, 1824
  - Priochirus Sharp, 1887
  - Thoracochirus Bernhauer, 1903
- Tribe Osoriini Erichson, 1839
  - Afrosorius Fagel, 1958
  - Afrotyphlopsis Fagel, 1955
  - Allogonus Coiffait, 1978
  - Allosorius Fagel, 1959
  - Anancosorius Bernhauer, 1908
  - Andringitrana Coiffait, 1979
  - Antillosorius Irmler, 2010
  - Arpagonus Blackwelder, 1952
  - Atopocnemius Bernhauer, 1914
  - Bacillopsis Normand, 1920
  - Baculopsis s Cameron, 1928
  - Bothrys Fauvel, 1895
  - Craspedus Bernhauer, 1908
  - Cylindrops Fagel, 1955
  - Cylindropsis Fauvel, 1885
  - Edapholotrochus Fagel, 1958
  - Euparagonus Fagel, 1955
  - Fagelia Coiffait, 1979
  - Leptotyphlopsis Scheerpeltz, 1931
  - Lusitanopsis Coiffait, 1961
  - Neocaledonopsis Pace, 1990
  - Nototorchus McColl, 1985
  - Oligotyphlopsis Scheerpeltz, 1951
  - Osorius Guérin-Méneville, 1829
  - Paratorchus McColl, 1985
  - Typhloiulopsis Scheerpeltz, 1931
  - Typhlosorius Coiffait, 1958
- Tribe Thoracophorini Reitter, 1909
  - Aneucamptus Sharp, 1887
  - Dirocephalus Silvestri, 1938
  - Espeson Schaufuss, 1882
  - Euctenopsia Bruch, 1942
  - Fauva Blackwelder, 1952
  - Geomitopsis Scheerpeltz, 1931
  - Glyptoma Erichson, 1839
  - Liberiana Blackwelder, 1942
  - Lispinodes Blackwelder, 1942
  - Lispinus Erichson, 1839
  - Mesotrochus Wasmann, 1890
  - Nacaeus Blackwelder, 1942
  - Neolosus Blackwelder, 1942
  - Pardirocephalus Bruch, 1942
  - Parespeson Bernhauer, 1926
  - Pselaphomimus Bruch, 1942
  - Rhopalopherus Bernhauer, 1909
  - Synaenictus Patrizi, 1947
  - Tannea Blackwelder, 1952
  - Teiros Eichelbaum, 1909
  - Tetrapleurus Bernhauer, 1914
  - Thoracophorus Motschulsky, 1837
- incertae sedis:
  - Aschnaosorius
