= Leptochirini =

Scientific classification
- Kingdom: Animalia
- Phylum: Arthropoda
- Clade: Pancrustacea
- Class: Insecta
- Order: Coleoptera
- Suborder: Polyphaga
- Infraorder: Staphyliniformia
- Family: Staphylinidae
- Subfamily: Osoriinae
- Tribe: Leptochirini; Sharp, 1887

Leptochirini is a tribe of rove beetles in the subfamily Osoriinae. It was first described by Sharp in 1887. It contains 398 accepted species, split between 6 genera. The majority of recorded observations have been in Costa Rica, Panama, Guatemala, Mexico, and Venezuela.

== Genera ==
- Borolinus
- Cretochirus
- Leptochirus
- Plastus
- Priochirus
- Toracochirus
