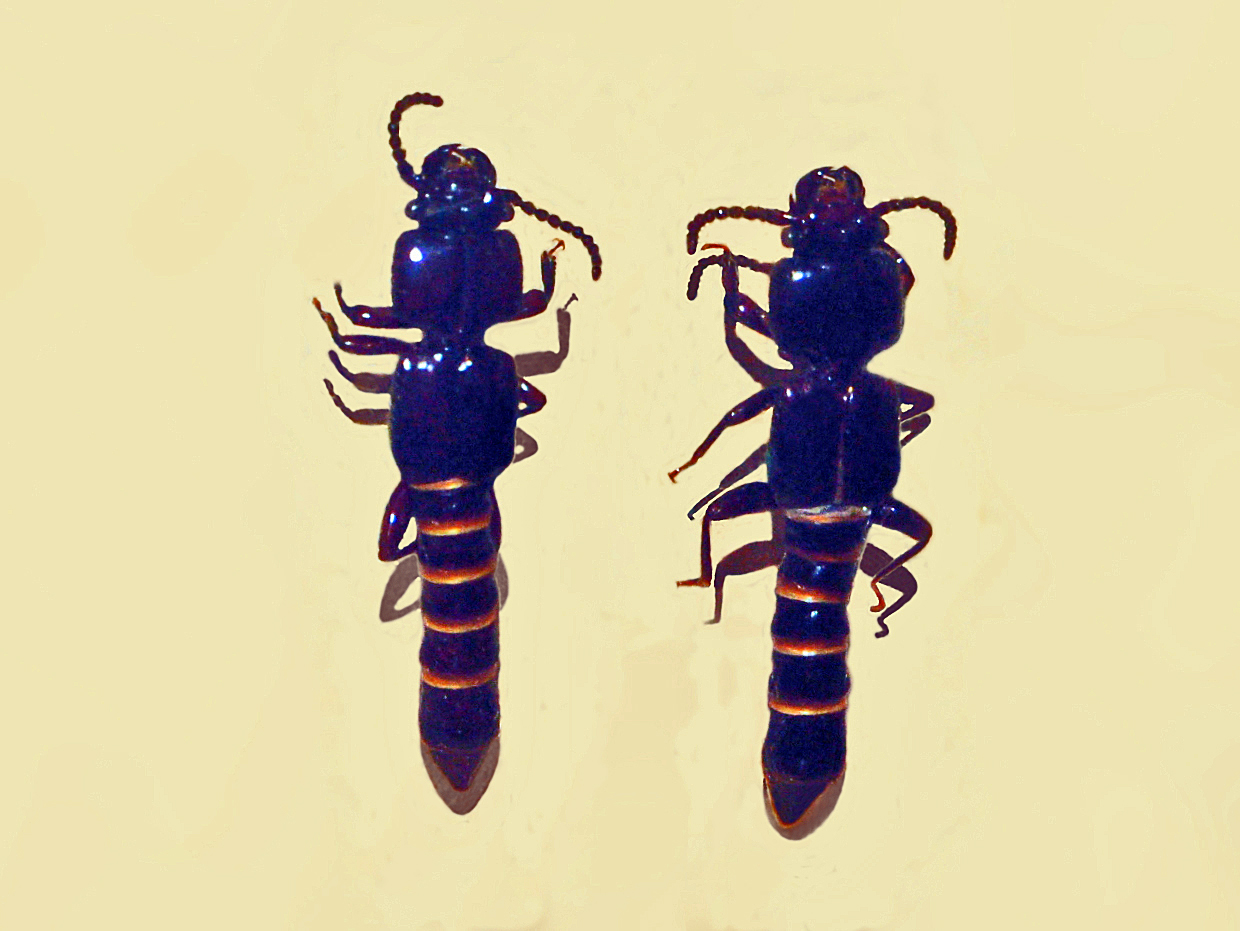
- Priochirus unicolor from Sumatra. Mounted specimen

Scientific classification
- Kingdom: Animalia
- Phylum: Arthropoda
- Class: Insecta
- Order: Coleoptera
- Suborder: Polyphaga
- Infraorder: Staphyliniformia
- Family: Staphylinidae
- Genus: Priochirus
- Species: P. unicolor

Binomial name
- Priochirus unicolor (Laporte, 1835)

Synonyms
- Leptochirus unicolor Laporte, 1835; Priochirus unicolor Heller, 1898; Leptochirus coronatus Sachse, 1852

= Priochirus unicolor =

Species of beetle

Priochirus unicolor is a species of beetles belonging to the family Staphylinidae. This species can be found in Indonesia.

== Taxonomy ==
Francis de Laporte de Castelnau described this species in 1835, placing it in the genus Leptochirus. It continued to be classified in this genus by Wilhelm Ferdinand Erichson (1840) and Albert Fauvel (1905). Those who placed it in the genus Priochirus included Karl Borromaeus Maria Josef Heller (1898).

Malcolm Cameron classified it in the Triacanthochirus subgenus of Priochirus.

As per a 1920 designation by Robert Lucas, it is the type species of the subgenus Eutriacanthus Jakobson, 1908.

In 2007, Jie Wu and Hong-Zhang Zhou transferred this species to the genus Plastus; this has been accepted by the Catalogue of Palaearctic Coleoptera.

== Distribution ==
Its type locality is Java. Fauvel wrote that its range included Sumatra, the Banggai Islands, Mentawai Islands, Bodjo, Borneo, Malacca, Cambodje.

In 1898, Heller listed its distribution as Java and the Mentawai Islands.

P. J. M. Greenslade described its range as comprising Indochina, Sumatra, and Java.

Wu and Zhao reported observing it in Yunnan Province, China; they also listed Vietnam as part of its range.

== Description ==
Laport recorded its dimensions as 5½ lignes (≈12.4 mm, 0.49 in) long and 1¼ lignes (≈2.82 mm, 0.111 in) wide. Erichson recorded its length as 6 lignes (≈13.55 mm, 0.533 in). Max Bernhauer recorded its length as 13–16 mm (0.51–0.63 in)
