= Osorius planifrons =

Scientific classification
- Kingdom: Animalia
- Phylum: Arthropoda
- Class: Insecta
- Order: Coleoptera
- Suborder: Polyphaga
- Infraorder: Staphyliniformia
- Family: Staphylinidae
- Genus: Osorius
- Species: O. planifrons

Binomial name
- Osorius planifrons LeConte, 1877

Species of beetle

Osorius planifrons is a species of unmargined rove beetle in the family Staphylinidae. It is found in Central America and North America.
