= Fagelia =

Scientific classification
- Domain: Eukaryota
- Kingdom: Animalia
- Phylum: Arthropoda
- Class: Insecta
- Order: Coleoptera
- Suborder: Polyphaga
- Infraorder: Staphyliniformia
- Family: Staphylinidae
- Subfamily: Osoriinae
- Tribe: Osoriini
- Genus: Fagelia; Coiffait, 1979

Genus of beetles

Fagelia is a genus of rove beetles in the family Staphylinidae. There are about 10 described species in Fagelia, 9 of which were described by Henri Coiffait in 1979.

All species of this genus are endemic to Madagascar.

== Species ==
These 10 species belong to the genus Fagelia:

- Fagelia andohariana Coiffait, 1979
- Fagelia cylindra Coiffait, 1979
- Fagelia descarpentriesi Coiffait, 1979
- Fagelia grandis Dajoz, 1980
- Fagelia latipes Coiffait, 1979
- Fagelia marositryana Coiffait, 1979
- Fagelia microcephala Coiffait, 1979
- Fagelia minuscula Coiffait, 1979
- Fagelia soror Coiffait, 1979
- Fagelia vicina Coiffait, 1979
