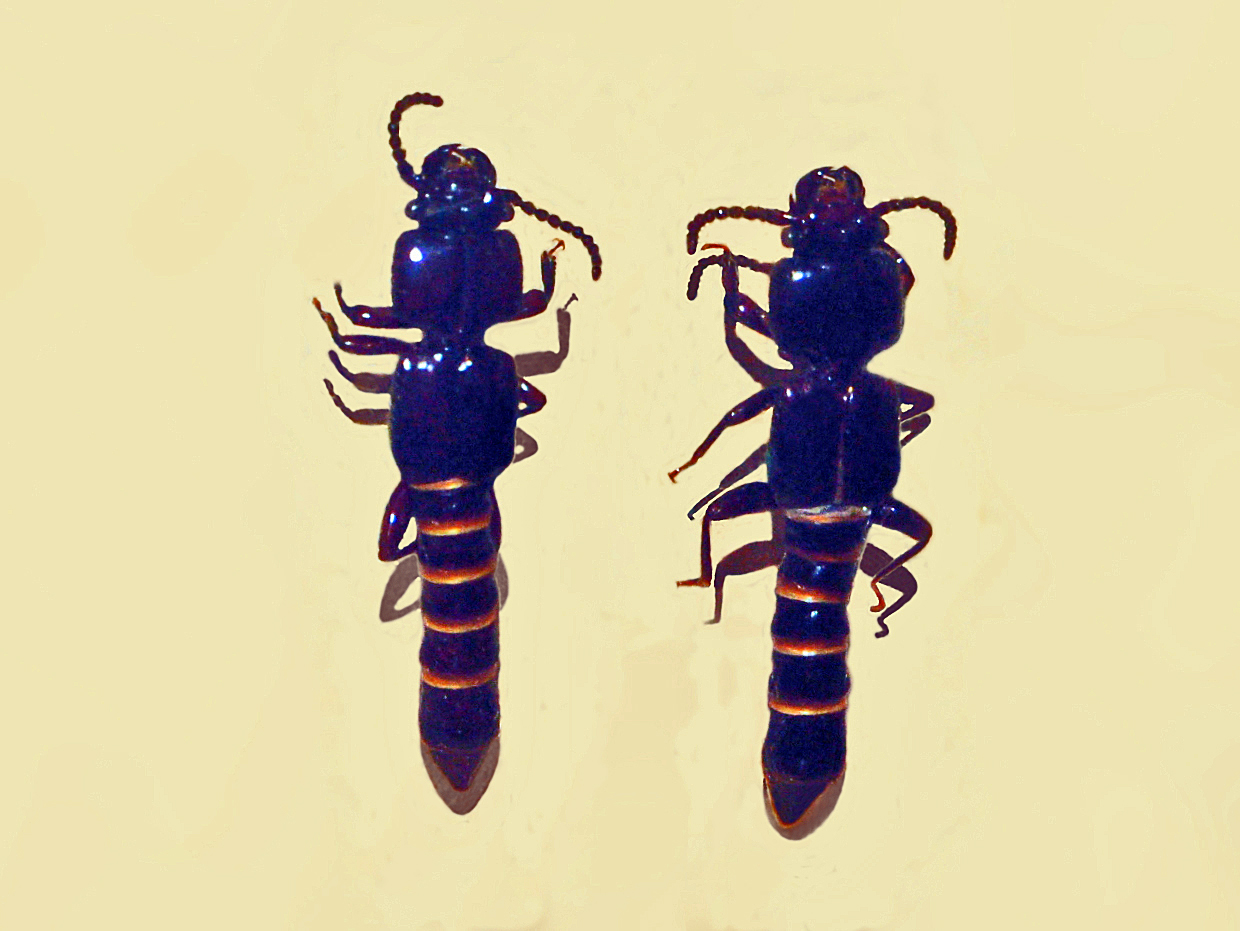
- Priochirus unicolor from Sumatra. Mounted specimen

Scientific classification
- Kingdom: Animalia
- Phylum: Arthropoda
- Clade: Pancrustacea
- Class: Insecta
- Order: Coleoptera
- Suborder: Polyphaga
- Infraorder: Staphyliniformia
- Family: Staphylinidae
- Subfamily: Osoriinae
- Tribe: Leptochirini
- Genus: Priochirus; Sharp, 1887

= Priochirus =

Genus of beetles

Priochirus is a genus of beetles belonging to the family Staphylinidae. This genus includes about 270 species widespread in Neotropical, Palaearctic, Madagascan, Oriental, Australian and Oceanic Regions.

== Selected species ==
- Priochirus acietis P. J. M. Greenslade, 1971 (Papua New Guinea)
- Priochirus albertisi Fauvel, 1878 (New Guinea)
- Priochirus bakerianus Bernhauer, 1926 (Borneo, Indonesia)
- Priochirus bicolor Cameron, 1937 (New Guinea)
- Priochirus bicornis Fauvel, 1864 (Mexico)
- Priochirus bifurcatus Fauvel, 1879 (New Guinea)
- Priochirus borneensis Cameron, 1928 (Borneo)
- Priochirus cameroni Scheerpeltz, 1933 (New Guinea)
- Priochirus confusus Cameron, 1937 (New Guinea)
- Priochirus curtidentatus Wu & Zhou, 2013 (China)
- Priochirus deltodontus Wu & Zhou, 2013 (China)
- Priochirus greensladei Herman, 2001 (New Guinea)
- Priochirus japonicus Sharp, 1889 (Taiwan, China, Japan)
- Priochirus kimurai Naomi, 1996 (Japan)
- Priochirus klimai Bernhauer, 1914 (Indonesia)
- Priochirus lautus P. J. M. Greenslade, 1971 (Papua New Guinea)
- Priochirus masahiroiNaomi, 1996 (Japan)
- Priochirus minor P. J. M. Greenslade, 1971 (Borneo)
- Priochirus mjobergi Bernhauer, 1928 (Indonesia)
- Priochirus minutus Wendeler, 1928 (Philippines)
- Priochirus quadricollis Cameron, 1924 (New Guinea)
- Priochirus reno P. J. M. Greenslade, 1971 (Papua New Guinea)
- Priochirus salvini Sharp, 1887 (Guatemala)
- Priochirus sondaicus Bernhauer, 1928 (Indonesia)
- Priochirus terebra P. J. M. Greenslade, 1971 (Papua New Guinea)
- Priochirus tridens Motschulsky, 1857 (India, Andaman Islands, Myanmar, Malaysia, Indonesia, Philippines)
- Priochirus trifurcus Wu & Zhou, 2013 (China)
- Priochirus unicolor Laporte, 1835 (Indonesia)
