= Clavilispinus rufescens =

Scientific classification
- Domain: Eukaryota
- Kingdom: Animalia
- Phylum: Arthropoda
- Class: Insecta
- Order: Coleoptera
- Suborder: Polyphaga
- Infraorder: Staphyliniformia
- Family: Staphylinidae
- Genus: Clavilispinus
- Species: C. rufescens

Binomial name
- Clavilispinus rufescens (Hatch, 1957)

Species of beetle

Clavilispinus rufescens is a species of unmargined rove beetle in the family Staphylinidae. It is found in North America.
