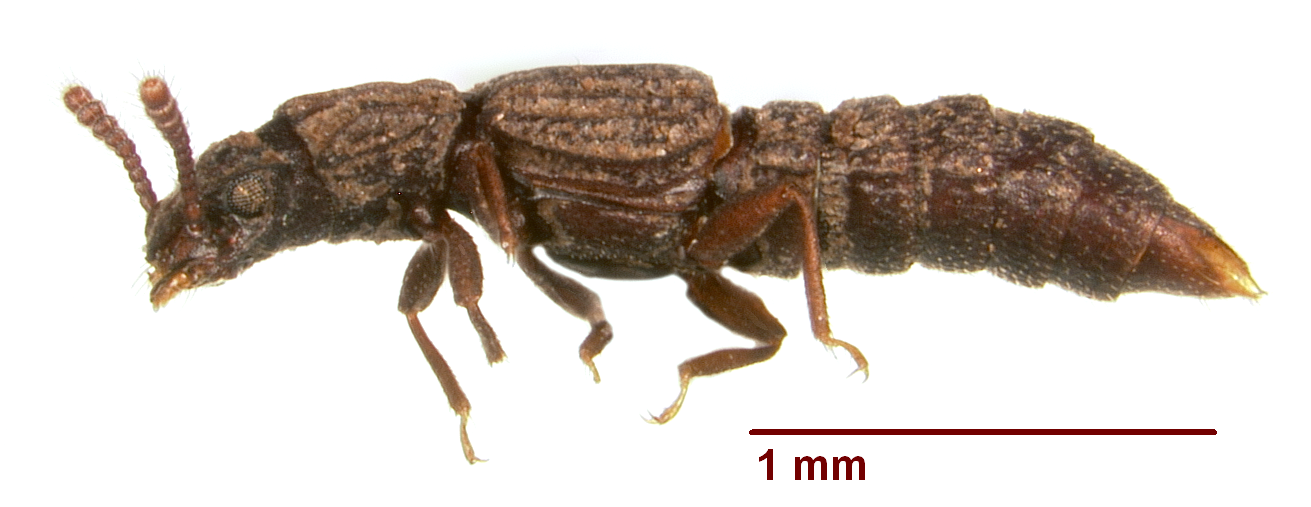

Scientific classification
- Kingdom: Animalia
- Phylum: Arthropoda
- Class: Insecta
- Order: Coleoptera
- Suborder: Polyphaga
- Infraorder: Staphyliniformia
- Family: Staphylinidae
- Genus: Thoracophorus
- Species: T. costalis

Binomial name
- Thoracophorus costalis (Erichson, 1840)

= Thoracophorus costalis =

Species of beetle

Thoracophorus costalis, the furrowed rove beetle, is a species of unmargined rove beetle in the family Staphylinidae. It is found in Central America and North America.
