= Osorius =

Scientific classification
- Kingdom: Animalia
- Phylum: Arthropoda
- Clade: Pancrustacea
- Class: Insecta
- Order: Coleoptera
- Suborder: Polyphaga
- Infraorder: Staphyliniformia
- Family: Staphylinidae
- Subfamily: Osoriinae
- Tribe: Osoriini
- Genus: Osorius; Guérin-Méneville, 1829

Genus of beetles

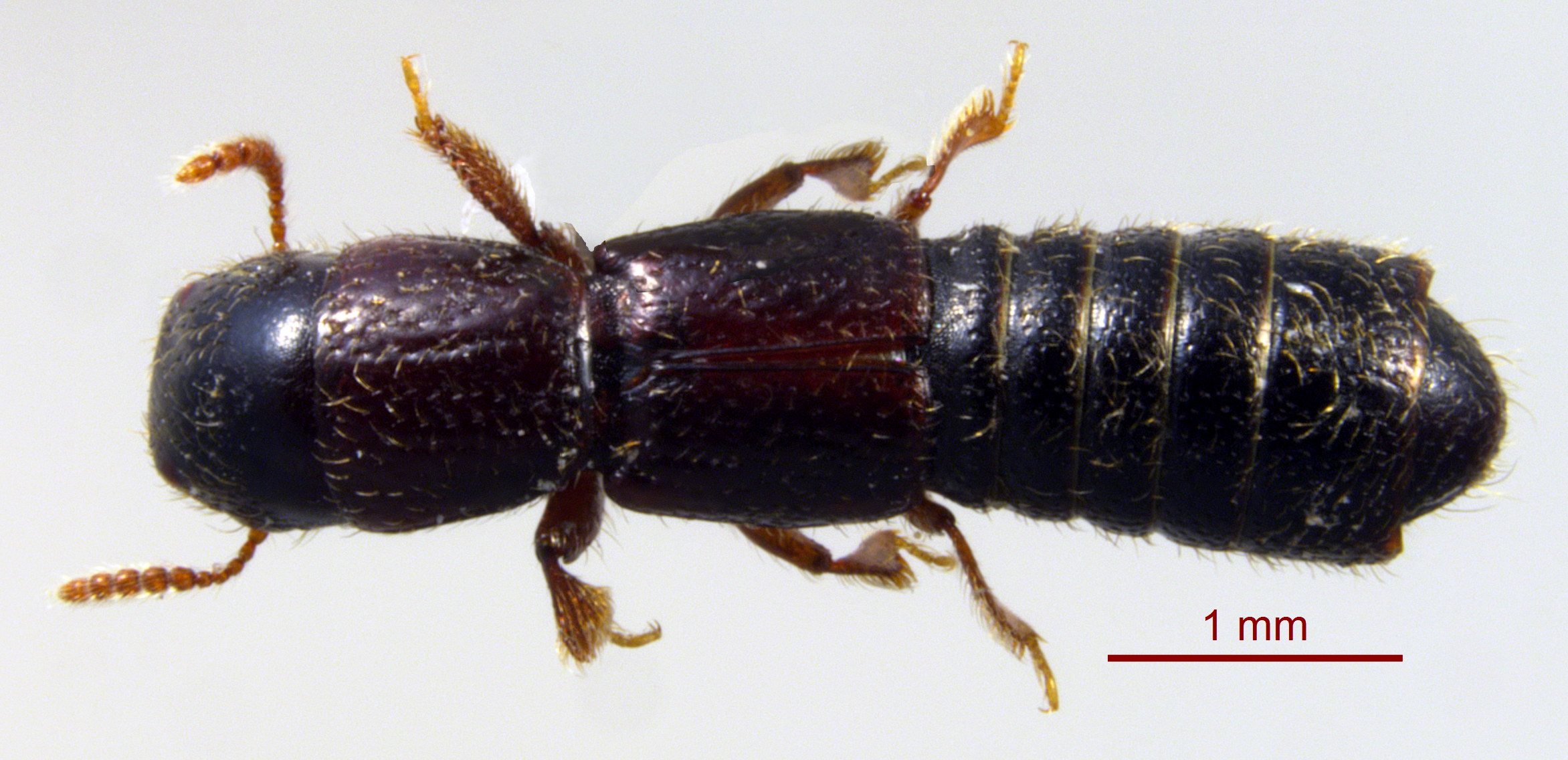
Osorius latipes

Osorius is a genus of unmargined rove beetles in the family Staphylinidae. There are about nine described species in Osorius.

== Species ==
- Osorius brevicornis Notman, 1920
- Osorius brevipennis Notman, 1925
- Osorius difficilis Notman, 1925
- Osorius latipes (Gravenhorst, 1806)
- Osorius parcus Sharp, 1887
- Osorius parviceps Notman, 1925
- Osorius planifrons LeConte, 1877
- Osorius politus LeConte, 1877
- Osorius variolatus Notman, 1925
