= Thoracophorus brevicristatus =

Scientific classification
- Domain: Eukaryota
- Kingdom: Animalia
- Phylum: Arthropoda
- Class: Insecta
- Order: Coleoptera
- Suborder: Polyphaga
- Infraorder: Staphyliniformia
- Family: Staphylinidae
- Genus: Thoracophorus
- Species: T. brevicristatus

Binomial name
- Thoracophorus brevicristatus (Horn, 1871)

Species of beetle

Thoracophorus brevicristatus is a species of unmargined rove beetle in the family Staphylinidae. It is found in Africa, the Caribbean, Central America, North America, and Southern Asia.
