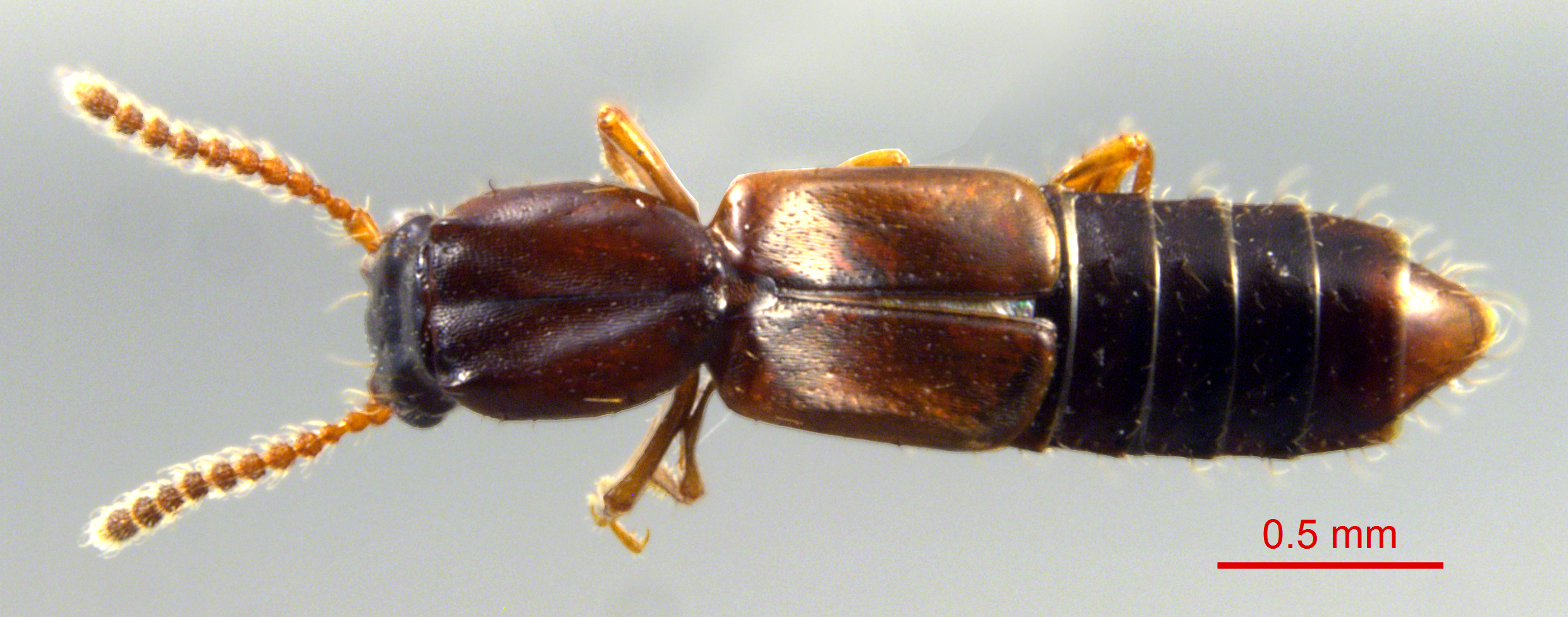

Scientific classification
- Kingdom: Animalia
- Phylum: Arthropoda
- Class: Insecta
- Order: Coleoptera
- Suborder: Polyphaga
- Infraorder: Staphyliniformia
- Family: Staphylinidae
- Subfamily: Osoriinae
- Tribe: Eleusinini
- Genus: Renardia; Motschulsky, 1865

Species
- See text

= Renardia =

Genus of beetles

Renardia is a genus of unmargined rove beetles in the family Staphylinidae. There are at least two described species in Renardia.

== Species ==
These two species belong to the genus Renardia:

- Renardia canadensis (Horn, 1871)^{i c g}
- Renardia nigrella (LeConte, 1863)^{i c g b}

Data sources: i = ITIS, c = Catalogue of Life, g = GBIF, b = Bugguide.net
