= Eleusinini =

Scientific classification
- Kingdom: Animalia
- Phylum: Arthropoda
- Clade: Pancrustacea
- Class: Insecta
- Order: Coleoptera
- Suborder: Polyphaga
- Infraorder: Staphyliniformia
- Family: Staphylinidae
- Subfamily: Osoriinae
- Tribe: Eleusinini; Sharp, 1887

Eleusinini is a tribe of rove beetles in the subfamily Osoriinae. It was first described by Sharp in 1887. It contains 224 accepted species split between three genera. The majority of recorded observations of Eleusinini members have been in Costa Rica and the United States.

== Genera ==
- Eleusis
- Renardia
- Zeoleusis
