= Craspedus =

Scientific classification
- Kingdom: Animalia
- Phylum: Arthropoda
- Class: Insecta
- Order: Coleoptera
- Suborder: Polyphaga
- Infraorder: Staphyliniformia
- Family: Staphylinidae
- Subfamily: Osoriinae
- Genus: Craspedus; Bernhauer, 1908

Genus of beetles

Craspedus is a genus of beetles.

== Placement ==
Craspedus is uncontroversially placed in the tribe Osoriini of the subfamily Osoriinae.

== Distribution ==
Craspedus is indigenous to the Neotropical region (Brazil and Mexico).
