= Allosorius =

Scientific classification
- Domain: Eukaryota
- Kingdom: Animalia
- Phylum: Arthropoda
- Class: Insecta
- Order: Coleoptera
- Suborder: Polyphaga
- Infraorder: Staphyliniformia
- Family: Staphylinidae
- Subfamily: Osoriinae
- Tribe: Osoriini
- Genus: Allosorius; Fagel, 1959

Genus of beetles

Allosorius is a genus of rove beetles in the family Staphylinidae. There are at least three described species in Allosorius.

== Species ==
These three species belong to the genus Allosorius:

- Allosorius leonensis (Cameron, 1948) (Sierra Leone, Guinea)
- Allosorius paradoxus (Bernhauer, 1927) (South Africa)
- Allosorius striola (Fauvel, 1878) (New Guinea, Indonesia (Aru Islands))
