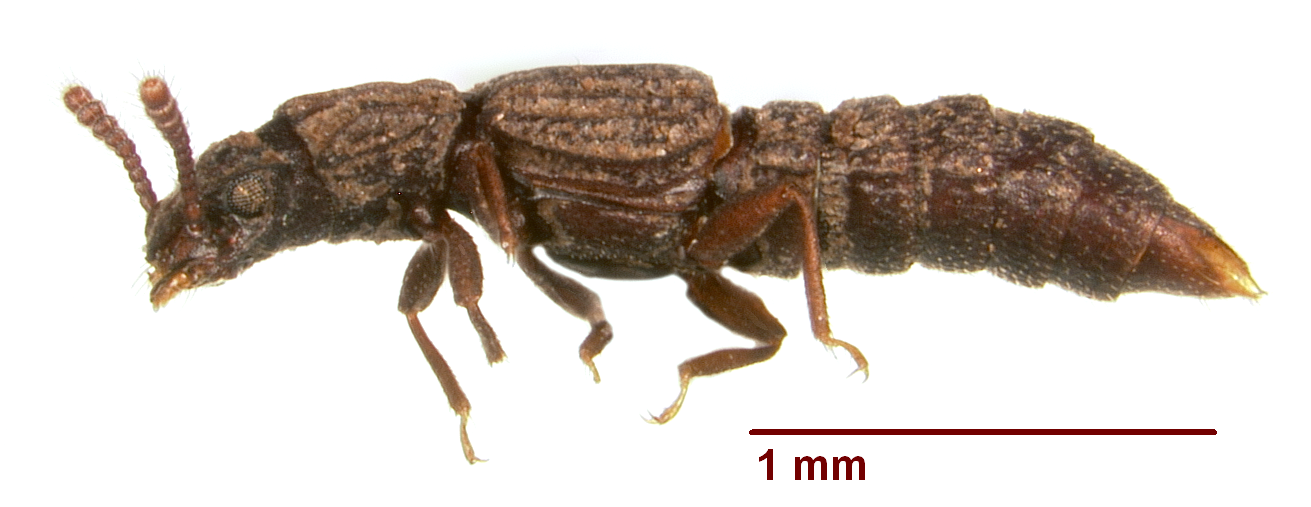
- Thoracophorus costalis

Scientific classification
- Kingdom: Animalia
- Phylum: Arthropoda
- Class: Insecta
- Order: Coleoptera
- Suborder: Polyphaga
- Infraorder: Staphyliniformia
- Family: Staphylinidae
- Subfamily: Osoriinae
- Tribe: Thoracophorini; Reitter, 1909

= Thoracophorini =

Tribe of beetles

Thoracophorini is a tribe of unmargined rove beetles in the family Staphylinidae. There are at least three genera and about six described species in Thoracophorini.

== Genera ==
These three genera belong to the tribe Thoracophorini:

- Clavilispinus Bernhauer, 1926^{i c g b}
- Nacaeus Blackwelder, 1942^{i c g b}
- Thoracophorus Motschulsky, 1837^{i c g b}

Data sources: i = ITIS, c = Catalogue of Life, g = GBIF, b = Bugguide.net
