= Renardia nigrella =

Scientific classification
- Domain: Eukaryota
- Kingdom: Animalia
- Phylum: Arthropoda
- Class: Insecta
- Order: Coleoptera
- Suborder: Polyphaga
- Infraorder: Staphyliniformia
- Family: Staphylinidae
- Genus: Renardia
- Species: R. nigrella

Binomial name
- Renardia nigrella (LeConte, 1863)

Species of beetle

Renardia nigrella is a species of unmargined rove beetle in the family Staphylinidae.
