= Osoriini =

Scientific classification
- Kingdom: Animalia
- Phylum: Arthropoda
- Clade: Pancrustacea
- Class: Insecta
- Order: Coleoptera
- Suborder: Polyphaga
- Infraorder: Staphyliniformia
- Family: Staphylinidae
- Subfamily: Osoriinae
- Tribe: Osoriini; Erichson, 1839

Osoriini is a tribe of rove beetles in the subfamily Osoriinae. It was first described by Erichson in 1839. It contains 1,047 accepted species split between 70 genera in 2 subtribes.

== Subtribes and genera ==
- Osoriina
  - Holotrochus
  - Molosoma
- Parosoriina
  - Afrosorius
  - Afrotyphlopsis
  - Allogonus
  - Allosorius
  - Anacosorius
  - Andringitrana
  - Antillosorius
  - Arpagonus
  - Atopocnemius
  - Bacillopsis
  - Baculopsis
  - Bothrys
  - Craspedus
  - Cylindrops
  - Cylindropsis
  - Edapholotrochus
  - Euparagonus
  - Fagelia
  - Gigarthrus
  - Gnatholotrochus
  - Heterocylindropsis
  - Heterosorius
  - Holotrochodes
  - Holotrochomorphus
  - Holotrochopsis
  - Idiocnemius
  - Kistneria
  - Leptotyphlopsis
  - Levasseuria
  - Lusitanopsis
  - Medcosorius
  - Madegassosorius
  - Mimogonellus
  - Mimogonia
  - Mimogonidius
  - Mimogonoderus
  - Momogonus
  - Mimotrochus
  - Molosoma
  - Neocaledonopsis
  - Neorhabdopsis
  - Neosorius
  - Nepalocylindrops
  - Nototorchus
  - Oeophronistus
  - Oligotyphlopsis
  - Oryssomma
  - Osoriocanthus
  - Osoriopsis
  - Osoriosetus
  - Osorius
  - Ouloglene
  - Paratorchus
  - Paratrochodes
  - Paraosorius
  - Rhabdopsidius
  - Rhabdopsis
  - Saegerius
  - Tavakiliandia
  - Tetrosorius
  - Thoracogonus
  - Thoracoprius
  - Tumboecus
  - Typhlholotrochus
  - Typhlobledius
  - Typhloiulopsis
  - Typhlosorius
  - Witelsus
