= Neocaledonopsis =

Scientific classification
- Kingdom: Animalia
- Phylum: Arthropoda
- Class: Insecta
- Order: Coleoptera
- Suborder: Polyphaga
- Infraorder: Staphyliniformia
- Family: Staphylinidae
- Subfamily: Osoriinae
- Genus: Neocaledonopsis; Pace, 1990

Genus of beetles

Neocaledonopsis is a genus of beetles.

== Placement ==
Neocaledonopsis is uncontroversially placed in the tribe Osoriini of the subfamily Osoriinae.
