= Clavilispinus =

Scientific classification
- Domain: Eukaryota
- Kingdom: Animalia
- Phylum: Arthropoda
- Class: Insecta
- Order: Coleoptera
- Suborder: Polyphaga
- Infraorder: Staphyliniformia
- Family: Staphylinidae
- Tribe: Thoracophorini
- Subtribe: Clavilispinina
- Genus: Clavilispinus; Bernhauer, 1926

Genus of beetles

Clavilispinus is a genus of unmargined rove beetles in the family Staphylinidae. There are about 14 described species in Clavilispinus.

== Species ==
These 14 species belong to the genus Clavilispinus:

- Clavilispinus californicus (LeConte, 1863)
- Clavilispinus cephalotes
- Clavilispinus distinguendus
- Clavilispinus exiguus (Erichson, 1840)
- Clavilispinus guadeloupensis Irmler, 1991
- Clavilispinus jeani Herman, 2001
- Clavilispinus junkii
- Clavilispinus laevicauda
- Clavilispinus leai (Cameron, 1927)
- Clavilispinus politus (Sharp, 1887)
- Clavilispinus prolixus (LeConte, 1877)
- Clavilispinus rufescens (Hatch, 1957)
- Clavilispinus sulcicollis (Coiffait, 1976)
- Clavilispinus vinsoni (Jarrige, 1957)
