= Clavilispinus exiguus =

Scientific classification
- Kingdom: Animalia
- Phylum: Arthropoda
- Class: Insecta
- Order: Coleoptera
- Suborder: Polyphaga
- Infraorder: Staphyliniformia
- Family: Staphylinidae
- Genus: Clavilispinus
- Species: C. exiguus

Binomial name
- Clavilispinus exiguus (Erichson, 1840)

Species of beetle

Clavilispinus exiguus is a species of unmargined rove beetle in the family Staphylinidae. It is found in Africa, Australia, the Caribbean Sea, Central America, North America, Oceania, South America, and Southern Asia.
