= Paratorchus =

Scientific classification
- Kingdom: Animalia
- Phylum: Arthropoda
- Class: Insecta
- Order: Coleoptera
- Suborder: Polyphaga
- Infraorder: Staphyliniformia
- Family: Staphylinidae
- Subfamily: Osoriinae
- Genus: Paratorchus; McColl, 1985

Genus of beetles

Paratorchus is a genus of beetles.

== Placement ==
Paratorchus is uncontroversially placed in the tribe Osoriini of the subfamily Osoriinae.

== Distribution ==
Paratorchus is indigenous to the Neotropical realm and the Australasian realm (New Zealand).

== Recognition ==
Paratorchus differs from Holotrochus only by having reduced eyes and elytra with indistinct sutural striae.
