= Nototorchus =

Scientific classification
- Kingdom: Animalia
- Phylum: Arthropoda
- Class: Insecta
- Order: Coleoptera
- Suborder: Polyphaga
- Infraorder: Staphyliniformia
- Family: Staphylinidae
- Subfamily: Osoriinae
- Tribe: Osoriini
- Genus: Nototorchus; McColl, 1985

Synonyms
- Nototrochus McColl, 1982

Genus of beetles

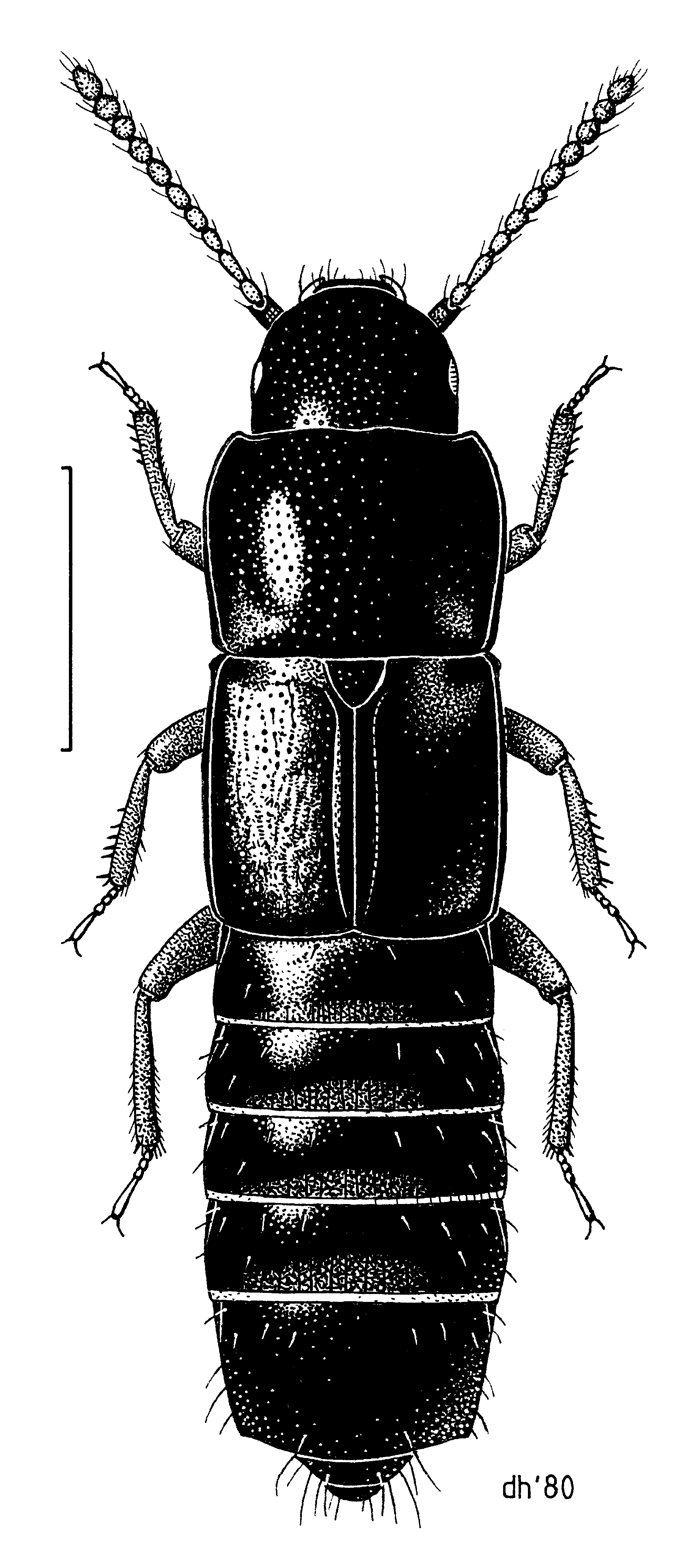
Nototorchus ferrugineus illustrated by Des Helmore.

Nototorchus is a genus of rove beetles in the family Staphylinidae. There are two described species in Nototorchus, found in New Zealand.

== Species ==
These species belong to the genus Nototorchus:

- Nototorchus ferrugineus (Broun, 1893)
- Nototorchus montanus (Broun, 1910)
