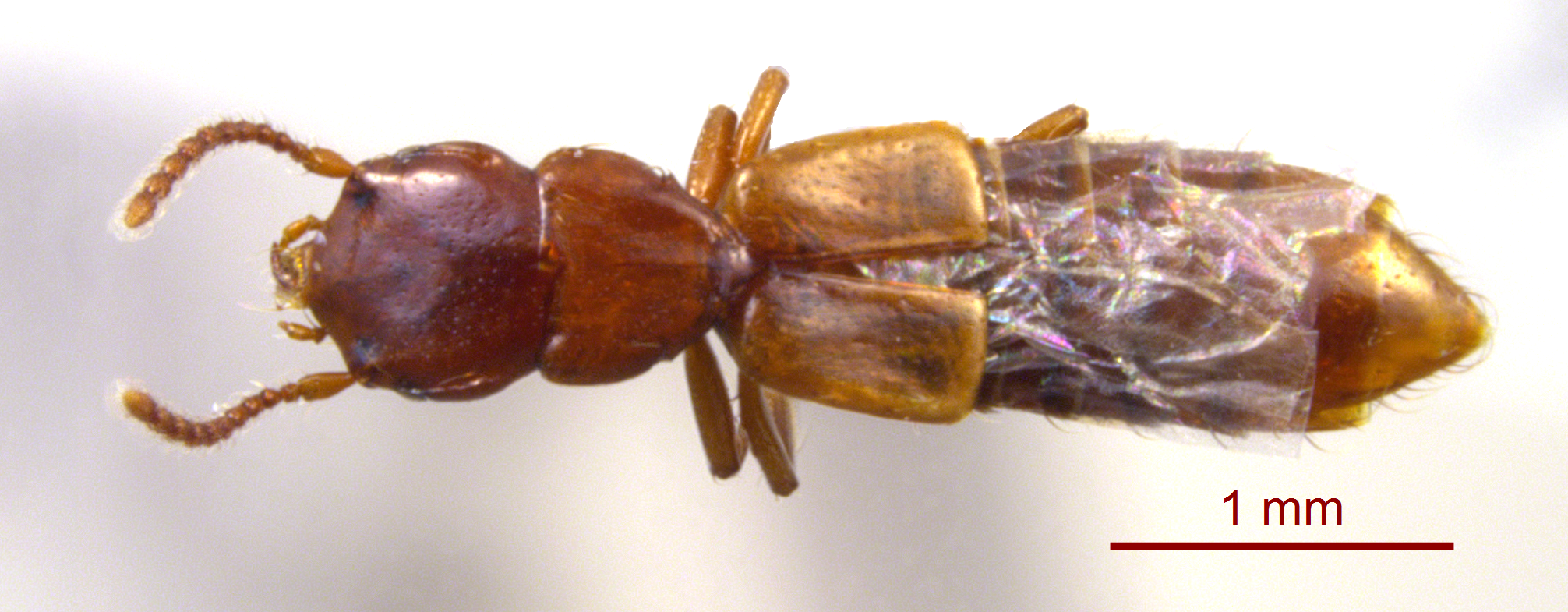
- Eleusis pallida

Scientific classification
- Domain: Eukaryota
- Kingdom: Animalia
- Phylum: Arthropoda
- Class: Insecta
- Order: Coleoptera
- Suborder: Polyphaga
- Infraorder: Staphyliniformia
- Family: Staphylinidae
- Subfamily: Osoriinae
- Tribe: Eleusinini
- Genus: Eleusis; Laporte, 1835

= Eleusis (beetle) =

Genus of beetles

Eleusis is a genus of unmargined rove beetles in the family Staphylinidae. There are about 10 described species in Eleusis.

== Species ==
These 10 species belong to the genus Eleusis:

- Eleusis angusticeps Bernhauer, 1926^{g}
- Eleusis apicipennis (Fairmaire, 1849)^{g}
- Eleusis divergens Bernhauer, 1926^{g}
- Eleusis humilis Erichson, 1840^{i c g}
- Eleusis pacifica Cameron, 1933^{g}
- Eleusis pallida LeConte, 1863^{i c g b}
- Eleusis pallidipennis (Fauvel, 1864)^{g}
- Eleusis raoultii (Fairmaire, 1880)^{g}
- Eleusis schedli Scheerpeltz, 1956^{g}
- Eleusis terminata Fauvel, 1869^{g}

Data sources: i = ITIS, c = Catalogue of Life, g = GBIF, b = Bugguide.net
