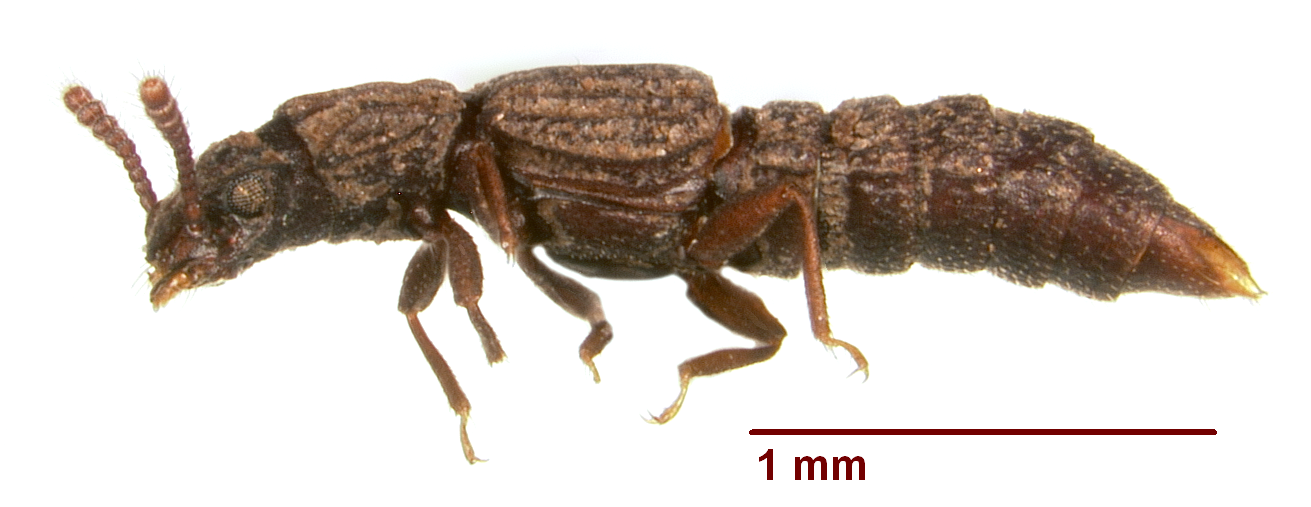
- Thoracophorus costalis

Scientific classification
- Kingdom: Animalia
- Phylum: Arthropoda
- Class: Insecta
- Order: Coleoptera
- Suborder: Polyphaga
- Infraorder: Staphyliniformia
- Family: Staphylinidae
- Tribe: Thoracophorini
- Subtribe: Thoracophorina
- Genus: Thoracophorus; Motschulsky, 1837

= Thoracophorus =

Genus of beetles

Thoracophorus is a genus of unmargined rove beetles in the family Staphylinidae. There are more than 20 described species in Thoracophorus.

== Species ==
These 24 species belong to the genus Thoracophorus:

- Thoracophorus blackburni (Sharp, 1880)
- Thoracophorus brevicristatus (Horn, 1871)
- Thoracophorus brevipenne Sharp, 1880
- Thoracophorus brevipennis (Sharp, 1880)
- Thoracophorus certatus Sharp
- Thoracophorus corticinus Motschulsky, 1837
- Thoracophorus costalis (Erichson, 1840) (furrowed rove beetle)
- Thoracophorus distinguendus
- Thoracophorus elongatus Cameron, 1938
- Thoracophorus exilis (Erichson, 1840)
- Thoracophorus filum Sharp, 1887
- Thoracophorus fletcheri Wendeler, 1927
- Thoracophorus guadalupensis Cameron, 1913
- Thoracophorus hermanii
- Thoracophorus longicollis Motschulsky, 1860
- Thoracophorus palaeobrevicristatus Irmler, 2003
- Thoracophorus perplexus Irmler, 2015
- Thoracophorus proximus Irmler, 1985
- Thoracophorus sculptilis (Erichson, 1840)
- Thoracophorus silvaticus
- Thoracophorus simplex Wendeler, 1930
- Thoracophorus struyvei Irmler, 2015
- Thoracophorus verhaaghi
- Thoracophorus zicsii
