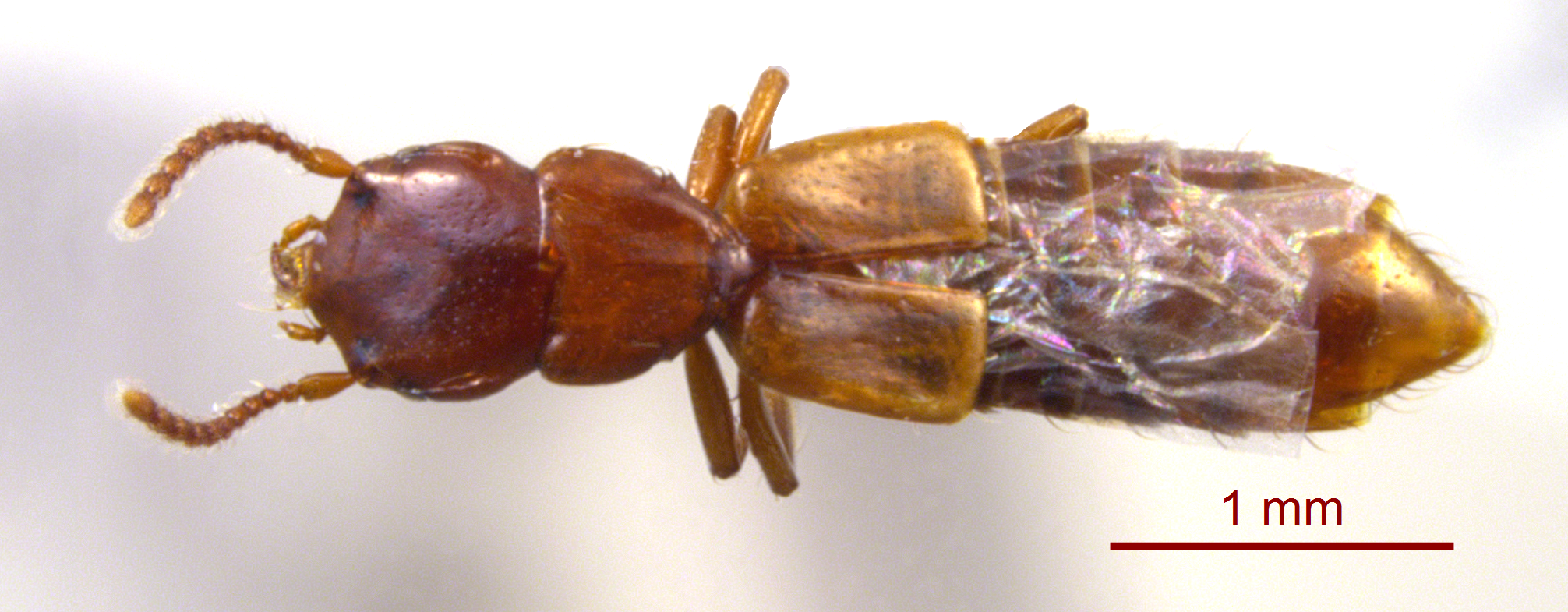

Scientific classification
- Domain: Eukaryota
- Kingdom: Animalia
- Phylum: Arthropoda
- Class: Insecta
- Order: Coleoptera
- Suborder: Polyphaga
- Infraorder: Staphyliniformia
- Family: Staphylinidae
- Genus: Eleusis
- Species: E. pallida

Binomial name
- Eleusis pallida LeConte, 1863

= Eleusis pallida =

Species of beetle

Eleusis pallida is a species of unmargined rove beetle in the family Staphylinidae. It is found in North America.
