= Eleusis (Thera) =

Ancient town on the island of Thera

Coordinates: 36°20′21″N 25°26′27″E

Eleusis (Ancient Greek: Ἐλευσίς) was an ancient town on the island of Thera, mentioned by Ptolemy.

Its site is tentatively located near Vlychada.
