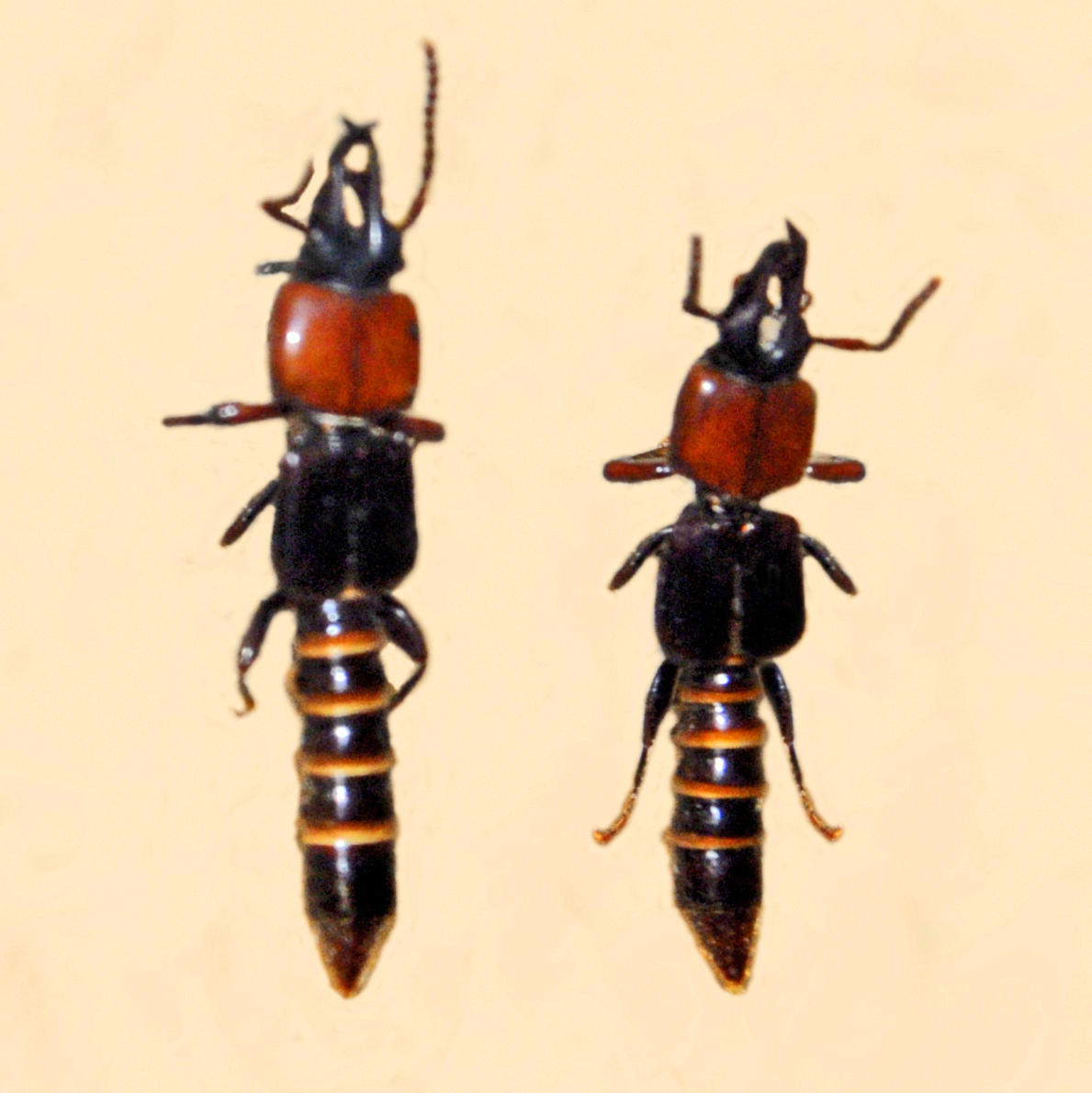
- Leptochirus javanus from Sumatra. Museum specimen

Scientific classification
- Kingdom: Animalia
- Phylum: Arthropoda
- Class: Insecta
- Order: Coleoptera
- Suborder: Polyphaga
- Infraorder: Staphyliniformia
- Family: Staphylinidae
- Subfamily: Osoriinae
- Genus: Leptochirus; Germar, 1824

= Leptochirus =

Genus of beetles

Leptochirus is a genus of beetles in the family Staphylinidae, the rove beetles.

== Species ==
- Leptochirus brunneoniger
- Leptochirus costaricensis Bernhauer 1942
- Leptochirus javanus Laporte de Castelnau
- Leptochirus laevis Laporte de Castelnau, 1840
- Leptochirus laeviventris Fauvel 1902
- Leptochirus marina
- Leptochirus maxi
- Leptochirus maxillosus
- Leptochirus mery
- Leptochirus milton
- Leptochirus molossus Sharp, 1882–1887
- Leptochirus scoriaceus Germar, 1824
