= Clambus ceylonicus =

Scientific classification
- Kingdom: Animalia
- Phylum: Arthropoda
- Class: Insecta
- Order: Coleoptera
- Suborder: Polyphaga
- Infraorder: Elateriformia
- Family: Clambidae
- Genus: Clambus
- Species: C. ceylonicus

Binomial name
- Clambus ceylonicus Endrody-Younga, 1978

Species of beetle

Clambus ceylonicus, is a species of fringe-winged beetle endemic to Sri Lanka.

== Description ==
This comparatively large species has a body length is about 1.0 to 1.1 mm.
