= Clambus pumilus =

Scientific classification
- Kingdom: Animalia
- Phylum: Arthropoda
- Class: Insecta
- Order: Coleoptera
- Suborder: Polyphaga
- Infraorder: Elateriformia
- Family: Clambidae
- Genus: Clambus
- Species: C. pumilus

Binomial name
- Clambus pumilus Motschulsky, 1863

Species of beetle

Clambus pumilus, is a species of fringe-winged beetle endemic to Sri Lanka.
