= Clambus howdeni =

Scientific classification
- Domain: Eukaryota
- Kingdom: Animalia
- Phylum: Arthropoda
- Class: Insecta
- Order: Coleoptera
- Suborder: Polyphaga
- Infraorder: Elateriformia
- Family: Clambidae
- Genus: Clambus
- Species: C. howdeni

Binomial name
- Clambus howdeni Endrödy-Younga, 1981

Species of beetle

Clambus howdeni is a species of minute beetle in the family Clambidae. It is found in North America.
