= Acalyptomerus asiaticus =

Scientific classification
- Kingdom: Animalia
- Phylum: Arthropoda
- Clade: Pancrustacea
- Class: Insecta
- Order: Coleoptera
- Suborder: Polyphaga
- Infraorder: Elateriformia
- Family: Clambidae
- Subfamily: Acalyptomerinae
- Genus: Acalyptomerus
- Species: A. asiaticus

Binomial name
- Acalyptomerus asiaticus Crowson, 1979

Species of beetle

Acalyptomerus asiaticus

Acalyptomerus asiaticus, is a species of fringe-winged beetle found in India, Sri Lanka, Malaysia and Thailand. It is also introduced to Jamaica.

== Description ==
Body length is about 1.06 to 1.18 mm.
