= Calyptomerus oblongulus =

Scientific classification
- Domain: Eukaryota
- Kingdom: Animalia
- Phylum: Arthropoda
- Class: Insecta
- Order: Coleoptera
- Suborder: Polyphaga
- Infraorder: Elateriformia
- Family: Clambidae
- Genus: Calyptomerus
- Species: C. oblongulus

Binomial name
- Calyptomerus oblongulus Mannerheim, 1853

Species of beetle

Calyptomerus oblongulus is a species of minute beetle in the family Clambidae. It is found in North America.
