= Loricaster rotundus =

Scientific classification
- Domain: Eukaryota
- Kingdom: Animalia
- Phylum: Arthropoda
- Class: Insecta
- Order: Coleoptera
- Suborder: Polyphaga
- Infraorder: Elateriformia
- Family: Clambidae
- Genus: Loricaster
- Species: L. rotundus

Binomial name
- Loricaster rotundus Grigarick & Schuster, 1961

Species of beetle

Loricaster rotundus is a species of small beetle in the family Clambidae. It is found in North America.
