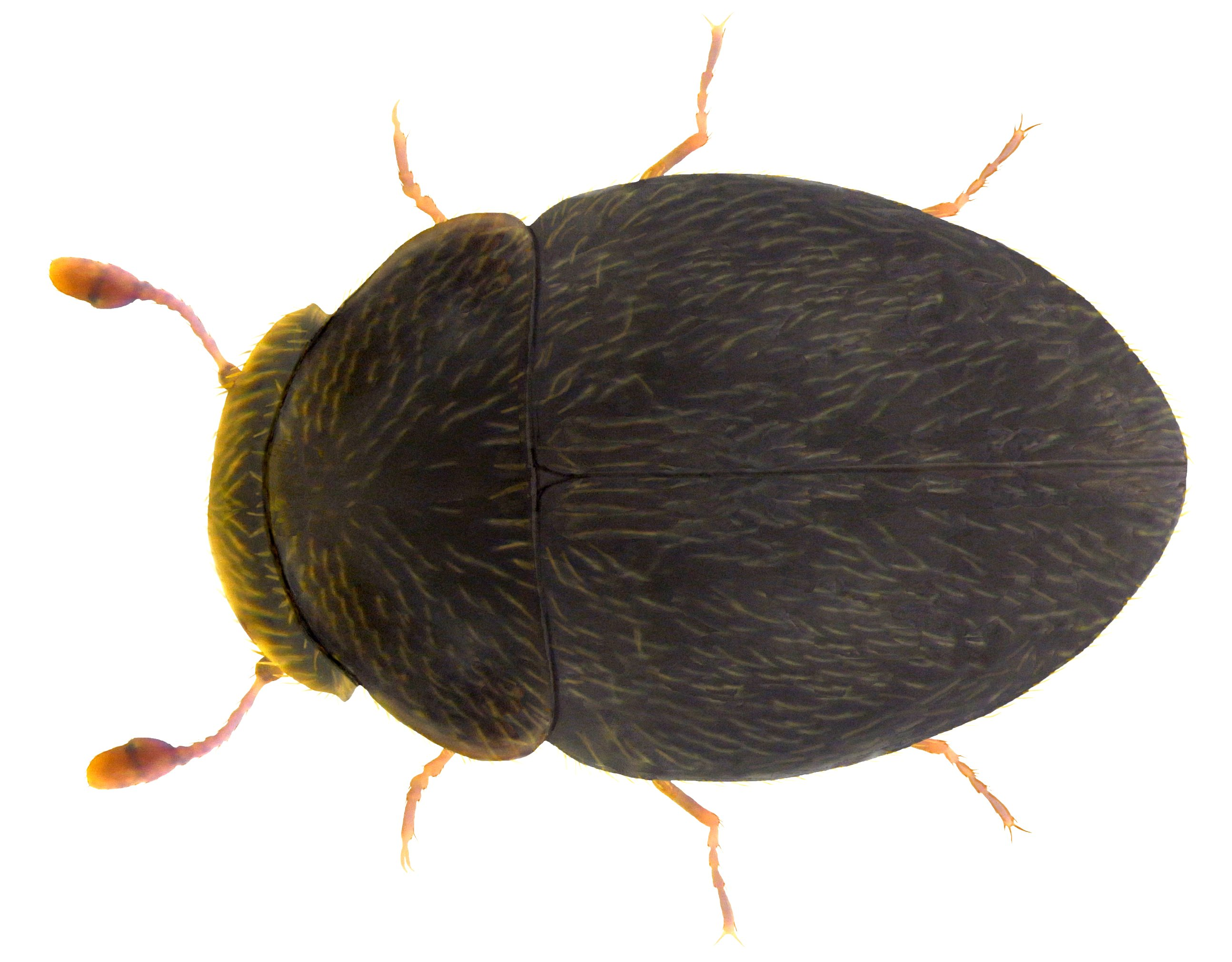

Scientific classification
- Domain: Eukaryota
- Kingdom: Animalia
- Phylum: Arthropoda
- Class: Insecta
- Order: Coleoptera
- Suborder: Polyphaga
- Infraorder: Elateriformia
- Family: Clambidae
- Genus: Clambus
- Species: C. armadillo

Binomial name
- Clambus armadillo (De Geer, 1774)

Synonyms
- Dermestes armadillus De Geer, 1774; Agathidium atomarium Sturm, 1807; Agathidium nanum Stephens, 1829; Clambus convexus Marsham, 1802; Clambus armadillo Hatch, 1929; Clambus niger Hatch, 1957

= Clambus armadillo =

Species of beetle

Clambus armadillo is a species of small beetle in the family Clambidae. It is found in Europe and Northern Asia (excluding China) and North America.

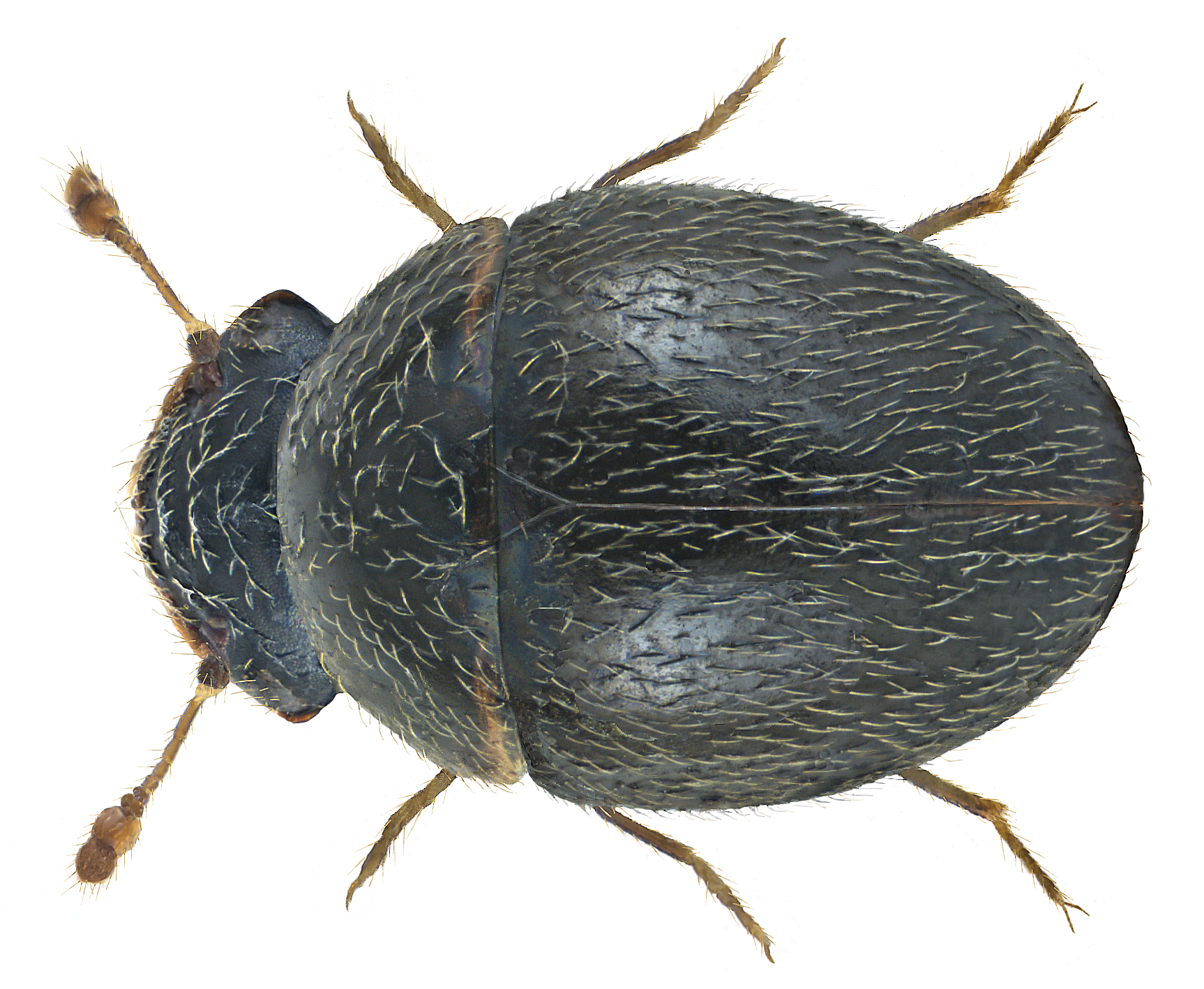
