= Clambus =

Clambus may refer to:

- Clambus (beetle), a genus of insects in the family Clambidae
- Clambus (plant), a genus of plants in the family Phyllanthaceae
