= Clambus pubescens =

Scientific classification
- Domain: Eukaryota
- Kingdom: Animalia
- Phylum: Arthropoda
- Class: Insecta
- Order: Coleoptera
- Suborder: Polyphaga
- Infraorder: Elateriformia
- Family: Clambidae
- Genus: Clambus
- Species: C. pubescens

Binomial name
- Clambus pubescens Redtenbacher, 1849

Synonyms
- Clambus puberulus LeConte, 1863

Species of beetle

Clambus pubescens is a species of small beetle in the family Clambidae. It is found in Europe and Northern Asia (excluding China) and North America.
