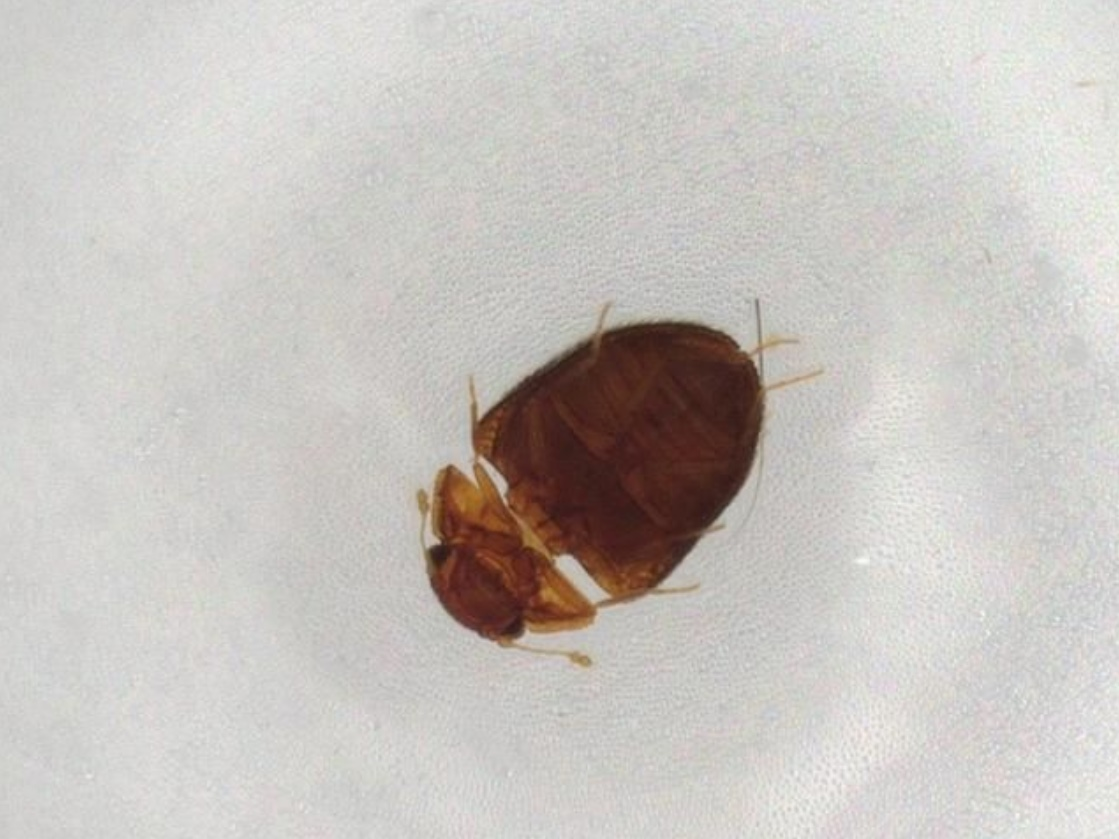
- Acalyptomerus, Costa Rica

Scientific classification
- Domain: Eukaryota
- Kingdom: Animalia
- Phylum: Arthropoda
- Class: Insecta
- Order: Coleoptera
- Suborder: Polyphaga
- Infraorder: Elateriformia
- Family: Clambidae
- Subfamily: Acalyptomerinae
- Genus: Acalyptomerus; Crowson, 1979

= Acalyptomerus =

Genus of beetles

Acalyptomerus is a genus of beetles in the family Clambidae. There are at least two described species in Acalyptomerus.

== Species ==
These two species belong to the genus Acalyptomerus:

- Acalyptomerus asiaticus Crowson, 1979
- Acalyptomerus thayerae Cai & Lawrence, 2019
