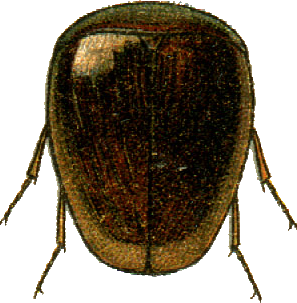
- Calyptomerus alpestris

Scientific classification
- Domain: Eukaryota
- Kingdom: Animalia
- Phylum: Arthropoda
- Class: Insecta
- Order: Coleoptera
- Suborder: Polyphaga
- Infraorder: Elateriformia
- Family: Clambidae
- Genus: Calyptomerus; Redtenbacher, 1849

Synonyms
- Comazus Fairmaire, 1854

= Calyptomerus =

Genus of beetles

Calyptomerus is a genus of minute beetles in the family Clambidae. There are at least three described species in Calyptomerus.

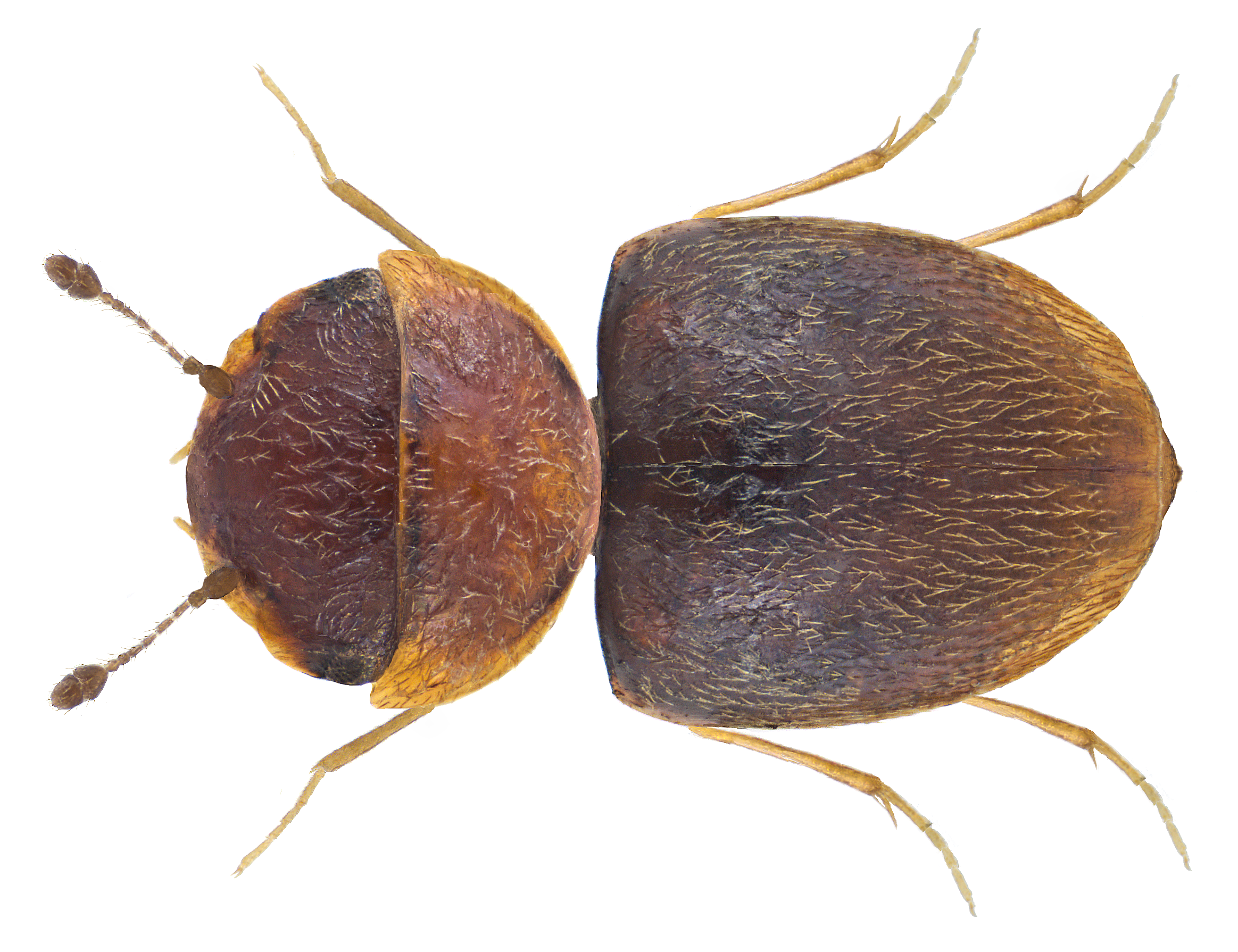
Calyptomerus dubius

== Species ==
These three species belong to the genus Calyptomerus:

- Calyptomerus alpestris Redtenbacher, 1847
- Calyptomerus dubius (Marsham, 1802)
- Calyptomerus oblongulus Mannerheim, 1853
