= Loricaster =

Scientific classification
- Domain: Eukaryota
- Kingdom: Animalia
- Phylum: Arthropoda
- Class: Insecta
- Order: Coleoptera
- Suborder: Polyphaga
- Infraorder: Elateriformia
- Family: Clambidae
- Genus: Loricaster; Mulsant & Rey, 1861

Genus of beetles

Loricaster is a genus of minute beetles in the family Clambidae. There are at least three described species in Loricaster.

== Species ==
These three species belong to the genus Loricaster:

- Loricaster cribripennis Reitter, 1904
- Loricaster rotundus Grigarick & Schuster, 1961
- Loricaster testaceus Mulsant & Rey, 1861
