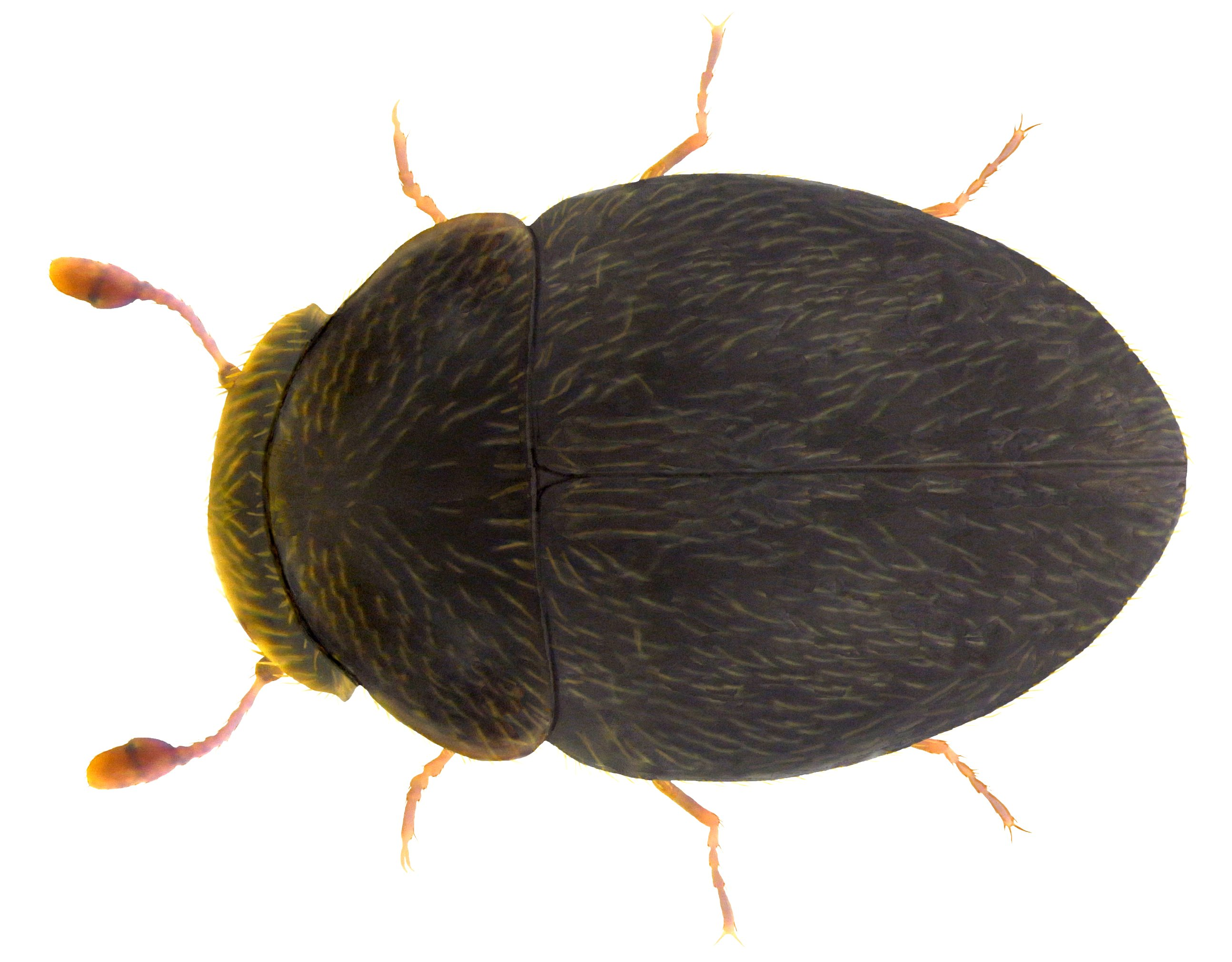
- Clambus armadillo

Scientific classification
- Domain: Eukaryota
- Kingdom: Animalia
- Phylum: Arthropoda
- Class: Insecta
- Order: Coleoptera
- Suborder: Polyphaga
- Infraorder: Elateriformia
- Family: Clambidae
- Genus: Clambus; Fischer, 1820

Synonyms
- Sternuchus LeConte, 1850

= Clambus (beetle) =

Genus of beetles

Clambus is a genus of minute beetles in the family Clambidae. There are at least 30 described species in Clambus.

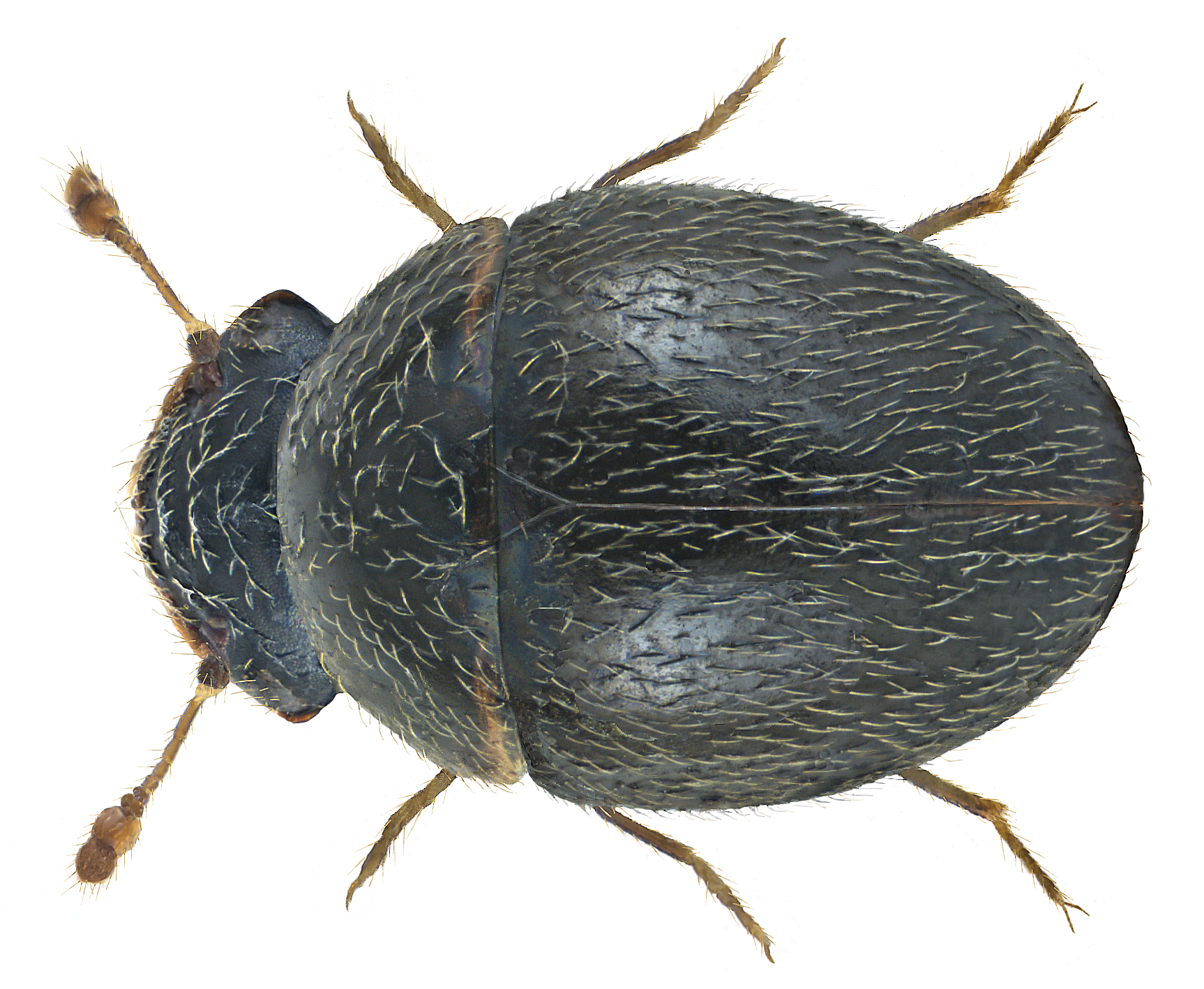
Clambus armadillo

== Species ==
These 32 species belong to the genus Clambus:

- Clambus aegrepilosus Endrödy-Younga, 1960^{g}
- Clambus arizonicus Endrödy-Younga, 1981^{i c g}
- Clambus armadillo (De Geer, 1774)^{i c g b}
- Clambus arnetti Endrödy-Younga, 1981^{i c g}
- Clambus besucheti Endrody-Younga, 1974^{g}
- Clambus caucasus Endrody-Younga, 1960^{g}
- Clambus cilicicus Sahlberg, 1913^{g}
- Clambus dux Endrödy-Younga, 1960^{g}
- Clambus evae Endrödy-Younga, 1960^{g}
- Clambus felix Endrody-Younga, 1960^{g}
- Clambus filii Endrödy-Younga, 1960^{g}
- Clambus formosanus^{g}
- Clambus gibbulus (LeConte, 1850)^{i c g}
- Clambus gibbus Endrody-Younga, 1986^{g}
- Clambus hayekae Endrödy-Younga, 1960^{g}
- Clambus helheimricus Alekseev, 2017^{g}
- Clambus howdeni Endrödy-Younga, 1981^{i c g b}
- Clambus klapperichi Endrody-Younga, 1986^{g}
- Clambus minutus (Sturm, 1807)^{g}
- Clambus nigrellus Reitter, 1914^{g}
- Clambus nigriclavis Stephens, 1835^{g}
- Clambus octobris Endrödy-Younga, 1959^{i c g}
- Clambus pallidulus Reitter, 1911^{g}
- Clambus pilosellus Reitter, 1876^{g}
- Clambus pubescens Redtenbacher, 1849^{i c g b}
- Clambus punctulum (Beck, 1817)^{g}
- Clambus seminulum Horn, 1880^{i c g}
- Clambus simsoni Blackburn, 1902^{g}
- Clambus smetanai Endrödy-Younga, 1981^{i c g}
- Clambus spangleri Endrödy-Younga, 1981^{i c g}
- Clambus tuberculatus Endrody-Younga, 1986^{g}
- Clambus vulneratus LeConte, 1879^{i c g}

Data sources: i = ITIS, c = Catalogue of Life, g = GBIF, b = Bugguide.net
