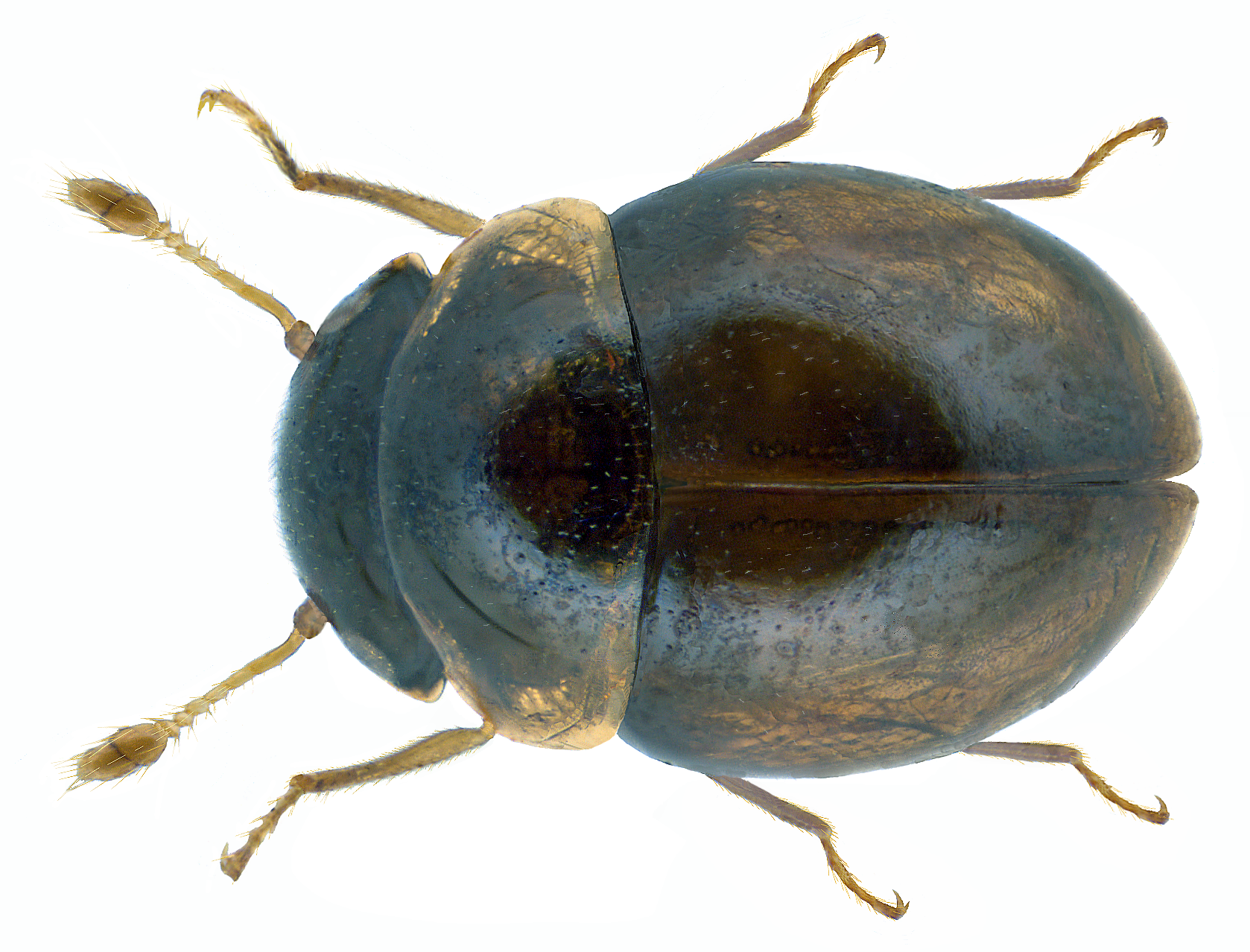
- Clambus punctulum

Scientific classification
- Kingdom: Animalia
- Phylum: Arthropoda
- Clade: Pancrustacea
- Class: Insecta
- Order: Coleoptera
- Suborder: Polyphaga
- Infraorder: Elateriformia
- Superfamily: Scirtoidea
- Family: Clambidae; Fischer, 1821

Genera
- Acalyptomerus; Calyptomerus; Clambus; Loricaster; Sphaerothorax; †Scutacalyptus

Synonyms
- Ptismidae Kirejtshuk & Azar, 2016

= Clambidae =

Clambidae Temporal range: Barremian–Recent

Family of beetles

Clambidae is a family of beetles. They are known commonly as the minute beetles or the fringe-winged beetles. They are found worldwide on every continent except Antarctica.

These are tiny beetles with bodies measuring 0.7 to 2mm in length. They are flattened to convex in shape and some can roll into a ball. Some are hairless, while some are quite hairy or scaly. The margins of the wings are lined with long hairs.

Clambids commonly feed on fungi.

The family is divided into 5 genera and about 70 described species. The largest and most widespread genus is Clambus, which occurs around the world. The genus Sphaerothorax is found in Australia and New Zealand. Acalyptomerus is circumtropical. The latter two genera have undergone long term morphological stasis, with fossils identifiable to both genera being known from the 99 million year old Burmese amber. The oldest records of the group are the extinct genera Eoclambus and Ptisma from the Barremian aged Lebanese amber.
