= 2025 in paleoentomology =

This list of 2025 in paleoentomology records new fossil insect taxa described during the year, as well as documents significant paleoentomology discoveries and events which occurred during that year.

== Clade Amphiesmenoptera ==
=== Lepidopterans ===
Name	Novelty	Status	Authors	Age	Type locality	Country	Notes	Images
Agalope oshikirii	Sp. nov	Valid	Takahashi, Aiba & Sakamaki	Miocene–Pliocene	Sanzugawa Formation	Japan	A member of the family Zygaenidae belonging to the subfamily Chalcosiinae.	
Barthelius	Gen. et sp. nov	Valid	Mey	Eocene	Bitterfeld amber	Germany	A member of Gelechioidea of uncertain affinities. The type species is B. pumilus.	
Eolimenitis	Gen. et sp. nov	Valid	Fischer & Hausmann	Eocene	Baltic amber	Russia (Kaliningrad Oblast)	Taxon established for fossil forms of the subfamily Limenitidinae within the family Nymphalidae. Includes E. baltica, described on the basis of an egg inclusion in amber.	
Falcipalpus	Gen. et 2 sp. nov		Han, Zhang & Ren in Han et al.	Cretaceous	Kachin amber	Myanmar	A member of the family Micropterigidae. The type species is F. rimosus; genus also includes F. parallelus.	
Krutzschius	Gen. et sp. nov	Valid	Mey	Eocene	Bitterfeld amber	Germany	A member of Gelechioidea of uncertain affinities. The type species is K. nanarius.	
Symmoca hoffeinsorum	Sp. nov	Valid	Mey	Eocene	Baltic amber	Europe (Baltic Sea region)	A species of Symmoca.	
Tacola kamitanii	Sp. nov	Valid	Aiba, Takahashi & Saito	Pliocene to Pleistocene	Teragi Group	Japan	A member of the family Nymphalidae belonging to the subfamily Limenitidinae.	

==== Lepidopteran research ====
- A notodontid fossil specimen, providing information on the minimum-age node calibration of the root of Notodontidae for the studies on the timing of butterfly diversification, is described from the Miocene (Burdigalian) strata of the Holešice Member of the Most Formation from the Bílina mine (Czech Republic) by Prokop & Matos-Maraví (2025).

=== Trichopterans ===
Name	Novelty	Status	Authors	Age	Type locality	Country	Notes	Images
Archiphilopotamus sagulicus	Sp. nov	Valid	Sukatsheva in Sukatsheva, Rasnitsyn & Vasilenko	Early Jurassic		Kyrgyzstan	A member of the family Philopotamidae. Published online in 2026, but the issue date is listed as December 2025.	
Baissoferus mongolicus	Sp. nov	Valid	Sukatsheva & Sinitshenkova	Early Cretaceous		Mongolia	A member of the family Baissoferidae.	
Cladochorista uralica	Sp. nov	Valid	Sukatsheva & Sinitshenkova	Permian		Russia (Orenburg Oblast)	A member of the family Cladochoristidae.	
Multimodus yixianensis	Sp. nov	Valid	Chao et al.	Early Cretaceous	Yixian Formation	China	A member of the family Vitimotauliidae.	
Nyctiophylax ispokonvekov	Sp. nov	Valid	Melnitsky, Ivanov & Perkovsky in Melnitsky et al.	Eocene (Priabonian)	Rovno amber	Ukraine	A member of the family Polycentropodidae.	
Plectrocnemia astroblema	Sp. nov	Valid	Melnitsky, Ivanov & Perkovsky in Melnitsky et al.	Eocene (Priabonian)	Rovno amber	Ukraine	A species of Plectrocnemia.	
Plectrocnemia idsukaсhevae	Sp. nov	Valid	Melnitsky, Ivanov & Perkovsky in Melnitsky et al.	Eocene (Priabonian)	Rovno amber	Ukraine	A species of Plectrocnemia.	
Plectrocnemia posleotbora	Sp. nov	Valid	Melnitsky, Ivanov & Perkovsky in Melnitsky et al.	Eocene (Priabonian)	Rovno amber	Ukraine	A species of Plectrocnemia.	
Plectrocnemia stremglav	Sp. nov	Valid	Melnitsky, Ivanov & Perkovsky in Melnitsky et al.	Eocene (Priabonian)	Rovno amber	Ukraine	A species of Plectrocnemia.	
Trichosukatshevia	Gen. et 2 sp. nov	Valid	Chao et al.	Early Cretaceous	Yixian Formation	China	A member of the family Vitimotauliidae. Genus includes new species T. simplex and T. furcivenata.	

==== Trichopteran research ====
- Caddisfly pupae with a morphology distinct from those of members of known Mesozoic trichopteran groups are described from the Barremian Shouchang Formation (Zhejiang, China) by Zhou & Huang (2025).
- Shcherbakov (2025) reinterprets purported thysanuran Planocephalus aselloides from the Eocene Florissant Formation (Colorado, United States) as a hydropsychid caddisfly and a senior synonym of Hydropsyche scudderi.
- Avrithis (2025) describes a forewing of a member of the genus Phryganea from the Vitala area of Kymi (Euboea, Greece), representing the first finding of a fossil caddisfly from the Early Miocene Anatolian landmass.

== Clade Antliophora ==
=== Dipterans ===
==== Brachycerans ====
Name	Novelty	Status	Authors	Age	Type locality	Country	Notes	Images
Acartophthalmites bicolor	Sp. nov	Valid	Roháček	Eocene	Baltic amber	Russia (Kaliningrad Oblast)	A member of Acalyptratae belonging to the family Clusiomitidae.	
Acartophthalmites scotopteryx	Sp. nov	Valid	Roháček	Eocene	Baltic amber	Russia (Kaliningrad Oblast)	A member of Acalyptratae belonging to the family Clusiomitidae.	
Acartophthalmites striatus	Sp. nov	Valid	Roháček	Eocene	Baltic amber	Russia (Kaliningrad Oblast)	A member of Acalyptratae belonging to the family Clusiomitidae.	
Atlatlia angulicauda	Sp. nov	Valid	Bickel in Bickel & Martin	Eocene	Baltic amber	Europe (Baltic Sea region)	A species of Atlatlia.	
Atlatlia corynoura	Sp. nov	Valid	Bickel in Bickel & Martin	Eocene	Baltic amber	Europe (Baltic Sea region)	A species of Atlatlia.	
Atlatlia cryptica	Sp. nov	Valid	Bickel in Bickel & Martin	Eocene	Baltic amber	Europe (Baltic Sea region)	A species of Atlatlia.	
Atlatlia electrica	Sp. nov	Valid	Bickel in Bickel & Martin	Eocene	Baltic amber Bitterfeld amber	Baltic Sea region Germany	A species of Atlatlia.	
Atlatlia licina	Sp. nov	Valid	Bickel in Bickel & Martin	Eocene	Baltic amber	Europe (Baltic Sea region)	A species of Atlatlia.	
Atlatlia penicillata	Sp. nov	Valid	Bickel in Bickel & Martin	Eocene	Baltic amber	Europe (Baltic Sea region)	A species of Atlatlia.	
Atlatlia ramosa	Sp. nov	Valid	Bickel in Bickel & Martin	Eocene	Baltic amber	Europe (Baltic Sea region)	A species of Atlatlia.	
Atlatlia tonsa	Sp. nov	Valid	Bickel in Bickel & Martin	Eocene	Baltic amber	Europe (Baltic Sea region)	A species of Atlatlia.	
Atlatlia ulrichi	Sp. nov	Valid	Bickel in Bickel & Martin	Eocene	Baltic amber Bitterfeld amber	Baltic Sea region Germany	A species of Atlatlia.	
Aulacigaster alabaster	Sp. nov	Valid	Grimaldi	Miocene	Dominican amber	Dominican Republic	A member of the family Aulacigastridae.	
Aulacigaster breviradia	Sp. nov	Valid	Grimaldi	Miocene	Dominican amber	Dominican Republic	A member of the family Aulacigastridae.	
Aulacigaster mathisi	Sp. nov	Valid	Grimaldi	Miocene	Dominican amber	Dominican Republic	A member of the family Aulacigastridae.	
Aulacigaster rungae	Sp. nov	Valid	Grimaldi	Miocene	Dominican amber	Dominican Republic	A member of the family Aulacigastridae.	
Burmatriclis	Gen. et sp. nov	Valid	Miquel et al.	Cretaceous	Kachin amber	Myanmar	A member of the family Asilidae. The type species is B. spinosus.	
Chrysopilus perseverans	Sp. nov	Valid	Zhou et al.	Eocene	Baltic amber	Europe (Baltic Sea region)	A species of Chrysopilus.	
Crevermileo	Gen. et sp. nov		Feng et al.	Cretaceous	Kachin amber	Myanmar	A member of the family Vermileonidae. The type species is C. cnuae.	
Eodromyia rovnoensis	Sp. nov	Valid	Shamshev in Shamshev, Perkovsky & Legalov	Eocene	Rovno amber	Ukraine	A member of the family Hybotidae belonging to the subfamily Tachydromiinae.	
Eoplatypalpus	Gen. et sp. nov	Valid	Shamshev, Vasilenko & Perkovsky	Eocene	Sakhalin amber	Russia (Sakhalin Oblast)	A member of the family Hybotidae. The type species is E. sachalinensis.	
Eridanomyia	Gen. et 2 sp. nov	Valid	Bickel in Bickel & Martin	Eocene	Baltic amber	Europe (Baltic Sea region)	A member of the family Dolichopodidae. The type species is E. conjugalis; genus also includes E. amica.	
Guamaimengia	Gen. et sp. nov		Zhang, Zhang & Zhang	Early Cretaceous	Laiyang Formation	China	A member of the family Eremochaetidae. The type species is G. laiyangensis.	
Hermetia cenoteevani	Sp. nov	Valid	Fachin & Gomes	Miocene	Mexican amber	Mexico	A species of Hermetia.	
Intricodon	Gen. et sp. nov	Valid	Nidergas et al.	Oligocene		France	A hoverfly. The type species is I. cryptodaemoniacus.	
Kashubia	Gen. et 3 sp. nov	Valid	Bickel in Bickel & Martin	Eocene	Baltic amber Bitterfeld amber	Baltic Sea region Germany	A member of the family Dolichopodidae. The type species is K. starki; genus also includes K. falcata and K. ornatipes.	
Lehmhagenia	Gen. et sp. nov	Valid	Zessin	Early Jurassic (Toarcian)	Grimmen Formation	Germany	A member of the family Protobrachyceridae. The type species is L. ansorgei	
Mesembrinella guimaraesi	Sp. nov	Valid	Gomes & Solórzano-Kraemer	Miocene	Mexican amber	Mexico	A species of Mesembrinella.	
Meunieromyia	Gen. et comb. nov	Valid	Grichanov	Eocene	Baltic amber	Europe (Baltic Sea region)	A member of the family Dolichopodidae. The type species is "Argyra" deceptoria Meunier (1907).	
Microphorites complanipedis	Sp. nov	Valid	Zhang & Wang in Zhang et al.	Cretaceous		Myanmar		
Microphorites curtipedis	Sp. nov	Valid	Zhang & Wang in Zhang et al.	Cretaceous		Myanmar		
Microphorites hamataculeus	Sp. nov	Valid	Zhang & Wang in Zhang et al.	Cretaceous		Myanmar		
Mythenteles evenhuisi	Sp. nov	Valid	Perkovsky et al.	Eocene	Rovno amber	Ukraine	A member of the family Mythicomyiidae.	
Palaeomedeterus manukyani	Sp. nov	Valid	Grichanov	Eocene	Baltic amber	Russia (Kaliningrad Oblast)	A member of the family Dolichopodidae.	
Palaeomedeterus subignavus	Sp. nov	Valid	Grichanov	Eocene	Baltic amber	Russia (Kaliningrad Oblast)	A member of the family Dolichopodidae.	
Palaeomedeterus sublentus	Sp. nov	Valid	Grichanov	Eocene	Baltic amber	Russia (Kaliningrad Oblast)	A member of the family Dolichopodidae.	
Paleoglutops	Gen. et sp. nov	Valid	Engel, Gross & Nel	Miocene	Paldau Formation	Austria	A member of the family Pelecorhynchidae or Oreoleptidae. The type species is P. styriensis.	
Protanthomyza chelicerata	Sp. nov	Valid	Roháček	Eocene	Baltic amber	Russia (Kaliningrad Oblast)	A member of Acalyptratae belonging to the family Protanthomyzidae.	
Spilomyia kvaceki	Sp. nov		Daňková et al.	Oligocene		Czech Republic	A species of Spilomyia.	

==== Nematocerans ====
Name	Novelty	Status	Authors	Age	Type locality	Country	Notes	Images
Bryophaenocladius zealandiae	Sp. nov	Valid	Baranov in Baranov et al.	Oligocene (Chattian)	Pomahaka Formation	New Zealand	A species of Bryophaenocladius.	
Cheilotrichia gallica	Sp. nov	Valid	Kopeć, Krzemiński & Kania-Kłosok in Kopeć et al.	Eocene (Ypresian)	Oise amber	France	A species of Cheilotrichia.	
Cheilotrichia oisensis	Sp. nov	Valid	Kopeć, Krzemiński & Kania-Kłosok in Kopeć et al.	Eocene (Ypresian)	Oise amber	France	A species of Cheilotrichia.	
Cretosabethes	Gen. et sp. nov		Amaral & Borkent in Amaral et al.	Cretaceous	Kachin amber	Myanmar	A mosquito. The type species is C. primaevus.	
Dicranomyia podenasi	Sp. nov	Valid	Kopeć, Krzemiński & Kania-Kłosok in Kopeć et al.	Eocene (Ypresian)	Oise amber	France	A species of Dicranomyia.	
Dilophus anasiformis	Comb. nov	Valid	(Dürrenfeldt)	Pliocene		Germany	A species of Dilophus; moved from Bibio anasiformis Dürrenfeldt (1968).	
Dilophus duerrenfeldti	Nom. nov	Valid	Skartveit, Kaulfuss & Gehler	Pliocene		Germany	A species of Dilophus; a replacement name for Bibio tenuis Dürrenfeldt (1968).	
Dilophus flavipes	Sp. nov	Valid	Skartveit, Kaulfuss & Gehler	Pliocene		Germany	A species of Dilophus.	
Dilophus plionanus	Sp. nov	Valid	Skartveit, Kaulfuss & Gehler	Pliocene		Germany	A species of Dilophus.	
Dipterodictya elongata	Sp. nov	Valid	Krzemiński, Krzemińska & Kania-Kłosok	Early Jurassic		Kyrgyzstan	A member of the family Limoniidae.	
Ectrepesthoneura arturi	Sp. nov	Valid	Bechev	Eocene	Baltic amber	Poland	A species of Ectrepesthoneura.	
Electrocera	Gen. et sp. nov	Valid	Pełczyńska & Soszyńska in Pełczyńska et al.	Cretaceous		Myanmar	A member of the family Keroplatidae belonging to the subfamily Macrocerinae. The type species is E. prima; genus also includes E. payini.	
Ellipteroides (Jantares) hansi	Sp. nov	Valid	Kania-Kłosok et al.	Eocene	Baltic amber	Europe (Baltic Sea region)	A species of Ellipteroides.	
Eokelneria	Gen. et sp. nov	Disputed	Hebert, Ngô Muller & Nel	Eocene (Ypresian)	Oise amber	France	A member of the family Keroplatidae belonging to the subfamily Macrocerinae. The type species is E. oisensis. Pełczyńska et al. (2026) considered Eokelneria to be a junior synonym of the genus Kelneria, thought the authors maintained E. oisensis as a distinct species within the latter genus.	
Eoptychoptera pilosa	Sp. nov	Valid	He & Liu	Middle Jurassic	Daohugou Beds	China	A member of the family Ptychopteridae.	
?Katatopygia cerestensis	Sp. nov		Hébert et al.	Oligocene		France	A member of the family Mycetophilidae.	
Larvaderus	Gen. et sp. nov	Valid	Lukashevich & Ansorge	Late Triassic (Norian)		Germany	A member of the family Tanyderidae. The type species is L. triassicus.	
Leptosciarella jucheti	Sp. nov	Valid	(Camier & Nel)	Eocene (Ypresian)	Oise amber	France	A member of the family Sciaridae belonging to the subfamily Sciarinae; moved from Sciara jucheti Camier & Nel (2019).	
Leptosciarella menzeli	Sp. nov	Valid	Hebert, Ngô Muller & Nel	Eocene (Ypresian)	Oise amber	France	A member of the family Sciaridae belonging to the subfamily Sciarinae.	
Longiphlebes	Gen. et sp. nov	Valid	Kaczmarek et al.	Late Cretaceous (Cenomanian)	Kachin amber	Myanmar	A member of the family Psychodidae belonging to the subfamily Phlebotominae and the tribe Hertigiini. The type species is L. excelsior.	
Macrocera minor	Comb. nov	Valid	(Blagoderov & Arillo)	Early Cretaceous (Albian)	Álava amber	Spain	A species of Macrocera; moved from Hegalari minor Blagoderov & Arillo (2002).	
Macrocera pawli	Sp. nov	Valid	Pełczyńska et al.	Cretaceous		Myanmar	A species of Macrocera.	
Macrocera sevciki	Sp. nov	Valid	Pełczyńska et al.	Cretaceous		Myanmar	A species of Macrocera.	
Macrocera vonneguti	Sp. nov	Valid	Pełczyńska et al.	Cretaceous		Myanmar	A species of Macrocera.	
Palaeoglaesum skibinskae	Sp. nov	Valid	Kaczmarek, Krzemiński & Soszyńska	Cretaceous	Kachin amber	Myanmar	A member of the family Psychodidae.	
Penthetria tenue	Sp. nov	Valid	Skartveit et al.	Cretaceous		Myanmar	A species of Penthetria.	
Penthetria tipuloides	Sp. nov	Valid	Skartveit et al.	Cretaceous		Myanmar	A species of Penthetria.	
Praearchitipula procera	Sp. nov	Valid	Wang & Liu	Middle Jurassic	Jiulongshan Formation	China	A member of the family Pediciidae.	
Proptychopterina asticta	Sp. nov	Valid	He & Liu	Middle Jurassic	Daohugou Beds	China	A member of the family Ptychopteridae.	
Protopenthetria bicoloripes	Sp. nov	Valid	Skartveit et al.	Cretaceous		Myanmar	A member of the family Bibionidae.	
Protopenthetria coronata	Sp. nov	Valid	Skartveit et al.	Cretaceous		Myanmar	A member of the family Bibionidae.	
Protopenthetria crassitarsalis	Sp. nov	Valid	Skartveit et al.	Cretaceous		Myanmar	A member of the family Bibionidae.	
Protopenthetria globistylus	Sp. nov	Valid	Skartveit et al.	Cretaceous		Myanmar	A member of the family Bibionidae.	
Protopenthetria longicornis	Sp. nov	Valid	Skartveit et al.	Cretaceous		Myanmar	A member of the family Bibionidae.	
Protopenthetria pallipes	Sp. nov	Valid	Skartveit et al.	Cretaceous		Myanmar	A member of the family Bibionidae.	
Protopenthetria rectangula	Sp. nov	Valid	Skartveit et al.	Cretaceous		Myanmar	A member of the family Bibionidae.	
Pterosis extinctus	Sp. nov	Valid	Baranov in Baranov et al.	Oligocene (Chattian)	Pomahaka Formation	New Zealand	A member of the family Chironomidae.	
Rhabdomastix rafali	Sp. nov	Valid	Jordan-Stasiło, Kania-Kłosok & Krzemiński	Eocene	Baltic amber	Europe (Baltic Sea region)	A species of Rhabdomastix.	
Rhabdomastix setosa	Sp. nov	Valid	Jordan-Stasiło, Kania-Kłosok & Krzemiński	Eocene	Baltic amber	Europe (Baltic Sea region)	A species of Rhabdomastix.	
Rhabdomastix woottoni	Sp. nov	Valid	Jordan-Stasiło, Kania-Kłosok & Krzemiński	Eocene	Cottbus Formation (Bitterfeld amber)	Germany	A species of Rhabdomastix.	
Silanowicki	Gen. et sp. nov	Valid	Krzemiński, Kania-Kłosok & Wąsacz	Cretaceous		Myanmar	A member of the family Limoniidae belonging to the subfamily Chioneinae. The type species is S. burmiticus.	
Simulipupa	Gen. et sp. nov	Valid	Lukashevich & Ansorge	Late Triassic (Norian)		Germany	A black fly. The type species is S. curriei.	
Sylvicola vacherensis	Sp. nov	Valid	Hebert et al.	Oligocene		France	A species of Sylvicola.	
Tega germanica	Sp. nov	Valid	Lukashevich & Ansorge	Early Jurassic (Toarcian)	Grimmen Formation; Posidonia Shale	Germany	A member of the family Anisopodidae.	
Tega sibirica	Sp. nov	Valid	Lukashevich & Ansorge	Middle Jurassic (Bathonian)	Itat Formation	Russia	A member of the family Anisopodidae.	
Tega storozhenkoi	Sp. nov	Valid	Lukashevich & Ansorge	Middle Jurassic (Bathonian)	Itat Formation	Russia	A member of the family Anisopodidae.	
Tega thuyi	Sp. nov	Valid	Lukashevich & Ansorge	Early Jurassic (Toarcian)	Posidonia Shale	Luxembourg	A member of the family Anisopodidae.	
Telmatomyia	Gen. et sp. nov		Baranov et al.	Late Jurassic	Talbragar Fossil Fish Bed	Australia	A member of the family Chironomidae belonging to the subfamily Podonominae. The type species is T. talbragarica.	
Tipunia ningchengensis	Sp. nov	Valid	Wang & Liu	Middle Jurassic	Jiulongshan Formation	China	A member of the family Tipulidae.	
Trentepohlia chiapaneca	Sp. nov	Valid	Santos, Córdova-Tabares & Gomes	Miocene	Mexican amber	Mexico	A species of Trentepohlia.	
Trentepohlia xenena	Sp. nov	Valid	Santos, Córdova-Tabares & Gomes	Miocene	Mexican amber	Mexico	A species of Trentepohlia.	
Xenophlebotomites	Gen. et sp. nov		Azar & Maksoud	Early Cretaceous (Barremian)	Lebanese amber	Lebanon	A member of the family Psychodidae belonging to the subfamily Phlebotominae. The type species is X. eliei.	

==== Other dipterans ====
Name	Novelty	Status	Authors	Age	Type locality	Country	Notes	Images
Ramobuccina	Gen. et sp. nov	Valid	Lukashevich & Ansorge	Late Triassic (Norian)		Germany	A fly of uncertain affinities. The type species is R. herrigi.	

==== Dipteran research ====
- Fossil material of a mosquito, representing the first record of the family in the Araripe Basin and interpreted as the oldest record of the subfamily Anophelinae, is described from the Lower Cretaceous Crato Formation (Brazil) by Oliveira et al. (2025).
- Redescription of Aetheapnomyia hoffeinsorum, based on data from a new specimen from the Eocene Rovno amber (Ukraine), is published by Zakrzewska et al. (2025).
- Tabakian (2025) reviews the fossil record of psychodid flies described from the Lower Cretaceous Lebanese amber.
- Herbert et al. (2025) revise the wing morphology in extant and fossil members of the family Phoridae, and present a new interpretation of the wing vein terminology of members of this group.

=== Mecopterans ===
Name	Novelty	Status	Authors	Age	Type locality	Location	Notes	Images
Antiquanabittacus punctatus	Sp. nov		Yu, Ren, Lin & Yang in Yu et al.	Middle Jurassic		China	A hangingfly.	
Composibittacus retroflexus	Sp. nov		Yu, Ren, Lin & Yang in Yu et al.	Middle Jurassic		China	A hangingfly.	
Ctenobittacus	Nom. nov	Valid	Villet	Middle Triassic	Tongchuan Formation	China	A hangingfly; a replacement name for Ctenophlebia Hong (2009).	
Formosibittacus multifarius	Sp. nov		Yu, Ren, Lin & Yang in Yu et al.	Middle Jurassic		China	A hangingfly.	
Itaphlebia yulinensis	Sp. nov		Xu et al.	Middle Jurassic	Yanan Formation	China	A member of the family Nannochoristidae.	
Mesochorista tillyardi	Sp. nov	Valid	Lian & Huang in Lian et al.	Permian (Capitanian)	Yinping Formation	China	A member of the family Permochoristidae.	
Mesochorista yinpingensis	Sp. nov	Valid	Lian & Huang in Lian et al.	Permian (Capitanian)	Yinping Formation	China	A member of the family Permochoristidae.	
Orthophlebia xiangyu	Sp. nov	Valid	Lian	Triassic	Yanchang Formation	China	A member of the family Orthophlebiidae.	
Parachorista elegantula	Sp. nov	Valid	Lian	Triassic	Yanchang Formation	China	A member of Panorpoidea belonging to the family Parachoristidae.	
Parachorista hongi	Sp. nov	Valid	Lian	Triassic	Yanchang Formation	China	A member of Panorpoidea belonging to the family Parachoristidae.	
Parachorista libaii	Sp. nov	Valid	Lian	Triassic	Yanchang Formation	China	A member of Panorpoidea belonging to the family Parachoristidae.	
Parachorista orienta	Sp. nov	Valid	Lian	Triassic	Yanchang Formation	China	A member of Panorpoidea belonging to the family Parachoristidae.	
Parachorista pulchra	Sp. nov	Valid	Lian	Triassic	Yanchang Formation	China	A member of Panorpoidea belonging to the family Parachoristidae.	
Parachorista ruga	Sp. nov	Valid	Lian	Triassic	Yanchang Formation	China	A member of Panorpoidea belonging to the family Parachoristidae.	
Parachorista triassica	Sp. nov	Valid	Lian	Triassic	Yanchang Formation	China	A member of Panorpoidea belonging to the family Parachoristidae.	
Petrulebittacus	Gen. et sp. nov		Machado, Bueno & Ribeiro	Early Cretaceous	Crato Formation	Brazil	A hangingfly. The type species is P. martinsnetoi.	
Protorthophlebia prajna	Sp. nov	Valid	Lian	Triassic	Yanchang Formation	China	A member of Panorpoidea belonging to the family Protorthophlebiidae.	
Sinoparachorista magna	Sp. nov	Valid	Lian	Triassic	Yanchang Formation	China	A member of Panorpoidea belonging to the family Parachoristidae.	
Sinorthophlebia	Gen. et sp. nov	Valid	Lian	Early Cretaceous (Valanginian–Hauterivian)	Dabeigou Formation	China	A member of the family Orthophlebiidae. The type species is S. weichangensis.	
Vitimopsyche picta	Sp. nov		Xu et al.	Middle Jurassic	Yangshuzhuan Formation	China	A member of the family Mesopsychidae.	

==== Mecopteran research ====
- Probable permochoristid forewing, representing the first Triassic insect from Antarctica reported to date, is described from the Section Peak Formation in Victoria Land by Lara et al. (2025).

=== Siphonapterans ===
Name	Novelty	Status	Authors	Age	Type locality	Location	Notes	Images
Pulicophoenix	Gen. et sp. nov	Valid	Traub	Eocene-Oligocene	Dominican amber	Dominican Republic	A flea belonging to the family Rhopalopsyllidae. Genus includes new species P. succinus.	

== Clade Archaeorthoptera ==
=== †Caloneurodea ===
Name	Novelty	Status	Authors	Age	Type locality	Country	Notes	Images
Euthygramma storozhenkoi	Sp. nov	Valid	Rasnitsyn	Permian	Kulchumovo Formation	Russia (Orenburg Oblast)	A member of the family Caloneuridae.	

=== Orthopterans ===
Name	Novelty	Status	Authors	Age	Type locality	Country	Notes	Images
Abaddonella	Gen. et sp. nov	Valid	Schall, Heads & Husemann	Cretaceous	Kachin amber or Hkamti amber	Myanmar	A member of the family Ripipterygidae. The type species is A. nwarrngaal.	
Adelphellca	Gen. et sp. et comb. nov	Junior synonym	Schall, Kotthoff & Husemann	Cretaceous	Hkamti amber or Kachin amber	Myanmar	A member of the family Elcanidae. The type species is A. simplicissima; genus also includes "Probaisselcana" zhengi Gu et al. (2022). The genus was subsequently considered to be a junior synonym of the genus Paraxelcana by Schall, Kotthoff & Husemann (2026).	
Aestuacrida	Gen. et sp. nov	Valid	Schall et al.	Early Cretaceous	Crato Formation	Brazil	A member of the family Locustopsidae. Genus includes new species A. stereofemoris.	
Araripelocusta imperatrix	Sp. nov	Valid	Schall et al.	Early Cretaceous	Crato Formation	Brazil	A member of the family Locustopsidae.	
Burmecaelinus yungyenwangae	Sp. nov	Valid	Schall et al.	Cretaceous		Myanmar	A member of the family Burmecaelidae.	
Burmeumastax	Gen. et sp. nov	Valid	Husemann et al.	Cretaceous	Hkamti amber or Kachin amber	Myanmar	A member Eumastacoidea, possibly belonging to the family Eumastacidae. The type species is B. lexiae.	
Ciconipteryx	Gen. et sp. nov	Valid	Schall, Cao & Husemann	Cretaceous	Hkamti amber or Kachin amber	Myanmar	A member of the family Ripipterygidae. The type species is C. bidactylus.	
Cratolocustopsis aquila	Sp. nov	Valid	Schall et al.	Early Cretaceous	Crato Formation	Brazil	A member of the family Locustopsidae.	
Duappendactylus	Gen. et sp. nov	Valid	Schall, Gu & Husemann	Cretaceous		Myanmar	A member of the family Tridactylidae. The type species is D. melanocephalus.	
Elcanodentes	Gen. et 3 sp. nov		Willmott et al.	Cretaceous		Myanmar	A member of the family Elcanidae. The type species is E. alatus; genus also includes E. cretaceus and E. thanatos.	
Ellca oblica	Sp. nov	Valid	Li et al.	Cretaceous	Kachin amber	Myanmar	A member of the family Elcanidae.	
Fortigryllus	Gen. et sp. nov	Valid	Ji et al.	Cretaceous	Kachin amber	Myanmar	A member of Gryllidea of uncertain affinities, possibly a member of the stem group of the family Phalangopsidae. The type species is F. xiangrui.	
Hiemalidactylus	Gen. et sp. nov	Valid	Schall, Gu & Husemann	Cretaceous		Myanmar	A member of the family Tridactylidae. The type species is H. eileenae.	
Kachinelcana	Gen. et sp. nov	Valid	Li et al.	Cretaceous	Kachin amber	Myanmar	A member of the family Elcanidae. Genus includes new species K. elongata.	
Kolymbelcana	Gen. et sp. nov	Valid	Schall, Kotthoff & Husemann	Cretaceous	Hkamti amber or Kachin amber	Myanmar	A member of the family Elcanidae. The type species is K. phantasma.	
Locustopsis elongatus	Comb. nov	Valid	(Nel & Huang)	Middle Jurassic	Yanan Formation	China	A member of the family Locustopsidae; moved from Sinolocustopsis elongatus Nel & Huang (2024).	
Longipectus	Gen. et sp. nov	Valid	Yu, Liu & Liu	Cretaceous		Myanmar	A member of the family Elcanidae. Genus includes new species L. circulus.	
Mesolocustopsis brevis	Comb. nov	Valid	(Nel & Huang)	Middle Jurassic	Yanan Formation	China	A member of the family Locustopsidae; moved from Sinolocustopsis brevis Nel & Huang (2024).	
Mesolocustopsis morrisonensis	Comb. nov	Valid	(Smith et al)	Late Jurassic	Morrison Formation	United States (Colorado)	A member of the family Locustopsidae; moved from Parapleurites morrisonensis Smith et al. (2011).	
Naginipteryx	Gen. et sp. nov	Valid	Schall, Heads & Husemann	Cretaceous	Kachin amber or Hkamti amber	Myanmar	A member of the superfamily Tridactyloidea. The type species is N. pinna.	
Ozymandipteryx	Gen. et sp. nov	Valid	Schall, Cao & Husemann	Cretaceous	Hkamti amber or Kachin amber	Myanmar	A member of the family Ripipterygidae. The type species is O. campana.	
Panorpidium stenos	Sp. nov	Valid	Yu, Liu & Liu	Cretaceous		Myanmar	A member of the family Elcanidae.	
Parapleurites brasiliensis	Sp. nov	Valid	Schall et al.	Early Cretaceous	Crato Formation	Brazil	A member of the family Locustopsidae.	
Protomogoplistes inflatus	Sp. nov	Valid	Ji et al.	Cretaceous	Kachin amber	Myanmar	A member of the family Mogoplistidae.	
Pseudopanorpidium	Gen. et comb. nov		Willmott et al.	Cretaceous	Kachin amber	Myanmar	A member of the family Elcanidae. The type species is "Panorpidium" maculosum Zhou et al. (2022).	
Sinagryllus huangi	Sp. nov	Valid	Xu et al.	Middle Jurassic	Yanan Formation	China	A member of the family Baissogryllidae. First online December 2025; Officially published January 2026	
Pseudoprobaisselcana	Gen. et comb. nov		Willmott et al.	Cretaceous	Kachin amber	Myanmar	A member of the family Elcanidae. The type species is "Probaisselcana" oculata Hu & He (2023).	
Yakkhapipteryx	Gen. et comb. nov	Valid	Schall, Cao & Husemann	Cretaceous	Kachin amber	Myanmar	A member of the family Ripipterygidae. The type species is "Magnidactylus" mirus Gu, Zheng, Cao & Yue in Gu et al. (2022); genus also includes "Magnidactylus" gracilis Gu, Zheng, Cao & Yue in Gu et al. (2022).	

==== Orthopteran research ====
- Evidence of mimicry involving evolution of color patterns of forewings resembling coloration of co-occurring bennettitalean leaves is reported in prophalangopsids from the Middle Jurassic Haifanggou Formation (China) by Fu et al. (2025).
- A baissogryllid specimen preserved with an ovary (representing the first known record of an ovary in an orthopteran fossil) is described from the Lower Cretaceous Crato Formation (Brazil) by Dias et al. (2025).

== Clade Coleopterida ==
=== Coleopterans ===
==== Adephaga ====
Name	Novelty	Status	Authors	Age	Type locality	Country	Notes	Images
Archaeodyschirius	Gen. et sp. nov	Valid	Molino-Olmedo	Cretaceous		Myanmar	A ground beetle belonging to the subfamily Scaritinae and the tribe Dyschiriini. The type species is A. misiae. Published online in 2026, but the issue date is listed as December 2025.	
Calosoma winnicaensis	Sp. nov	Valid	Nel et al.	Oligocene	Menilite Formation	Poland	A species of Calosoma.	
Copelatus chiapas	Sp. nov	Valid	Hájek et al.	Miocene	Mexican amber	Mexico	A species of Copelatus.	
Harpalus mckayi	Sp. nov	Valid	Mnguni in McKay & Mnguni	Late Cretaceous (Cenomanian-Campanian, possibly Turonian)		Botswana	A species of Harpalus.	
Harpalus mnguni	Sp. nov	Valid	McKay in McKay & Mnguni	Late Cretaceous (Cenomanian-Campanian, possibly Turonian)		Botswana	A species of Harpalus.	
Harpalus nkqwili	Sp. nov	Valid	McKay & Mnguni	Late Cretaceous (Cenomanian-Campanian, possibly Turonian)		Botswana	A species of Harpalus.	
Harpalus peteni	Sp. nov	Valid	McKay & Mnguni	Late Cretaceous (Cenomanian-Campanian, possibly Turonian)		Botswana	A species of Harpalus.	
Quasicalathus uncinatus	Sp. nov	Valid	Schmidt & Scholz	Eocene	Baltic amber	Europe (Baltic Sea region)	A ground beetle.	

==== Archostemata ====
Name	Novelty	Status	Authors	Age	Type locality	Country	Notes	Images
Alisacupes	Gen. et sp. nov	Valid	Yan, Felker & Strelnikova	Early Triassic	Nidym Formation	Russia (Krasnoyarsk Krai)	A member of the family Asiocoleidae. The type species is A. dunaevi.	
Anakitium	Gen. et sp. nov	Valid	Arakelyan & Yan in Arakelyan et al.	Early Triassic	Bugarikhta Formation	Russia (Krasnoyarsk Krai)	A member of the family Asiocoleidae. The type species is A. storozhenkoi.	
Apriacma acoronata	Sp. nov	Valid	Gui & Cai in Gui et al.	Early Cretaceous	Jiufotang Formation	China	A member of the family Cupedidae.	
Schizocoleus frumentum	Sp. nov	Valid	Yan, Felker & Strelnikova	Early Triassic	Nidym Formation	Russia (Krasnoyarsk Krai)	A member of the family Schizocoleidae.	
Schizocoleus maximus	Sp. nov	Valid	Yan, Felker & Strelnikova	Early Triassic	Nidym Formation	Russia (Krasnoyarsk Krai)	A member of the family Schizocoleidae.	
Schizocoleus subtilis	Sp. nov	Valid	Yan, Felker & Strelnikova	Early Triassic	Nidym Formation	Russia (Krasnoyarsk Krai)	A member of the family Schizocoleidae.	
Uskatocoleus turensis	Sp. nov	Valid	Yan, Felker & Strelnikova	Early Triassic	Nidym Formation	Russia (Krasnoyarsk Krai)	A member of the family Schizocoleidae.	

==== Polyphaga ====
===== Bostrichiformia =====
Name	Novelty	Status	Authors	Age	Type locality	Country	Notes	Images
Attagenus motykai	Sp. nov	Valid	Háva	Late Cretaceous (Cenomanian)	Kachin amber	Myanmar	A species of Attagenus.	
Burmostrichus	Gen. et sp. nov	Valid	Háva & Zahradník	Late Cretaceous (Cenomanian)	Kachin amber	Myanmar	A member of the family Bostrichidae. The type species is B. brunneus.	
Cacotemnus succinophilus	Sp. nov	Valid	Alekseev & Bukejs	Eocene	Baltic amber	Russia (Kaliningrad Oblast)	A species of Cacotemnus.	
Costatomorphus	Gen. et sp. nov	Valid	Háva & Zahradník	Late Cretaceous (Cenomanian)	Kachin amber	Myanmar	A member of the family Ptinidae belonging to the subfamily Eucradinae. The type species is C. cretaceus.	
Dermestes lawrencei	Sp. nov	Valid	Ślipiński, Ren & Zhou	Cretaceous	Kachin amber	Myanmar	A species of Dermestes.	
Globicornis burmanicus	Sp. nov	Valid	Háva	Late Cretaceous (Cenomanian)	Kachin amber	Myanmar	A species of Globicornis.	
Globicornis vitusberingi	Sp. nov	Valid	Legalov et al.	Eocene	Danish amber	Denmark	A species of Globicornis.	
Granulobium perkovskyi	Sp. nov	Valid	Legalov in Legalov & Legalov	Late Cretaceous (Cenomanian)	Kachin amber	Myanmar	A member of the family Ptinidae belonging to the subfamily Eucradinae and the tribe Hedobiini.	
Megatoma turonianensis	Comb. nov		(Peris & Háva)	Late Cretaceous (Turonian)	New Jersey amber	United States (New Jersey)	A member of the family Dermestidae, possibly a species of Megatoma; moved from Attagenus (Aethriostoma) turonianensis Peris & Háva (2016).	
Nothattagenus secundus	Comb. nov		(Deng et al.)	Cretaceous	Kachin amber	Myanmar	A member of the family Dermestidae; moved from Attagenus secundus Deng et al. (2017).	
Orphilus dudkoi	Sp. nov	Valid	Lyubarsky & Perkovsky in Legalov et al.	Eocene	Baltic amber	Russia (Kaliningrad Oblast)	A species of Orphilus.	
Stephanopachys cretaceus	Sp. nov	Valid	Háva	Late Cretaceous (Cenomanian)	Kachin amber	Myanmar	A species of Stephanopachys.	
Toxesbium	Gen. et sp. nov	Valid	Li, Philips & Cai in Li et al.	Cretaceous	Kachin amber	Myanmar	A member of the family Ptinidae belonging to the subfamily Ernobiinae. The type species is T. kundratai.	

===== Cucujiformia =====
Name	Novelty	Status	Authors	Age	Type locality	Country	Notes	Images
Amelyris	Gen. et 7 sp. nov	Valid	Tshernyshev et al.	Eocene	Baltic amber Danish amber Rovno amber	Denmark; Russia (Kaliningrad Oblast); Ukraine	A member of the family Melyridae. Genus includes A. sveneldi, A. elongatus, A. tricarinatus, A. paucidentatus, A. lupatus, A. groehni and A. jutlandicus.	
Anaspis solodovnikovi	Sp. nov	Valid	Telnov & Perkovsky	Eocene	Rovno amber	Ukraine	A species of Anaspis.	
Anomalocys	Gen. et sp. nov	Valid	Legalov & Perkovsky in Legalov, Vasilenko & Perkovsky	Eocene	Danish amber	Denmark	A member of the family Ciidae. The type species is A. lawrencei.	
Archistrophus	Gen. et sp. nov	Valid	Jiang & Chen	Cretaceous	Kachin amber	Myanmar	A member of the family Tetratomidae. The type species is A. filicornis.	
Burmoptarthrus	Gen. et sp. nov	Valid	Legalov	Late Cretaceous (Cenomanian)	Kachin amber	Myanmar	A member of the family Nemonychidae. The type species is B. storozhenkoi.	
Cratovorus	Gen. et sp. nov		Batelka et al.	Early Cretaceous	Crato Formation	Brazil	A member of the family Ripiphoridae. The type species is R. archaicus.	
Cretoscraptella	Gen. et sp. nov	Valid	Alekseev, Háva & Bukejs	Cretaceous	Kachin amber	Myanmar	A member of the family Scraptiidae. The type species is C. crucifera.	
Cretostenotarsus elongatus	Sp. nov		Hsiao & Tomaszewska	Late Cretaceous (Cenomanian)	Kachin amber	Myanmar	A member of the family Endomychidae.	
Danae sembanata	Sp. nov	Valid	Alekseev & Tomaszewska	Eocene	Baltic amber	Russia (Kaliningrad Oblast)	A species of Danae.	
Danophaea	Gen. et sp. nov	Valid	Legalov & Perkovsky in Legalov, Vasilenko & Perkovsky	Eocene	Danish amber	Denmark	A member of the family Mycetophagidae belonging to the tribe Mycetophagini. The type species is D. cimbrica.	
Derinilipia	Gen. et sp. nov	Valid	Li, Huang & Cai	Cretaceous (Albian to Cenomanian)	Kachin amber	Myanmar	A member of the family Ripiphoridae belonging to the subfamily Ripidiinae and the tribe Ripidiini. The type species is D. alekseevi.	
Eoractocetinus	Gen. et comb. nov	Valid	Kirejtshuk	Cretaceous (Albian-Cenomanian)	Kachin amber	Myanmar	A member of the family Lymexylidae. The type species is "Raractocetus" fossilis Yamamoto (2019); genus also includes "Raractocetus" extinctus Yamamoto (2019).	
Eoractocetus	Gen. et sp. nov	Valid	Kirejtshuk	Eocene	Baltic amber	Europe (Baltic Sea region)	A member of the family Lymexylidae. The type species is E. storozhenkoi.	
Europs carsteni	Sp. nov	Valid	Alekseev & Bukejs	Eocene	Baltic amber	Russia (Kaliningrad Oblast)	A species of Europs.	
Glabracula	Gen. et sp. et comb. nov		Nabozhenko, Alekseev & Bukejs	Eocene	Baltic amber Rovno amber	Russia (Kaliningrad Oblast); Ukraine	A darkling beetle belonging to the subfamily Alleculinae. The type species is G. groehni from the Baltic amber; genus also includes "Oracula" campbelli Nabozhenko & Perkovsky (2023) from the Rovno amber.	
Jiricateres	Gen. et 3 sp. et comb. nov	Valid	Tshernyshev et al.	Eocene	Baltic amber Rovno amber	Russia (Kaliningrad Oblast); Ukraine	A member of the family Lophocateridae. The type species is J. ukrainicus; genus also includes J. damzeni (both from Rovno amber) and J. storozhenkoi, as well as "Promanodes" alleni Kolibáč (2011; both from Baltic amber).	
Khasurtyphilus	Gen. et sp. nov	Valid	Lyubarsky & Perkovsky in Lyubarsky et al.	Early Cretaceous		Russia	A member of the family Erotylidae. The type species is K. storozhenkoi.	
Ligaschonus	Gen. et sp. nov	Valid	Alekseev, Pankowski & Bukejs	Eocene	Baltic amber	Russia (Kaliningrad Oblast)	A member of the family Trogossitidae. The type species is L. succiniripae.	
Lobanoviella lethebibens	Sp. nov	Valid	Alekseev, Kirejtshuk & Bukejs	Eocene	Baltic amber Rovno amber	Baltic Sea region Ukraine	A member of the family Megalopodidae belonging to the subfamily Palophaginae.	
Lymexylopsis	Gen. et comb. nov	Valid	Kirejtshuk	Eocene	Baltic amber Rovno amber	Russia (Kaliningrad Oblast); Ukraine	A member of the family Lymexylidae. The type species is "Raractocetus" balticus Yamamoto (2019); genus also includes "Raractocetus" sverlilo Nazarenko, Perkovsky & Yamamoto in Yamamoto et al. (2022).	
Mesohelotopsis	Gen. et comb. nov	Valid	Kirejtshuk	Cretaceous		Myanmar	A member of the family Helotidae. The type species is "Metahelotella" monochromata Liu et al. (2019).	
Oisephloeus	Gen. et sp. nov	Valid	Engel & Nel	Eocene (Ypresian)	Oise amber	France	A member of the family Laemophloeidae. Genus includes new species O. resinatus.	
Olmia	Gen. et sp. nov	Valid	Legalov & Perkovsky in Legalov, Vasilenko & Perkovsky	Eocene	Rovno amber	Ukraine	A member of the family Mycetophagidae. The type species is O. drevlyanica.	
Paha groehni	Sp. nov	Valid	Bukejs & Alekseev	Eocene	Rovno amber	Ukraine	A species of Paha.	
Phloiotrya groehni	Sp. nov	Valid	Alekseev & Bukejs	Eocene	Rovno amber	Ukraine	A species of Phloiotrya.	
Plesiogethes	Gen. et sp. nov		Zaitsev, Vasilenko & Perkovsky	Eocene	Rovno amber	Ukraine	A sap beetle. Genus includes new species P. mali.	
Pseudobothrideres u-portator	Sp. nov		Bukejs, McKellar & Alekseev	Eocene	Baltic amber	Europe (Baltic Sea region)	A member of the family Bothrideridae.	
Rutrizoma	Gen. et 2 sp. nov	Valid	Li & Cai in Li et al.	Cretaceous (Albian-Cenomanian)	Kachin amber	Myanmar	A member of the family Trogossitidae. The type species is R. donoghuei; genus also includes R. pisanii.	
Serropalpus groehni	Sp. nov	Valid	Bukejs & Alekseev	Eocene	Rovno amber	Ukraine	A species of Serropalpus.	
Turgaphilus	Gen. et comb. nov	Valid	Lyubarsky & Perkovsky in Lyubarsky et al.	Early Cretaceous (Barremian–Aptian)	Turga Formation	Russia (Zabaykalsky Krai)	A member of the family Erotylidae belonging to the subfamily Xenoscelinae. The type species is "Cryptophagites" capitatus Ponomarenko (1990).	
Vetunitidula	Gen. et sp. nov	Valid	Zhao et al.	Late Cretaceous (Cenomanian)	Kachin amber	Myanmar	A sap beetle. The type species is V. mandibulata.	

===== Elateriformia =====
Name	Novelty	Status	Authors	Age	Type locality	Country	Notes	Images
Brevipterus brachypterus	Sp. nov	Valid	Fanti & Müller	Late Cretaceous (Cenomanian)	Kachin amber	Myanmar	A soldier beetle.	
Brevipterus brevialatus	Sp. nov	Valid	Fanti & Müller	Late Cretaceous (Cenomanian)	Kachin amber	Myanmar	A soldier beetle.	
Brevipterus dimidiatus	Sp. nov	Valid	Fanti & Müller	Late Cretaceous (Cenomanian)	Kachin amber	Myanmar	A soldier beetle.	
Cacomorphocerus deformis	Sp. nov	Valid	Fanti & Müller	Eocene	Baltic amber	Russia (Kaliningrad Oblast)	A soldier beetle.	
Cantharis alekseji	Sp. nov	Valid	Pankowski & Fanti	Eocene	Baltic amber	Europe (Baltic Sea region)	A soldier beetle, a species of Cantharis.	
Cantharis carsteni	Sp. nov	Valid	Fanti	Eocene	Baltic amber	Russia (Kaliningrad Oblast)	A soldier beetle, a species of Cantharis.	
Cantharis damzeni	Sp. nov	Valid	Pankowski & Fanti	Eocene	Baltic amber	Europe (Baltic Sea region)	A soldier beetle, a species of Cantharis.	
Cantharis groehni	Sp. nov	Valid	Fanti	Eocene	Rovno amber	Ukraine	A soldier beetle, a species of Cantharis.	
Cantharis sesermanae	Sp. nov	Valid	Manci, Fanti & Ionesi	Miocene	Bârnova-Muntele Formation	Romania	A soldier beetle, a species of Cantharis.	
Cretadystaxia	Gen. et sp. nov	Valid	Legalov	Late Cretaceous (Cenomanian)	Kachin amber	Myanmar	A member of the family Schizopodidae. The type species is C. burmanica.	
Cretoathous	Gen. et sp. nov	Valid	Zhao, Ślipiński & Wang in Zhao et al.	Cretaceous		Myanmar	A click beetle belonging to the subfamily Dendrometrinae. The type species is C. serratus.	
Cryptocoelus minimus	Sp. nov	Valid	Lee, Cai & Nam	Early Cretaceous (Albian)	Jinju Formation	South Korea	A click beetle.	
Domipteron	Gen. et sp. nov	Valid	Li et al.	Miocene	Dominican amber	Dominican Republic	A member of the family Lycidae. The type species is D. gaoi.	
Dostaliella	Gen. et sp. nov	Valid	Motyka, Kusy & Bocak	Late Cretaceous (Cenomanian)	Kachin amber	Myanmar	A member of the family Lycidae belonging to the subfamily Erotinae. The type species is D. filiformis.	
Electromethes kazantsevi	Comb. nov	Valid	(Alekseev)	Eocene	Baltic amber	Russia (Kaliningrad Oblast)	A member of the family Omethidae; moved from Photinus kazantsevi Alekseev (2019).	
Electronycha arturmichalskii	Sp. nov	Valid	Fanti	Eocene	Baltic amber	Europe (Baltic Sea region, probably Russia, Kaliningrad Oblast)	A soldier beetle belonging to the subfamily Cantharinae and the tribe Cacomorphocerini.	
Euryptychus grandinotalis	Comb. nov	Valid	(Li et al.)	Cretaceous	Kachin amber	Myanmar	A member of the family Eucnemidae; moved from Muonabuntor grandinotalis Li et al. (2020).	
Euryptychus pusillus	Comb. nov	Valid	(Muona)	Cretaceous	Kachin amber	Myanmar	A member of the family Eucnemidae; moved from Jenibuntor pusillus Muona (2020).	
Groehnionycha	Gen. et sp. nov	Valid	Fanti	Eocene	Baltic amber	Russia (Kaliningrad Oblast)	A soldier beetle belonging to the subfamily Cantharinae and the tribe Cantharini. The type species is G. yantarnyca.	
Hiekeolycus winkleri	Sp. nov	Valid	Kazantsev & Yamamoto in Bocak et al.	Eocene (Priabonian)	Baltic amber	Russia (Kaliningrad Oblast)	A member of the family Lycidae belonging to the subfamily Erotinae and the tribe Dictyopterini. Published online in 2023, validated in 2025.	
Hukawngichthyurus monstruosus	Sp. nov	Valid	Fanti & Müller	Late Cretaceous (Cenomanian)	Kachin amber	Myanmar	A soldier beetle.	
Macroeubria groehni	Sp. nov	Valid	Alekseev & Bukejs	Eocene	Baltic amber	Europe (Baltic Sea region)	A water-penny beetle.	
Malthodes camerinii	Sp. nov	Valid	Fanti	Eocene	Baltic amber	Russia (Kaliningrad Oblast)	A soldier beetle, a species of Malthodes.	
Malthodes smu	Sp. nov	Valid	Pankowski & Fanti	Eocene	Rovno amber	Ukraine	A soldier beetle, a species of Malthodes.	
Malthodes susanbuttsae	Sp. nov	Valid	Pankowski & Fanti in Pankowski	Eocene	Baltic amber	Russia (Kaliningrad Oblast)	A soldier beetle, a species of Malthodes.	
Mimoplatycis alekseevi	Sp. nov	Valid	Kazantsev	Eocene	Baltic amber	Europe (Baltic Sea region)	A soldier beetle belonging to the subfamily Malthininae.	
Mimoplatycis carstengroehni	Sp. nov	Valid	Fanti	Eocene	Rovno amber	Ukraine	A soldier beetle belonging to the subfamily Malthininae.	
Mimoplatycis perkovskyi	Sp. nov	Valid	Kazantsev	Eocene	Rovno amber	Ukraine	A soldier beetle belonging to the subfamily Malthininae.	
Mimoplatycis usa	Sp. nov	Valid	Fanti	Eocene	Rovno amber	Ukraine	A soldier beetle belonging to the subfamily Malthininae.	
Paleocardiophorus	Gen. et sp. nov	Valid	Zhao, Ślipiński & Ren	Early Cretaceous	Yixian Formation	China	A click beetle. Genus includes new species P. orientalis.	
Phaenops gutowskii	Sp. nov	Valid	Kwast & Alekseev	Eocene	Baltic amber	Europe (Baltic Sea region)	A species of Phaenops.	
Podistra carstengroehni	Sp. nov	Valid	Fanti	Eocene	Baltic amber	Russia (Kaliningrad Oblast)	A soldier beetle, a species of Podistra.	
Podistra karenpankowskiae	Sp. nov	Valid	Pankowski & Fanti	Eocene	Baltic amber	Europe (Baltic Sea region)	A soldier beetle, a species of Podistra.	
Sanaungulus ambosae	Sp. nov	Valid	Fanti & Müller	Late Cretaceous (Cenomanian)	Kachin amber	Myanmar	A soldier beetle.	
Sanaungulus beeralissae	Sp. nov	Valid	Fanti & Müller	Late Cretaceous (Cenomanian)	Kachin amber	Myanmar	A soldier beetle.	
Sanaungulus beerleniae	Sp. nov	Valid	Fanti & Müller	Late Cretaceous (Cenomanian)	Kachin amber	Myanmar	A soldier beetle.	
Sanaungulus beernalae	Sp. nov	Valid	Fanti & Müller	Late Cretaceous (Cenomanian)	Kachin amber	Myanmar	A soldier beetle.	
Sanaungulus beernilsi	Sp. nov	Valid	Fanti & Müller	Late Cretaceous (Cenomanian)	Kachin amber	Myanmar	A soldier beetle.	
Sanaungulus beerthiloi	Sp. nov	Valid	Fanti & Müller	Late Cretaceous (Cenomanian)	Kachin amber	Myanmar	A soldier beetle.	
Sanaungulus birmanicus	Sp. nov	Valid	Fanti & Müller	Late Cretaceous (Cenomanian)	Kachin amber	Myanmar	A soldier beetle.	
Sanaungulus burgardi	Sp. nov	Valid	Fanti & Müller	Late Cretaceous (Cenomanian)	Kachin amber	Myanmar	A soldier beetle.	
Sanaungulus carloi	Sp. nov	Valid	Fanti & Müller	Late Cretaceous (Cenomanian)	Kachin amber	Myanmar	A soldier beetle.	
Sanaungulus elfriedeae	Sp. nov	Valid	Fanti & Müller	Late Cretaceous (Cenomanian)	Kachin amber	Myanmar	A soldier beetle.	
Sanaungulus feliciaeweissbachae	Sp. nov	Valid	Fanti & Müller	Late Cretaceous (Cenomanian)	Kachin amber	Myanmar	A soldier beetle.	
Sanaungulus fossilis	Sp. nov	Valid	Fanti & Müller	Late Cretaceous (Cenomanian)	Kachin amber	Myanmar	A soldier beetle.	
Sanaungulus massaronei	Sp. nov	Valid	Fanti & Müller	Late Cretaceous (Cenomanian)	Kachin amber	Myanmar	A soldier beetle.	
Sanaungulus rosaemariae	Sp. nov	Valid	Fanti & Müller	Late Cretaceous (Cenomanian)	Kachin amber	Myanmar	A soldier beetle.	
Sanaungulus sucinus	Sp. nov	Valid	Fanti & Müller	Late Cretaceous (Cenomanian)	Kachin amber	Myanmar	A soldier beetle.	
Scutacalyptus	Gen. et sp. nov	Valid	Li et al.	Cretaceous (Albian-Cenomanian)	Kachin amber	Myanmar	A member of the family Clambidae. The type species is S. kolibaci.	
Serracyphon	Gen. et sp. nov	Valid	Li et al.	Cretaceous (Albian to Cenomanian)	Kachin amber	Myanmar	A member of the family Scirtidae. The type species is S. philipsi.	
Serrathroscinus	Gen. et sp. nov	Valid	Li, Huang & Cai	Cretaceous (Albian-Cenomanian)	Kachin amber	Myanmar	A member of the family Limnichidae belonging to the subfamily Cephalobyrrhinae. The type species is S. majaechi.	
Silis aztecimaya	Sp. nov	Valid	Fanti & Müller	Miocene	Mexican amber	Mexico	A soldier beetle, a species of Silis.	
Sucinorhagonycha pugachensis	Sp. nov	Valid	Kazantsev & Perkovsky in Kazantsev, Legalov & Perkovsky	Eocene	Rovno amber	Ukraine	A soldier beetle.	
Xanrofeurya	Gen. et sp. nov	Valid	Li, Huang & Cai	Cretaceous (Albian-Cenomanian)	Kachin amber	Myanmar	A member of the family Eucnemidae belonging to the subfamily Macraulacinae. The type species is X. tomaszewskae.	
Yallmoleia	Gen. et sp. nov	Valid	Li, Huang & Cai	Cretaceous (Albian-Cenomanian)	Kachin amber	Myanmar	A member of the family Eucnemidae belonging to the subfamily Eucneminae. The type species is Y. arriagavarelai.	

===== Scarabaeiformia =====
Name	Novelty	Status	Authors	Age	Type locality	Country	Notes	Images
Crassiungula	Gen. et sp. nov	Valid	Li, Huang & Cai	Cretaceous	Kachin amber	Myanmar	A member of Scarabaeoidea. Genus includes new species C. lawrencei.	
Cretofigulus	Gen. et 2 sp. nov	Valid	Qi et al.	Cretaceous	Kachin amber	Myanmar	A stag beetle. The type species is C. caoqiangi; genus also includes C. hollowayae.	

===== Staphyliniformia =====
Name	Novelty	Status	Authors	Age	Type locality	Country	Notes	Images
Alloraphes cantusfurca	Sp. nov	Valid	Egan, Loewen & McKellar	Miocene	Yanigua Formation (Dominican amber)	Dominican Republic	A member of the tribe Stenichnini.	
Anapleus miocenicus	Sp. nov	Valid	Simon-Pražák et al.	Miocene	Mexican amber	Mexico	A species of Anapleus.	
Burmaphagus	Gen. et sp. nov	Valid	Yamamoto & Perreau	Cretaceous (Albian to Cenomanian)	Kachin amber	Myanmar	A member of the family Leiodidae belonging to the subfamily Cholevinae and the tribe Ptomaphagini. The type species is B. yamamotoae.	
Colonellus hkamtiensis	Sp. nov	Valid	Yamamoto	Early Cretaceous (Albian)	Hkamti amber	Myanmar	A member of Staphylinoidea belonging to the family Colonidae.	
Cretochirus elongatus	Sp. nov	Valid	Yamamoto	Early Cretaceous (Albian)	Hkamti amber	Myanmar	A rove beetle belonging to the subfamily Osoriinae and the tribe Leptochirini.	
Cretosaja thayerae	Sp. nov	Valid	Cai	Early Cretaceous	Yixian Formation	China	A rove beetle belonging to the subfamily Silphinae.	
Diochus balticus	Sp. nov	Valid	Janák	Eocene	Baltic amber	Russia (Kaliningrad Oblast)	A species of Diochus.	
Eusphalerum rovnoense	Sp. nov	Valid	Shavrin & Perkovsky in Shavrin, Vasilenko & Perkovsky	Eocene	Rovno amber	Ukraine	A species of Eusphalerum.	
Fantosmium	Gen. et sp. nov	Valid	Li, Huang & Cai	Cretaceous (Albian to Cenomanian)	Kachin amber	Myanmar	A member of the family Histeridae belonging to the subfamily Onthophilinae. The type species is F. qizhihaoi.	
Nartanacus	Gen. et 2 sp. nov	Valid	Chen et al.	Cretaceous		Myanmar	A rove beetle. The type species is N. hosimonis; genus also includes N. argutus.	
Ochthephilus wui	Sp. nov	Valid	Chen et al.	Cretaceous		Myanmar	A species of Ochthephilus.	
Paracretosaja	Gen. et sp. nov	Valid	Cai	Early Cretaceous	Yixian Formation	China	A rove beetle belonging to the subfamily Silphinae. The type species is P. newtoni.	
Prosolierius antennatus	Sp. nov	Valid	Yamamoto	Early Cretaceous (Albian)	Hkamti amber	Myanmar	A rove beetle belonging to the subfamily Solieriinae.	
Prosolierius qizhihaoi	Sp. nov		Liu et al.	Cretaceous	Kachin amber	Myanmar	A rove beetle.	
Samavayanus	Gen. et 2 sp. nov	Valid	Chen et al.	Cretaceous		Myanmar	A rove beetle. The type species is S. azari; genus also includes S. hongzhangi.	
Yethiha lackneri	Sp. nov	Valid	Simon-Pražák, Háva & Prokop	Cretaceous	Kachin amber	Myanmar	A member of the family Histeridae.	
Zavoticus	Gen. et sp. nov	Valid	Li et al.	Cretaceous (Albian to Cenomanian)	Kachin amber	Myanmar	A rove beetle belonging to the subfamily Euaesthetinae. The type species is Z. yini.	

===== Other Polyphaga =====
Name	Novelty	Status	Authors	Age	Type locality	Country	Notes	Images
Benemerita	Gen. et sp. nov	Disputed	Molino-Olmedo	Late Cretaceous (Cenomanian)	Kachin amber	Myanmar	Originally described as a member of the family Ptinidae belonging to the subfamily Dryophilinae; subsequently argued by Legalov & Legalov (2025) to be a member of the family Cerophytidae and a junior synonym of Amberophytum. The type species is B. burmitica. Published online in 2025, but the issue date is listed as December 2024.	
Nosodendron (Dendrodipnis) andrushchenkoi	Sp. nov	Valid	Alekseev & Bukejs	Eocene	Baltic amber	Russia (Kaliningrad Oblast)	A species of Nosodendron.	

==== †Protocoleoptera ====
Name	Novelty	Status	Authors	Age	Type locality	Country	Notes	Images
Archicupes storozhenkoi	Sp. nov	Valid	Yan, Felker & Strelnikova	Early Triassic	Nidym Formation	Russia (Krasnoyarsk Krai)	A member of the family Permocupedidae.	
Cytocupes magnus	Sp. nov	Valid	Yan, Felker & Strelnikova	Early Triassic	Nidym Formation	Russia (Krasnoyarsk Krai)	A member of the family Permocupedidae.	
Tatarocupes brevicellularis	Sp. nov	Valid	Yan, Felker & Strelnikova	Early Triassic	Nidym Formation	Russia (Krasnoyarsk Krai)	A member of the family Permocupedidae.	

==== Coleopteran research ====
- Bao et al. (2025) redescribe Tigrivia baii.
- Haug et al. (2025) describe new rove beetle larvae from the Cretaceous Kachin amber, compare their morphology to those of lacewing larvae from the same amber and those of extant rove beetle larvae, and interpret their findigs as suggesting that rove beetle larvae diversified after the Cretaceous and substituted the morphologies of Cretaceous lacewing larvae.
- New information on the morphology of Clidicostigus arachnipes is provided by Cao, Liu & Liu (2025).
- Sánchez et al. (2025) argue that purported brood balls of dung beetles from the Eocene La Meseta Formation (Antarctica) are not true trace fossils, and consider Patagonian trace fossils of Coprinisphaera to represent the southernmost known record of this ichnotaxon.
- Cantil et al. (2025) study the fossil record of Coprinisphaera in the Cenozoic of South America, and interpret it as indicating that necrophagy in Scarabaeinae likely originated in Patagonia in the middle–late Eocene.
- Haug & Haug (2025) describe a soldier beetle larva from the Cretaceous Kachin amber (Myanmar), preserved with paired openings on its trunk interpreted as indicative of presence of defensive glands.
- Click beetle larvae belonging to the subfamily Pityobiinae and likely to the tribe Tibionemini are identified in the Cretaceous (Cenomanian) Kachin amber from Myanmar by Kundrata et al. (2025).
- Linhart et al. (2025) describe new click beetle larvae from the Kachin amber, interpreted as likely wood-associated predators, and preserving evidence of morphological differences with other insect larvae from the same habitat which might be related to ecological differences.
- A study on dermestid larvae from Cretaceous, Eocene and Miocene ambers, providing evidence of presence of longer defensive setae in extinct dermestids compared to extant ones, is published by Le Cadre et al. (2025).
- Batelka, Kundrata & Straka (2025) study the phylogenetic relationships of fossil members of Tenebrionoidea, name new families Wuhuidae, Bellimordellidae and Mirimordellidae, raise the subfamily Praemordellinae to the rank of the family, and assign Yakutia sukachevae to the new subfamily Yakutiinae within the family Mordellidae.
- Ghaedi et al. (2025) describe new insect trace fossils (sinuous channels in wood, probably produced by beetles feeding on wood) from the Campanian strata of the Tarbur Formation (Iran), and name a new ichnotaxon Iranichnus farsensis.
- Schafstall et al. (2025) report the discovery of subfossil beetle remains from Lithuania, providing evidence of presence of cold-adapted species but no evidence of presence of true arctic species during the Weichselian glaciation.

== Dermapterans ==
Name	Novelty	Status	Authors	Age	Type locality	Country	Notes	Images
Adiathetodes	Gen. et sp. nov	Valid	Engel et al.	Oligocene		Germany	A possible member of the family Chelisochidae. Genus includes new species A. nassauensis.	
Kraterlabis	Gen. et sp. nov	Valid	Engel et al.	Oligocene		Germany	A possible member of the family Anisolabididae. Genus includes new species K. primordialis.	

=== Dermapteran research ===
- Santos et al. (2025) redescribe Cratoborellia gorbi and report the discovery of an additional specimen of Caririlabia berghoffi from the Lower Cretaceous of the Araripe Basin (Brazil).

== Clade Dictyoptera ==
Name	Novelty	Status	Authors	Age	Type locality	Country	Notes	Images
Alienopterus imposter	Sp. nov	Valid	Vršanský et al.	Early Cretaceous (Albian)	Jinju Formation	South Korea	A member of the family Alienopteridae.	
Alienospina	Gen. et sp. nov		Sendi et al.	Cretaceous	Kachin amber	Myanmar	A member of the family Alienopteridae. Genus includes new species A. samayi.	
Ano ale	Sp. nov	Valid	Vršanský et al.	Early Cretaceous (Albian)	Jinju Formation	South Korea	A member of the family Liberiblattinidae.	
Arceotermes bellator	Sp. nov	Valid	Jouault, Smith & Engel	Cretaceous	Kachin amber	Myanmar	A termite belonging to the family Arceotermitidae.	
Archimesoblatta basopicta	Sp. nov	Valid	Vršanský et al.	Early Cretaceous (Albian)	Jinju Formation	South Korea	A member of the family Mesoblattinidae.	
Asioblatta jeongchonensis	Sp. nov	Valid	Vršanský et al.	Early Cretaceous (Albian)	Jinju Formation	South Korea	A member of the family Raphidiomimidae.	
Blattapterix reticulata	Sp. nov	Valid	Vršanský et al.	Early Cretaceous (Albian)	Jinju Formation	South Korea	A member of the family Umenocoleidae.	
Blattula pessimusestfinis	Sp. nov	Valid	Vršanský et al.	Early Cretaceous (Albian)	Jinju Formation	South Korea	A member of the family Blattulidae.	
Brutalista	Gen. et sp. nov	Valid	Vršanský et al.	Early Cretaceous (Albian)	Jinju Formation	South Korea	A member of the family Liberiblattinidae. The type species is B. masivny.	
Bubosa petrarosa	Sp. nov	Valid	Vršanský et al.	Early Cretaceous (Albian)	Jinju Formation	South Korea	A member of the family Blattidae.	
Burmavenator	Gen. et sp. nov		Shcherbakov & Minaev	Cretaceous		Myanmar	A mantis. The type species is B. ornatus.	
Caputoraptor ganggu	Sp. nov	Valid	Vršanský et al.	Early Cretaceous (Albian)	Jinju Formation	South Korea	A member of the family Alienopteridae.	
Cameloblatta immaculata	Sp. nov	Valid	Vršanský et al.	Early Cretaceous (Albian)	Jinju Formation	South Korea	A member of the family Raphidiomimidae.	
Chunxiangus	Gen. et sp. nov	Valid	Luo, Xiao & Luo	Late Cretaceous (Cenomanian)	Kachin amber	Myanmar	A member of the family Umenocoleidae. The type species is C. shii.	
Compostus	Gen. et sp. nov	Valid	Vršanský	Late Cretaceous (Cenomanian)	Kachin amber	Myanmar	A member of the family Liberiblattinidae. The type species is C. supremus.	
Cretophotina smidovae	Sp. nov	Valid	Vršanský et al.	Early Cretaceous (Albian)	Jinju Formation	South Korea	A member of Mantodea.	
Elisama baeki	Sp. nov	Valid	Vršanský et al.	Early Cretaceous (Albian)	Jinju Formation	South Korea	A member of the family Blattulidae.	
Elisama kacerovae	Sp. nov	Valid	Sendi	Late Cretaceous (Cenomanian)	Kachin amber	Myanmar	A member of the family Blattulidae.	
Elisama simplex	Sp. nov	Valid	Vršanský et al.	Early Cretaceous (Albian)	Jinju Formation	South Korea	A member of the family Blattulidae.	
Etomylacris straeleni	Sp. nov	Valid	Santos et al.	Carboniferous (Moscovian)	Benxi Formation	China	A roachoid stem-dictyopteran belonging to the family Mylacridae.	
Holocompsa scleroptera	Sp. nov	Valid	Vršanský et al.	Early Cretaceous (Albian)	Jinju Formation	South Korea	A member of the family Corydiidae.	
Ioouoonool	Gen. et sp. nov	Valid	Vršanský et al.	Early Cretaceous (Albian)	Jinju Formation	South Korea	A member of the family Corydiidae. The type species is I. taktobybolo.	
Jinjublatta	Gen. et sp. nov	Valid	Vršanský et al.	Early Cretaceous (Albian)	Jinju Formation	South Korea	A member of the family Mesoblattinidae. The type species is J. cascadaerrorum.	
Juramantis jinjuensis	Sp. nov	Valid	Vršanský et al.	Early Cretaceous (Albian)	Jinju Formation	South Korea	A member of Mantodea.	
Juramantis geongonrigam	Sp. nov	Valid	Vršanský et al.	Early Cretaceous (Albian)	Jinju Formation	South Korea	A member of Mantodea.	
Kedysi	Gen. et sp. nov	Valid	Vršanský & Koubová	Cretaceous	Kachin amber	Myanmar	A member of the family Mesoblattinidae. The type species is K. akokolvek.	
Megatermes	Gen. et sp. nov	Valid	Žalohar, Gašparič & Hitij	Miocene		Slovenia	A termite belonging to the family Heterotermitidae. The type species is M. robustus.	
Memento futuri	Sp. nov	Valid	Vršanský et al.	Early Cretaceous (Albian)	Jinju Formation	South Korea	A member of the family Caloblattinidae.	
Mongolblatta koreanensis	Sp. nov	Valid	Vršanský et al.	Early Cretaceous (Albian)	Jinju Formation	South Korea	A member of the family Mesoblattinidae.	
Necymylacris sinica	Sp. nov		Santos, Mcloughlin & Nel	Permian (Asselian)	Shanxi Formation	China	A roachoid stem-dictyopteran belonging to the family Necymylacridae.	
Neoblattella cookrock	Sp. nov	Valid	Vršanský et al.	Early Cretaceous (Albian)	Jinju Formation	South Korea	A member of the family Ectobiidae.	
Ocelloblattula gyongsangensis	Sp. nov	Valid	Vršanský et al.	Early Cretaceous (Albian)	Jinju Formation	South Korea	A member of the family Blattulidae.	
Perlucipecta cyclopica	Sp. nov	Valid	Vršanský et al.	Early Cretaceous (Albian)	Jinju Formation	South Korea	A member of the family Mesoblattinidae.	
Perlucipecta jinjuicola	Sp. nov	Valid	Vršanský et al.	Early Cretaceous (Albian)	Jinju Formation	South Korea	A member of the family Mesoblattinidae.	
Perlucipecta major	Sp. nov	Valid	Vršanský et al.	Early Cretaceous (Albian)	Jinju Formation	South Korea	A member of the family Mesoblattinidae.	
Petropterix nikdyviac	Sp. nov	Valid	Vršanský et al.	Early Cretaceous (Albian)	Jinju Formation	South Korea	A member of the family Umenocoleidae.	
Petropterix oculata	Sp. nov	Valid	Vršanský et al.	Early Cretaceous (Albian)	Jinju Formation	South Korea	A member of the family Umenocoleidae.	
Praeblattella decolor	Sp. nov	Valid	Vršanský et al.	Early Cretaceous (Albian)	Jinju Formation	South Korea	A member of the family Mesoblattinidae.	
Praeblattella tinctoria	Sp. nov	Valid	Vršanský et al.	Early Cretaceous (Albian)	Jinju Formation	South Korea	A member of the family Mesoblattinidae.	
Pseudaphtoromylacris	Fam. et gen. et sp. nov	Valid	Santos et al.	Carboniferous (Moscovian)	Benxi Formation	China	A roachoid stem-dictyopteran, the type genus of the new family Pseudaphtoromylacridae. The type species is P. paucinervis.	
Pycnoblattina valeriea	Sp. nov		Garrouste, Boderau & Nel	Permian (Wordian)		France	A roachoid belonging to the family Spiloblattinidae.	
Recyklovany	Gen. et sp. nov	Valid	Vršanský et al.	Early Cretaceous (Albian)	Jinju Formation	South Korea	A member of the family Alienopteridae. The type species is R. kolotoc.	
Samaroblattella valmarensis	Sp. nov	Valid	Montagna et al.	Middle Triassic (Ladinian)	Meride Limestone	Switzerland	A roachoid belonging to the family Subioblattidae.	
Sergyessa	Gen. et sp. nov	Valid	Shcherbakov et al.	Eocene (Ypresian)	Fur Formation	Denmark	A praying mantis. The type species is S. rusti.	
Sooblattella ater	Sp. nov	Valid	Santos et al.	Carboniferous (Moscovian)	Benxi Formation	China	A roachoid stem-dictyopteran belonging to the family Mylacridae.	
Spilarchimylacris kaipingense	Sp. nov	Valid	Santos et al.	Carboniferous (Moscovian)	Benxi Formation	China	A roachoid stem-dictyopteran belonging to the family Archimylacridae.	
Spinaeblattina varilabilitta	Sp. nov	Valid	Vršanský et al.	Early Cretaceous (Albian)	Jinju Formation	South Korea	A member of the family Mesoblattinidae.	
Stictolampra baqueuii	Sp. nov	Valid	Vršanský et al.	Early Cretaceous (Albian)	Jinju Formation	South Korea	A member of the family Blaberidae.	
Tangshanblatta	Gen. et sp. nov	Valid	Santos et al.	Carboniferous (Moscovian)	Benxi Formation	China	A roachoid stem-dictyopteran belonging to the family Phyloblattidae. The type species is T. inexpectata.	
Tayphoonoblatta	Gen. et sp. nov	Valid	Vršanský et al.	Early Cretaceous (Albian)	Jinju Formation	South Korea	A member of the family Raphidiomimidae. The type species is T. correntini.	
Vrtula jinjuensis	Sp. nov	Valid	Vršanský et al.	Early Cretaceous (Albian)	Jinju Formation	South Korea	A member of the family Blattulidae.	

=== Dictyopteran research ===
- Revision of the roachoid family Poroblattinidae, based on data from new fossils from the Carboniferous strata in Morocco, is published by Belahmira, Schneider & Saber (2025).
- Evidence from the study of a specimen of Ambermantis wozniaki from the Turonian Raritan Formation (New Jersey, United States, interpreted as indicating that the studied mantis had large eyes with a high-resolution vision and a broad binocular visual field, is presented by Taniguchi et al. (2025).
- Edwards et al. (2025) describe a conifer log with tunnels and coprolites produced by termites from the Lower Cretaceous (Hauterivian-Aptian) upper Strzelecki Group, representing the earliest fossil evidence of presence of termites in Australia reported to date and their first record from a circumpolar setting.
- Paik et al. (2025) reported termite borings on the surface of a conifer stem, showing similarities to traces of Kalotermitidae, from the Lower Cretaceous Donghwachi Formation, representing the first occurrence of termite traces in Korea.

== Hymenopterans ==
=== Symphyta ===
Name	Novelty	Status	Authors	Age	Type locality	Country	Notes	Images
Cretovelona	Gen. et sp. nov	Valid	Vilhelmsen, Nakamine & Yamamoto in Vilhelmsen et al.	Cretaceous (Albian to Cenomanian)	Kachin amber	Myanmar	A member of Orussoidea. The type species is C. orussopteryx.	
Deresyntexis	Gen. et sp. nov	Valid	Oyama, Jouault & Mita	Cretaceous	Kachin amber	Myanmar	A member of the family Anaxyelidae. The type species is D. bethouxi.	
Enneoxyela aculeata	Sp. nov	Valid	Li, Rasnitsyn & Zhuang	Early Cretaceous	Yixian Formation	China	A member of the family Xyelidae.	
Enneoxyela eucalla	Sp. nov	Valid	Li, Rasnitsyn & Zhuang	Early Cretaceous	Yixian Formation	China	A member of the family Xyelidae.	
Ghilarella jinjuensis	Sp. nov	Valid	Jouault et al.	Early Cretaceous (Albian)	Jinju Formation	South Korea	A member of the family Sepulcidae belonging to the subfamily Ghilarellinae.	
Hemixyela	Gen. et sp. nov	Valid	Li, Rasnitsyn & Zhuang	Early Cretaceous	Yixian Formation	China	A member of the family Xyelidae. The type species is H. elongata.	
Junfengixyela	Gen. et comb. nov	Valid	Li, Rasnitsyn & Zhuang	Miocene	Shanwang Formation	China	A member of the family Xyelidae. The type species is "Xyela" cenozoica Zhang (1989).	
Karasyntexis	Gen. et sp. nov	Valid	Kopylov & Rasnitsyn	Jurassic	Karabastau Formation	Kazakhstan	A member of the family Anaxyelidae belonging to the subfamily Syntexinae. The type species is K. martynovi.	
Madygella fujiyama	Sp. nov	Valid	Oyama et al.	Late Triassic (Carnian)	Momonoki Formation	Japan	A member of the family Xyelidae.	
Meiaghilarella stanislawlemi	Sp. nov	Valid	Jouault et al.	Early Cretaceous (Albian)	Jinju Formation	South Korea	A member of the family Sepulcidae belonging to the subfamily Ghilarellinae.	
Ominexyela	Gen. et sp. nov	Valid	Oyama et al.	Late Triassic (Carnian)	Momonoki Formation	Japan	A member of the family Xyelidae. The type species is O. ishidai.	
Orthosyntexis cretacicus	Sp. nov	Valid	Zheng in Wang et al.	Cretaceous	Kachin amber	Myanmar	A member of the family Anaxyelidae.	
Orthosyntexis mascula	Sp. nov	Valid	Li & Wei in Li, Niu & Wei	Cretaceous	Kachin amber	Myanmar	A member of the family Anaxyelidae.	
Samarkandykia haradai	Sp. nov	Valid	Oyama et al.	Late Triassic (Carnian)	Momonoki Formation	Japan	A member of the family Xyelidae.	
Samarkandykia noharai	Sp. nov	Valid	Oyama et al.	Late Triassic (Carnian)	Momonoki Formation	Japan	A member of the family Xyelidae.	
Spinarge miocenicus	Sp. nov	Valid	Ngô Muller, Riou & Nel	Miocene		France	A member of the family Argidae.	
Tugnuxyela	Gen. et comb. nov	Valid	Li, Rasnitsyn & Zhuang	Early Jurassic	Ichetuy Formation	Russia	A member of the family Xyelidae. The type species is "Eoxyela" tugnuica Rasnitsyn (1983).	

==== Symphytan research ====
- New information on the anatomy of Moltenia rieki is provided by Oyama et al. (2025).

=== Apocrita ===
==== Apoidea ====
Name	Novelty	Status	Authors	Age	Type locality	Country	Notes	Images
Apis aibai	Sp. nov	Valid	Takahashi & Takahashi	Pliocene–Pleistocene	Teragi Group	Japan	A honey bee.	
Bombus (Kronobombus) messegus	Sp. nov	Valid	Engel & Wappler in Geier et al.	Oligocene (Chattian)	Enspel Formation	Germany	A bumblebee.	
Bombus (Timebombus) palaeocrater	Sp. nov	Valid	Engel & Wappler in Geier et al.	Oligocene (Chattian)	Enspel Formation	Germany	A bumblebee.	
Leioproctus (Otagocolletes) barrydonovani	Sp. nov	Valid	Engel & Kaulfuss	Miocene (Langhian)	Hindon Maar Lagerstätte	New Zealand	A species of Leioproctus.	
Panurgus (Chronopanurgus) tribacus	Sp. nov	Valid	Engel	Miocene	Öhningen site	Germany	A species of Panurgus.	
Promeliphron	Gen. et comb. nov	Valid	Engel	Eocene	Baltic amber	Russia (Kaliningrad Oblast)	A melikertine bee. The type species is "Succinapis" micheneri Engel (2001).	

===== Apoid research =====
- Aiba & Ono (2025) describe a bumblebee queen from the Pleistocene Miyajima Formation (Japan) belonging to the species Bombus cf. diversus and representing the first known fossil of an extant bumblebee species.
- Viñola-López et al. (2025) describe brood cells within cavities of mammal remains from Quaternary deposits in Cueva de Mono (Dominican Republic), likely produced by bees belonging to the family Halictidae, and name a new ichnotaxon Osnidum almontei.

==== Ceraphronoidea ====
Name	Novelty	Status	Authors	Age	Type locality	Country	Notes	Images
Ceospilus	Fam. et gen. et sp. nov		Engel	Early Cretaceous (Barremian)	Lebanese amber	Lebanon	The type genus of the new family Ceospilidae (possibly synonymous with Radiophronidae). The type species is C. phoenicius.	
Conostigmus novacaesarea	Sp. nov		Engel	Late Cretaceous (Turonian)	New Jersey amber	United States (New Jersey)	A species of Conostigmus.	
Crucimaimetsha	Gen. et sp. nov	Valid	Li, Kopylov & Rasnitsyn in Li et al.	Cretaceous (Albian to Cenomanian)	Kachin amber	Myanmar	A member of the family Maimetshidae. The type species is C. nigra.	
Dendrocerus ypresicus	Sp. nov		Engel	Eocene (Ypresian)		India	A species of Dendrocerus.	
Guyotemaimetsha ortegablancoi	Sp. nov	Valid	Li, Kopylov & Rasnitsyn in Li et al.	Cretaceous (Albian to Cenomanian)	Kachin amber	Myanmar	A member of the family Maimetshidae.	
Guyotemaimetsha perrichoti	Sp. nov	Valid	Li, Kopylov & Rasnitsyn in Li et al.	Cretaceous (Albian to Cenomanian)	Kachin amber	Myanmar	A member of the family Maimetshidae.	
Maimetshasia engeli	Sp. nov	Valid	Li, Kopylov & Rasnitsyn in Li et al.	Cretaceous (Albian to Cenomanian)	Kachin amber	Myanmar	A member of the family Maimetshidae.	
Maimetshasia nova	Sp. nov	Valid	Li, Kopylov & Rasnitsyn in Li et al.	Cretaceous (Albian to Cenomanian)	Kachin amber	Myanmar	A member of the family Maimetshidae.	

==== Chalcidoidea ====
Name	Novelty	Status	Authors	Age	Type locality	Country	Notes	Images
Electrocerus fallaszeki	Sp. nov	Valid	Simutnik in Simutnik, Pankowski & Perkovsky	Eocene	Baltic amber	Poland	A member of the family Encyrtidae.	
Waninka	Gen. et sp. nov	Valid	Simutnik in Simutnik, Pankowski & Perkovsky	Probably Eocene		Germany	A member of the family Encyrtidae. The type species is W. haikowielandi.	

==== Chrysidoidea ====
Name	Novelty	Status	Authors	Age	Type locality	Country	Notes	Images
Aplatopsenella	Gen. et sp. nov	Valid	Jouault & Huang	Cretaceous	Kachin amber	Myanmar	A member of the family Bethylidae belonging to the subfamily Cretabythinae. Genus includes new species A. engeli.	
Cenomanisega	Gen. et sp. nov		Lucena & Melo	Cretaceous		Myanmar	A cuckoo wasp. The type species is C. krombeini.	
Cleptes trematos	Sp. nov	Valid	Lucena & Melo	Eocene	Baltic amber	Europe (Baltic Sea region)	A species of Cleptes.	
Cretamisega	Gen. et sp. nov		Lucena & Melo	Cretaceous		Myanmar	A cuckoo wasp. The type species is C. mandibularis.	
Holopsenelliscus bilobatus	Sp. nov	Valid	Jouault & Huang	Cretaceous	Kachin amber	Myanmar	A member of the family Bethylidae belonging to the subfamily Cretabythinae.	
Miracorium amica	Sp. nov		Lucena & Melo	Cretaceous		Myanmar	A cuckoo wasp.	
Pachycephalopenesia	Gen. et sp. nov		Álvarez-Parra & Maksoud	Early Cretaceous (Barremian)	Lebanese amber	Lebanon	A member of the family Scolebythidae belonging to the subfamily Pristapenesiinae. The type species is P. eximia.	
Protognathosega	Gen. et sp. nov		Lucena & Melo	Cretaceous		Myanmar	A cuckoo wasp. The type species is P. depilis.	
Sirenobethylus	Fam. et gen. et sp. nov	Valid	Wu, Vilhelmsen & Gao in Wu et al.	Cretaceous	Kachin amber	Myanmar	The type genus of the new family Sirenobethylidae. The type species is S. charybdis.	
Telistosega	Gen. et sp. nov		Lucena & Melo	Cretaceous		Myanmar	A cuckoo wasp. The type species is T. intermedia.	
Trichrysis perrichoti	Sp. nov		Brazidec & Rosa	Miocene (Langhian)	Fotan Group (Zhangpu amber)	China	A species of Trichrysis.	

==== Diaprioidea ====
Name	Novelty	Status	Authors	Age	Type locality	Country	Notes	Images
Eoaclista	Gen. et sp. nov	Valid	Brazidec	Late Cretaceous (Cenomanian)	Kachin amber	Myanmar	A member of the family Diapriidae. The type species is E. exquisita.	
Karaweik	Gen. et sp. nov	Valid	Álvarez-Parra & Jouault in Álvarez-Parra et al.	Cretaceous	Kachin amber	Myanmar	A member of the family Spathiopterygidae. Genus includes new species K. splendida.	
Thyburia	Gen. et sp. nov	Valid	Chemyreva & Rasnitsyn	Late Cretaceous (Cenomanian)	Kachin amber	Myanmar	A member of the family Ismaridae. The type species is T. christophi.	
Trichopria electrosinica	Sp. nov	Valid	Brazidec & Perrichot	Miocene	Fotan Group (Zhangpu amber)	China	A member of the family Diapriidae.	

==== Evanioidea ====
Name	Novelty	Status	Authors	Age	Type locality	Country	Notes	Images
Coronaulacus	Gen. et sp. nov	Valid	Wang et al.	Cretaceous	Kachin amber	Myanmar	A member of the family Praeaulacidae. The type species is C. cancan.	
Cretevania orgonomecorum	Sp. nov	Valid	Peñalver & Sánchez-García in Peñalver et al.	Early Cretaceous (Albian)	Peñosas Formation (El Soplao amber)	Spain	A member of the family Evaniidae.	

==== Formicoidea ====
Name	Novelty	Status	Authors	Age	Type locality	Country	Notes	Images
Aphaenogaster khomychi	Sp. nov	Valid	Radchenko	Eocene	Rovno amber	Ukraine	A species of Aphaenogaster.	
Aphaenogaster wennebergi	Sp. nov	Valid	Zharkov & Dubovikoff in Zharkov et al.	Eocene	Danish amber	Denmark	A species of Aphaenogaster.	
Basiceros enana	Sp. nov		Fiorentino et al.	Miocene	Dominican amber	Dominican Republic	A species of Basiceros.	
Camponotites flarex	Nom. nov	Valid	Fisher	Miocene (Burdigalian)	Shanwang Formation	China	A replacement name for Camponotus pictus Zhang, Sun & Zhang (1994).	
Cardiocondyla primitiva	Sp. nov	Valid	Radchenko & Khomych	Eocene	Rovno amber	Ukraine	A species of Cardiocondyla.	
Carebara andrushchenkoi	Sp. nov	Valid	Zharkov & Dubovikoff in Zharkov, Dubovikoff & Abakumov	Eocene (Priabonian)	Baltic amber	Russia (Kaliningrad Oblast)	A species of Carebara.	
Eridanomyrma	Gen. et sp. nov	Valid	Zharkov & Dubovikoff in Zharkov, Dubovikoff & Abakumov	Eocene	Baltic amber	Russia (Kaliningrad Oblast)	An ant belonging to the subfamily Formicinae. The type species is E. unipetropolitana.	
Estevia	Nom. nov	Valid	Fisher	Eocene	Fushun amber	China	A replacement name for Wilsonia Hong (2002).	
Formica lavateri liora	Nom. nov	Valid	Fisher	Miocene		Croatia	A replacement name for Formica lavateri var. major Heer (1867).	
Gerontoformica priapos	Sp. nov	Valid	Zhuang, Boudinot & Perrichot in Zhuang et al.	Late Cretaceous (Cenomanian)	Kachin amber	Myanmar	An ant belonging to the subfamily Sphecomyrminae.	
Messor draxil	Nom. nov	Valid	Fisher	Eocene	Florissant Formation	United States (Colorado)	A replacement name for Messor sculpturatus Carpenter (1930).	
Myrmica andryushchenkoi	Sp. nov	Valid	Zharkov & Dubovikoff in Zharkov, Dubovikoff & Abakumov	Eocene	Baltic amber	Russia (Kaliningrad Oblast)	A species of Myrmica.	
Odontomachus angulops	Sp. nov	Valid	França & Gomes	Miocene	Mexican amber	Mexico	A species of Odontomachus.	
Vulcanidris	Gen. et sp. nov	Valid	Lepeco, Brandão & Camacho in Lepeco et al.	Early Cretaceous (Aptian)	Crato Formation	Brazil	A member of the subfamily Haidomyrmecinae. The type species is V. cratensis.	
Zigrasimecia bellator	Sp. nov	Valid	Zhuang et al.	Cretaceous (Albian-Cenomanian)	Kachin amber	Myanmar		
Zigrasimecia sinusoidal	Sp. nov	Valid	Zhuang et al.	Cretaceous (Albian-Cenomanian)	Kachin amber	Myanmar		

===== Formicoidea research =====
- Prebus & Rabeling (2025) interpret Manica andrannae as a likely member of the stem group of the genus Manica.
- Radchenko & Ribbecke (2025) report the discovery of a queen of Stiphromyrmex robustus from the Eocene Baltic amber, and place extinct genera Stiphromyrmex, Enneamerus and Thanacomyrmex within the Myrmecina genus-group of the tribe Crematogastrini.

==== Ichneumonoidea ====
Name	Novelty	Status	Authors	Age	Type locality	Country	Notes	Images
Aulosaphes fumipennis	Sp. nov	Valid	Belokobylskij in Belokobylskij & Manukyan	Eocene	Prussian Formation (Baltic amber)	Russia (Kaliningrad Oblast)	A species of Aulosaphes.	
Balticampsis	Gen. et sp. nov	Valid	Belokobylskij in Belokobylskij, Achterberg & Manukyan	Eocene	Baltic amber	Europe (Baltic Sea region)	A member of the family Braconidae belonging to the subfamily Sigalphinae. The type species is B. inopinatus.	
Firkantus storozhenkoi	Sp. nov	Valid	Manukyan in Manukyan, Smirnova & Sinelschikova	Eocene	Baltic amber	Europe (Baltic Sea region)	A member of the family Ichneumonidae.	
Furpherhombus	Gen. et sp. et comb. nov	Valid	Manukyan	Eocene	Prussian Formation (Baltic amber)	Russia (Kaliningrad Oblast)	A member of the family Ichneumonidae belonging to the subfamily Pherhombinae. The type species is F. leleji; genus also includes "Pherhombus" parvulus Meier, Wacker & Klopfstein (2022) from the Fur Formation (Denmark).	
Paleolebus	Gen. et sp. nov	Valid	Žalohar, Gašparič & Hitij	Miocene		Slovenia	A member of the family Braconidae. The type species is P. davois.	
Prochremylus museumoceanus	Sp. nov	Valid	Belokobylskij in Belokobylskij & Manukyan	Eocene	Prussian Formation (Baltic amber)	Russia (Kaliningrad Oblast)	A member of the family Braconidae belonging to the tribe Chremylini.	
Xanthopimpla zherikhini	Sp. nov	Valid	Manukyan, Dubovikoff & Smirnova	Eocene	Baltic amber	Europe (Baltic Sea region)	A species of Xanthopimpla. Published online in 2026, but the issue date is listed as December 2025.	

==== Megalyroidea ====
Name	Novelty	Status	Authors	Age	Type locality	Country	Notes	Images
Megacoxa brazideci	Sp. nov	Valid	Vilhelmsen et al.	Cretaceous (Albian to Cenomanian)	Kachin amber	Myanmar	A member of the family Megalyridae.	
Megacoxa gungner	Sp. nov	Valid	Vilhelmsen et al.	Cretaceous (Albian to Cenomanian)	Kachin amber	Myanmar	A member of the family Megalyridae.	
Megacoxa miscea	Sp. nov	Valid	Jouault	Cretaceous	Kachin amber	Myanmar	A member of the family Megalyridae.	
Megacoxa mjoelner	Sp. nov	Valid	Vilhelmsen et al.	Cretaceous (Albian to Cenomanian)	Kachin amber	Myanmar	A member of the family Megalyridae.	

==== Pompiloidea ====
Name	Novelty	Status	Authors	Age	Type locality	Country	Notes	Images
Gubuzhu	Gen. et sp. nov	Valid	Xu & Waichert in Xu et al.	Eocene (Bartonian)	Niubao Formation	China	A spider wasp. The type species is G. orientalis.	
Paleoferreolina	Gen. et sp. nov	Valid	Xu & Waichert in Xu et al.	Eocene (Bartonian)	Niubao Formation	China	A spider wasp. The type species is P. xiedensis.	

==== Serphitoidea ====
Name	Novelty	Status	Authors	Age	Type locality	Country	Notes	Images
Axioserphites	Gen. et sp. nov		Álvarez-Parra, Rasnitsyn & Azar	Early Cretaceous (Barremian)	Lebanese amber	Lebanon	A member of the family Serphitidae. The type species is A. obscurus.	

==== Stephanoidea ====
Name	Novelty	Status	Authors	Age	Type locality	Country	Notes	Images
Acanthostephanus	Gen. et sp. nov	Valid	Ge, Ren & Tan	Cretaceous	Kachin amber	Myanmar	A member of the family Stephanidae belonging to the subfamily Schlettereriinae. Genus includes new species A. tenuitubus.	
Burmastephanus	Gen. et sp. nov	Valid	Ge, Ren & Tan	Cretaceous	Kachin amber	Myanmar	A member of the family Stephanidae belonging to the subfamily Stephaninae. Genus includes new species B. breviceps.	
Ohlhoffia minuta	Sp. nov	Valid	Jouault	Cretaceous (Albian-Cenomanian)	Kachin amber	Myanmar	A member of the family Ohlhoffiidae.	
Squamastephanus	Gen. et sp. nov	Valid	Ge, Ren & Tan	Cretaceous	Kachin amber	Myanmar	A member of the family Stephanidae belonging to the subfamily Lagenostephaninae. Genus includes new species S. shihongliangi.	
Tumidistephanus epimetheus	Sp. nov	Valid	Ge & Tan in Ge, Ren & Tan	Cretaceous	Kachin amber	Myanmar	A member of the family Stephanidae.	

==== Vespoidea ====
Name	Novelty	Status	Authors	Age	Type locality	Country	Notes	Images
Siccibythus aristovi	Sp. nov	Valid	Wang, Rasnitsyn, Perkovsky & Vilhelmsen in Wang et al.	Late Cretaceous (Cenomanian)	Kachin amber	Myanmar	A member of the family Falsiformicidae.	
Siccibythus robustus	Sp. nov	Valid	Wang, Rasnitsyn, Perkovsky & Vilhelmsen in Wang et al.	Late Cretaceous (Cenomanian)	Kachin amber	Myanmar	A member of the family Falsiformicidae.	

==== Other Apocrita ====
Name	Novelty	Status	Authors	Age	Type locality	Country	Notes	Images
Chorephialtites	Gen. et sp. nov		Jia, Zhang & Zhang	Early Cretaceous	Yixian Formation	China	A basal member of Apocrita belonging to the family Ephialtitidae. Genus includes new species C. longispinus.	
Crephanogaster beipiaoensis	Sp. nov		Jia, Zhang & Zhang	Early Cretaceous	Yixian Formation	China	A basal member of Apocrita belonging to the family Ephialtitidae.	
Tuphephialtites wangi	Sp. nov		Jia, Zhang & Zhang	Early Cretaceous	Yixian Formation	China	A basal member of Apocrita belonging to the family Ephialtitidae.	
Typhopsenella	Gen. et sp. nov	Valid	Lepeco & Melo	Cretaceous	Kachin amber	Myanmar	A member of Aculeata belonging to the family Holopsenellidae. The type species is T. obscura.	
Uroprionulus	Fam. et gen. et sp. nov		Engel	Early Cretaceous (Barremian)	Lebanese amber	Lebanon	A member of Proctotrupomorpha of uncertain affinities, the type genus of the new family Uroprionulidae. The type species is U. zenobia.	

=== Hymenopteran research ===
- A study on the diversification of hymenopterans throughout their evolutionary history, based on data from the fossil record, is published by Jouault et al. (2025).
- Rasnitsyn & Lara (2025) redescribe Potrerilloxyela menendezi.

== Clade Neuropterida ==
=== Neuropterans ===
Name	Novelty	Status	Authors	Age	Type locality	Country	Notes	Images
Blittersdorffia evanescens	Sp. nov	Valid	Bueno et al.	Early Cretaceous	Crato Formation	Brazil	An antlion.	
Blittersdorffia vulcanoae	Sp. nov	Valid	Bueno et al.	Early Cretaceous	Crato Formation	Brazil	An antlion.	
Cretithone	Gen. et sp. nov	Valid	Li, Shi, Ren & Yang in Li et al.	Late Cretaceous (Cenomanian)	Kachin amber	Myanmar	A member of the family Ithonidae. The type species is C. zhangi.	
Danomantispa	Gen. et sp. nov	Valid	Makarkin, Perkovsky & Nielsen	Eocene	Fur Formation	Denmark	A drepanicine matid fly. The type species is D. frandseni.	
Densipsychops	Gen. et sp. nov	Valid	Liu, Ren & Wang	Middle Jurassic	Jiulongshan Formation	China	A member of the family Osmylopsychopidae. Genus includes new species D. pectinatus.	
Diegopteryx cearensis	Sp. nov	Valid	Bueno et al.	Early Cretaceous	Crato Formation	Brazil	An antlion.	
Diegopteryx pulcherrima	Comb. nov	Valid	(Martins-Neto & Vulcano)	Early Cretaceous	Crato Formation	Brazil	An antlion. Moved from Blittersdorffia pulcherrima (1997); senior synonym of Diegopteryx raptoria (2010).	
Diegopteryx rafaeli	Sp. nov	Valid	Bueno et al.	Early Cretaceous	Crato Formation	Brazil	An antlion.	
Dolganoconis	Gen. et comb. nov	Valid	Makarkin & Perkovsky	Late Cretaceous (Cenomanian)	Nizhnyaya Agapa amber	Russia (Krasnoyarsk Krai)	A member of the family Coniopterygidae; a new genus for "Libanoconis" siberica Makarkin & Perkovsky (2019).	
Eupypsychops oligophlebius	Sp. nov	Valid	Liu, Ren & Wang	Middle Jurassic	Jiulongshan Formation	China	A member of the family Osmylopsychopidae.	
Fiaponeura maculipennis	Sp. nov	Valid	Assmar et al.	Late Cretaceous (Cenomanian)	Kachin amber	Myanmar	A member of Psychopsoidea of uncertain affinities.	
Huiyingosmylus wangi	Sp. nov		Liu, Ren & Wang	Middle Jurassic	Jiulongshan Formation	China	A member of the family Saucrosmylidae.	
Iphigensia	Gen. et sp. nov	Valid	Khramov	Jurassic		Kazakhstan	A member of the family Nymphidae. The type species is I. storozhenkoi.	
Kalligramma margimaculosum	Sp. nov	Valid	Liu, Ren & Wang	Middle Jurassic		China		
Kalligramma plurilocellatum	Sp. nov	Valid	Liu, Ren & Wang	Middle Jurassic		China		
Libanoconis medialis	Sp. nov	Valid	Azar & Engel	Early Cretaceous (Barremian)	Lebanese amber	Lebanon	A member of the family Coniopterygidae.	
Mesypochrysa angusta	Sp. nov		Wang et al.	Middle Jurassic	Jiulongshan Formation	China	A member of the family Chrysopidae.	
Mesypochrysa brevinervis	Comb. nov		(Zhang et al.)	Early Cretaceous	Yixian Formation	China	A member of the family Chrysopidae; moved from Protochrysa brevinervis Zhang et al. (2020).	
Mesypochrysa frandseni	Sp. nov		Makarkin, Simonsen & Perkovsky	Eocene (Ypresian)	Fur Formation	Denmark	A member of the family Chrysopidae.	
Mesypochrysa khramovi	Nom. nov		Makarkin, Simonsen & Perkovsky	Middle–Late Jurassic boundary interval	Daohugou Beds	China	A member of the family Chrysopidae; a replacement name for Mesypochrysa sinica Khramov et al.	
Mesypochrysa paradoxica	Sp. nov		Wang et al.	Middle Jurassic	Jiulongshan Formation	China	A member of the family Chrysopidae.	
Mesypochrysa paucinervis	Sp. nov		Wang et al.	Middle Jurassic	Jiulongshan Formation	China	A green lacewing.	
Mesypochrysa sinica	Comb. nov		(Yang & Hong)	Early Cretaceous		China	A member of the family Chrysopidae; moved from Drakochrysa sinica Yang & Hong (1990).	
Microbabinskaia	Gen. et sp. nov	Valid	Pu et al.	Cretaceous	Kachin amber	Myanmar	A member of the family Babinskaiidae. The type species is M. delicatula.	
Palaeopsychops barthae	Sp. nov	Valid	Archibald & Makarkin	Eocene; Ypresian	Eocene Okanogan Highlands; Klondike Mountain Formation	United States (Washington)	An ithonid giant lacewing	
Palaeopsychops goodwini	Sp. nov	Valid	Archibald & Makarkin	Eocene; Ypresian	Eocene Okanogan Highlands; Klondike Mountain Formation	United States (Washington)	An ithonid giant lacewing	
Phyllithone	Gen. et sp. nov	Valid	Liu et al.	Cretaceous	Kachin amber	Myanmar	An ithonid lacewing. The type species is P. dongshengi.	
Protheristria	Gen. et sp. nov	Valid	Makarkin, Nielsen & Perkovsky	Eocene	Fur Formation	Denmark	A member of the family Mantispidae belonging to the subfamily Drepanicinae. Genus includes new species P. roldae.	
Pseudelectrobabinskaia	Gen. et 2 sp. et comb. nov	Valid	Pu et al.	Cretaceous	Kachin amber	Myanmar	A member of the family Babinskaiidae. The type species is P. suae; genus also includes P. confusa, as well as "Electrobabinskaia" neli Jouault (2022).	
Puripsychops	Gen. et sp. nov	Valid	Liu, Ren & Wang	Middle Jurassic	Jiulongshan Formation	China	A member of the family Osmylopsychopidae. Genus includes new species P. eurypterus.	
Rhachisymphrasis	Gen. et sp. nov		Makarkin & Staniczek	Cretaceous	Kachin amber	Myanmar	A member of the family Mantispidae belonging to the subfamily Symphrasinae. The type species is R. raehlei.	
Rhynchoberotha	Gen. et 2 sp. nov	Valid	Wang et al.	Cretaceous	Kachin amber	Myanmar	A beaded lacewing. Genus includes new species R. zhangae and R. biyi.	
Stygioberotha groehni	Sp. nov	Valid	Makarkin	Cretaceous	Kachin amber	Myanmar	A Paraberothinae beaded lacewing.	
Triachrysa	Gen. et sp. nov	Valid	Makarkin, Simonsen & Perkovsky	Eocene	Fur Formation	Denmark	A nothochrysine green lacewing. The type species is T. rusti.	

==== Neuropteran research ====
- Liu et al. (2025) describe a male specimen of Paradoxoconis longipalpa from the Cretaceous Kachin amber (Myanmar), providing information on wing venation and male genitalia of members of this species.
- Makarkin & Ansorge (2025) redescribe the holotype of Kalligramma haeckeli and revise the subfamily Kalligrammatinae.
- Evidence from the study of larvae preserved in the Cretaceous Kachin amber from Myanmar, interpreted as indicative of greater morphological diversity of nymphid larvae compared to the present, is presented by Buchner et al. (2025).
- Buchner et al. (2025) describe new nemopterid larvae from the Cretaceous amber from Myanmar, expanding known morphological diversity of larvae in this group.
- Bueno et al. (2025) revise the taxonomy of the genera Cratopteryx, Caririneura and Paracaririneura.

=== Raphidiopterans ===
==== Raphidiopteran research ====
- Haug et al. (2025) describe two snakefly pupae from the Cretaceous amber from Myanmar, providing evidence of greater morphological diversity of snakefly pupae in the Cretaceous compared to the present, and probable evidence of differences in the timing of development of Cretaceous snakeflies compared to extant taxa.

=== Other Neuropterida ===
Name	Novelty	Status	Authors	Age	Type locality	Location	Notes	Images
Permoneuroptera	Fam. et gen. et sp. nov	Valid	Peng et al.	Permian	Salagou Formation	France	The type genus of the new family Permoneuropteridae. The type species is P. lapeyriea.	

== Clade †Palaeodictyopteroidea ==
=== †Megasecoptera ===
Name	Novelty	Status	Authors	Age	Type locality	Location	Notes	Images
Aspidothorax hispanicus	Sp. nov	Valid	Santos et al.	Carboniferous (Gzhelian)		Spain	A member of the family Aspidothoracidae.	
Xenoptera latigra	Sp. nov		Petrulevičius & Gutiérrez	Carboniferous (Serpukhovian)	Guandacol 1 Formation	Argentina	A member of the family Xenopteraidae.	

=== †Palaeodictyoptera ===
Name	Novelty	Status	Authors	Age	Type locality	Location	Notes	Images
Dunbaria elkunensis	Sp. nov	Valid	Sinitshenkova	Permian		Russia (Udmurtia)	A member of the family Spilapteridae.	

=== Other †Palaeodictyopteroidea ===
Name	Novelty	Status	Authors	Age	Type locality	Location	Notes	Images
Grandelmoa	Gen. et sp. nov	Valid	Xu, Yang, Oyama, Ren & Béthoux in Xu et al.	Permian (Asselian)	Shanxi Formation	China	A member of Megasecopteromorpha belonging to the group Diaphanopterodea and the family Parelmoidae. The type species is G. jingqii.	

== Clade Palaeoptera ==
=== Ephemeropterans ===
Name	Novelty	Status	Authors	Age	Type locality	Country	Notes	Images
Aikahika	Gen. et sp. nov		Sroka, Agnihotri & Singh	Eocene	Cambay amber	India	A leptophlebiid mayfly. Genus includes new species A. veta.	
Burmella inconspicua	Sp. nov	Valid	Godunko & Staniczek in Godunko et al.	Late Cretaceous (Cenomanian)	Kachin amber	Myanmar	A vietnamellid or pseudironid mayfly.	
Burmella jiangchaoi	Sp. nov	Valid	Chen & Zheng	Cretaceous	Kachin amber	Myanmar	A vietnamellid or pseudironid mayfly.	
Burmella zhouchangfai	Comb. nov	Valid	(Chen & Zheng)	Late Cretaceous (Cenomanian)	Kachin amber	Myanmar	A vietnamellid or pseudironid mayfly; moved from Burmaheptagenia zhouchangfai Chen & Zheng (2023).	
Crephlebia kachinense	Sp. nov		Wu, Huang & Cai	Late Cretaceous (Cenomanian)	Kachin amber	Myanmar	A leptophlebiid mayfly.	
Fujiwaranychia	Gen. et sp. nov		Chen & Zheng	Cretaceous	Kachin amber	Myanmar	An isonychiid mayfly. The type species is F. chiyokoae.	
Nebesna	Gen. et sp. nov	Valid	Godunko et al.	Eocene	Baltic amber	Russia (Kaliningrad Oblast)	A member of the family Ameletopsidae. The type species is N. sotnia.	
Paprika	Gen. et sp. nov	Valid	Chen & Zheng	Cretaceous	Kachin amber	Myanmar	An ameletopsid mayfly. The type species is P. atsukochibae.	
Petracloeon	Gen. et sp. nov	Valid	Sroka & Gattolliat	Late Cretaceous	North Carolina amber	United States (North Carolina)	A baetid mayfly. The type species is P. carolinensis.	
Venusdemilo	Fam. et gen. et sp. nov	Valid	Chen & Zheng	Cretaceous	Kachin amber	Myanmar	A mayfly, the type genus of the new family Venusdemiloidae. The type species is V. venusae. Published online in 2026, but the issue date is listed as December 2025.	
Zhoucloeon	Gen. et sp. nov	Valid	Chen, Zheng & Jiang	Cretaceous	Kachin amber	Myanmar	A baetid mayfly belonging to the subfamily Palaeocloeoninae. Genus includes new species Z. changfai.	

==== Ephemeropteran research ====
- Kluge & Sinitshenkova (2025) identify Hammephemera pulchra as a Triassic member of the mayfly subgroup Anteritorna, name a new family Hammephemeridae, and interpret Tunephemera tungussica as a probable Triassic member of the mayfly subgroup Posteritorna.

=== Odonatopterans ===
Name	Novelty	Status	Authors	Age	Type locality	Country	Notes	Images
Abrohemeroscopus yuanjiawaensis	Sp. nov		Fang, Liu & Zheng	Early Cretaceous	Jiufotang Formation	China	A hemeroscopid dragonfly.	
Burmaeshna bechlyi	Sp. nov	Valid	Nel, Jouault & Azar	Cretaceous (Albian-Cenomanian)	Kachin amber	Myanmar	A member of the family Burmaeshnidae.	
Cordualadensa	Fam. et gen. et sp. nov	Valid	Mueller, Demers-Potvin & Larsson	Late Cretaceous (Campanian)	Dinosaur Park Formation	Canada (Alberta)	A dragonfly belonging to the clade Cavilabiata, the type genus of the new family Cordualadensidae. Genus includes new species C. acorni.	
Danolestes	Gen. et sp. nov	Valid	Simonsen, Archibald & Ware in Simonsen et al.	Eocene (Ypresian)	Fur Formation	Denmark	A member of Lestoidea of uncertain affinities. The type species is D. moelleri.	
Electrocoenagrion rarissimum	Sp. nov	Valid	Liu et al.	Cretaceous		Myanmar	A damselfy belonging to the family Burmacoenagrionidae.	
Gallosynthemis	Gen. et sp. nov	Valid	Nel et al.	Paleocene (Selandian–Thanetian)		France	A dragonfly belonging to the family Synthemistidae. The type species is G. bechlyi.	
Koreapodagrion	Gen. et sp. nov		Nel, Nam & Jouault	Early Cretaceous (Albian)	Jinju Formation	South Korea	A "megapodagrionid" damselfly. The type species is K. coloratus.	
Lestes polonicus	Sp. nov	Valid	Nel et al.	Oligocene	Menilite Formation	Poland	A species of Lestes.	
Mesosticta garciavallsi	Sp. nov	Valid	Monferran, Peñalver & Nel	Late Cretaceous (Cenomanian)	Kachin amber	Myanmar	A damselfly belonging to the family Platystictidae.	
Protolindenia antiqua	Comb. nov	Valid	(Vander Linden)	Late Jurassic (Tithonian)	Solnhofen Limestone	Germany	A dragonfly belonging to the group Petalurida and the family Protolindeniidae; moved from Aeshna antiqua Vander Linden (1827).	
Shundeagrion	Fam. et gen. et sp. nov	Valid	Huang, Lian & Nel	Paleocene	Sanshui Basin	China	Originally described as a damselfly and the type genus of the new family Shundeagrionidae. Subsequently argued to be a member of the family Dysagrionidae. The type species is S. cheni.	
Sinowhetaksa	Gen. et sp. nov	Valid	Nel in Wang et al.	Oligocene (Rupelian)	Ningming Formation	China	A member of the family Whetwhetaksidae. The type species is S. incompleta.	
Stenolestes oeningenensis	Sp. nov		Boderau et al.	Miocene	Öhningen site	Germany	A sieblosiid damselfly.	
Swauka	Gen. et sp. nov	Valid	Archibald et al.	Eocene (Ypresian)	Swauk Formation	United States (Washington)	A gossamerwing damselfly. The type species is S. ypresiana.	
Zhixinphlebia	Fam. et gen. et sp. nov	Valid	Zhang et al.	Early Cretaceous (Albian)	Dalazi Formation	China	A valdicordulioid dragonfly the type genus of the new family Zhixinphlebiidae. The type species is Z. zhangi.	

==== Odonatopteran research ====
- Boderau et al. (2025) describe new fossil material of Saxonagrion minutum from the Permian Salagou Formation (France), and interpret its morphology as supporting the placement of the family Saxonagrionidae within Panodonata.
- Ware et al. (2025) study the composition and internal relationships of Cephalozygoptera, and recover them as a monophyletic group distinct from extant damselflies.

=== Palaeopteran research ===
- A study on the preservation of mayfly and dragonfly fossils from the Lower Cretaceous Crato Formation (Brazil) is published by Storari et al. (2025).

== Clade †Paoliidea ==
=== †Paoliida ===
Name	Novelty	Status	Authors	Age	Type locality	Location	Notes	Images
Permotermopsis gallica	Sp. nov		Boderau et al.	Permian (late Kungurian)	Salagou Formation	France	A member of the family Paoliidae.	

== Clade Paraneoptera ==
=== Hemipterans ===
==== Auchenorrhyncha ====
Name	Novelty	Status	Authors	Age	Type locality	Location	Notes	Images
Cretohylicella	Gen. et sp. nov	Valid	Fu et al.	Early Cretaceous	Yixian Formation	China	A member of Cicadomorpha, tentatively assigned to the family Hylicellidae. The type species is C. lambkini.	
Discotropiduchus	Gen. et sp. nov	Junior synonym	Boderau et al.	Eocene	Baltic amber	Europe (Baltic Sea region)	A planthopper belonging to the family Tropiduchidae. The type species is D. junoi. The genus Discotropiduchus was subsequently considered to be a junior synonym of the genus Tritophania by Boderau et al. (2026).	
Eoplatypleura	Gen. et sp. nov	Valid	Jiang et al.	Eocene (Lutetian)	Messel Formation	Germany	A cicada belonging to the family Cicadidae and the tribe Platypleurini. The type species is E. messelensis.	
Eosassula	Gen. et sp. nov	Valid	Simonsen et al.	Eocene (Ypresian)	Fur Formation	Denmark	A planthopper. The type species is E. szwedoi. Announced in 2025; validated in 2026.	
Gshogpa	Gen. et sp. nov	Valid	Stroiński & Szwedo	Paleocene	Niubao Formation	China	A planthopper belonging to the family Ricaniidae. Genus includes new species G. linqibini.	
Jinjucixius	Gen. et sp. nov		Boderau et al.	Early Cretaceous (Albian)	Jinju Formation	South Korea	A cixiid planthopper. The type species is J. fui.	
Lapicixius yixianensis	Sp. nov	Valid	Boderau, Nel & Fu	Early Cretaceous	Yixian Formation	China	A planthopper belonging to the family Lalacidae.	
Lucidusmacula	Gen. et sp. nov	Valid	Wang, Szwedo & Luo in Wang et al.	Late Cretaceous (Cenomanian)	Kachin amber	Myanmar	A planthopper belonging to the family Katlasidae. The type species is L. lihanjieae.	
Rdo	Gen. et sp. nov	Valid	Stroiński & Szwedo	Paleocene	Niubao Formation	China	A planthopper belonging to the family Ricaniidae. Genus includes new species R. gangniensis.	
Sinocurvicubitus	Gen. et 2 sp. nov		Zhang, Du & Zhang in Zhang et al.	Permian	Leping Formation	China	A member of Cicadomorpha belonging to the superfamily Pereborioidea and the family Curvicubitidae. The type species is S. qingjiangensis; genus also includes S. haotianus Xu, Shih, Ren & Wang in Xu et al. (2025).	
Solitivicia	Gen. et sp. nov	Valid	Criscione-Vastano & Grimaldi	Late Triassic (Norian)	Cow Branch Formation	United States (North Carolina)	A member of Cicadomorpha belonging to the superfamily Scytinopteroidea and the family Ipsviciidae. The type species is S. reducta.	
Stellularis bifurcata	Sp. nov		Ning & Zhang in Lü et al.	Early Cretaceous (Aptian)	Jiufotang Formation	China	A member of the family Procercopidae.	
Stellularis latimaculata	Sp. nov		Du & Zhang in Lü et al.	Early Cretaceous (Aptian)	Jiufotang Formation	China	A member of the family Procercopidae.	
Stellularis pulchra	Sp. nov		Lü & Zhang in Lü et al.	Early Cretaceous (Aptian)	Jiufotang Formation	China	A member of the family Procercopidae.	
Storozhenkella	Gen. et sp. nov	Valid	Shcherbakov	Early Cretaceous		Mongolia	A member of Cicadomorpha belonging to the group Scytinopteroidea and the family Ipsviciidae. The type species is S. phoenix.	
Trichotomus	Gen. et 2 sp. nov	Valid	Wang, Zhuo, Luo & Chen in Wang et al.	Cretaceous	Kachin amber	Myanmar	A planthopper belonging to the family Mimarachnidae. The type species is T. zhuoyuanshengi; genus also includes T. zhuowenxii.	

==== Coleorrhyncha ====
Name	Novelty	Status	Authors	Age	Type locality	Location	Notes	Images
Liassoprogonocimex	Gen. et sp. nov	Valid	Boderau et al.	Early Jurassic (Toarcian)	Schistes bitumineux	Luxembourg	A member of the family Progonocimicidae. The type species is L. bascharagensis.	

==== Heteroptera ====
Name	Novelty	Status	Authors	Age	Type locality	Location	Notes	Images
Cretaloxus	Gen. et sp. nov	Valid	Yin, Bu & Xie	Cretaceous		Myanmar	A member of the family Miridae. Genus includes new species C. wanae.	
Cretozemira gregori	Sp. nov	Valid	Heiss	Cretaceous	Kachin amber	Myanmar	A member of the family Aradidae.	
Daohugoucoris	Gen. et sp. nov	Valid	Dai, Ren & Yao in Dai et al.	Middle Jurassic	Jiulongshan Formation	China	A member of Pentatomomorpha belonging to the family Pachymeridiidae. The type species is D. punctatus.	
Dilatorhynchos	Fam. et gen. et sp. nov		Xian et al.	Cretaceous	Kachin amber	Myanmar	A member of Corixoidea, the type genus of the new family Dilatorhynchidae. The type species is D. anatinus.	
Exornatum	Gen. et sp. nov	Valid	Zhang, Ren & Yao	Cretaceous	Kachin amber	Myanmar	A member of the family Saldidae belonging to the subfamily Saldinae. The type species is E. sulcatum.	
Heterorhynchos	Fam. et gen. et 2 sp. nov		Xian et al.	Cretaceous	Kachin amber	Myanmar	A member of Corixoidea, the type genus of the new family Heterorhynchidae. The type species is H. anderseni; genus also includes H. maculatus.	
Iwakia	Gen. et sp. nov	Valid	Aiba, Souma & Inose	Late Cretaceous (Coniacian)	Tamayama Formation (Iwaki amber)	Japan	A possible member of the family Microphysidae. The type species is I. longilabiata.	
Longifracturus	Gen. et sp. nov	Valid	Dai, Engel & Yao in Dai et al.	Middle Jurassic	Jiulongshan Formation	China	A member of Pentatomomorpha belonging to the family Pachymeridiidae. The type species is L. pilosus.	
Maculocris	Gen. et sp. nov	Valid	Dai, Yao & Ren in Dai et al.	Early Cretaceous (Aptian)	Yixian Formation	China	A member of Pentatomomorpha belonging to the family Kobdocoridae. The type species is M. yixiani.	
Majusculispinatus	Gen. et 2 sp. nov	Valid	Mu, Ren & Yao in Mu et al.	Cretaceous		Myanmar	A member of the family Tingidae. The type species is M. dorsolongispinus; genus also includes M. alirostratus.	
Mongolocoris polhemi	Sp. nov	Valid	Ryzhkova in Ryzhkova, Ivanova & Zhang	Early Cretaceous	Tsagaantsav Formation	Mongolia	A member of the family Enicocoridae.	
Prosthoblissus	Gen. et sp. nov	Valid	Boderau, Nel & Engel	Late Cretaceous (Cenomanian)	Kachin amber	Myanmar	A member of the family Blissidae. The type species is P. primigenius.	
Pulafulvius	Gen. et sp. nov	Valid	Kóbor et al.	Pliocene (Zanclean)	Tapolca Basalt Formation	Hungary	A member of the family Miridae belonging to the subfamily Cylapinae. The type species is P. pliocenicus.	
Rhombocorixa	Nom. nov	Valid	Edkins	Early Cretaceous	La Cantera Formation	Argentina	A member of the family Corixidae; a replacement name for Rhomboidella Mazzoni & Hünicken (1987).	
Rhynchocorixa	Fam. et gen. et 3 sp. nov		Xian et al.	Cretaceous	Kachin amber	Myanmar	A member of Corixoidea, the type genus of the new family Rhynchocorixidae. The type species is R. longirostris; genus also includes R. cobbeni and R. nieseri.	
Shaykayatcoris	Gen. et sp. nov	Valid	Kóbor & Szabó	Late Cretaceous (Cenomanian)	Kachin amber	Myanmar	A member of the family Aradidae belonging to the subfamily Prosympiestinae. The type species is S. michalskii.	
Subtilicoris	Gen. et sp. nov	Valid	Dai, Ren & Yao in Dai et al.	Middle Jurassic	Jiulongshan Formation	China	A member of Pentatomomorpha belonging to the family Pachymeridiidae. The type species is S. actuarius.	
Trichochterus	Gen. et 2 sp. nov		Xian, Chen & Xie in Xian et al.	Cretaceous	Kachin amber	Myanmar	A member of the family Ochteridae. Genus includes new species T. zhengi and T. nieseri.	
Trispongiosus	Gen. et sp. nov	Valid	Zhang, Yao, & Liu in Zhang et al.	Miocene (Burdigalian)	Dominican amber	Dominican Republic	A member of the family Reduviidae belonging to the subfamily Harpactorinae and the tribe Harpactorini. The type species is T. hui.	
Zekuforma	Fam. et gen. et sp. nov		Dai et al.	Miocene	Garang Formation	China	A member of Pentatomoidea, the type genus of the new family Zekuformidae. The type species is Z. maculata.	

==== Sternorrhyncha ====
Name	Novelty	Status	Authors	Age	Type locality	Location	Notes	Images
Amecephala micra	Sp. nov	Valid	Drohojowska et al.	Late Cretaceous (Cenomanian)	Kachin amber	Myanmar	A member of Psyllodea belonging to the family Liadopsyllidae.	
Dormilatusaphis	Gen. et sp. nov	Valid	Węgierek & Ogłaza in Ogłaza, Brożek & Węgierek	Late Cretaceous (Santonian–Campanian)	Ola Formation	Russia (Magadan Oblast)	A member of Aphidomorpha of uncertain affinities. The type species is D. magnamaculta.	
Gregorites michalskii	Sp. nov	Valid	Drohojowska & Szwedo in Drohojowska, Gorzelańczyk & Szwedo	Eocene	Baltic amber	Europe (Gdańsk Bay region)	A whitefly.	
Karaovisiphum	Gen. et sp. nov	Valid	Węgierek in Węgierek et al.	Late Jurassic (Oxfordian)	Karabastau Formation	Kazakhstan	An aphid belonging to the family Oviparosiphidae. The type species is K. inventum.	
Laopsyllidium	Gen. et sp. nov		Hakim & Huang	Middle Jurassic	Daohugou Beds	China	A member of the family Paraprotopsyllidiidae. The type species is L. daohugouensis.	
Melqartaphis	Gen. et sp. nov		Engel et al.	Early Cretaceous	Lebanese amber	Lebanon	A member of Aphidomorpha belonging to the family Tajmyraphididae. The type species is M. media.	
Patsenga	Gen. et sp. nov	Valid	Drohojowska, Franielczyk-Pietyra & Szwedo	Late Cretaceous (Cenomanian)	Kachin amber	Myanmar	A whitefly. The type species is P. danielburckhardti.	
Promissaphis	Gen. et sp. nov	Valid	Węgierek & Ogłaza in Ogłaza, Brożek & Węgierek	Late Cretaceous (Santonian–Campanian)	Ola Formation	Russia (Magadan Oblast)	An aphid belonging to the family Oviparosiphidae. The type species is P. armani.	

==== Hemipteran research ====
- A study on the past diversity dynamics of hemipterans is published by Boderau, Nel & Jouault (2025).
- Boderau et al. (2025) provide new estimates of timing of origin and diversification of hemipterans.
- Fu et al. (2025) describe a forewing of a member of Cicadomorpha from the Permian (Guadalupian) Yinping Formation (China) with morphological resemblance to Sphenophyllum, representing the earliest evidence of leaf mimicry in hemipterans reported to date.
- The first palaeontinid specimen from the Jiufotang Formation (China), assigned to Ilerdocossus cf. fengningensis, is described by Fabrikant & Davranoglou (2025).
- Purported issid planthoppers Libanissus bkassinensis and Cubicostissus palaeocaeni are reinterpreted as members of the families Mimarachnidae and Cicadellidae, respectively, by Shcherbakov (2025).
- Drohojowska et al. (2025) report the first discovery of a whitefly (a specimen of Pudrica christianottoi) from the Bitterfeld amber (Germany).
- Azar (2025) reports the first discovery of a female specimen of Aradus superstes from the Eocene Baltic amber.
- Petrulevičius (2025) reports the first discovery of a male specimen of Chinchekoala qunita from the Eocene Laguna del Hunco Formation (Argentina).
- Boderau et al. (2025) describe a micronectid specimen from the Eocene Baltic amber representing the first reliable fossil record of a member of this group.
- Kim et al. (2025) study the phylogenetic relationships of extant and fossil members of the mirid subfamily Isometopinae, and name a new tribe Electroisopini including Eocene taxa.

=== Psocodea ===
Name	Novelty	Status	Authors	Age	Type locality	Location	Notes	Images
Archaeatropoglaris	Gen. et sp. nov		Hakim, Maalouf & Azar	Early Cretaceous (Barremian)	Lebanese amber	Lebanon	A probable member of the family Empheriidae. The type species is A. libanensis.	
Archipsocus palaeosinicus	Sp. nov		Jouault & Zhuang	Miocene	Zhangpu amber	China	A species of Archipsocus.	
Concavapsocus valvaculeiformus	Sp. nov	Valid	Yang et al.	Cretaceous	Kachin amber	Myanmar	A member of the family Psyllipsocidae.	
Libanopachytrocta	Gen. et sp. nov		Hakim & Azar	Early Cretaceous (Barremian)	Lebanese amber	Lebanon	A member of the family Pachytroctidae. The type species is L. planaspinosa.	
Psyllipsocus mili	Sp. nov	Valid	Weingardt, Liang & Yoshizawa in Weingardt et al.	Late Cretaceous (Cenomanian)	Kachin amber	Myanmar	A species of Psyllipsocus.	

==== Psocodean research ====
- Cai et al. (2025) report the discovery of the oldest louse eggs known to date, found on feathers of a bird belonging to the group Enantiornithes preserved in the Cretaceous Kachin amber from Myanmar.

=== Thysanoptera ===
Name	Novelty	Status	Authors	Age	Type locality	Location	Notes	Images
Areiothrips	Gen. et sp. nov	Valid	Guo et al.	Cretaceous	Kachin amber	Myanmar	A member of the family Melanthripidae. Genus includes new species A. bellator.	
Aspistothrips	Gen. et 2 sp. nov	Valid	Guo et al.	Cretaceous	Kachin amber	Myanmar	A member of the family Melanthripidae. Genus includes new species A. fortis and A. decorus.	
Charismathrips	Gen. et 2 sp. nov	Valid	Guo et al.	Cretaceous	Kachin amber	Myanmar	A member of the family Melanthripidae. Genus includes new species C. longiantennatus and C. exaridus.	
Euthythrips	Gen. et sp. nov	Valid	Guo et al.	Cretaceous	Kachin amber	Myanmar	A member of the family Thripidae. Genus includes new species E. longialatus.	
Minythrips	Gen. et sp. nov	Valid	Guo et al.	Cretaceous	Kachin amber	Myanmar	A member of the family Thripidae. Genus includes new species M. exquisitus.	
Tethysthrips attenboroughi	Sp. nov	Valid	Peñalver, Peña-Kairath, Nel & Nel in Peñalver et al.	Early Cretaceous (Albian)	Utrillas Group	Spain	A member of the family Thripidae.	
Triassocypha	Gen. et 2 sp. nov	Valid	Boderau et al.	Middle Triassic (Ladinian)	Meride Limestone	Switzerland	A member of the stem group of Thysanoptera belonging to the group Lophioneuroptera and the family Iotacyphidae. The type species is T. prima; genus also includes T. secunda.	

== Phasmatodeans ==
Name	Novelty	Status	Authors	Age	Type locality	Location	Notes	Images
Echinosomiscus conicaculeatus	Sp. nov	Valid	Zhang et al.	Cretaceous	Kachin amber	Myanmar	A member of the family Phasmatidae.	
Echinosomiscus longianalis	Sp. nov	Valid	Zhang et al.	Cretaceous	Kachin amber	Myanmar	A member of the family Phasmatidae.	
Yananphasma	Gen. et sp. nov		Guo et al.	Middle Jurassic	Yanan Formation	China	A member of the family Susumaniidae. The type species is Y. chresmodoides.	

== Plecopterans ==
Name	Novelty	Status	Authors	Age	Type locality	Location	Notes	Images
Brachyptera kondratieffi	Sp. nov	Valid	Chen	Eocene	Baltic amber	Lithuania	A species of Brachyptera.	
Carbonoperla	Fam. et gen. et sp. nov	Valid	Sroka et al.	Carboniferous (Moscovian)	Osnabrück Formation	Germany	A stem-stonefly, the type genus of the new family Carbonoperlidae. The type species is C. sowiaki.	
Carbonopteryx	Gen. et sp. nov	Valid	Sroka et al.	Carboniferous (Moscovian)	Osnabrück Formation	Germany	A stem-stonefly belonging to the family Carbonoperlidae. The type species is C. heisingi.	
Graciloperla	Gen. et 2 sp. nov		Chen et al.	Cretaceous		Myanmar	A member of the family Peltoperlidae. Genus includes new species G. bulbosa and G. stylata.	
Heminemoura	Gen. et sp. nov	Valid	Chen	Eocene	Baltic amber	Europe (Baltic Sea region)	A member of the family Nemouridae. Genus includes new species H. triloba. Published online in 2026, but the issue date is listed as December 2025.	
Isoperla lituana	Sp. nov	Valid	Chen	Eocene	Baltic amber	Lithuania	A species of Isoperla.	
Largusoperla vena	Sp. nov	Valid	Chen & Tierno de Figueroa	Cretaceous		Myanmar		
Palaeopsole spinosa	Sp. nov	Valid	Chen	Eocene	Baltic amber	Lithuania	A member of the family Leuctridae.	
Podmosta biloba	Sp. nov	Valid	Chen	Eocene	Baltic amber	Lithuania	A species of Podmosta.	
Vyazonemoura	Gen. et sp. nov	Valid	Sinitshenkova & Yan	Permian	Vyazovka Formation	Russia (Orenburg Oblast)	A member of the family Palaeonemouridae. The type species is V. storozhenkoi.	

=== Plecopteran research ===
- Chen (2025) describes the first well-preserved genuine stonefly larva from the Cretaceous Kachin amber (Myanmar), possibly representing an undescribed perlid lineage with affinities with Caroperla.
- Review of the fossil record, evolutionary history and biogeography of Systellognatha is published by Kirkaldy et al. (2025).

== Clade †Reculida ==
- Lai & Huang (2025) redescribe Shurabia postiretis.

== Other insects ==
Name	Novelty	Status	Authors	Age	Type locality	Country	Notes	Images
Ampatiri	Gen. et sp. nov		Fiorelli et al.	Late Triassic (Carnian)	Chañares Formation	Argentina	Possible lepidopteran scales. The type species is A. eloisae.	
Probnis sauvanyaensis	Sp. nov	Valid	Garrouste et al.	Permian (Guadalupian–?Lopingian)		Spain	A "grylloblattodean" belonging to the family Probnidae.	
Shuozhougrylloblatta	Gen. et sp. nov	Valid	Zhang et al.	Permian		China	A member of Grylloblattida belonging to the family Lemmatophoridae. The type species is S. multifurcata.	
Zygogrylloblatta	Fam. et gen. et sp. nov	Valid	Peng et al.	Cretaceous (Albian-Cenomanian)	Kachin amber	Myanmar	A member of Grylloblattodea, the type genus of the new family Zygogrylloblattidae. The type species is Z. longipalpa.	

== General research ==
- Evidence from the study of insect feeding traces on pteridosperms from the Permian strata from the Crock locality (Thuringian Forest Basin, Germany), interpreted as the oldest unequivocal traces of leaf-mining reported to date, is presented by Laaß et al. (2025).
- Luo et al. (2025) study herbivory traces on foliage from the Permian (Wuchiapingian) Wangjiazhai assemblage (China) and nine other Permian plant assemblages, and report evidence indicating that herbivorous insects preferentially targeted broadleaved gigantopterids.
- Dash et al. (2025) revise known record of traces of insect herbivory on fossil leaves from the Permian strata of the East Bokaro Coalfield (India).
- A new insect assemblage, dominated by beetles and hemipterans, is described from the Triassic Yanchang Formation (Shaanxi, China) by Wang et al. (2025).
- Evidence from the study of fossil record damage of plants caused by insects, indicating that modern patterns of insect herbivory originated by late Middle Jurassic (60 million years before the beginning of angiosperm dominance in plant assemblages), is presented by Xiao et al. (2025).
- Fu et al. (2025) report the discovery of beetle elytra and potential insect fragments from the Lower Cretaceous Duoni Formation (Tibet, China).
- Mnguni et al. (2025) study the taphonomy of Cretaceous insect fossils from the Orapa Diamond Mine (Botswana), reporting evidence of differences in preservation of fossil found in two sediment types which might originate from different environments.
- Oyama et al. (2025) describe an abdomen of an indeterminate insect from the Santonian Hinoshima Formation and an elytron of a beetle from the Campanian Mitsuse Formation, representing the first Mesozoic insects reported from Kyushu (Japan).
- Ni et al. (2025) report the discovery of two new assemblages of Eocene insect fossils from the Hetaoyuan and Wulidun formations (Henan, China).
- Tello et al. (2025) revise the fossil record of insects from Chile.
