= Copelatus chiapas =

Copelatus chiapas Temporal range: Miocene

Scientific classification
- Kingdom: Animalia
- Phylum: Arthropoda
- Clade: Pancrustacea
- Class: Insecta
- Order: Coleoptera
- Suborder: Adephaga
- Family: Dytiscidae
- Genus: Copelatus
- Species: †C. chiapas

Binomial name
- †Copelatus chiapas Hájek et al., 2025

Extinct species of beetle

Copelatus chiapas is an extinct species of Copelatus that lived during the Neogene period.

== Distribution ==
Copelatus chiapas fossils were found in Mexican amber dating back to the Miocene.
