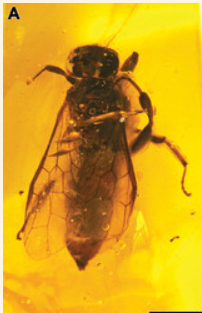

Scientific classification
- Kingdom: Animalia
- Phylum: Arthropoda
- Clade: Pancrustacea
- Class: Insecta
- Order: Hymenoptera
- Family: Anaxyelidae
- Genus: †Orthosyntexis; J. Gao, Engel, Shih, & T. Gao, 2021

= Orthosyntexis =

Genus of insects

Orthosyntexis is an extinct genus of sawflies from the family Anaxyelidae. It comprises several species that were collected from pieces of burmese amber from Myanmar dated 99 million years ago. Their bodies were typically no longer than 6 millimetres (0.24 in), their antennas were around 1.7 millimetres (0.067 in).
