= Pityobiinae =

Scientific classification
- Domain: Eukaryota
- Kingdom: Animalia
- Phylum: Arthropoda
- Class: Insecta
- Order: Coleoptera
- Suborder: Polyphaga
- Infraorder: Elateriformia
- Family: Elateridae
- Subfamily: Pityobiinae; Hyslop, 1917

Subfamily of click beetles

Pityobiinae is a subfamily of click beetles in the family Elateridae. There are at least two genera and two described species in Pityobiinae.

== Genera ==
These two genera belong to the subfamily Pityobiinae:

- Pityobius Leconte, 1854
- Tibionema Solier, 1851
