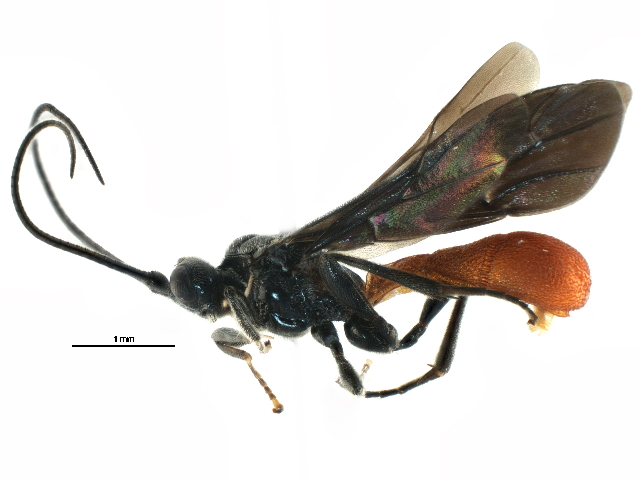
- Sigalphus bicolor from Warren County, Virginia, USA

Scientific classification
- Kingdom: Animalia
- Phylum: Arthropoda
- Clade: Pancrustacea
- Class: Insecta
- Order: Hymenoptera
- Family: Braconidae
- Subfamily: Sigalphinae; Blanchard, 1845

Genera
- See Text

= Sigalphinae =

Subfamily of wasps

Sigalphinae is a subfamily of braconid wasps, containing 8 genera and less than 50 described species.

== Description ==
Species in the subfamily Sigalphinae are rare but have a worldwide distribution. They can be distinguished from other subfamilies of Braconidae by the combination of the hindwing with vein CUb present, the forewing with vein M + CU tubular and second submarginal cell longer than wide, the petiole with a pair of longitudinal carinae, and a metasoma that is not laterally compressed.

All species with known hosts are koinobiont endoparasitoids which attack larval Lepidoptera from the families Noctuidae (most species) and Geometridae (Minanga patriciamadrigalae).

== Genera ==
The following are the currently accepted genera placed in Sigalphinae:

- Acampsis Wesmael, 1835
- Aposigalphus van Achterberg & Austin, 1992
- Malasigalphus van Achterberg & Austin, 1992
- Minanga Cameron, 1906
- Notosigalphus van Achterberg & Austin, 1992
- Paphanus van Achterberg & Riedel, 2009
- Pselaphanus Szépligeti, 1902
- Sigalphus Latreille, 1802
