= Toxesbium =

Toxesbium Temporal range: Cenomanian

Scientific classification
- Kingdom: Animalia
- Phylum: Arthropoda
- Clade: Pancrustacea
- Class: Insecta
- Order: Coleoptera
- Suborder: Polyphaga
- Family: Ptinidae
- Subfamily: Ernobiinae
- Genus: †Toxesbium
- Species: †T. kundratai

Binomial name
- †Toxesbium kundratai Li et al., 2025

Extinct genus of beetle

Toxesbium is an extinct genus of ernobiine that lived during the Cenomanian stage of the Late Cretaceous epoch.

== Distribution ==
Toxesbium kundratai is known from the Burmese amber.
