= Microphorites =

Microphorites Temporal range: Barremian–Eocene

Scientific classification
- Kingdom: Animalia
- Phylum: Arthropoda
- Clade: Pancrustacea
- Class: Insecta
- Order: Diptera
- Family: Dolichopodidae
- Subfamily: Microphorinae
- Genus: †Microphorites; Hennig, 1971

Type species
- †Microphorites extinctus Hennig, 1971

Extinct genus of flies

Microphorites is an extinct genus of flies in the family Dolichopodidae.

== Species ==
- †Microphorites complanipedis Zhang & Wang in Zhang et al., 2025 – Burmese amber, Myanmar, Cenomanian
- †Microphorites curtipedis Zhang & Wang in Zhang et al., 2025 – Burmese amber, Myanmar, Cenomanian
- †Microphorites deploegi Nel, Perrichot, Daugeron & Néraudeau, 2004 – Charentese amber, France, Cenomanian
- †Microphorites erikai Bramuzzo & Nel, 2017 – Oise amber, France, Ypresian
- †Microphorites extinctus Hennig, 1971 – Lebanese amber, Barremian
- †Microphorites hamataculeus Zhang & Wang in Zhang et al., 2025 – Burmese amber, Myanmar, Cenomanian
- †Microphorites magaliae Perrichot & Engel, 2014 – Vendée amber, France, Turonian
- †Microphorites moravicus Tkoč, Nel & Prokop, 2016 – Studlov amber, Czech Republic, Paleocene
- †Microphorites oculeus Grimaldi & Cumming, 1999 – Lebanese amber, Barremian
- †Microphorites pouilloni Ngô-Muller & Nel in Ngô-Muller, Garrouste, Pouillon & Nel, 2020 – Burmese amber, Myanmar, Cenomanian
- †Microphorites similis Grimaldi & Cumming, 1999 – Lebanese amber, Barremian
- †Microphorites utrillensis Peñalver in Arillo, Peñalver & Delclòs, 2008 – San Just amber, Escucha Formation, Spain, Albian
