= Libanissus =

Libanissus Temporal range: Barremian

Scientific classification
- Kingdom: Animalia
- Phylum: Arthropoda
- Clade: Pancrustacea
- Class: Insecta
- Order: Hemiptera
- Suborder: Auchenorrhyncha
- Infraorder: Fulgoromorpha
- Family: †Mimarachnidae
- Genus: †Libanissus
- Species: †L. bkassinensis

Binomial name
- †Libanissus bkassinensis Azar et al., 2024

Extinct genus of mimarachnid insect

Libanissus is an extinct monotypic genus of mimarachnid insect that lived in Lebanon during the Barremian stage of the Early Cretaceous epoch.

== Taxonomy ==
Libanissus was initially classified as an issid at the time of its description, though a more recent paper suggests it was a mimarachnid instead.
