= Aulosaphes =

Scientific classification
- Domain: Eukaryota
- Kingdom: Animalia
- Phylum: Arthropoda
- Class: Insecta
- Order: Hymenoptera
- Family: Braconidae
- Genus: Aulosaphes; Muesebeck, 1935

Genus of wasps

Aulosaphes is a genus of wasps belonging to the family Braconidae.

Species:

- Aulosaphes chinensis Chen, 1996
- Aulosaphes convergens van Achterberg, 1995
- Aulosaphes deserticola Papp, 1991
- Aulosaphes fujianensis Chen, 1996
- Aulosaphes psychidivorus Muesebeck, 1935
- Aulosaphes rasuli van Achterberg, 1995
- Aulosaphes semifasciatus van Achterberg, 1995
- Aulosaphes unicolor (Ashmead, 1905)
- Aulosaphes vechti van Achterberg, 1995
- Aulosaphes wellsae van Achterberg, 1995
