= Sirenobethylus =

Scientific classification
- Domain: Eukaryota
- Kingdom: Animalia
- Phylum: Arthropoda
- Class: Insecta
- Order: Hymenoptera
- Suborder: Apocrita
- Infraorder: Aculeata
- Superfamily: Chrysidoidea
- Family: †Sirenobethylidae; Wu, Vilhelmsen & Gao, 2025
- Genus: †Sirenobethylus; Wu, Vilhelmsen & Gao, 2025
- Species: †S. charybdis

Binomial name
- †Sirenobethylus charybdis Wu, Vilhelmsen & Gao, 2025

Extinct genus of wasps

Sirenobethylus charybdis is an extinct species of wasp. It had a unique anatomical feature on its abdomen that may have acted as a grasping device.

== Discovery ==
The fossil of Sirenobethylus charybdis was discovered in a piece of amber from the Kachin State of northern Myanmar, dated to around 99 million years ago during the mid-Cretaceous period. The specimen was preserved in remarkable detail, allowing scientists to examine its distinctive abdominal appendages, which resembled the snap-trap mechanism of a Venus flytrap. Researchers suggested these features may have been used to grasp or immobilize prey during parasitism, similar to behaviors seen in some modern wasps.
