= Lalacidae =

Scientific classification
- Domain: Eukaryota
- Kingdom: Animalia
- Phylum: Arthropoda
- Class: Insecta
- Order: Hemiptera
- Suborder: Auchenorrhyncha
- Infraorder: Fulgoromorpha
- Superfamily: Delphacoidea
- Family: †Lalacidae; Hamilton, 1990

Extinct family of planthoppers

Lalacidae is an extinct family of planthoppers. It was first described by Hamilton in 1990. It contains 3 subfamilies, 4 tribes, and 9 genera.

== Classification ==
- † Ancoralinae Hamilton, 1990
  - † Ancoralini Hamilton, 1990
    - † Ancorale Hamilton, 1990
  - † Kinnarocixiini Hamilton, 1990
    - † Kinnarocixius Hamilton, 1990
- † Lalacinae Hamilton, 1990
  - † Carpopodini Hamilton, 1990
    - † Carpopodus Hamilton, 1990
    - † Psestocixius Hamilton, 1990
  - † Lalacini Hamilton, 1990
    - † Lalax Hamilton, 1990
    - † Patulopes Hamilton, 1990
- † Protodelphacinae Hamilton, 1990
  - † Protodelphax Hamilton, 1990
- incertae sedis
  - † Cretocixius Zhang, 2002
  - † Vulcanoia Martins-Neto, 1988
