= Calosoma winnicaensis =

Calosoma winnicaensis Temporal range: Oligocene

Scientific classification
- Kingdom: Animalia
- Phylum: Arthropoda
- Class: Insecta
- Order: Coleoptera
- Suborder: Adephaga
- Family: Carabidae
- Genus: Calosoma
- Species: †C. winnicaensis

Binomial name
- †Calosoma winnicaensis

Extinct species of ground beetle

Calosoma winnicaensis is an extinct species of ground beetle (Carabidae) that lived in the Menilite Formation (Poland) during the Oligocene epoch.

The discovery of C. winnicaensis seems to confirm that the European ground beetle (Calosoma specifically) diversity was high during the Oligocene epoch.
