= 2026 in paleoentomology =

This paleoentomology list records new fossil insect taxa that were announced or described during the year 2026, as well as notes other significant paleoentomology discoveries and events which occurred during the year.

== Clade Amphiesmenoptera ==
=== Lepidopterans ===
| Name | Novelty | Status | Authors | Age | Type locality | Country | Notes | Images |
|---|---|---|---|---|---|---|---|---|
| Apaturoides | Gen. et sp. nov | Valid | Rajaei et al. | Oligocene (Rupelian) | | France | A member of the family Nymphalidae belonging to the subfamily Apaturinae. The type species is A. monikae. | |
| Archmosaicus salicifolius | Sp. nov | Valid | Luo et al. | Cretaceous | Kachin amber | Myanmar | A member of the family Micropterigidae. | |
| Electronotodonta | Gen. et sp. nov | Valid | Fischer & Hausmann | Miocene | Dominican amber | Dominican Republic | A member of the family Notodontidae. The type species is E. jimmilleri. | |
| Glaesopterix | Gen. et sp. nov | Valid | Fischer & Kurz | Eocene | Baltic amber | Russia (Kaliningrad Oblast) | A member of the family Micropterigidae. The type species is G. jonasdamzeni. | |
| Micropterix eocenica | Sp. nov | Valid | Kurz & Fischer | Eocene | Baltic amber | Russia (Kaliningrad Oblast) | A member of the family Micropterigidae. | |
| Ogivaluncus | Fam. et gen. et sp. nov | Valid | Nel et al. | Eocene | Oise amber | France | A possible member of the superfamily Yponomeutoidea; the type genus of the new family Ogivaluncidae. The type species is O. eocenicus. | |
| Proutia altera | Sp. nov | Valid | Arnscheid et al. | Eocene | Rovno amber | Ukraine | A member of the family Psychidae. | |
| Proutia damzeni | Sp. nov | Valid | Arnscheid et al. | Eocene | Rovno amber | Ukraine | A member of the family Psychidae. | |
| Sabatinca filantenna | Sp. nov | Valid | Luo et al. | Cretaceous | Kachin amber | Myanmar | A species of Sabatinca. | |

==== Lepidopteran research ====
- Haug et al. (2026) report evidence from the study of caterpillars preserved in different types of amber indicative of increase of maximum length of protruding structures of caterpillars (such as hairs or spines) through time, and of increase of abundance of caterpillars relative to lacewing larvae through time.
- Takahashi, Saito & Aiba (2026) describe a forewing of Aporia potanini from the Pliocene-Pleistocene strata of the Teragi Group (Japan), representing the oldest fossil record of an extant butterfly species reported to date.

=== Trichopterans ===
| Name | Novelty | Status | Authors | Age | Type locality | Country | Notes | Images |
|---|---|---|---|---|---|---|---|---|
| Archiphilopotamus sagulicus | Sp. nov | Valid | Sukatsheva in Sukatsheva, Rasnitsyn & Vasilenko | Early Jurassic | | Kyrgyzstan | A member of the family Philopotamidae. Published online in 2026, but the issue date is listed as December 2025. | |
| Cladochorista aliki | Sp. nov | Valid | Sukatsheva & Vasilenko | Early Triassic | | Russia | A member of the family Cladochoristidae. | |
| Cladochorista rasnitsyni | Sp. nov | Valid | Sukatsheva & Vasilenko | Early Triassic | | Russia | A member of the family Cladochoristidae. | |
| Phylocentropus alepavlrasnia | Sp. nov | Valid | Melnitsky, Ivanov & Melnitskaya | Late Cretaceous (Santonian) | Kheta Formation (Taymyr amber) | Russia (Krasnoyarsk Krai) | | |
| Setodes wilfriedwichardi | Sp. nov | Valid | Melnitsky et al. | Eocene (Priabonian) | Danish amber | Denmark | A member of the family Leptoceridae. | |

=== Other amphiesmenopterans ===
| Name | Novelty | Status | Authors | Age | Type locality | Country | Notes | Images |
|---|---|---|---|---|---|---|---|---|
| Kinitocelis robustivena | Sp. nov | | Jia et al. | Mid-Cretaceous | Kachin amber | Myanmar | A member of the family Tarachocelidae. | |
| Retortocelis confluvena | Sp. nov | | Jia et al. | Mid-Cretaceous | Kachin amber | Myanmar | A member of the family Tarachocelidae. | |
| Retortocelis ventricosa | Sp. nov | | Jia et al. | Mid-Cretaceous | Kachin amber | Myanmar | A member of the family Tarachocelidae. | |

== Clade Antliophora ==
=== Dipterans ===
==== Brachycerans ====
| Name | Novelty | Status | Authors | Age | Type locality | Country | Notes | Images |
|---|---|---|---|---|---|---|---|---|
| Alavesia belone | Sp. nov | Valid | Engel & Peretti | Cretaceous | Kachin amber | Myanmar | A member of the family Atelestidae. | |
| Alavesia hkamtiensis | Sp. nov | Valid | Engel & Peretti | Cretaceous | Hkamti amber | Myanmar | A member of the family Atelestidae. | |
| Anthalia rasnitsyni | Sp. nov | Valid | Shamshev, Vorontsov & Perkovsky | Eocene | Rovno amber | Ukraine | A member of the family Hybotidae. | |
| Avenaphora spinifemorata | Sp. nov | Valid | Aiba | Late Cretaceous (Coniacian) | Tamayama Formation | Japan | A member of the family Dolichopodidae. | |
| Chaetosepsis | Gen. et sp. nov | Valid | Grimaldi, Lonsdale & Herhold | Miocene | Dominican amber | Dominican Republic | A member of the family Sepsidae. The type species is C. caribea. | |
| Chikunius | Fam. et gen. et sp. nov | | Feng, Yang, Engel, Ren & Wang in Feng et al. | Late Cretaceous (Cenomanian) | Kachin amber | Myanmar | An early-diverging relative of Asiloidea and Eremoneura, preserving evidence of adaptations to hematophagy in both sexes; the type genus of the new family Chikuniidae. The type species is C. yangi. | |
| Futababombylia | Gen. et sp. nov | Valid | Aiba, Inose & Watanabe | Late Cretaceous (Coniacian) | Tamayama Formation | Japan | A member of the family Bombyliidae. The type species is F. kishini. | |
| Iteaphila rovnoensis | Sp. nov | Valid | Shamshev, Vorontsov & Perkovsky | Eocene | Rovno amber | Ukraine | | |
| Milichiella brakeae | Sp. nov | Valid | Gomes | Miocene | Mexican amber | Mexico | A member of the family Milichiidae. | |
| Paleothereva | Gen. et sp. nov | Valid | Feng, Ren & Wang in Feng et al. | Late Cretaceous (Cenomanian) | Kachin amber | Myanmar | A member of the family Therevidae. The type species is P. longicoxa. | |
| Paraiteaphila sinclairi | Sp. nov | Valid | Shamshev, Vorontsov & Perkovsky | Eocene | Rovno amber | Ukraine | | |
| Protapsilocephala | Gen. et sp. nov | Valid | Feng et al. | Cretaceous | Kachin amber | Myanmar | A member of the family Apsilocephalidae. The type species is P. longisetosa. | |

==== Nematocerans ====
| Name | Novelty | Status | Authors | Age | Type locality | Country | Notes | Images |
|---|---|---|---|---|---|---|---|---|
| Acnemia silobusi | Sp. nov | Valid | Blagoderov & Evenhuis | Eocene | Baltic amber | Europe (Baltic Sea region) | | |
| Allodia meunieri | Sp. nov | Valid | Blagoderov & Evenhuis | Eocene | Baltic amber | Europe (Baltic Sea region) | | |
| Brachypogon europaeus | Sp. nov | Valid | Szadziewski, Santer, Nel, & Krzemiński in Szadziewski et al. | Eocene | Oise amber | France | A species of Brachypogon. | |
| Brachypogon oisensis | Sp. nov | Valid | Szadziewski, Santer, Nel, & Krzemiński in Szadziewski et al. | Eocene | Oise amber | France | A species of Brachypogon. | |
| Brachypogon parisiensis | Sp. nov | Valid | Szadziewski, Santer, Nel, & Krzemiński in Szadziewski et al. | Eocene | Oise amber | France | A species of Brachypogon. | |
| Cascoplecia gracilis | Sp. nov | Valid | Skartveit | Cretaceous | | Myanmar | A member of the family Bibionidae. | |
| Cascoplecia tridens | Sp. nov | Valid | Skartveit | Cretaceous | | Myanmar | A member of the family Bibionidae. | |
| Cheilotrichia wightensis | Nom. nov | Valid | Oosterbroek & Krzemiński in Krzemiński et al. | Eocene | Bouldnor Formation | United Kingdom | A replacement name for Cheilotrichia duplicata Krzemiński in Krzemiński et al. (2019). | |
| Cretolimonia dayana | Sp. nov | Valid | Kopeć in Kopeć et al. | Jurassic/Cretaceous boundary | Glushkovo Formation | Russia (Zabaykalsky Krai) | A member of the family Limoniidae. Announced online in 2021; validated in 2026. | |
| Cretolimonia lukashevichae | Sp. nov | Valid | Kopeć & Krzemiński in Kopeć et al. | Jurassic/Cretaceous boundary | Dain Formation | Russia (Zabaykalsky Krai) | A member of the family Limoniidae. Announced online in 2021; validated in 2026. | |
| Cretolimonia mikolajczyki | Sp. nov | Valid | Kopeć, Krzemiński, Soszyńska in Kopeć et al. | Late Cretaceous (Cenomanian) | Kachin amber | Myanmar | A member of the family Limoniidae. Announced online in 2021; validated in 2026. | |
| Cretolimonia pseudojurassica | Sp. nov | Valid | Krzemiński in Kopeć et al. | Jurassic/Cretaceous boundary | Dain Formation | Russia (Zabaykalsky Krai) | A member of the family Limoniidae. Announced online in 2021; validated in 2026. | |
| Dasyhelea eocenica | Sp. nov | Valid | Szadziewski, Santer, Nel, & Krzemiński in Szadziewski et al. | Eocene | Oise amber | France | A species of Dasyhelea. | |
| Dianepsia electrica | Sp. nov | Valid | Blagoderov & Evenhuis | Eocene | Baltic amber | Europe (Baltic Sea region) | | |
| Dianepsia tatianae | Sp. nov | Valid | Blagoderov & Evenhuis | Eocene | Baltic amber | Europe (Baltic Sea region) | | |
| Dicranomyia britannica | Nom. nov | Valid | Krzemiński & Oosterbroek in Krzemiński et al. | Eocene | Bouldnor Formation | United Kingdom | A replacement name for Dicranomyia fasciata Krzemiński in Krzemiński et al. (2019). | |
| Elephantomyia christelae | Sp. nov | Valid | Kania-Kłosok & Krzemiński in Kopeć et al. | Eocene | Baltic amber | Europe (Baltic Sea region) | A species of Elephantomyia. Announced online in 2021; validated in 2026. | |
| Elephantomyia prima | Sp. nov | Valid | Kania-Kłosok & Krzemiński in Kopeć et al. | Eocene | Baltic amber | Europe (Baltic Sea region) | A species of Elephantomyia. Announced online in 2021; validated in 2026. | |
| Eosphaeromias | Gen. et sp. nov | Valid | Szadziewski, Santer, Nel, & Krzemińska in Szadziewski et al. | Eocene | Oise amber | France | A member of the family Ceratopogonidae. The type species is E. eocenicus. | |
| Forcipomyia oisensis | Sp. nov | Valid | Szadziewski, Santer, Nel, & Krzemiński in Szadziewski et al. | Eocene | Oise amber | France | A species of Forcipomyia. | |
| Grimmenia laiyangensis | Comb. nov | Valid | (Hong & Wang) | | | China | A member of the family Limoniidae; moved from Mesotrichocera laiyangensis Hong & Wang (1990) | |
| Groveriella oisensis | Sp. nov | Valid | Hébert, Ngô-Muller & Nel | Eocene | Oise amber | France | A species of Groveriella. | |
| Helius ibericus | Sp. nov | Valid | Kania-Kłosok, Krzemiński & Arillo in Krzemiński et al. | Early Cretaceous (Albian) | Utrillas Group (Álava amber) | Spain | Announced in 2021 under the name Helius hispanicus; validated in 2026. | |
| Helius turolensis | Sp. nov | Valid | Kania-Kłosok, Krzemiński & Arillo in Krzemiński et al. | Early Cretaceous (Albian) | Utrillas Group (Álava amber) | Spain | Announced in 2021; validated in 2026. | |
| Kelneria erroris | Sp. nov | Valid | Pełczyńska, Krzemiński & Soszyńska in Pełczyńska et al. | Eocene | Baltic amber | Russia (Kaliningrad Oblast) | A member of the family Keroplatidae. | |
| Kelneria rovnensis | Sp. nov | Valid | Pełczyńska & Perkovsky in Pełczyńska et al. | Eocene | Rovno amber | Ukraine | A member of the family Keroplatidae. | |
| Kelneria szymoni | Sp. nov | Valid | Pełczyńska, Krzemiński & Soszyńska in Pełczyńska et al. | Eocene | Baltic amber | Europe (Baltic Sea region) | A member of the family Keroplatidae. | |
| Leptoconops oisensis | Sp. nov | Valid | Szadziewski, Santer, Nel, & Krzemiński in Szadziewski et al. | Eocene | Oise amber | France | A species of Leptoconops. | |
| Loewiella baltica | Sp. nov | Valid | Blagoderov & Evenhuis | Eocene | Baltic amber | Europe (Baltic Sea region) | | |
| Loewiella montypythoni | Sp. nov | Valid | Blagoderov & Evenhuis | Eocene | Baltic amber | Europe (Baltic Sea region) | | |
| Lyprauta meunieri | Sp. nov | Valid | Blagoderov & Evenhuis | Eocene | Baltic amber | Europe (Baltic Sea region) | | |
| Lyprauta rossi | Sp. nov | Valid | Blagoderov & Evenhuis | Eocene | Baltic amber | Europe (Baltic Sea region) | | |
| Macrocera barteki | Sp. nov | Valid | Pełczyńska in Pełczyńska, Krzemiński & Soszyńska | Eocene | Baltic amber | Europe (Baltic Sea region) | A species of Macrocera. | |
| Macrocera furastica | Sp. nov | Valid | Pełczyńska, Krzemiński & Soszyńska | Eocene | Fur Formation | Denmark | A species of Macrocera. | |
| Macrocera hoffeinsorum | Sp. nov | Valid | Pełczyńska, Krzemiński & Soszyńska | Eocene | Baltic amber | Europe (Baltic Sea region) | A species of Macrocera. | |
| Macrocera poseidonis | Sp. nov | Valid | Pełczyńska, Krzemiński & Soszyńska | Eocene | Baltic amber | Europe (Baltic Sea region) | A species of Macrocera. | |
| Macrocera stuckinamberi | Sp. nov | Valid | Pełczyńska, Krzemiński & Soszyńska | Eocene | Baltic amber | Europe (Baltic Sea region) | A species of Macrocera. | |
| Macrocera tymoni | Sp. nov | Valid | Pełczyńska in Pełczyńska, Krzemiński & Soszyńska | Eocene | Baltic amber | Europe (Baltic Sea region) | A species of Macrocera. | |
| Minyohelea anagarciae | Sp. nov | Valid | Szadziewski & Arillo | Early Cretaceous | | Spain | A member of the family Ceratopogonidae. | |
| Orimarguloides orthogonius | Sp. nov | Valid | Men et al. | Cretaceous | | Myanmar | A member of the family Limoniidae. | |
| Palaeoempalia abavus | Sp. nov | Valid | Blagoderov & Evenhuis | Eocene | Baltic amber | Europe (Baltic Sea region) | | |
| Palaeopoecilostola hoffeinsorum | Sp. nov | Valid | Kania-Kłosok & Krzemiński in Kania-Kłosok, Wąsacz & Krzemiński | Eocene | Baltic amber | Europe (Baltic Sea region) | A member of the family Limoniidae belonging to the subfamily Limnophilinae. | |
| Proptychopterina jiyuanensis | Sp. nov | Valid | Xu, Peng & Huang | Middle Jurassic | Yangshuzhuang Formation | China | A member of the family Ptychopteridae. | |
| Protipula oosterbroeki | Sp. nov | Valid | Krzemiński, Kopeć & Ansorge in Krzemiński et al. | Late Jurassic | Karabastau Formation | Kazakhstan | | |
| Rhopaloscatopse | Gen. et 3 sp. nov | Valid | Haenni & Hoffeins | Eocene | Baltic amber | Europe (Baltic Sea region) | A member of the family Scatopsidae. Genus includes new species R. podenasi, R. krzeminskorum and R. szadziewskii. | |
| Sciara katoi | Sp. nov | Valid | Aiba & Menzel | Pleistocene | Miyajima Formation | Japan | A species of Sciara. | |
| Sciara statzi | Nom. nov | Valid | Aiba & Menzel | Oligocene | Rott Formation | Germany | A species of Sciara; a replacement name for Lycoria thoracica Statz (1944). | |
| Simulium oisense | Sp. nov | Valid | Nel, Hebert & Ngô Muller | Eocene | Oise amber | France | A species of Simulium. | |
| Stilobezzia eocenica | Sp. nov | Valid | Szadziewski, Santer, Nel, & Krzemiński in Szadziewski et al. | Eocene | Oise amber | France | A species of Stilobezzia. | |
| Styringomyia caribeana | Sp. nov | Valid | Kopeć et al. | Miocene (Burdigalian) | Dominican amber | Dominican Republic | A species of Styringomyia. | |
| Styringomyia caridadi | Sp. nov | Valid | Kopeć et al. | Miocene (Burdigalian) | Dominican amber | Dominican Republic | A species of Styringomyia. | |
| Styringomyia grimaldii | Sp. nov | Valid | Kopeć et al. | Miocene (Burdigalian) | Dominican amber | Dominican Republic | A species of Styringomyia. | |
| Synapha chandleri | Sp. nov | Valid | Blagoderov & Evenhuis | Eocene | Baltic amber | Europe (Baltic Sea region) | | |
| Synapha fimbriosa | Sp. nov | Valid | Blagoderov & Evenhuis | Eocene | Baltic amber | Europe (Baltic Sea region) | | |
| Tanystroma | Gen. et sp. nov | Valid | Kaczmarek, Krzemiński & Soszyńska | Late Cretaceous (Cenomanian) | Kachin amber | Myanmar | A member of the stem group of Tanyderidae. The type species is T. groehni. | |
| Thaumastoptera burmanica | Sp. nov | Valid | Men, Sun & Starkevich | Cretaceous (Albian-Cenomanian) | Kachin amber | Myanmar | | |
| Tipula gentilinii | Sp. nov | Valid | Kania-Kłosok, Krzemiński & Kopeć in Kania-Kłosok et al. | Miocene (Messinian) | Gessoso-Solfifera Formation | Italy | | |
| Tipula jarzembowskii | Nom. nov | Valid | Kania-Kłosok & Nel in Krzemiński et al. | Oligocene | | Turkey | A replacement name for Tipula oligocenica Kania & Nel (2013) | |
| Tipula lukasiewiczi | Sp. nov | Valid | Kania-Kłosok, Krzemiński & Salwa in Kania-Kłosok et al. | Oligocene (Rupelian) | Menilite Formation | Poland | | |
| Trichoneura xavieri | Sp. nov | Valid | Kania-Kłosok, Krzemiński, Kopeć & Arillo in Kopeć et al. | Early Cretaceous (Albian) | Utrillas Group | Spain | A species of Trichoneura. Announced online in 2021; validated in 2026. | |
| Xenosycorax bouareji | Sp. nov | Valid | Tabakian, Wang & Azar | Early Cretaceous (Barremian) | Lebanese amber | Lebanon | A member of the family Psychodidae belonging to the subfamily Sycoracinae. | |

==== Dipteran research ====
- Revision of taxonomy of Jurassic members of the genus Eoptychopterina is published by Lukashevich & Ansorge (2026).
- Peixoto et al. (2026) interpret trace fossils from the Lower Cretaceous Botucatu Formation (Brazil) assigned to the ichnotaxon Cochlichnus anguineus as likely produced by larvae of members of the family Therevidae.
- Revision of members of the genus Prohercostomus from the Baltic amber is published by Grichanov (2026).
- Grichanov (2026) reports the discovery of a male of Medeterites latipennis from the Baltic amber, and provides a key to species belonging to the genus Medeterites.
- Men et al. (2026) describe first female of Palaeoglaesum sp. from mid-Cretaceous Burmese amber.

=== Mecopterans ===
| Name | Novelty | Status | Authors | Age | Type locality | Location | Notes | Images |
|---|---|---|---|---|---|---|---|---|
| Mesorpa | Gen. et sp. nov | | Xu, Zhao & Bashkuev | Late Cretaceous (Santonian–Campanian) | Nenjiang Formation | China | A member of the family Orthophlebiidae. Genus includes new species M. nenjiangensis. | |

== Clade Archaeorthoptera ==
=== †Caloneurodea ===
| Name | Novelty | Status | Authors | Age | Type locality | Country | Notes | Images |
|---|---|---|---|---|---|---|---|---|
| Omalia alexrasnitsyni | Sp. nov | Valid | Sampson et al. | Carboniferous (Moscovian) | | Germany | | |
| ?Paraspiculum carloherdi | Sp. nov | Valid | Sampson et al. | Carboniferous (Moscovian) | | Germany | | |

=== Orthoptera ===
| Name | Novelty | Status | Authors | Age | Type locality | Country | Notes | Images |
|---|---|---|---|---|---|---|---|---|
| Aestuacrida mikronaulion | Sp. nov | Valid | Schall et al. | Early Cretaceous (Aptian) | Crato Formation | Brazil | A member of the family Locustopsidae. | |
| Angustisquama | Gen. et 2 sp. nov | Valid | Yuan, Ma & Gu in Yuan et al. | Late Cretaceous (Cenomanian) | Kachin amber | Myanmar | A member of Grylloidea belonging to the family Mogoplistidae. The type species is A. bicolorata; genus also includes A. wangruoxii Hu, Chen, Zhuo & He (2026). | |
| Argentoelcana | Gen. et sp. nov | | Schall et al. | Early Cretaceous | Crato Formation | Brazil | A member of the family Elcanidae. Genus includes new species A. intermedia. | |
| Auroralocusta | Gen. et sp. nov | Valid | Schall et al. | Early Cretaceous | Crato Formation | Brazil | A member of the family Locustopsidae. Genus includes new species A. restituta. | |
| Baltoparalethus | Gen. et sp. nov | Valid | Schall, Husemann & Bonino | Eocene | Baltic amber | Russia (Kaliningrad Oblast) | A probable member of the family Episactidae and the subfamily Episactinae. The type species is B. alessioboninoi. | |
| Birmanimogoplistes | Gen. et sp. nov | Valid | Yuan, Ma & Gu in Yuan et al. | Late Cretaceous (Cenomanian) | Kachin amber | Myanmar | A member of the family Mogoplistidae. The type species is B. acutifolius. | |
| Cratomastax | Gen. et sp. nov | Valid | Schall et al. | Early Cretaceous (Aptian) | Crato Formation | Brazil | A member of Caelifera belonging to the superfamily Eumastacoidea. The type species is C. mariellaae. | |
| Cretoornebius | Gen. et sp. nov | Valid | Hu, Chen & He in Hu et al. | Late Cretaceous (Cenomanian) | Kachin amber | Myanmar | A member of the family Mogoplistidae. The type species is C. huzhengkuni Hu, Chen, Zhuo & He. | |
| Crinitipes | Gen. et sp. nov | Valid | Yuan, Ma & Gu in Yuan et al. | Late Cretaceous (Cenomanian) | Kachin amber | Myanmar | A member of the family Mogoplistidae. The type species is C. calvus. | |
| Diamogoplistes | Gen. et sp. nov | Valid | Hu, Chen & He in Hu et al. | Late Cretaceous (Cenomanian) | Kachin amber | Myanmar | A member of the family Mogoplistidae. The type species is D. shiruolinae Hu, Chen, Zhuo & He. | |
| Elongatitarsus | Gen. et sp. nov | | Yuan et al. | Mid-Cretaceous | Kachin amber | Myanmar | A member of the family Gryllidae. Genus includes new species E. falcatus. | |
| Ensiferelcana | Gen. et sp. nov | | Schall et al. | Early Cretaceous | Crato Formation | Brazil | A member of the family Elcanidae. Genus includes new species E. brachyptera. | |
| Gondwanelcana | Gen. et sp. nov | | Schall et al. | Early Cretaceous | Crato Formation | Brazil | A member of the family Elcanidae. Genus includes new species G. brasiliensis. | |
| Grylloprophalangopsis | Gen. et sp. nov | | Zhang et al. | Late Cretaceous (Santonian–Campanian) | Nenjiang Formation | China | A member of the family Prophalangopsidae. The type species is G. cantator. | |
| Juralocustavus | Gen. et sp. nov | Valid | Nel, Xu & Huang | Middle Jurassic | Yangshuzhuang Formation | China | A member of the family Locustavidae. Genus includes new species J. rasnitsyni. | |
| Longioculus poinari | Sp. nov | Valid | Schall & Husemann | Cretaceous | Hkamti amber or Kachin amber | Myanmar | A member of the family Elcanidae. | |
| Mesembrelcana | Gen. et comb. nov | | Schall et al. | Early Cretaceous | Crato Formation | Brazil | A member of the family Elcanidae; a new genus for "Cratoelcana" rasnitsyni Nel & Jouault. | |
| Mesolocustopsis levis | Sp. nov | Valid | Schall et al. | Early Cretaceous | Crato Formation | Brazil | A member of the family Locustopsidae. | |
| Mesotanaocerus | Gen. et sp. nov | Valid | Li et al. | Mid-Cretaceous (Albian-Cenomanian) | Kachin amber | Myanmar | A member of the family Tanaoceridae. The type species is M. yiweizhangae. | |
| Monolophomastax | Gen. et sp. nov | | Schall, Bonino & Husemann | Cretaceous | Kachin amber | Myanmar | A member of Eumastacoidea. Genus includes new species M. disantoi. | |
| Panorpidium damianii | Comb. nov | | (Martins-Neto) | Early Cretaceous | | Brazil | A member of the family Elcanidae; moved from Cratoelcana damianii Martins-Neto (1991). | |
| ?Panorpidium polonicum | Sp. nov | Valid | Michalska in Michalska & Błażejowski | Late Jurassic (Tithonian) | Kcynia Formation | Poland | A member of the family Elcanidae. | |
| Parelcana xena | Sp. nov | Valid | Schall & Husemann | Cretaceous | Hkamti amber or Kachin amber | Myanmar | A member of the family Elcanidae. | |
| Probaisselcana venusta | Sp. nov | | Xu et al. | Cretaceous (Albian-Cenomanian) | Kachin amber | Myanmar | A member of the family Elcanidae. | |
| Protomogoplistes ciliatus | Sp. nov | Valid | Yuan, Ma & Gu in Yuan et al. | Late Cretaceous (Cenomanian) | Kachin amber | Myanmar | A member of the family Mogoplistidae. | |
| Protomogoplistes zhouzixuanae | Sp. nov | Valid | Hu, Chen, Zhuo & He in Hu et al. | Late Cretaceous (Cenomanian) | Kachin amber | Myanmar | A member of the family Mogoplistidae. The type species is D. shiruolinae. | |
| Pseudoacrida eumastacoimima | Sp. nov | Valid | Schall et al. | Early Cretaceous | Crato Formation | Brazil | A member of the family Locustopsidae. | |
| Pseudopanorpidium inversa | Sp. nov | Valid | Schall, Kotthoff & Husemann | Cretaceous | Hkamti amber or Kachin amber | Myanmar | A member of the family Elcanidae. | |
| Qiongqi multispurous | Sp. nov | Valid | Ji et al. | Cretaceous | Kachin amber | Myanmar | A member of the family Trigonidiidae. | |
| Sinagryllus huangi | Sp. nov | Valid | Xu et al. | Middle Jurassic | Yanan Formation | China | A member of the family Baissogryllidae. First online in 2025, officially published in 2026. | |
| Thagyaminana | Gen. et sp. nov | Valid | Schall, Kotthoff & Husemann | Cretaceous | Hkamti amber or Kachin amber | Myanmar | A member of the family Elcanidae. The type species is T. atawedeia. | |

==== Orthopteran research ====
- Gu et al. (2026) reconstruct acoustic signals produced by haglid and prophalangopsid ensiferans from the Jurassic strata of the Jiulongshan Formation (China), reporting evidene of a broad range of frequencies produced by the studied insects, likely including ultrasonic frequencies.
- Schall, Kotthoff & Husemann (2026) revise Letoelcana artemisapollonque and Trigonelca jennywinterae, confirming them to be valid taxa, and interpret Paraxelcana coronakanthodis as a junior synonym of Adelphellca zhengi, resulting in a new combination Paraxelcana zhengi.
- Nunes & Carvalho (2026) study the morphology and taphonomy of elcanid fossils from the Lower Cretaceous Crato Formation (Brazil), interpret the studied insects as living close to the lake margins, and report possible evidence of camouflage in the studied specimens.

== Clade Coleopterida ==
=== Coleopterans ===
==== Adephaga ====
| Name | Novelty | Status | Authors | Age | Type locality | Country | Notes | Images |
|---|---|---|---|---|---|---|---|---|
| Archaeodyschirius | Gen. et sp. nov | Valid | Molino-Olmedo | Cretaceous | | Myanmar | A ground beetle belonging to the subfamily Scaritinae and the tribe Dyschiriini. The type species is A. misiae. Published online in 2026, but the issue date is listed as December 2025. | |
| Coptoclava spinosa | Sp. nov | Valid | Lee, Nel & Nam | Early Cretaceous (Albian) | Jinju Formation | South Korea | A member of the family Coptoclavidae. | |
| Cretoscarites | Gen. et sp. nov | | Hsiao & Beutel | Cretaceous | Kachin amber | Myanmar | A ground beetle belonging to the subfamily Scaritinae and the tribe Scaritini. The type species is C. burmanicus. | |
| Cydonius | Gen. et sp. nov | Valid | Ferreira & Quéinnec in Ferreira et al. | Cretaceous (Albian to Cenomanian) | Charentese amber | France | A ground beetle belonging to the subfamily Trechinae. The type species is C. musei. | |
| Hujia gongi | Sp. nov | Valid | Xia et al. | Cretaceous | Kachin amber | Myanmar | A tiger beetle. | |
| Ingentimandibula | Gen. et sp. nov | Valid | Huang et al. | Mid-Cretaceous | Kachin amber | Myanmar | A tiger beetle. Genus includes new species I. kachinensis. | |
| Pronotocindis | Gen. et sp. nov | Valid | Huang & Song | Mid-Cretaceous | Kachin amber | Myanmar | A tiger beetle. Genus includes new species P. liui. | |

==== Archostemata ====
| Name | Novelty | Status | Authors | Age | Type locality | Country | Notes | Images |
|---|---|---|---|---|---|---|---|---|
| Cratocupes | Fam. et gen. et sp. nov | Valid | Biffi, Lepeco & Beutel | Early Cretaceous (Aptian) | Crato Formation | Brazil | The type genus of the new family Cratocupedidae. The type species is C. scabrosus. | |
| Notocupes cratoensis | Sp. nov | Valid | Biffi, Lepeco & Beutel | Early Cretaceous (Aptian) | Crato Formation | Brazil | A member of Archostemata of uncertain affinities. | |
| Rotunthorax | Gen. et sp. nov | Valid | Gui et al. | Triassic | Tanzhuang Formation | China | A member of the family Cupedidae. The type species is R. jiyuanensis. | |
| Tetraphalerus vetustus | Sp. nov | Valid | Biffi, Lepeco & Beutel | Early Cretaceous (Aptian) | Crato Formation | Brazil | A member of the family Ommatidae. | |

==== Polyphaga ====
===== Bostrichiformia =====
| Name | Novelty | Status | Authors | Age | Type locality | Country | Notes | Images |
|---|---|---|---|---|---|---|---|---|
| Domiropsis | Gen. et sp. nov | Valid | Háva | Eocene to Miocene | Dominican amber | Dominican Republic | A member of the family Bostrichidae. The type species is D. ambericus. | |
| Ernobius myanmaricus | Sp. nov | Valid | Háva & Zahradník | Late Cretaceous (Cenomanian) | Kachin amber | Myanmar | A species of Ernobius. | |
| Hirtulus | Gen. et sp. nov | Valid | Háva & Zahradník | Eocene | Baltic amber | Russia (Kaliningrad Oblast) | A member of the family Ptinidae belonging to the subfamily Dryophilinae. The type species is H. depressus. | |
| Imaginedraconium | Gen. et sp. nov | | Ferreira et al. | Eocene | Oise amber | France | A member of the family Ptinidae belonging to the subfamily Dorcatominae. Genus includes new species I. daemon. | |
| Poinarinius connexus | Sp. nov | Valid | Lin et al. | Cretaceous | Kachin amber | Myanmar | A member of the family Bostrichidae. | |
| Poinarinius zhubajie | Sp. nov | Valid | Lin et al. | Cretaceous | Kachin amber | Myanmar | A member of the family Bostrichidae. | |
| Ptinus (Gynopterus) alekseevi | Sp. nov | Valid | Legalov & Perkovsky | Eocene | Danish amber | Denmark | | |
| Stephanopachys groehni | Sp. nov | Valid | Bukejs, Alekseev & Háva | Eocene | Rovno amber | Ukraine | A member of the family Bostrichidae. | |
| Sucinoptinus havai | Sp. nov | Valid | Legalov & Perkovsky | Eocene | Rovno amber | Ukraine | | |
| Trinodes bohri | Sp. nov | Valid | Perkovsky Háva, & Legalov | Eocene | Danish amber | Denmark | | |

===== Cucujiformia =====
| Name | Novelty | Status | Authors | Age | Type locality | Country | Notes | Images |
|---|---|---|---|---|---|---|---|---|
| Allostrophus tui | Sp. nov | Valid | Hsiao | Late Cretaceous (Cenomanian) | Kachin amber | Myanmar | A member of the family Tetratomidae. | |
| Aploceble majeri | Sp. nov | Valid | Tshernyshev et al. | Eocene | Baltic amber | Europe (Baltic Sea region) | A member of Rhadalinae. | |
| Aploceble rasnitsyni | Sp. nov | Valid | Tshernyshev et al. | Eocene | Baltic amber | Europe (Baltic Sea region) | A member of Rhadalinae. | |
| Atomaria (Anchicera) rasnitsyni | Sp. nov | Valid | Lyubarsky & Perkovsky in Lyubarsky et al. | Eocene | Baltic amber | Russia (Kaliningrad Oblast) | | |
| Boninorhinus | Gen.et sp. nov | Valid | Legalov | Cretaceous | | Myanmar | A member of the family Nemonychidae belonging to the subfamily Rhinorhynchinae and the tribe Burmomaceratini. Genus includes new species B. longirostris. | |
| Cambaltica patra | Sp. nov | | Agnihotri et al. | Eocene | Kutch amber | India | A leaf beetle. | |
| Cnopus twentyonepilotorum | Sp. nov | Valid | Ferreira & Nel in Ferreira et al. | Eocene | Oise amber | France | | |
| Elateroides helmi | Sp. nov | Valid | Holighaus in van de Peppel et al. | Eocene | Baltic amber | Europe (Baltic Sea region) | A ship-timber beetle. | |
| Furcalabratum pollinitaferum | Sp. nov | Valid | Zhao et al. | Cretaceous (Albian-Cenomanian) | Kachin amber | Myanmar | A member of the family Kateretidae. | |
| Ischalia martynovichi | Sp. nov | Valid | Alekseev | Eocene | Baltic amber | Russia (Kaliningrad Oblast) | A member of the family Prostomidae. | |
| Istrisia orienthafniae | Sp. nov | Valid | Telnov & Perkovsky | Eocene | Danish amber | Denmark | A member of the family Salpingidae. | |
| Juramychus | Gen. et sp. nov | Valid | Háva | Jurassic (Callovian-Oxfordian) | Jiulongshan Formation | China | A member of the family Endomychidae. The type species is J. daohugouensis | |
| Mysteriohelota | Gen.et sp. nov | Valid | Hsiao | Late Cretaceous (Cenomanian) | Kachin amber | Myanmar | A member of the family Helotidae. Genus includes new species M. metallicus. | |
| Neoptarthrus | Gen. et sp. nov | Valid | Legalov & Brown | Late Cretaceous (Cenomanian) | | Myanmar | A member of the family Nemonychidae belonging to the subfamily Brenthorrhininae. Genus includes new species N. rasnitsyni. | |
| Parandrexis baii | Sp. nov | Valid | Pan in Pan et al. | Middle Jurassic | Haifanggou Formation | China | | |
| Philothermus nirvanicus | Sp. nov | Valid | Alekseev & Bukejs | Eocene | Baltic amber | Russia (Kaliningrad Oblast) | | |
| Prostomis crocodylina | Sp. nov | Valid | Alekseev | Eocene | Baltic amber | Russia (Kaliningrad Oblast) | A member of the family Prostomidae. | |
| Protokateretes ensifer | Sp. nov | | Zhao, Engel & Cai in Zhao et al. | Cretaceous | | Myanmar | A member of the family Kateretidae. | |
| Rhyzobius belgicus | Sp. nov | Valid | Robin et al. | Eocene | Belgian amber | Belgium | A member of the family Coccinellidae. | |
| Ripidius paleoslavicus | Sp. nov | Valid | Perkovsky & Telnov | Eocene | Rovno amber | Ukraine | | |
| Serratopogonocerus | Gen. et sp. nov | Valid | Telnov & Perkovsky | Eocene | Baltic amber | Russia (Kaliningrad Oblast) | A fire-coloured beetle. The type species is S. succinius. | |
| Sora danica | Sp. nov | Valid | Telnov & Perkovsky | Eocene | Danish amber | Denmark | A darkling beetle. | |
| Stereopalpus succinorepertus | Sp. nov | Valid | Telnov & Alekseev | Eocene | Baltic amber | Russia (Kaliningrad Oblast) | A member of the family Anthicidae. | |
| Tremembasis | Nom. nov | | Saxton, Schnepp & Powell | Oligocene | Tremembé Formation | Brazil | A member of the family Meloidae; a replacement name for Microbasis Martins-Neto (1998). | |

===== Elateriformia =====
| Name | Novelty | Status | Authors | Age | Type locality | Country | Notes | Images |
|---|---|---|---|---|---|---|---|---|
| Adelothyreus micros | Sp. nov | Valid | Otto | Miocene | Dominican amber | Dominican Republic | | |
| Burmoluciola | Gen. et sp. nov | Valid | Zhao et al. | Mid-Cretaceous | Kachin amber | Myanmar | A firefly. Genus includes new species B. lesleyae. | |
| Cantharis navka | Sp. nov | Valid | Kazantsev & Perkovsky in Kazantsev, Legalov & Perkovsky | Eocene | Rovno amber | Ukraine | A species of Cantharis. | |
| Chalcophora eocenica | Sp. nov | Valid | Zeiri, Zorzin & Nel | Eocene | Monte Bolca | Italy | A member of the family Buprestidae. | |
| Cretoluciola | Gen. et sp. nov | Valid | Yang & Yuan in Yuan et al. | Late Cretaceous (Cenomanian) | Kachin amber | Myanmar | A firefly. The type species is C. birmana. | |
| Eocontosceles | Gen. et sp. nov | Valid | Li et al. | Mid-Cretaceous (Albian-Cenomanian) | Kachin amber | Myanmar | A member of the family Limnichidae. The type species is E. pollocki. | |
| Icaroramus | Gen. et sp. nov | Valid | Li, Kundrata & Cai in Li et al. | Cretaceous (Albian to Cenomanian) | Kachin amber | Myanmar | A member of Elateroidea possibly belonging to the family Cretophengodidae. The type species is I. perisi. | |
| Leiocerophytum | Gen. et sp. nov | Valid | Li et al. | Mid-Cretaceous | Kachin amber | Myanmar | A member of the family Cerophytidae. Genus includes new species L. biffii. | |
| Malthinus manukyani | Sp. nov | Valid | Kazantsev & Perkovsky | Eocene | Rovno amber | Ukraine | A soldier beetle, a species of Malthinus. | |
| Mastogenius aquilonaris | Sp. nov | Valid | Tamadera & Yamamoto | Eocene | Baltic amber | Russia (Kaliningrad Oblast) | A member of the family Buprestidae. | |
| Nematodes breviangularis | Sp. nov | Valid | Otto | Miocene | Dominican amber | Dominican Republic | | |
| Otho epicranus | Comb. nov | Valid | (Poinar) | Miocene | Dominican amber | Dominican Republic | Moved from Lissantauga epicrana Poinar (2013). | |
| Pagodocerus | Gen. et sp. nov | Valid | Li, Huang & Cai | Cretaceous (Albian-Cenomanian) | Kachin amber | Myanmar | A member of Dryopoidea belonging to the family Mastigocoleidae. The type species is P. volkovitshi. | |
| Paleophengodes | Gen. et sp. nov | | Zhao, Shih & Ren | Cretaceous | | Myanmar | A member of the family Cretophengodidae. Genus includes new species P. longitarsus. | |
| Phaenaxia | Gen. et sp. nov | Valid | Kwast, Alekseev & Bukejs | Eocene | Baltic amber | Europe (Baltic Sea region) | A member of the family Buprestidae. Genus includes new species P. amonbadei. | |
| Phlegon femoralis | Sp. nov | Valid | Otto | Miocene | Dominican amber | Dominican Republic | | |
| Protophengodes | Gen. et sp. nov | | Zhao, Shih & Ren | Cretaceous | | Myanmar | A member of the family Cretophengodidae. Genus includes new species P. elongatus. | |
| Sanaungulus orientalis | Sp. nov | Valid | Fanti & Háva | Late Cretaceous (Cenomanian) | Kachin amber | Myanmar | A soldier beetle. | |

===== Scarabaeiformia =====
| Name | Novelty | Status | Authors | Age | Type locality | Country | Notes | Images |
|---|---|---|---|---|---|---|---|---|
| Ceruchus zuobangi | Sp. nov | Valid | Yuan | Eocene | Baltic amber | Russia (Kaliningrad Oblast) | A species of Ceruchus. | |
| Electroaenigma | Gen. et sp. nov | Valid | Yamamoto | Cretaceous (Albian-Cenomanian) | Kachin amber | Myanmar | A stag beetle. The type species is E. chenyangi. | |
| Kachinolucanus | Gen. et sp. nov | Valid | Yamamoto | Cretaceous (Albian-Cenomanian) | Kachin amber | Myanmar | A stag beetle. The type species is K. yandai. | |
| Nesosisyphus draco | Sp. nov | Valid | Losacco et al. | Holocene | | Mauritius | A species of Nesosisyphus. | |
| Oncelytris ellipticus | Sp. nov | Valid | Yamamoto | Cretaceous (Albian-Cenomanian) | Kachin amber | Myanmar | A stag beetle. | |
| Pleistoaphodius | Gen. et sp. nov | Valid | Tello & Mondaca | Pleistocene | | Chile | A member of the family Scarabaeidae belonging to the subfamily Aphodiinae. Genus includes new species P. mariopinoi. | |

===== Staphyliniformia =====
| Name | Novelty | Status | Authors | Age | Type locality | Country | Notes | Images |
|---|---|---|---|---|---|---|---|---|
| Achenomorphus balticus | Sp. nov | Valid | Bogri et al. | Eocene | Baltic amber | Europe (Baltic Sea region) | | |
| Astenus problematicus | Sp. nov | Valid | Bogri et al. | Eocene | Baltic amber | Europe (Baltic Sea region) | | |
| Baricax | Gen. et sp. nov | Valid | Gerke, Yamamoto & Żyła | Eocene | Baltic amber | Europe (Baltic Sea region) | A rove beetle belonging to the subfamily Paederinae, the tribe Paederini and the subtribe Dicaxina. Genus includes new species B. saulana. | |
| Clidicus europaeus | Sp. nov | Valid | Jałoszyński, Perreau & Yamamoto | Eocene (Priabonian) | Baltic amber | Europe (Baltic Sea region) | A species of Clidicus. | |
| Colon proculnegotiis | Sp. nov | Valid | Alekseev & Bukejs | Eocene | Baltic amber | Europe (Baltic Sea region) | A species of Colon. | |
| Cretobius | Gen. et sp. nov | Valid | Gerke, Yamamoto & Żyła | Cretaceous (Albian-Cenomanian) | Kachin amber | Myanmar | A rove beetle belonging to the subfamily Paederinae. The type species is C. fangornis. | |
| Eusphalerum kolyada | Sp. nov | Valid | Shavrin & Perkovsky | Eocene | Rovno amber | Ukraine | | |
| Eusphalerum saule | Sp. nov | Valid | Shavrin & Perkovsky | Eocene | Baltic amber | Latvia | | |
| Homaeotarsus damgaardi | Sp. nov | Valid | Bogri et al. | Eocene | Baltic amber | Europe (Baltic Sea region) | | |
| Lathrobium arcanum | Sp. nov | Valid | Bogri et al. | Eocene | Baltic amber | Europe (Baltic Sea region) | | |
| Lathrobium athanasii | Sp. nov | Valid | Bogri et al. | Eocene | Baltic amber | Europe (Baltic Sea region) | | |
| Lathrobium rovnensis | Sp. nov | Valid | Bogri et al. | Eocene | Rovno amber | Ukraine | | |
| Menatomium | Gen. et comb. nov | Valid | Jenkins Shaw, Hansen & Solodovnikov | Paleocene | | France | A rove beetle belonging to the subfamily Oxytelinae. Genus includes "Oxyporus" impressus Piton (1940). | |
| Nazeris nikitasi | Sp. nov | Valid | Bogri et al. | Eocene | Baltic amber | Denmark | | |
| Pseudolathra baltica | Sp. nov | Valid | Bogri et al. | Eocene | Baltic amber | Denmark | | |
| Sclerochiton hoffeinsorum | Sp. nov | Valid | Bogri et al. | Eocene | Baltic amber | Europe (Baltic Sea region) | | |

===== Other Polyphaga =====
| Name | Novelty | Status | Authors | Age | Type locality | Country | Notes | Images |
|---|---|---|---|---|---|---|---|---|
| Tibianosodendron | Gen. et sp. nov | Valid | Háva | Late Cretaceous (Cenomanian) | Kachin amber | Myanmar | A member of the family Nosodendridae. The type species is T. nigrum. | |

==== Coleopteran research ====
- Liu et al. (2026) report the discovery of a specialized Pachyteles-like beetle larva from the Cretaceous amber from Myanmar, with a morphology interpreted by the authors as suggestive of adaptations to ambush predation strategy and to phragmotic defense.
- Evidence from the study of the fossil record of Dytiscidae, indicative of Late Triassic or Early Jurassic origin of the family, is presented by Ferreira et al. (2026).
- Linhart et al. (2026) provide new information on the mouthpart morphology of Partisaniferus edjarzembowskii, and interpret members of the genus Partisaniferus as likely to be larvae of elateroid beetles with affinities with the families Jurasaidae and Cerophytidae.
- Linhart et al. (2026) describe 45 new specimens of soldier beetle larvae from the Cretaceous amber from Myanmar and from the Eocene Baltic amber, and find no evidence of a significant loss of morphological diversity of larvae of members of this group throughout its evolutionary history.
- Haug et al. (2026) identify a new morphotype of click beetle larvae from the Cretaceous amber from amber, characterized by long setae on its body.
- Li et al. (2026) revise the affinities of Angimordella burmitina, interpreting it as more likely to be a member of Apotomourinae than a relative of extant pollen-feeding specialists from the subfamily Mordellinae, and interpret its interactions with contemporaneous flowering plants as more likely to be occasional rather than obligate.
- Ferreira et al. (2026) provide new divergence time estimates for bark beetles, and find that different dating methodologies all indicate that the group diversified before the Cretaceous Terrestrial Revolution.
- Rosas et al. (2026) report the discovery of a diverse assemblage of beetle fossils of probable Neogene age from a new site near the town of Penrose in the Southern Highlands (New South Wales, Australia).

== Dermapterans ==
| Name | Novelty | Status | Authors | Age | Type locality | Country | Notes | Images |
|---|---|---|---|---|---|---|---|---|
| Carbolytron | Gen. et sp. nov | Valid | Peng et al. | Carboniferous (Moscovian) | | France | A member of the stem group of Dermaptera. Genus includes new species C. oudardi. | |

== Clade Dictyoptera ==
| Name | Novelty | Status | Authors | Age | Type locality | Country | Notes | Images |
|---|---|---|---|---|---|---|---|---|
| Anthracoblattina macucai | Sp. nov | Valid | Lara & Cariglino | Permian (Cisuralian) | Arroyo Totoral Formation | Argentina | A member of the family Phyloblattidae. | |
| Cultriblatta | Gen. et 2 sp. nov | Valid | Liang et al. | Early Cretaceous (Barremian) | Yixian Formation | China | A member of the family Raphidiomimidae. The type species is C. yanyue; genus also includes new species C. zhisheng. | |
| Cupidoblatta | Gen. et sp. nov | | Sendi et al. | Mid-Cretaceous | Kachin amber | Myanmar | A cockroach belonging to the family Corydiidae. Genus includes new species C. elegans. | |
| Diploptera praecisus | Sp. nov | Valid | Archibald et al. | Eocene; Ypresian | Eocene Okanagan Highlands; Coldwater Beds | Canada; British Columbia | A beetle cockroach species. Also reported in the Klondike Mountain Formation, Washington, USA | |
| Diploptera reticulata | Sp. nov | Valid | Archibald et al. | Eocene | Messel Pit | Germany | A beetle cockroach species. | |
| Diploptera rothi | Sp. nov | Valid | Archibald et al. | Eocene; Ypresian | Eocene Okanagan Highlands; McAbee Fossil Beds | Canada (British Columbia) | A beetle cockroach species. | |
| Diploptera simeoptera | Sp. nov | Valid | Archibald et al. | Eocene; Ypresian | Eocene Okanagan Highlands; Klondike Mountain Formation | United States; Washington | A beetle cockroach species. | |
| Ectobius antiquus | Sp. nov | | Hinkelman in Hinkelman & Li | Late Cretaceous (Santonian–Campanian) | Nenjiang Formation | China | | |
| Elisama gwanghyeoni | sp. nov | | Nam & Jang | Early Cretaceous (Albian) | Jinju Formation | South Korea | A cockroach belonging to the family Blattulidae. | |
| Elongatoblatta | Gen. et sp. nov | | Nam & Jang | Early Cretaceous (Albian) | Jinju Formation | South Korea | A cockroach belonging to the family Raphidiomimidae. Genus includes new species E. minsuki. | |
| Eunyctibora stigmata | Sp. nov | | Hinkelman in Hinkelman & Li | Late Cretaceous (Santonian–Campanian) | Nenjiang Formation | China | | |
| Folimantis | Fam. et gen. et sp. nov | Valid | Yang et al. | Mid-Cretaceous | Kachin amber | Myanmar | A mantis preserving evidence of mimicry of leaves of Selaginella; the type genus of the new family Folimantidae. Genus includes new species F. hyalinala. | |
| Habroblattula superposita | sp. nov | | Wang et al. | Early Cretaceous | Shuinan Formation | China | A member of the family Blattulidae. | |
| Holocompsa hamatospina | Sp. nov | | Malem & Jouault in Malem et al. | Eocene | Baltic amber | Europe (Baltic Sea region) | A member of the family Corydiidae. | |
| Latiblattella parallela | Sp. nov | | Hinkelman in Hinkelman & Li | Late Cretaceous (Santonian–Campanian) | Nenjiang Formation | China | | |
| Neoblattella punctata | Sp. nov | | Hinkelman in Hinkelman & Li | Late Cretaceous (Santonian–Campanian) | Nenjiang Formation | China | | |
| Nigropterix sinensis | Sp. nov | | Hinkelman in Hinkelman & Li | Late Cretaceous (Santonian–Campanian) | Nenjiang Formation | China | | |
| Ovaliblatta | Gen. et sp. nov | Valid | Aiba & Oyama | Late Cretaceous (Coniacian) | Tamayama Formation | Japan | Probably a member of the family Ectobiidae. The type species is O. iwakiensis. | |
| Perlucipecta jedlickai | Sp. nov | Valid | Hinkelman | Cretaceous | | Myanmar | | |
| Phoetalia eocenica | sp. nov | Valid | Vršanský, Šmídová & Vidlička | Eocene | Green River Formation | United States (Colorado) | A blaberid cockroach. | |
| Pinniblatta | Gen. et 2 sp. nov | | Sendi et al. | Mid-Cretaceous | Kachin amber | Myanmar | A cockroach belonging to the family Corydiidae. Genus includes new species P. sylvana and P. horvathovae. | |
| Praeblattella aliciae | Sp. nov | Valid | Hinkelman | Mid-Cretaceous | Kachin amber | Myanmar | A member of the family Mesoblattinidae. | |
| Praeblattella vila | Sp. nov | | Hinkelman in Hinkelman & Li | Late Cretaceous (Santonian–Campanian) | Nenjiang Formation | China | | |
| Stictolampra vetustasia | Sp. nov | | Hinkelman in Hinkelman & Li | Late Cretaceous (Santonian–Campanian) | Nenjiang Formation | China | | |
| Vrtula gwanghyeonensis | sp. nov | | Nam & Jang | Early Cretaceous (Albian) | Jinju Formation | South Korea | A cockroach belonging to the family Blattulidae | |
| Weiblatta | Gen. et sp. nov | | Fu, Su & Luo in Fu et al. | Late Cretaceous (Santonian–Campanian) | Nenjiang Formation | China | A blaberid cockroach. The type species is W. hinkelmani. | |

=== Dictyopteran research ===
- Ianni et al. (2026) report the discovery of a hindwing of a roachoid belonging to the family Spiloblattinidae from the Carboniferous (Moscovian) strata of the San Giorgio Basin, representing the first fossil insect formally described from Sardinia and the oldest insect fossil from Italy reported to date.
- Nel, Garrouste & Loll (2026) describe new fossil material of pan-dictyopterans ("roachoids") from the Carboniferous strata from the Reyran Basin (France), including a forewing of a member of the genus Anthracoblattina distinct from A. ensifer cf. desguini reported from the same area, as well as the first record of a member of Archimylacridae from the studied area.
- Redescription of the anatomy of Archimylacris acadica, based on data from a new specimen from the Carboniferous (Moscovian) Sunbury Creek Formation (New Brunswick, Canada), is published by Schneider et al. (2026).
- Rea, Simpson & Wizevich (2026) study a sample of the ichnofossil Eopolis ekdalei from the Brushy Basin Member of the Morrison Formation (Utah, United States) preserved with plant, insect and fungal remains interpreted as suggesting that Eopolis ekdalei was produced by termite, as well as suggestive of fungal farming by termites during the Late Jurassic.
- Vršanský et al. (2026) interpret the composition of fossil assemblages of dictyopteran insects from Russia and Australia as indicative of presence of high-latitude forests with tall tree canopies during the Cretaceous.
- Philippe et al. (2026) report the discovery of termine coprolites in a silicified driftwood piece from the Albian strata from the Valdrôme site (France), and argue that dispersal of termites might have been aided by driftwood carried by the sea as early as the Cretaceous period.
- Krejčíř et al. (2026) describe termite coprolites associated with silicified oak wood and microscopic fungal structures from the Oligocene Menilite Formation (Czech Republic), providing the first direct evidence of termite–fungus interaction in anatomically preserved Oligocene wood from Central Europe.
- Abrahams et al. (2026) describe termite nest structures from the Pleistocene strata from the Calitzdorp site (South Africa), and name a new ichnotaxon Columnanidus calitzdorpensis.

== Hymenopterans ==
=== Symphyta ===
| Name | Novelty | Status | Authors | Age | Type locality | Country | Notes | Images |
|---|---|---|---|---|---|---|---|---|
| Anoplonyx rasnitsyni | Sp. nov | Valid | Mock, Nel & Boderau | Eocene (Ypresian) | Green River Formation | United States (Colorado) | A member of the family Tenthredinidae. | |
| Cenosirex | Gen. et sp. nov | Valid | Jouault et al. | Paleocene | Paskapoo Formation | Canada (Alberta) | A horntail. Genus includes new species C. speirsorum. | |
| Cilioxyela | Gen. et sp. nov | Valid | Li & Wei in Li, Niu & Wei | Cretaceous | Kachin amber | Myanmar | A member of the family Syspastoxyelidae. The type species is C. setosa. | |
| Cretaulisca | Gen. et sp. nov | Valid | Kopylov | Early Cretaceous | | Russia (Buryatia) | A horntail. Genus includes new species C. rasnitsyni. | |
| Eotenthredo | Fam. et gen. et 2 sp. nov | | Zhuang et al. | Early Cretaceous | Yixian Formation | China | A member of Tenthredinoidea; the type genus of the new family Eotenthredinidae. Genus includes new species E. sinensis and E. magna. | |
| Platyotoma | Gen. et 2 sp. nov | | Zhuang et al. | Early Cretaceous | Yixian Formation | China | A member of the family Blasticotomidae. Genus includes new species P. elongata and P. mirabilis. | |
| Pseudoxyela crassa | Sp. nov | | Zhuang et al. | Early Cretaceous | Yixian Formation | China | A member of the family Blasticotomidae. | |
| Pseudoxyela lata | Sp. nov | | Zhuang et al. | Early Cretaceous | Yixian Formation | China | A member of the family Blasticotomidae. | |
| Scleroxyela curva | Sp. nov | Valid | Zheng et al. | Middle Jurassic | Daohugou Beds | China | A member of the family Xyelidae. | |
| Uroxyela rasnitsyni | Sp. nov | Valid | Zheng et al. | Middle Jurassic | Daohugou Beds | China | A member of the family Xyelidae. | |

=== Apocrita ===
==== Apoidea ====
| Name | Novelty | Status | Authors | Age | Type locality | Country | Notes | Images |
|---|---|---|---|---|---|---|---|---|
| Apis antejaponica | Sp. nov | Valid | Engel & Tanaka | Pliocene | Kabutoiwa Formation | Japan | A honey bee. | |
| Osmia basaltica | Comb. nov | Valid | (Zhang) | Miocene | | China | A mason bee; moved from "Dasypoda" basaltica Zhang (1989). | |
| Osmia kabutoiwica | Sp. nov | Valid | Engel & Tanaka | Pliocene | Kabutoiwa Formation | Japan | A mason bee. | |
| Probombus nelorum | Sp. nov | | Engel in Geier et al. | Paleocene | | France | A megachiline bee belonging to the tribe Ctenoplectrellini. | |
| Protolithurgus acarophorus | Sp. nov | Valid | Woodrow et al. | Eocene | Baltic amber | Europe (Baltic Sea region) | A member of the family Megachilidae belonging to the subfamily Lithurginae. | |
| Tithonanthidium | Gen. et sp. nov | | Engel in Geier et al. | Paleocene | | France | A megachiline bee, possibly a member of the tribe Anthidiini. Genus includes new species T. menatense. | |

===== Apoid research =====
- A study on the morphology and phylogenetic relationships of extant stingless bees, Proplebeia dominicana and the tribe Melikertini is published by Lepeco & Almeida (2026).

==== Ceraphronoidea ====
| Name | Novelty | Status | Authors | Age | Type locality | Country | Notes | Images |
|---|---|---|---|---|---|---|---|---|
| Alphaspilus | Gen. et sp. nov | Valid | Álvarez-Parra, Azar & Engel | Early Cretaceous | Lebanese amber | Lebanon | A member of the family Megaspilidae. Genus includes new species A. heliades. | |
| Lelejaphron | Gen. et sp. nov | Valid | Rasnitsyn & Kopylov | Early Cretaceous | | Russia (Buryatia) | A member of the family Radiophronidae. The type species is L. arkadii. | |
| Spinigaster | Gen. et sp. nov | Valid | Alekseev & Chemyreva | Mid-Cretaceous (Albian-Cenomanian) | Kachin amber | Myanmar | A member of the family Megaspilidae. The type species is S. rasnitsyni. | |

==== Chalcidoidea ====
| Name | Novelty | Status | Authors | Age | Type locality | Country | Notes | Images |
|---|---|---|---|---|---|---|---|---|
| Australomymar losinnoense | Sp. nov | Valid | Pawluk | Eocene | Baltic amber | Poland | A fairyfly. | |
| Coriotela rasnitsyni | Sp. nov | Valid | Tselikh & Mitroiu in Tselikh et al. | Eocene | Baltic amber | Russia (Kaliningrad Oblast) | | |
| Paleolelaps | Gen. et sp. nov | Valid | Tselikh & Rasplus in Tselikh et al. | Eocene | Baltic amber | Europe (Baltic Sea region) | A member of the family Diparidae. Genus includes new species P. draco. | |

==== Chrysidoidea ====
| Name | Novelty | Status | Authors | Age | Type locality | Country | Notes | Images |
|---|---|---|---|---|---|---|---|---|
| Chaetochrysis | Fan. et gen. et 3 sp. nov | | Wu et al. | Cretaceous | Kachin amber | Myanmar | The type genus of the new family Chaetochrysididae close to the base of Chrysidoidea. Genus includes new species C. cordata C. complanata and C. aptera. | |
| Chlorepyris mesocurvus | Sp. nov | | Jouault, Huang & Azevedo | Cretaceous (Albian-Cenomanian) | Kachin amber | Myanmar | A member of the family Bethylidae belonging to the subfamily Epyrinae. | |
| Chlorepyris norahae | Sp. nov | | Brazidec | Miocene | Zhangpu amber | China | | |
| Gracilepyris carsteni | Sp. nov | Valid | Brazidec, Aupérin & Perrichot | Eocene | Baltic amber | Russia (Kaliningrad Oblast) | A member of the family Bethylidae belonging to the subfamily Epyrinae. | |
| Gwesped piastrii | Sp. nov | | Jouault, Huang & Azevedo | Cretaceous (Albian-Cenomanian) | Kachin amber | Myanmar | A member of the family Bethylidae belonging to the subfamily Lancepyrinae. | |
| Nothepyris bardeti | Sp. nov | Valid | Brazidec | Eocene | Oise amber | France | A member of the family Bethylidae belonging to the subfamily Scleroderminae. | |
| Oesiepyris | Gen. et sp. nov | Valid | Brazidec | Eocene | Oise amber | France | A member of the family Bethylidae belonging to the subfamily Epyrinae. Genus includes new species O. alaphilippei. | |
| Risepyris bruesi | Nom. nov | Valid | Brazidec in Brazidec, Aupérin & Perrichot | Eocene | Baltic amber | Russia (Kaliningrad Oblast) | A member of the family Bethylidae belonging to the subfamily Epyrinae; a replacement name for Misepyris dubius Brues (1933). | |

==== Diaprioidea ====
| Name | Novelty | Status | Authors | Age | Type locality | Country | Notes | Images |
|---|---|---|---|---|---|---|---|---|
| Chimeracinus | Gen. et sp. nov | Valid | Chemyreva & Öhm-Kühnle | Mid-Cretaceous (Albian-Cenomanian) | Kachin amber | Myanmar | A member of the family Diapriidae. Genus includes new species C. rasnitsyni. | |
| Eodiapria | Gen. et sp. nov | Valid | Xie et al. | Eocene | Fushun amber | China | A member of the family Diapriidae. Genus includes new species E. rasnitsyni. | |
| Spathiopteryx ferrandprevotae | Sp. nov | Valid | Brazidec & Perrichot | Cretaceous (Albian-Cenomanian) | Charentese amber | France | | |

==== Dryinoidea ====
| Name | Novelty | Status | Authors | Age | Type locality | Country | Notes | Images |
|---|---|---|---|---|---|---|---|---|
| Ampulicomorpha kachinensis | Sp. nov | | Guillam, Chény, Zhang & Perrichot in Guillam et al. | Late Cretaceous (Cenomanian) | Kachin amber | Myanmar | A member of the family Embolemidae. | |
| Ampulicomorpha resinata | Sp. nov | | Chény, Guillam, Brazidec & Zhang in Guillam et al. | Late Cretaceous (Cenomanian) | Kachin amber | Myanmar | A member of the family Embolemidae. | |
| Ampulicomorpha sakrai | Sp. nov | | Guillam, Chény, Zhang & Perrichot in Guillam et al. | Late Cretaceous (Cenomanian) | Kachin amber | Myanmar | A member of the family Embolemidae. | |
| Embolemus asrii | Sp. nov | | Brazidec, Guillam, Chény & Perrichot in Guillam et al. | Late Cretaceous (Cenomanian) | Kachin amber | Myanmar | A member of the family Embolemidae. | |
| Embolemus mulleri | Sp. nov | | Guillam, Chény, Zhang & Perrichot in Guillam et al. | Late Cretaceous (Cenomanian) | Kachin amber | Myanmar | A member of the family Embolemidae. | |

==== Evanioidea ====
| Name | Novelty | Status | Authors | Age | Type locality | Country | Notes | Images |
|---|---|---|---|---|---|---|---|---|
| Antevania | Fam. et gen. et sp. nov | Valid | Engel & Peretti | Cretaceous | Kachin amber | Myanmar | The type genus of the new family Antevaniidae. The type species is A. hirsuta. | |
| Tichostephanus qinshubao | Sp. nov | Valid | Ge & Tan in Ge, Ren & Tan | Cretaceous | Kachin amber | Myanmar | A member of the family Gasteruptiidae. | |
| Tichostephanus yuchijingde | Sp. nov | Valid | Ge & Tan in Ge, Ren & Tan | Cretaceous | Kachin amber | Myanmar | A member of the family Gasteruptiidae. | |
| Vectevania rovno | Sp. nov | Valid | Rasnitsyn & Perkovsky | Eocene | Rovno amber | Ukraine | A member of Aulacinae. | |

==== Formicoidea ====
| Name | Novelty | Status | Authors | Age | Type locality | Country | Notes | Images |
|---|---|---|---|---|---|---|---|---|
| Acromyrmex yucayequensis | Sp. nov | Valid | Mera-Rodríguez, Sosa-Calvo, Fiorentino, Barden & Schultz in Fiorentino et al. | Miocene | Dominican amber | Dominican Republic | | |
| Allomerus bi | Sp. nov | Valid | Fiorentino, Barden & Fernández in Fiorentino et al. | Miocene | Dominican amber | Dominican Republic | | |
| Brachymyrmex atrapada | Sp. nov | Valid | Fernandez, Sosa, Fiorentino, Barden & Probst in Fiorentino et al. | Miocene | Dominican amber | Dominican Republic | | |
| Brachyponera mamajuanis | Sp. nov | Valid | Fiorentino, Cubillos, Fernández & Lattke in Fiorentino et al. | Miocene | Dominican amber | Dominican Republic | | |
| Camponotus matunai | Sp. nov | Valid | LaPolla, Fiorentino & Barden in Fiorentino et al. | Miocene | Dominican amber | Dominican Republic | | |
| Cardiocondyla larimar | Sp. nov | Valid | Fiorentino, Sosa, Navarro & Barden in Fiorentino et al. | Miocene | Dominican amber | Dominican Republic | | |
| Cayrapone | Gen. et sp. nov | Valid | Cubillos, Fiorentino & Lattke in Fiorentino et al. | Miocene | Dominican amber | Dominican Republic | An ant belonging to the subfamily Ponerinae. The type species is C. hupia. | |
| Chimerodous | Gen. et sp. nov | Valid | Guerrero, Barden & Fiorentino in Fiorentino et al. | Miocene | Dominican amber | Dominican Republic | An ant belonging to the subfamily Dolichoderinae. The type species is C. alpha. | |
| Crematogaster diunota | Sp. nov | Valid | Blaimer, Fiorentino & Barden in Fiorentino et al. | Miocene | Dominican amber | Dominican Republic | | |
| Eurhopalothrix electrina | Sp. nov | Valid | Probst, Barden & Fiorentino in Fiorentino et al. | Miocene | Dominican amber | Dominican Republic | | |
| Fallomyrma czechowskii | Sp. nov | Valid | Radchenko | Eocene | Probably Baltic amber | Europe (Baltic Sea region) | An ant belonging to the subfamily Myrmicinae. | |
| Fulakora lata | Sp. nov | Valid | Ladino, Lattke, Fiorentino & Barden in Fiorentino et al. | Miocene | Dominican amber | Dominican Republic | | |
| Hypoponera electrocacica | Sp. nov | Valid | Fiorentino et al. | Miocene | Dominican amber | Dominican Republic | A species of Hypoponera. | |
| Kempfidris priminatus | Sp. nov | Valid | Fiorentino, Barden, Feitosa & Fernández in Fiorentino et al. | Miocene | Dominican amber | Dominican Republic | | |
| Kiskeyapone | Gen. et sp. nov | Valid | Fiorentino, Cubillos, Barden, Fernandez & Lattke in Fiorentino et al. | Miocene | Dominican amber | Dominican Republic | An ant belonging to the subfamily Ponerinae. The type species is K. armilla. | |
| Leptogenys intacta | Sp. nov | Valid | Cubillos, Cavalcanti & Lattke in Fiorentino et al. | Miocene | Dominican amber | Dominican Republic | | |
| Mayaponera bachata | Sp. nov | Valid | Fiorentino, Cubillos, Fernández & Lattke in Fiorentino et al. | Miocene | Dominican amber | Dominican Republic | | |
| Mycetomoellerius yucahu | Sp. nov | Valid | Mera-Rodríguez, Sosa-Calvo, Fiorentino, Barden & Schultz in Fiorentino et al. | Miocene | Dominican amber | Dominican Republic | | |
| Paranillidris neotropica | Comb. nov | Valid | (Baroni Urbani) | Miocene | Dominican amber | Dominican Republic | An ant belonging to the tribe Leptomyrmecini; moved from Leptomyrmex neotropicus Baroni Urbani (1980). | |
| Paraphaenogaster tanemurai | Sp. nov | Valid | Aiba & Inose | Miocene | Fuzawa Formation | Japan | A member of the subfamily Myrmicinae and the tribe Stenammini. | |
| Paratrachymyrmex primaevus | Comb. nov | Valid | (Baroni Urbani) | Miocene | Dominican amber | Dominican Republic | Moved from Trachymyrmex primaevus Baroni Urbani (1980). | |
| Pheidole ambrata | Sp. nov | Valid | Varela Hernández | Oligo-Miocene | Mexican amber | Mexico | A species of Pheidole. | |
| Pheidole capitomagna | Sp. nov | Valid | Varela Hernández | Oligo-Miocene | Mexican amber | Mexico | A species of Pheidole. | |
| Pogonomyrmex tiempopogo | Sp. nov | Valid | Barden & Fiorentino in Fiorentino et al. | Miocene | Dominican amber | Dominican Republic | | |
| Poneracantha minima | Sp. nov | Valid | Camacho, Lattke, Barden & Fiorentino in Fiorentino et al. | Miocene | Dominican amber | Dominican Republic | | |
| Prionopelta ambigua | Sp. nov | Valid | Ladino, Lattke, Barden & Fiorentino in Fiorentino et al. | Miocene | Dominican amber | Dominican Republic | | |
| Pseudoponera hatuey | Sp. nov | Valid | Cubillos, Fernández, Lattke & Fiorentino in Fiorentino et al. | Miocene | Dominican amber | Dominican Republic | | |
| Rhopalothrix macorixia | Sp. nov | Valid | Probst, Barden & Fiorentino in Fiorentino et al. | Miocene | Dominican amber | Dominican Republic | | |
| Rogeria primaeva | Sp. nov | Valid | Feitosa, Barden & Fiorentino in Fiorentino et al. | Miocene | Dominican amber | Dominican Republic | | |
| Schismiscapus caritatis | Comb. nov | Valid | (Brandão et al.) | Miocene | Dominican amber | Dominican Republic | An ant belonging to the tribe Leptomyrmecini; moved from Technomyrmex caritatis Brandão et al. (1999). | |
| Schismiscapus hispaniolae | Comb. nov | Valid | (Wilson) | Miocene | Dominican amber | Dominican Republic | An ant belonging to the tribe Leptomyrmecini; moved from Iridomyrmex hispaniolae Wilson (1985). | |
| Siinikaponera balana | Sp. nov | Valid | Varela-Hernández & Guerrero | Oligocene-Miocene | Mexican amber | Mexico | An ant belonging to the subfamily Ponerinae. | |
| Solenopsis lamellata | Sp. nov | Valid | Bouju et al. | Miocene (Burdigalian) | Dominican amber | Dominican Republic | A fire ant. | |
| Solenopsis merengue | Sp. nov | Valid | Bouju et al. | Miocene (Burdigalian) | Dominican amber | Dominican Republic | A fire ant. | |
| Solenopsis picapica | Sp. nov | Valid | Bouju et al. | Miocene (Burdigalian) | Dominican amber | Dominican Republic | A fire ant. | |
| Solenopsis pilonaria | Sp. nov | Valid | Bouju et al. | Miocene (Burdigalian) | Dominican amber | Dominican Republic | A fire ant. | |
| Solenopsis viralata | Sp. nov | Valid | Bouju et al. | Miocene (Burdigalian) | Dominican amber | Dominican Republic | A fire ant. | |
| Stenoponera | Gen. et sp. nov | Valid | Lattke, Cubillos, Fernández & Fiorentino in Fiorentino et al. | Miocene | Dominican amber | Dominican Republic | An ant belonging to the subfamily Ponerinae. The type species is S. petiolata. | |
| Stigmatomma eocenicum | Comb. nov | Valid | (Dlussky) | Eocene | Baltic amber | Europe (Baltic Sea region) | Moved from Proceratium eocenicum Dlussky (2009). | |

===== Formicoidea research =====
- De la Fuente & Estrada-Peña (2026) report cases of inclusions of remains of ants and other organisms (other arthropods, plants and a land snail) in pieces of Dominican amber, Baltic amber and Cretaceous amber from Myanmar, providing evidence of coexistence of plants with other organisms (including possible evidence of commensalism, phoresis and parasitism) since the Cretaceous.
- Lepeco et al. (2026) reaffirm the original identification of Cariridris bipetiolata as an ant, and tentatively assign it to the subfamily Haidomyrmecinae.
- The oldest definitive fossil material of aneuretine and pseudomyrmecine ants reported to date is described from the amber from the Upper Cretaceous (Maastrichtian) strata of the Battle Formation in the Big Muddy Valley (Saskatchewan, Canada) by Loewen et al. (2026).
- Jouault, Swain & Sosiak (2026) reconstruct the evolutionary history of members of five ant subfamilies during the Cenozoic on the basis of data from extant and fossil taxa, reporting evidence of probable impact of interactions (both competition and facilitation) between members of the studied subfamilies on their evolution.
- Boudinot et al. (2026) redescribe an ant in Eocene Baltic amber from the collection of Johann Wolfgang von Goethe which was identified as specimen of Ctenobethylus C by Mayr 1868. Boudinot et al. interpret the species as a senior synonym of Eldermyrmex exsectus Dubovikoff & Dlussky, 2019, and extrapolate the ants to have been the dominant arborial ant species for Temperate coniferous Eocene forests.
- Zharkov et al. (2026) study the composition of fossil assemblages of several organisms including ants within pieces of the Eocene Baltic amber, and report evidence of distinct interaction clusters of Ctenobethylus goepperti and Lasius schiefferdeckeri, interpreted as likely linked to divergent ecological strategies of the studied ants.
- Radchenko & Ribbecke (2026) report the discovery of a probable soldier of Drymomyrmex fuscipennis from the Eocene Baltic amber, providing evidence of worker caste dimorphism in members of the genus Drymomyrmex, interpret the studied specimen as evidence of phragmotic behavior in Eocene ants, and propose to assign Drymomyrmex to the tribe Lasiini.

==== Ichneumonoidea ====
| Name | Novelty | Status | Authors | Age | Type locality | Country | Notes | Images |
|---|---|---|---|---|---|---|---|---|
| Astigmaton rasnitsyni | Sp. nov | Valid | Manukyan in Manukyan & Sinelschikova | Eocene | Baltic amber | Russia (Kaliningrad Oblast) | | |
| Xanthopimpla zherikhini | Sp. nov | Valid | Manukyan, Dubovikoff & Smirnova | Eocene | Baltic amber | Europe (Baltic Sea region) | A species of Xanthopimpla. Published online in 2026, but the issue date is listed as December 2025. | |

==== Platygastroidea ====
| Name | Novelty | Status | Authors | Age | Type locality | Country | Notes | Images |
|---|---|---|---|---|---|---|---|---|
| Crypton | Gen. et sp. nov | Valid | Talamas, Popovici, Shih & Ren in Talamas et al. | Mid-Cretaceous | Kachin amber | Myanmar | A member of the family Sparasionidae. The type species is C. cleopatrae. | |
| Fidiobia angulipennis | Comb. nov | Valid | (Brues) | Eocene | Baltic amber | Europe (Baltic Sea region) | Moved from Trachelopteron angulipenne Brues (1940) | |
| Fidiobia antiquita | Sp. nov | Valid | Talamas & Popovici in Talamas et al. | Eocene | Baltic amber | Europe (Baltic Sea region) | | |
| Fidiobia reptans | Sp. nov | Valid | Talamas, Popovici & Bremer in Talamas et al. | Eocene | Baltic amber | Europe (Baltic Sea region) | | |
| Nyleta doddi | Comb. nov | Valid | (Brues) | Eocene | Baltic amber | Europe (Baltic Sea region) | Moved from Hoploteleia doddi Brues (1940) | |
| Parabaeus collaris | Comb. nov | Valid | (Brues) | Eocene | Baltic amber | Europe (Baltic Sea region) | Moved from Aneurobaeus collaris Brues (1940) | |
| Platyscelio depressus | Comb. nov | Valid | (Brues) | Eocene | Baltic amber | Europe (Baltic Sea region) | Moved from Proplatyscelio depressus Brues (1940) | |
| Torulon | Gen. et 2 sp. nov | Valid | Talamas, Popovici, Shih & Ren in Talamas et al. | Mid-Cretaceous | Kachin amber | Myanmar | A member of the family Sparasionidae. The type species is T. elongatum; genus also includes T. croca. | |

==== Proctotrupoidea ====
| Name | Novelty | Status | Authors | Age | Type locality | Country | Notes | Images |
|---|---|---|---|---|---|---|---|---|
| Eopelecinus christophi | Sp. nov | Valid | Chemyreva & Kolyada | Mid-Cretaceous | Kachin amber | Myanmar | A member of the family Pelecinidae. | |
| Eopelecinus wangae | Nom. nov | Valid | Chemyreva & Kolyada | Mid-Cretaceous | Kachin amber | Myanmar | A member of the family Pelecinidae; a replacement name for Stelepelecinus minutus Wang, Shih & Gao. | |
| Peleciserphus | Gen. et sp. nov | Valid | Chemyreva & Kolyada | Mid-Cretaceous | Kachin amber | Myanmar | A member of the family Pelecinidae. Genus includes new species P. minaevi. | |

==== Scolioidea ====
| Name | Novelty | Status | Authors | Age | Type locality | Country | Notes | Images |
|---|---|---|---|---|---|---|---|---|
| Liaoscolia | Gen. et sp. nov | | Wei et al. | Early Cretaceous | Yixian Formation | China | A member of the family Scoliidae. Genus includes new species L. zhangi. | |
| Protoscolia obliqua | Sp. nov | | Wei et al. | Early Cretaceous | Yixian Formation | China | A member of the family Scoliidae. | |
| Scolia miocaenica | Nom. nov | Valid | Taylor | Miocene | | China | A replacement name for Scolia distincta Zhang (1989). | |

==== Stephanoidea ====
| Name | Novelty | Status | Authors | Age | Type locality | Country | Notes | Images |
|---|---|---|---|---|---|---|---|---|
| Myanmarina grandis | Sp. nov | Valid | Zheng in Wang et al. | Cretaceous (Albian-Cenomanian) | Kachin amber | Myanmar | A member of the family Myanmarinidae. | |
| Myanmarina simplex | Sp. nov | Valid | Zheng in Wang et al. | Cretaceous (Albian-Cenomanian) | Kachin amber | Myanmar | A member of the family Myanmarinidae. | |

==== Vespoidea ====
| Name | Novelty | Status | Authors | Age | Type locality | Country | Notes | Images |
|---|---|---|---|---|---|---|---|---|
| Polistes tibetensis | Sp. nov | | Xu, Carpenter & Somavilla in Xu et al. | Eocene | Niubao Formation | China | A species of Polistes. | |

===== Vespoid research =====
- Yao et al. (2026) report the discovery of nests preserved in the Cretaceous amber from Myanmar with similarities to nests of extant members of Eumenini, and interpret them as the first fossil evidence of eumenine nesting behavior reported to date; Fateryga & Mauss (2026) subsequently argue that these nests cannot be attributed to members of the tribe Eumenini, and possibly even to members of the subfamily Eumeninae.

==== Other Apocrita ====
| Name | Novelty | Status | Authors | Age | Type locality | Country | Notes | Images |
|---|---|---|---|---|---|---|---|---|
| Leptephialtites rasnitsyni | Sp. nov | Valid | Jia et al. | Middle Jurassic | Daohugou Beds | China | A member of the family Ephialtitidae. | |
| Pangu yehuii | Sp. nov | | Zhang & Rasnitsyn in Zhang et al. | Late Cretaceous (Cenomanian) | Kachin amber | Myanmar | A basal member of Aculeata belonging to the family Panguidae. | |
| Siccibythus enervius | Sp. nov | Valid | Li et al. | Late Cretaceous (Cenomanian) | Kachin amber | Myanmar | A member of the family Falsiformicidae. | |
| Sinosymphytopterus | Gen. et sp. nov | | Jia, Zhang & Zhang | Middle Jurassic | Daohugou Beds | China | A member of the family Ephialtitidae. Genus includes new species S. ningchengensis. | |
| Symphytopterus rasnitsyni | Sp. nov | | Jia, Zhang & Zhang | Middle Jurassic | Daohugou Beds | China | A member of the family Ephialtitidae. | |

== Clade Neuropterida ==
=== Neuropterans ===
| Name | Novelty | Status | Authors | Age | Type locality | Country | Notes | Images |
|---|---|---|---|---|---|---|---|---|
| Babinoleon | Gen. et sp. nov | Valid | Lu et al. | Cretaceous | Kachin amber | Myanmar | An antlion. The type species is B. jinmingae. | |
| Burmobabinskaia jiaxiaoae | Sp. nov | Valid | Lu et al. | Cretaceous | Kachin amber | Myanmar | A member of the family Babinskaiidae. | |
| Carentosymphrasites | Gen. et sp. nov | Valid | Jouault, Liu & Perrichot | Late Cretaceous (Cenomanian) | Charentese amber | France | A member of the family Mantispidae belonging to the subfamily Symphrasinae. The type species is C. zhengi. | |
| Cherasisyra | Gen. et sp. nov | Valid | Engel & Peretti | Cretaceous | Hkamti amber | Myanmar | A member of the family Sisyridae. Genus includes new species C. elegans. | |
| Coronidilar jiaxiaoae | Sp. nov | | Li et al. | Mid-Cretaceous | Kachin amber | Myanmar | | |
| Cretodilar galaxias | Sp. nov | | Li et al. | Mid-Cretaceous | Kachin amber | Myanmar | | |
| Cretodilar zhiqiae | Sp. nov | | Li et al. | Mid-Cretaceous | Kachin amber | Myanmar | | |
| Dryadithone | Gen. et sp. nov | | Li et al. | Cretaceous | Kachin amber | Myanmar | A member of the family Ithonidae. Genus includes new species D. cretacea. | |
| Heiemantispa | Gen. et sp. nov | Valid | Makarkin & Perkovsky | Eocene | Fur Formation | Denmark | A member of the family Mantispidae. The type species is H. storozhenkoi. | |
| Heteromantispa | Gen. et sp. nov | Valid | Xiang, Chen & Yang in Xiang et al. | Late Cretaceous (Cenomanian) | Kachin amber | Myanmar | A member of the family Mantispidae. The type species is H. polytricha. | |
| Huihuangocroce | Gen. et 2 sp. nov | | Yan et al. | Late Cretaceous (Cenomanian) | Kachin amber | Myanmar | A member of the family Nemopteridae. The type species is H. jiaxinae; genus also includes H. qini. | |
| Milubabinskaia | Gen. et sp. nov | Valid | Lu et al. | Cretaceous | Kachin amber | Myanmar | A member of the family Babinskaiidae. The type species is M. zhiqiae. | |
| Moltenopsychops | Gen. et sp. nov | Valid | Khramov et al. | Late Triassic | Molteno Formation | South Africa | A member of the family Osmylopsychopidae. Genus includes new species M. magnus. | |
| Nuddsia? jessicae | Sp. nov | Valid | Makarkin & Mock | Eocene (Ypresian) | Green River Formation | United States (Colorado) | A member of the family Osmylidae belonging to the subfamily Gumillinae. | |
| Palaeonallachius | Gen. et sp. nov | | Li et al. | Mid-Cretaceous | Kachin amber | Myanmar | Genus includes new species P. fangyuani. | |
| Parababinskaia weijie | Sp. nov | Valid | Lu et al. | Cretaceous | Kachin amber | Myanmar | A member of the family Babinskaiidae. | |
| Paradoxobabinskaia | Gen. et sp. nov | Valid | Jing, Zhuo & Liu | Cretaceous | Kachin amber | Myanmar | A member of the family Babinskaiidae. The type species is P. menglingyui. | |
| Promantispa rasnitsyni | Sp. nov | Valid | Makarkin & Khramov | Late Jurassic | Karabastau Formation | Kazakhstan | A member of the family Mantispidae. | |
| Protopalpares | Gen. et sp. nov | Valid | Makarkin & Archibald | Eocene | Green River Formation | United States (Wyoming) | An antlion. The type species is P. lindgrenae. | |
| Quadraticaput | Gen. et sp. nov | Valid | Kong et al. | Jurassic | Daohugou Beds | China | A larval representative of the lacewing superfamily Osmyloidea. The type species is Q. scleroticum. | |
| Stenobabinskaia chenjieae | Sp. nov | Valid | Lu et al. | Cretaceous | Kachin amber | Myanmar | A member of the family Babinskaiidae. | |
| Stenobabinskaia zhiqiae | Sp. nov | Valid | Jing, Zhuo & Liu | Cretaceous | Kachin amber | Myanmar | A member of the family Babinskaiidae. | |
| Tholomantispa | Gen. et comb. et sp. nov | Valid | Xiang, Chen & Yang in Xiang et al. | Late Cretaceous (Cenomanian) | Kachin amber | Myanmar | A member of the family Mantispidae. The type species is "Doratomantispa" zhangzhiqiae Li et al. (2022); genus also includes new species T. quinata. | |
| Tribelomantispa | Gen. et sp. nov | Valid | Xiang, Chen & Yang in Xiang et al. | Late Cretaceous (Cenomanian) | Kachin amber | Myanmar | A member of the family Mantispidae. The type species is T. yangjiani. | |
| Trimantispa | Gen. et sp. nov | Valid | Xiang, Chen & Yang in Xiang et al. | Late Cretaceous (Cenomanian) | Kachin amber | Myanmar | A member of the family Mantispidae. The type species is T. poseidoni. | |
| Yongling | Nom. nov | Valid | Kong et al. | Jurassic | Daohugou Beds | China | A member of the lacewing superfamily Osmyloidea; a replacement name for Natator Kong et al. (2024). | |

==== Neuropteran research ====
- Makarkin (2026) raises neuropteran subfamily Cretanallachiinae to the rank of a separate family Cretanallachiidae, interpreted as likely related to Dilaridae or ithonoid-like taxa.
- Makarkin, Simonsen & Perkovsky (2026) redescribe "Megalomus" densistriatus and confirm the 2024 placement into Archibaldia.
- Braga et al. (2026) redescribe the holotype specimen of Pulchroptilonia espatifata.

=== Raphidiopterans ===
==== Raphidiopteran research ====
- Evidence from the study of fossil record of snakeflies, indicative of greater morphological diversity of larvae of extinct snakeflies compared to extant ones and of greater overlap of morphologies of larvae and adults in extinct snakeflies compared to extant ones, is presented by Linhart et al. (2026).

== Clade †Palaeodictyopteroidea ==
=== †Megasecoptera ===
| Name | Novelty | Status | Authors | Age | Type locality | Country | Notes | Images |
|---|---|---|---|---|---|---|---|---|
| Rasnahymen | Fam. et gen. et sp. nov | Valid | Sinitshenkova & Felker | Permian | Poldarsa Formation | Russia (Vologda Oblast) | The type genus of the new family Rasnahymenidae. Genus includes new species R. arakelyani. | |

=== †Palaeodictyoptera ===
| Name | Novelty | Status | Authors | Age | Type locality | Country | Notes | Images |
|---|---|---|---|---|---|---|---|---|
| Pszowoptera | Gen. et sp. nov | Valid | Sampson, Toman & Prokop | Carboniferous | | Poland | A member of the family Spilapteridae. Genus includes new species P. rasnitsyni. | |

==== Palaeodictyopteran research ====
- Prokop et al. (2026) study the anatomy of the thorax of Eubleptus danielsi, reporting evidence of similarities of its pleuron with those of neopterans, and argue that the anatomy of the pleuron of E. danielsi might be similar to that of the last common ancestor of Pterygota.

== Clade Palaeoptera ==
=== Ephemeropterans ===
| Name | Novelty | Status | Authors | Age | Type locality | Country | Notes | Images |
|---|---|---|---|---|---|---|---|---|
| Bharataganodes | Gen. et comb. nov | Valid | Godunko et al. | Paleocene or Eocene | Palana Formation | India | A member of the family Teloganodidae; a new genus for "Teloganella" gurhaensis Agnihotri et al. (2020). | |
| Chibiphemera | Gen. et sp. nov | Valid | Godunko et al. | Cretaceous (Albian-Cenomanian) | Kachin amber | Myanmar | A member of the family Teloganodidae. The type species is C. cretalota. | |
| Crehkahtihtengia | Gen. et sp. nov | Valid | Stagg, Jiang, Staniczek & Godunko in Stagg et al. | Late Cretaceous (Cenomanian) | Kachin amber | Myanmar | A member of the family Hexagenitidae. The type species is C. dongi. | |
| Ecdyonurus hoffeinsorum | Sp. nov | Valid | Godunko & Cechowicz in Cechowicz et al. | Eocene | Baltic amber | Europe (Baltic Sea region) | A species of Ecdyonurus. | |
| Heptagenia baltica | Comb. nov | Valid | (Demoulin) | Eocene | Baltic amber | Russia (Kaliningrad Oblast) | A species of Heptagenia; moved from Cinygma baltica Demoulin (1968). | |
| Heptagenia demoulini | Sp. nov | Valid | Godunko, Benhadji & Staniczek in Benhadji et al. | Eocene | Baltic amber | Russia (Kaliningrad Oblast) | A species of Heptagenia sensu lato. | |
| Hexameropsis fehrmannorum | Sp. nov | Valid | Stagg, Jiang, Staniczek & Godunko in Stagg et al. | Late Cretaceous (Cenomanian) | Kachin amber | Myanmar | A member of the family Hexagenitidae. | |
| Venusdemilo | Fam. et gen. et sp. nov | Valid | Chen & Zheng | Cretaceous | Kachin amber | Myanmar | A mayfly, the type genus of the new family Venusdemiloidae. The type species is V. venusae. Published online in 2026, but the issue date is listed as December 2025. | |

==== Ephemeropteran research ====
- Kimitsuki et al. (2026) identify three-dimensional body impressions of mayfly larvae from the Upper Cretaceous Wapiti Formation (Alberta, Canada) described by Bell et al. (2013) as casts of larvae that buried themselves in the substrate, and name a new ichnotaxon Kalyptichnus belli.

=== Odonatopterans ===
| Name | Novelty | Status | Authors | Age | Type locality | Country | Notes | Images |
|---|---|---|---|---|---|---|---|---|
| Aeshna schmittii | Sp. nov | Valid | Sachse, Wappler & Nel | Miocene | | Germany | | |
| Cymatophlebia ganheensis | Sp. nov | | Yu, Zheng & Zhang in Yu et al. | Late Cretaceous (Santonian–Campanian) | Nenjiang Formation | China | A dragonfly belonging to the family Cymatophlebiidae. | |
| Eopetalia | Gen. et sp. nov. | Valid | Schädel & Wedmann | Eocene | Messel Formation | Germany | A dragonfly with affinities with the family Aeshnidae. The type species is E. messelensis. | |
| Gynacantha oligocenica | Sp. nov | Valid | Bernard et al. | Oligocene | | Poland | A member of the family Aeshnidae. | |
| Hemeroscopus jinjuensis | sp. nov. | Valid | Wei, Nam & Liu in Wei et al. | Early Cretaceous (Albian) | Jinju Formation | South Korea | A member of the family Hemeroscopidae. | |
| Labandeiraia burlingameae | sp. nov. | Valid | Archibald & Cannings | Eocene (Ypresian) | Allenby Formation | Canada (British Columbia) | A member of the family Eodichromatidae. | |
| Sinoprotolindenia | Gen. et sp. nov. | | Wei, Ren, Nel & Wang in Wei et al. | Early Cretaceous | Yixian Formation | China | A dragonfly belonging to the family Protolindeniidae. Genus includes new species S. zhengi. | |
| Yanangomphus | Gen. et sp. nov | | Wang, Nel & Zheng in Wang et al. | Middle Jurassic | Yanan Formation | China | A dragonfly belonging to the family Juragomphidae. The type species is Y. coloratus. | |

==== Odonatopteran research ====
- Béthoux et al. (2026) provide new information on the wing venation of Triassoneura andersoni.
- Archibald et al. (2026) interpret Shundeagrion cheni as a member of Cephalozygoptera belonging to the family Dysagrionidae.
- Huang et al. (2026) report the discovery of a forewing of Aeshna sp. from the strata of the Qaidam Basin (northeastern Tibetan Plateau; China), interpreted as indicative of presence of a warm freshwater ecosystem during the Miocene.

=== General palaeopteran research ===
- Du et al. (2026) provide phylogenomic evidence supporting monophyly of Palaeoptera, Early Devonian origin of the crown group of Pterygota and Late Devonian origin of the crown group of Palaeoptera.

== Clade Paraneoptera ==
=== Hemipterans ===
==== Auchenorrhyncha ====
| Name | Novelty | Status | Authors | Age | Type locality | Location | Notes | Images |
|---|---|---|---|---|---|---|---|---|
| Achilivaria | Gen. et sp. nov | | Lin et al. | Mid-Cretaceous | Kachin amber | Myanmar | A planthopper belonging to the family Achilidae. Genus includes new species A. laevidorsum. | |
| Aidanympha | Gen. et sp. nov | Valid | Shcherbakov | Cretaceous (Albian–Cenomanian) | Kachin amber | Myanmar | A member of the family Sinoalidae. The type species is A. thompsoni. | |
| Carbonatura | Gen. et sp. nov | Valid | Boderau et al. | Carboniferous (Moscovian) | Avion locality | France | A member of the stem group of Auchenorrhyncha belonging to the new infraorder Protoprosbolomorpha and to the new family Carbonaturidae. The type species is C. oudardi. | |
| Catonia pouilloni | Sp. nov | | Boderau & Nel in Boderau et al. | Miocene | Dominican amber | Dominican Republic | A planthopper belonging to the family Achilidae. | |
| Cretodorus noonoo | Sp. nov | | Fabrikant, Fu & Davranoglou | Late Cretaceous (Cenomanian) | Kachin amber | Myanmar | A planthopper belonging to the family Neazoniidae. | |
| Cretolala | Gen. et sp. nov | Valid | Jiang, Boderau, Jouault & Szwedo in Tang et al. | Late Cretaceous (Cenomanian) | Kachin amber | Myanmar | A planthopper belonging to the family Lalacidae. The type species is C. kachinensis. | |
| Dachibangus pallidus | Sp. nov | Valid | Fabrikant, Boderau & Fu | Mid-Cretaceous | Kachin amber | Myanmar | A planthopper belonging to the family Neazoniidae | |
| Dachibangus partialis | Sp. nov | Valid | Fabrikant, Boderau & Fu | Mid-Cretaceous | Kachin amber | Myanmar | A planthopper belonging to the family Neazoniidae | |
| Dachibangus pouilloni | Sp. nov | Valid | Fabrikant, Boderau & Fu | Mid-Cretaceous | Kachin amber | Myanmar | A planthopper belonging to the family Neazoniidae | |
| Dongbeicercopis | Gen. et sp. nov | | Chen et al. | Late Cretaceous (Santonian–Campanian) | Nenjiang Formation | China | A froghopper belonging to the family Procercopidae. Genus includes new species D. ganhensis. | |
| Dongningus | Gen. et comb. nov | | Zhang, Ning & Zhang in Zhang et al. | Late Triassic | Luoquanzhan Formation | China | A member of Cicadomorpha belonging to the family Dysmorphoptilidae. The type species is "Prosbolopsites" granulatus Hong & Chang (1993). | |
| Dysmorphoptiloides brunneum | Sp. nov | Valid | Lara & Cariglino | Late Triassic | Potrerillos Formation | Argentina | A member of the family Dysmorphoptilidae. | |
| Dysmorphoptiloides devincenziae | Sp. nov | Valid | Lara & Cariglino | Late Triassic | Potrerillos Formation | Argentina | A member of the family Dysmorphoptilidae. | |
| Eosassula | Gen. et sp. nov | Valid | Simonsen et al. | Eocene (Ypresian) | Fur Formation | Denmark | A planthopper. The type species is E. szwedoi. Announced in 2025; validated in 2026. | |
| Longjiangcixius | Gen. et sp. nov | | Lü, Ning & Zhang | Late Cretaceous (Santonian–Campanian) | Nenjiang Formation | China | A planthopper belonging to the family Cixiidae. Genus includes new species L. magnus. | |
| Mimamontsecia paucireticulata | Sp. nov | | Wang et al. | Late Cretaceous (Santonian–Campanian) | Nenjiang Formation | China | A planthopper. | |
| Mimamontsecia reticulata | Sp. nov | | Wang et al. | Late Cretaceous (Santonian–Campanian) | Nenjiang Formation | China | A planthopper. | |
| Myanmala | Fam. et gen. et sp. nov | | Chen et al. | Cretaceous | Kachin amber | Myanmar | A member of Cicadomorpha belonging to the superfamily Cercopoidea, the type genus of the new family Myanmalidae. Genus includes new species M. zireni. | |
| Pauchus | Gen. et 3 sp. nov | Valid | Iscavel & Pinedo-Escatel in Iscavel et al. | Miocene | Simojovel Formation (Mexican amber) | Mexico | A planthopper belonging to the family Nogodinidae. The type species is P. loisae; genus also includes P. nensak and P. tsakal. | |
| Pedioura | Gen. et sp. nov | Valid | Dietrich & Perkovsky | Eocene | Baltic amber | Russia (Kaliningrad Oblast) | A leafhopper. The type species is P. rotunda. | |
| Platyclamys | Gen. et sp. nov | Valid | Wang & Bourgoin in Sun, Bourgoin & Wang | Cretaceous | Kachin amber | Myanmar | A planthopper belonging to the family Yetkhatidae. Genus includes new species P. angulata. | |
| Shuixiuia | Gen. et sp. nov | Valid | Chen et al. | Cretaceous | Kachin amber | Myanmar | A member of the family Sinoalidae. Genus includes new species S. yuchenae. | |
| Sinonogodinia | Gen. et sp. nov | | Zhang, Chen & Zhang in Zhang et al. | Late Cretaceous (Santonian–Campanian) | Nenjiang Formation | China | A planthopper, probably a member of the family Nogodinidae. Genus includes new species S. cretacea. | |
| Tardivena | Gen. et sp. nov | Valid | Wang & Bourgoin in Sun, Bourgoin & Wang | Cretaceous | Kachin amber | Myanmar | A planthopper belonging to the family Yetkhatidae. Genus includes new species T. multiradiata. | |
| Techistetlus | Gen. et sp. nov | | Pinedo-Escatel & Iscavel in Pinedo-Escatel et al. | Pliocene | | Mexico | A member of the family Clastopteridae. The type species is T. punctocarinatus. | |
| Uralontina | Gen. et sp. nov | Valid | Shcherbakov | Late Triassic | | Russia (Chelyabinsk Oblast) | A member of the family Palaeontinidae. The type species is U. khamitovi. | |
| Wedelphus nielseni | Sp. nov | Valid | Shcherbakov, Emeljanov & Perkovsky | Eocene (Ypresian) | Fur Formation | Denmark | A planthopper belonging to the family Fulgoridae. | |

==== Heteroptera ====
| Name | Novelty | Status | Authors | Age | Type locality | Location | Notes | Images |
|---|---|---|---|---|---|---|---|---|
| Carcinonepa | Gen. et sp. nov | Valid | Haug et al. | Mid-Cretaceous | Kachin amber | Myanmar | A possible member of the family Gelastocoridae. The type species is C. libererrantes. | |
| Cretispongiosus | Gen. et sp. nov | Valid | Zhang, Yao & Liu in Zhang et al. | Mid-Cretaceous | | Myanmar | A member of the family Pachynomidae. The type species is C. conservatus. | |
| Daohugoucoris | Gen. et sp. nov | | Dai et al. | Middle Jurassic | Jiulongshan Formation | China | A member of Pachymeridiidae. The type species is D. punctatus. | |
| Eurydicoris | Gen. et sp. nov | Valid | Pinho et al. | Early Cretaceous (Aptian) | Crato Formation | Brazil | A member of the family Cydnidae. Genus includes new species E. tabulatus. | |
| Imesovelia | Gen. et sp. nov | Valid | Zhang et al. | Late Cretaceous (Cenomanian) | Kachin amber | Myanmar | A member of the family Mesoveliidae. Genus includes new species I. unispina. | |
| Libanohypselosoma slovacica | Sp. nov | | Vršanský et al. | Early Cretaceous (Aptian-Albian) | Nimnica Formation | Slovakia | A member of the family Schizopteridae. | |
| Mecocollaris membranosus | Sp. nov | | Ma, Ren & Yao | Mid-Cretaceous | | Myanmar | A member of the family Nabidae. | |
| Microcaulisoculus | Gen. et sp. et comb. nov | Valid | Faúndez | Late Cretaceous (Cenomanian) | Kachin amber | Myanmar | A member of the family Yuripopovinidae. The type species is M. durini; genus also includes "Caulisoculus" minutus Shang et al. (2020). | |
| Miracorizus parallelinervius | Sp. nov | Valid | Yang et al. | Middle Jurassic | Jiulongshan Formation | China | A member of Pentatomomorpha belonging to the family Kobdocoridae. | |
| Odorocoris | Gen. et sp. nov | | Dai et al. | Mid-Cretaceous | Kachin amber | Myanmar | A member of the family Rhopalidae. Genus includes new species O. longirostris. | |
| Paleoanomala decapitata | Sp. nov | | Davranoglou et al. | Early Cretaceous (Albian) | | Spain | A member of the family Tingidae. | |
| Paleocader rasnitsyni | Sp. nov | Valid | Golub et al. | Eocene | Rovno amber | Ukraine | A member of the family Tingidae. | |
| Popovocoris | Gen. et sp. nov | Valid | Monferran, Davranoglou & Peñalver | Late Cretaceous (Cenomanian) | Kachin amber | Myanmar | A member of the family Thaumastocoridae. The type species is P. punctatus. | |
| Subtilicoris | Gen. et sp. nov | | Dai et al. | Middle Jurassic | Jiulongshan Formation | China | A member of Pachymeridiidae. The type species is S. actuarius. | |

==== Sternorrhyncha ====
| Name | Novelty | Status | Authors | Age | Type locality | Location | Notes | Images |
|---|---|---|---|---|---|---|---|---|
| Caillardia sueva | Sp. nov | Valid | Burckhardt, Serbina & Kotthoff | Miocene | Randeck Maar Formation | Germany | A member of the family Aphalaridae. | |
| Carbopsyllidium | Gen. et sp. nov | Valid | Boderau et al. | Carboniferous (Moscovian) | Avion locality | France | A member of the infraorder Psyllaeformia belonging to the superfamily Protopsyllidioidea and to the family Permopsyllidiidae. The type species is C. minutum. | |
| Cenomaleurodicus | Gen. et sp. nov | Valid | Caballero et al. | Late Cretaceous (Cenomanian) | Kachin amber | Myanmar | A whitefly. The type species is C. multiporus. | |
| Cinara cerasina | Sp. nov | Valid | Węgierek et al. | Miocene | | Russia (Stavropol Krai) | A member of Lachninae. | |
| Cretacerifera | Gen. et sp. nov | Valid | Caballero et al. | Late Cretaceous (Cenomanian) | Kachin amber | Myanmar | A whitefly. The type species is C. mranmaense. | |
| Cretapsylla asperantenna | Sp. nov | Valid | Ivanov | Cretaceous (Albian–Cenomanian) | Kachin amber | Myanmar | A member of the family Liadopsyllidae. | |
| Cretapsylla kruglikovi | Sp. nov | Valid | Ivanov | Cretaceous (Albian–Cenomanian) | Kachin amber | Myanmar | A member of the family Liadopsyllidae. | |
| Curraphis | Gen. et sp. nov | Valid | Ogłaza & Węgierek in Ogłaza, Kalandyk-Kołodziejczyk & Węgierek | Late Cretaceous (Campanian) | | Canada (Manitoba) | A member of Aphidoidea of uncertain affinities. The type species is C. velox. | |
| Derivatupsyllidium | Gen. et sp. nov | | Mnguni, Maseko & Mauda in Mnguni et al. | Late Cretaceous (possibly Turonian) | | Botswana | A member of Psyllaeformia belonging to the group Protopsyllidioidea and the family Postopsyllidiidae. Genus includes new species D. kimperlitis. | |
| Lachnus fusus | Sp. nov | Valid | Węgierek et al. | Miocene | | Spain | A member of Lachninae. | |
| Lachnus miocaenicus | Sp. nov | Valid | Węgierek et al. | Miocene | | Spain | A member of Lachninae. | |
| Latialiaphis | Gen. et sp. nov | Valid | Ogłaza & Węgierek in Ogłaza, Kalandyk-Kołodziejczyk & Węgierek | Late Cretaceous (Campanian) | | Canada (Manitoba) | A member of Palaeoaphidoidea belonging to the family Palaeoaphididae. The type species is L. oblita. | |
| Matronaphis | Gen. et sp. nov | Valid | Ogłaza & Węgierek in Ogłaza, Kalandyk-Kołodziejczyk & Węgierek | Late Cretaceous (Campanian) | | Canada (Manitoba) | A member of Aphidoidea belonging to the family Thelaxidae. The type species is C. breviantennata. | |
| Palaeoaleuroclava | Gen. et sp. nov | Valid | Caballero et al. | Late Cretaceous (Cenomanian) | Kachin amber | Myanmar | A whitefly. The type species is P. grandirostrata. | |
| Paternapsyllidium | Gen. et sp. nov | | Mnguni, Maseko & Mauda in Mnguni et al. | Late Cretaceous (possibly Turonian) | | Botswana | A member of Psyllaeformia belonging to the group Protopsyllidioidea and the family Postopsyllidiidae. Genus includes new species P. mckayi. | |
| Podococcus | Gen. et sp. nov | Valid | Kalandyk-Kołodziejczyk & Wegierek in Wegierek et al. | Eocene | Sakhalinian amber | Russia (Sakhalin Oblast) | A member of the family Eriococcidae. Genus includes new species P. elzbietae. | |
| Poljanka jiyuanensis | Sp. nov | Valid | Hakim, Xu & Huang | Middle Jurassic | Yangshuzhuang Formation | China | A member of the family Protopsyllidiidae. | |

==== Hemipteran research ====
- Fabrikant, Fu & Davranoglou (2026) describe a new type of flexible and highly elongated labium in Cretaceous planthoppers that was specialized for feeding on thick barked vegetation. hesstudy also ynonymized the family Mimarachnidae with Neazoniidae.
- Xu, Zhao & Zhang (2026) describe a new specimen of Dracaphis angustata from the Middle Triassic (Ladinian) strata of the Tongchuan Formation (China), representing the oldest record of Naibiomorpha reported to date.
- Haug et al. (2026) report the discovery of a group of wax-bearing (likely for defensive purposes) immatures of scale insects in a piece of Cretaceous Kachin amber (Myanmar) that also preserved an adult rove beetle and an aphidlion-like larva which might have been predators of scale insects.
- A specimen of Auritibicen cf. flammatus representing the largest well-preserved cicadid fossil reported to date is described from the Pleistocene (Chibanian) Miyajima Formation (Japan) by Aiba & Hayashi (2026).

=== Permopsocida ===
- Li et al. (2026) study the wing shape evolution in Permopsocida, reporting evidence of a bottleneck coinciding with the Permian–Triassic extinction event and structural constraints limiting aerodynamic innovation in the aftermath of this extinction, as well as evidence linking changes of morphological diversity of wings of Permopsocida to changes of diversity of gymnosperm plants.

=== Psocodea ===
| Name | Novelty | Status | Authors | Age | Type locality | Location | Notes | Images |
|---|---|---|---|---|---|---|---|---|
| Archiphthirus | Gen. et sp. nov | Valid | Clodfelter & Heads | Eocene | Green River Formation | United States (Colorado) | A louse of uncertain affinities. The type species is A. eidolon. | |
| Palaeocompsocus | Gen. et sp. nov | Valid | Liang | Cretaceous | | Myanmar | A member of the family Compsocidae. Genus includes new species P. luoxiaoae. | |

=== Other paraneopterans ===
| Name | Novelty | Status | Authors | Age | Type locality | Location | Notes | Images |
|---|---|---|---|---|---|---|---|---|
| Keimelioptera | Fam. et gen. et 2 sp. nov | Valid | Criscione-Vastano et al. | Late Triassic (Norian) | Cow Branch Formation | United States (North Carolina) | A member of the stem group of Paraneoptera; the type genus of the new family Keimeliopteridae. The type species is K. solensis; genus also includes K. rara. | |

== Phasmatodeans ==
| Name | Novelty | Status | Authors | Age | Type locality | Location | Notes | Images |
|---|---|---|---|---|---|---|---|---|
| Coniphasma breve | Sp. nov | Valid | Zhao et al. | Early Cretaceous | Yixian Formation | China | A member of the family Susumaniidae. | |
| Coniphasma inflatum | Sp. nov | Valid | Zhao et al. | Early Cretaceous | Yixian Formation | China | A member of the family Susumaniidae. | |

=== Phasmatodean research ===
- A new specimen of Pseudoperla gracilipes, providing new information on the morphology of members of Archipseudophasmatidae (including similarities to Obriminae), is described from the Eocene Baltic amber (Kaliningrad Oblast, Russia) by Pouillon, Ngô Muller & Nel (2026).

== Plecopterans ==
| Name | Novelty | Status | Authors | Age | Type locality | Location | Notes | Images |
|---|---|---|---|---|---|---|---|---|
| Heminemoura | Gen. et sp. nov | Valid | Chen | Eocene | Baltic amber | Europe (Baltic Sea region) | A member of the family Nemouridae. Genus includes new species H. triloba. Published online in 2026, but the issue date is listed as December 2025. | |

== Other insects ==
| Name | Novelty | Status | Authors | Age | Type locality | Country | Notes | Images |
|---|---|---|---|---|---|---|---|---|
| Burmazoros | Gen. et comb. nov | Valid | Kočárek, Kočárková & Kundrata | Late Cretaceous (Cenomanian) | Kachin amber | Myanmar | A member of Zoraptera belonging to the family Zorotypidae; a new genus for "Zorotypus" denticulatus Yin, Cai & Huang (2018). | |
| Chauliodites qujingensis | Sp. nov | | Hu, Zheng & Zhang in Hu et al. | Early Triassic | Kayitou Formation | China | A winged relative of ice crawlers belonging to the family Chaulioditidae. | |
| Chosha | Gen. et sp. nov | Valid | Tihelka et al. | Carboniferous (Mississippian) | Tesnus Formation | United States (Texas) | A hexapod that might be an early-diverging insect. Genus includes new species C. praecursor. | |
| Cretembia | Gen. et sp. nov | Valid | Liu et al. | Late Cretaceous | | Myanmar | A member of Embioptera belonging to the family Scelembiidae. Genus includes new species C. longimandibula. | |
| Cretozoros | Gen. et comb. nov | Valid | Kočárek, Kočárková & Kundrata | Late Cretaceous (Cenomanian) | Kachin amber | Myanmar | A member of Zoraptera belonging to the family Spiralizoridae. The type species is "Zorotypus" acanthothorax Engel & Grimaldi (2002); genus also includes "Zorotypus" pusillus Chen & Su (2019). | |
| Electroclothoda | Gen. et sp. nov | Valid | Liu et al. | Late Cretaceous | | Myanmar | A member of Embioptera belonging to the family Clothodidae. Genus includes new species E. aroliata. | |
| Enigmapaolia | Gen. et sp. nov | Valid | Huang & Nel in Huang et al. | Permian (Cisuralian) | Shanxi Formation | China | A member of Polyneoptera of uncertain affinities, possibly a member of Paoliida. Genus includes new species E. shanxiensis. | |
| Palatinopsis | Gen. et sp. nov | Valid | Henrotay et al. | Permian (Asselian) | Rotliegend Group | Germany | A member of Paoliida belonging to the family Blattinopsidae. Genus includes new species P. daliamarquesae. | |
| Parasorellembia grandiocula | Sp. nov | Valid | Liu et al. | Late Cretaceous | | Myanmar | A member of Embioptera belonging to the family Scelembiidae. | |

=== Other insect research ===
- Béthoux (2026) reinterprets purported stem-plecopteran Gulou oudardi as a member of the family Blattinopsidae belonging to the genus Avionblattinopsis.
- A small insect specimen (possibly a larva of a member of Holometabola) with an undifferentiated abdomen including eleven segments, representing a morphology different from all extant insects but similar to hypothesized character set of the ancestral insect form, is described from the Permian strata from the Meisenheim Formation (Saar–Nahe Basin, Germany) by Haug et al. (2026).
- Lai & Huang (2026) report the discovery of a forewing of Sinosepididontus shartegicus from the Jurassic Haifanggou Formation (China), extending known geographical range of the species (originally described from the Shar Teeg Beds in Mongolia) and supporting the biotic link between faunas from the localities preserving its fossils.
- Heřmanová, Mendes & Kvaček (2026) describe an insect egg of uncertain affinities from the Upper Cretaceous (Coniacian) strata from the Mina fossil site (Portugal), and name a new ootaxon Palaeoaldrovanda seadouroensis.

== General research ==
- DeKoster & McCoy (2026) review the fossil evidence of evolution of wood-boring insects.
- Laaß et al. (2026) identify feeding tunnels with coprolites within Prototaxites stem fragments from Germany, interpreted as evidence of existence of insects adapted to feeding on Prototaxites from inside in the early Devonian, and name new coprolite ichnotaxa Hexacoprus zenneri and H. elongatus.
- Snelling et al. (2026) argue that diffusive oxygen transport through the tracheolar–muscle system of insects was not a factor constraining the maximum body size of insects throughout their evolutionary history, including the evolution of body size of large extinct insects such as Meganeuropsis permiana.
- Negri & Toledo (2026) review evidence of mutualistic relationships between insects and gymnosperms before the emergence of flowering plants.
- Cunha, Battista & Francischini (2026) study bioerosion traces in bones from the Upper Triassic strata of the Santa Cruz Sequence of the Santa Maria Supersequence (Brazil) interpreted as most likely produced by insects, name a new ichnotaxon Osteograptus thanatobios, and report evidence of increase of diversity and abundance of bioerosion records throughout the Triassic.
- Stahlecker et al. (2026) describe new insect larvae with megalopteran-like morphology from the Triassic strata from Grès à Voltzia (France), from the Cretaceous amber from Myanmar and from the Eocene Baltic amber, and interpret the larval "morphotype 4" identified in the study of Baranov et al. (2022) as more likely representing larvae of myxophagan beetles than megalopterans.
- Haug et al. (2026) report the discovery of diverse immature insect specimens from the Cretaceous amber from Myanmar preserved with evidence of disruptive coloration in the form of stripes on their legs.
- Zhao, Huang & Cai (2026) report the first discovery of a male of Pelretes bicolor from the Cretaceous amber from Myanmar, and identify pollen diagnostic of Erdtmanithecales associated with Pelretes vivificus and members of the genus Parallelothrips from the Myanmar amber, indicative of pollination of Cretaceous Erdtmanithecales by both thrips and kateretid beetles.
- Kiesmüller et al. (2026) report the discovery of a braconid wasp and the first known silvanid beetle larva preserved within a piece of the Baltic amber.
- Andrade, Carneiro & Silva (2026) identify traces of bioerosion in dentaries of metatherian mammals from the Paleogene Itaboraí Basin (Brazil) and in megafaunal remains from Pleistocene natural tank deposits in the northeastern Brazil that were produced by colonial insects, and name new ichnotaxa Asteroichnus radialis, Maiandroichnus titanicus, M. osteophagus and M. depressus.
