= Neapterolelaps =

Scientific classification
- Domain: Eukaryota
- Kingdom: Animalia
- Phylum: Arthropoda
- Class: Insecta
- Order: Hymenoptera
- Family: Pteromalidae
- Subfamily: Diparinae
- Genus: Neapterolelaps; Girault, 1913

Genus of insects

Neapterolelaps is a genus of Hymenoptera belonging to the family Pteromalidae. The species in the genus are diurnal.

The species of this genus are found in Australia.

Species:

- Neapterolelaps leai Dodd, 1924
- Neapterolelaps lodgei Girault, 1913
- Neapterolelaps nigrisaepta (Girault, 1929)
- Neapterolelaps paraeneiceps Sureshan & Binoy, 2019
