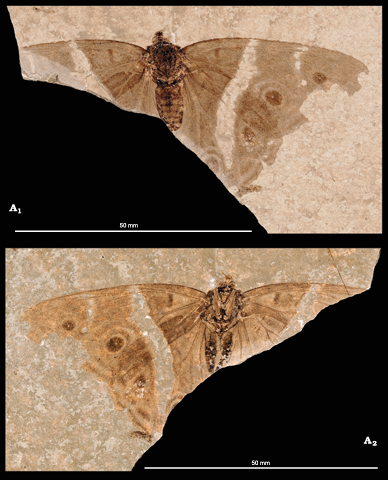
- Holotype fossil and its counterpart

Scientific classification
- Kingdom: Animalia
- Phylum: Arthropoda
- Class: Insecta
- Order: Lepidoptera
- Family: Nymphalidae
- Subfamily: Apaturinae
- Genus: Apaturoides; Rajaei et al., 2026
- Species: A. monikae

Binomial name
- Apaturoides monikae Rajae et al., 2026

= Apaturoides =

Apaturoides Temporal range: 34–28 Ma

Extinct species of Oligocene butterfly

Apaturoides is an extinct genus of butterfly from the Oligocene Campagne-Calavon Formation in the Luberon UNESCO Global Geopark, southeastern France. It belongs to the family Nymphalidae and contains only one species : A. monikae.

== Discovery and naming ==
The sole known specimen and its counterpart were found in the northern flank of the Luberon Mountain, south of the Céreste-en-Luberon village in the Alpes-de-Haute-Provence, southeastern France. It comes from the Campagne-Calavon Formation dating back to the Oligocene Rupelian epoch, 33.9–27.82 Ma ago. This is a laminated limestone formation that represents lacustrine deposits.
The fossil was found preserved between two asymmetrical rhombus-shaped limestone layers. The head, thorax and abdomen are exceptionally well-preserved, as are the right wing and most of the left wing.

The genus name is a combination of Apatura and the Ancient Greek "eidḗs (ειδής)" which means "resembling" or "connected to" because of the close relationship between Apaturoides and Apatura. The species name honors Monika Lutz-Scholz, the wife of Herbert Lutz who discovered the fossil in 1979.

== Description ==
The eyes are partially visible. The right antenna preserves only four basal segments, while the left antenna is missing. The haustellum (proboscis) is well developed, not coiled and measures approximately 0.9 mm.

The thorax is covered with scales. The legs are not entirely preserved, they appear well developed. The forelegs are not reduced.

The abdomen is quite thick and short.

The fossil has a wingspan of approximately 90 mm. The venation of the wings is well visible. The forewing margin is smooth. The hindwing margin is waved. Two dark streaks extend all over the margins of both wings. Wing patterns are preserved : a large grey band extends through the median area of both wings, the second band is more distally located and restricted to the anterior region of the forewing. Several variably sized dark eyespots are also preserved on both wings : two on the forewing and three on the hindwing. The anterior-most spot of the forewing is small with a white dot in the middle, its maximum diameter is 3.1 mm. The other spot of the forewing is larger with two light outer rings separated by a dark ring. The center dark spot has a maximum diameter of 4.3 mm. The eyespots on the hindwing are similar, the anterior-most has a 3.7 mm diameter with a large light outer ring, the lowest spot 3.9 mm wide. The last spot is very small and located just next to the lowest one.

== Paleoenvironment ==
Several fossil sites in the Campagne-Calavon Formation represent a Lagerstätte that documents a calm shallow lacustrine environment with periodic salinity variations. These variations may have been caused by connections to the sea as suggested by the jellyfish fossils. A diverse fauna and flora was found in this Lagerstätte such as plants like Lygodium, Osmunda, gymnosperms and many angiosperms, fishes like Dapalis and Lepidocottus, ranids, crocodylians like Diplocynodon, birds such as Jacamatia and Cerestenia, mammals like Bachitherium and numerous insects.
