= Lelaps striaticeps =

Scientific classification
- Kingdom: Animalia
- Phylum: Arthropoda
- Class: Insecta
- Order: Hymenoptera
- Family: Diparidae
- Genus: Lelaps
- Species: L. striaticeps

Binomial name
- Lelaps striaticeps Strand, 1911

Species of wasp

Lelaps striaticeps is a species of Hymenoptera in the family Diparidae. The scientific name of this species was first published 1911 by Strand.
