= Lelaps =

Scientific classification
- Kingdom: Animalia
- Phylum: Arthropoda
- Class: Insecta
- Order: Hymenoptera
- Family: Diparidae
- Genus: Lelaps; Walker, 1843

Species
- Over 40

Synonyms
- Dilaelaps Schulz, 1906; Stenopistha Strand, 1910; Spalangiolaelaps Girault, 1916

Genus of wasps

Lelaps is a genus of chalcidoid wasps in the family Diparidae (formerly in Pteromalidae). There are over 40 described species in Lelaps.

== Species ==
The following species are accepted within Lelaps:

- Lelaps abdominalis Ashmead, 1904
- Lelaps aeneiceps Ashmead, 1904
- Lelaps affinis Ashmead, 1904
- Lelaps albipes Cameron, 1884
- Lelaps albofasciata Hedqvist, 1964
- Lelaps annulicornua (Strand, 1911)
- Lelaps apicalis Ashmead, 1904
- Lelaps avicula Haliday, 1844
- Lelaps beckeri Yoshimoto, 1977
- Lelaps bimaculata Ashmead, 1904
- Lelaps callisto Marshall, 1892
- Lelaps caudatula (Strand, 1911)
- Lelaps decorata Walker, 1862
- Lelaps ferrierei Hedqvist, 1964
- Lelaps ferruginea Cameron, 1884
- Lelaps flagellata (Strand, 1911)
- Lelaps flavescens Ashmead, 1894
- Lelaps floridensis Yoshimoto, 1977
- Lelaps halidayi Ashmead, 1904
- Lelaps insularis Mercet, 1927
- Lelaps magnifica (Strand, 1911)
- Lelaps melina Yoshimoto, 1977
- Lelaps ornata (Strand, 1911)
- Lelaps paraguayensis Girault, 1912
- Lelaps picta Walker, 1862
- Lelaps pulchella (Strand, 1911)
- Lelaps pulchra Girault, 1912
- Lelaps pulchricornis Walker, 1843
- Lelaps pygata (Strand, 1911)
- Lelaps rectivitta (Strand, 1911)
- Lelaps rhomboidea (Strand, 1911)
- Lelaps sadales (Walker, 1839)
- Lelaps setifrons (Strand, 1911)
- Lelaps simplex (Fabricius, 1804)
- Lelaps striaticeps (Strand, 1911)
- Lelaps striata Yoshimoto, 1977
- Lelaps stylata Ashmead, 1904
- Lelaps terebrans (Strand, 1911)
- Lelaps tibialis Cameron, 1884
- Lelaps viridiceps (Strand, 1911)
- Lelaps vittipennis (Strand, 1911)
