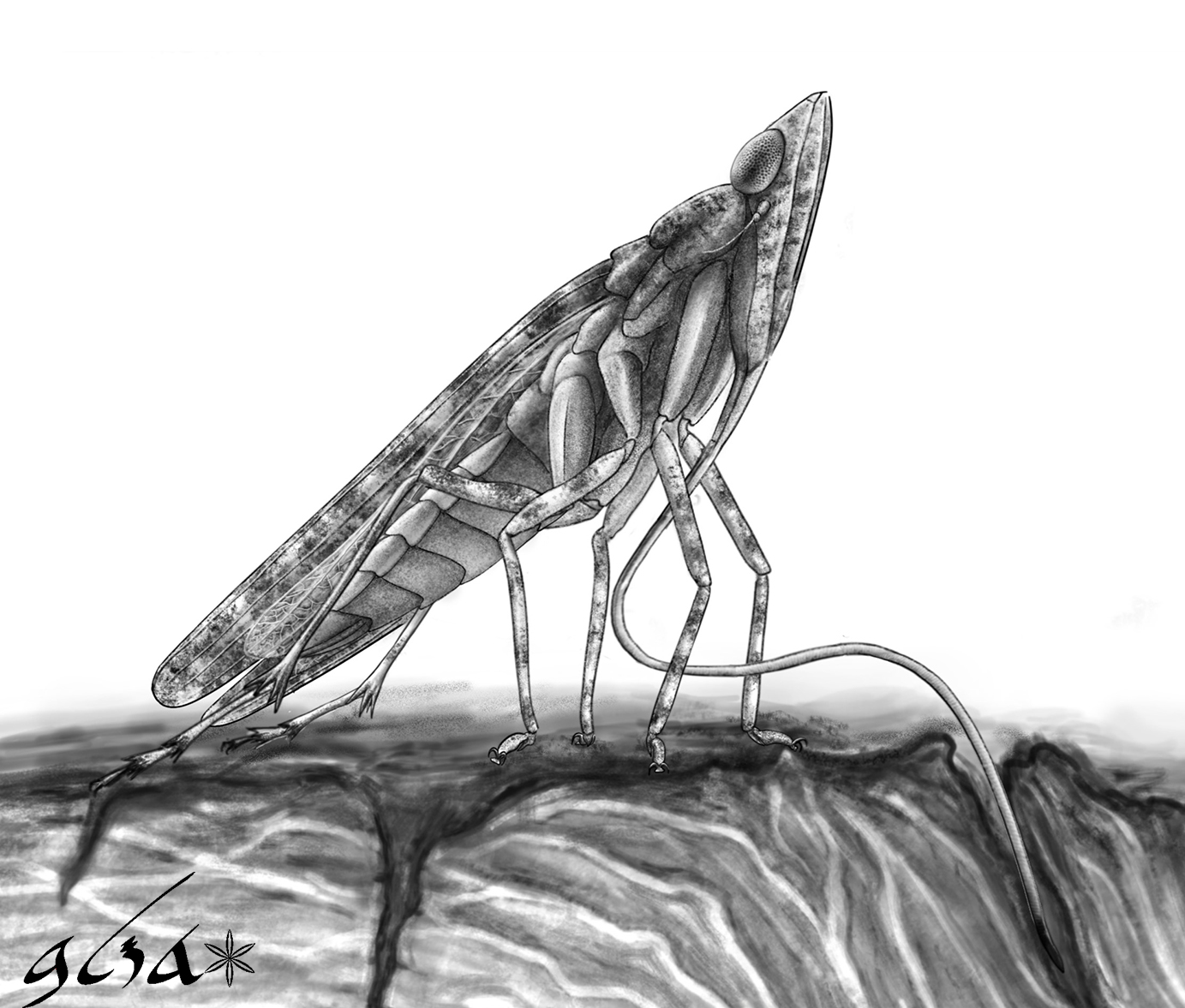
- Cretodorus noonoo

Scientific classification
- Kingdom: Animalia
- Phylum: Arthropoda
- Clade: Pancrustacea
- Class: Insecta
- Order: Hemiptera
- Suborder: Auchenorrhyncha
- Infraorder: Fulgoromorpha
- Family: Neazoniidae; Szwedo, 2007

Synonyms
- Mimarachnidae Scherbakov 2007

= Neazoniidae =

Neazoniidae Temporal range: Barremian–Turonian

Extinct family of planthoppers

Neazoniidae is an extinct family of planthoppers known from the Cretaceous period. It was initially named by Szwedo in 2007 based on nymphal specimens. Recently the family Mimarachnidae has been synonymized with Neazoniidae based on their unique mouthpart morphology. The family is characterized by an elongated distal segment of the labium bearing dense transverse wrinkles which has allowed it to flex, in a manner unlike all other living and extinct members of the suborder Auchenorrhyncha. This adaptation is thought to have allowed these insects to access the sap of thick barked trees.

The adults of this family, previously referred to the family 'Mimarachnidae' are easily distinguished by a double carination of the pronotum and mesonotum, simplified forewing venation interconnected by a mesh of polygonal veinlets, and the reduced armature on the hind tibiae.

The forewing coloration of these planthoppers is surprisingly diverse, and includes many patterns consisting of mottling, colored bands, and spots, the name 'Mimarachnidae' was derived from spots on the wings of the first described adult specimens belonging to the genera Mimarachne and Saltissus, as being suggestive of spider mimicry, but these characters are not distinctive for the family as a whole.

== Classification ==
- †Akmazeina Szwedo, 2009
- †Ayaimatum Jiang & Szwedo in Jiang et al., 2020 Burmese amber, Myanmar, Cenomanian
  - †Ayaimatum trilobatum Jiang & Szwedo in Jiang et al., 2020
  - †Ayaimatum minutum Fu & Huang, 2021
- †Burmissus Shcherbakov, 2017 Burmese amber, Myanmar, Cenomanian
  - †Burmissus raunoi Shcherbakov, 2017
  - †Burmissus szwedoi Luo et al., 2020
  - †Burmissus latimaculatus Fu & Huang, 2020
- †Chalicoridulum Szwedo & Ansorge, 2015 La Pedrera de Rúbies Formation, Spain, Barremian
  - †Chalicoridulum montsecensis Szwedo & Ansorge, 2015
- †Cretodorus Fu & Huang, 2020 Burmese amber, Myanmar, Cenomanian
  - †Cretodorus granulatus Fu & Huang, 2020
  - †Cretodorus angustus Fu & Huang, 2020
  - †Cretodorus rostellatus Zhang et al, 2021
  - †Cretodorus noonoo Fabrikant, Fu & Davranoglou, 2026
- †Dachibangus Jiang et al., 2018 Burmese amber, Myanmar, Cenomanian
  - †Dachibangus trimaculatus Jiang et al, 2018
  - †Dachibangus zhuoyuanshengi Wang et al, 2025
  - †Dachibangus pallidus Fabrikant et al, 2026
  - †Dachibangus partialis Fabrikant et al.
  - †Dachibangus pouilloni Fabrikant et al.
- †Jaculistilus Zhang et al., 2018 Burmese amber, Myanmar, Cenomanian
  - †Jaculistilus oligotrichus Zhang et al, 2018
- †Mimamontsecia Szwedo & Ansorge, 2015 La Pedrera de Rúbies Formation, Spain, Barremian
  - †Mimamontsecia cretacea Szwedo & Ansorge, 2015
- †Mimaplax Jiang et al., 2019 Burmese amber, Myanmar, Cenomanian
  - †Mimaplax ekrypsan Jiang et al., 2019
- †Mimaeurypterus Fu & Huang, 2021 Burmese amber, Myanmar, Cenomanian
  - †Mimaeurypterus burmiticus Fu & Huang, 2021
- †Mimarachne Shcherbakov, 2007 Zaza Formation, Russia, Aptian
  - †Mimarachne mikhailovi Shcherbakov, 2007
- †Multistria Zhang, Yao & Pang, 2021 Burmese amber, Myanmar, Cenomanian
  - †Multistria orthotropa Zhang, Yao & Pang, 2021
  - †Multistria Juanae Fabrikant et al. 2024
  - †Multistria irregularis Fabrikant et al. 2024
  - †Multistria Fionae Fabrikant et al. 2024
- †Nipponoridium Szwedo, 2008 Kuwajima Formation, Japan, Lower Cretaceous
  - †Nipponoridium matsuoi Fujiyama, 1978 (Formerly Fulgoridium)
- †Neazonia Szwedo, 2007
- †Saltissus Shcherbakov, 2007
  - †Saltissus eskovi Shcherbakov, 2007 Zaza Formation, Russia, Aptian
  - †Saltissus fennahi Luo, Liu & Jarzembowski, 2021 Weald Clay, England, Barremian
- †Xiachibangus Jiang et al., 2019
  - †Xiachibangus formosus Fu et al., 2019
  - †Xiachibangus hui Zhang, Yao & Pang, 2021

Undescribed specimens are known from the Early Cretaceous Turga and Khetana localities of Russia, the Barremian-Aptian Khurilt locality of Mongolia, and the Turonian Kzyl-Zhar locality of Kazakhstan.
