= Avion locality =

Fossil locality in France

- Stratigraphic range: Serpukhovian - Moscovian

Location
- Region: Pas-de-Calais
- Country: France

Type section
- Named for: Avion, Pas-de-Calais

The Avion locality is a carboniferous lagerstätte in France. This lagerstätte is located in a coal slag-heap outside the town of Avion in the region of Pas-de-Calais. Unfortunately, as this slag heap is closed and no new fossils are able to be obtained outside of the paleobiota previously identified. In addition, the coal where the scraps are obtained has not been assigned to any formation.

== Paleobiota identified ==
=== Arthropods ===
Arthropods
Genus	Species	Higher taxon	Notes	Images
Archaeogerarus	A. schubneli	Archaeogeraridae (Archaeorthoptera)	Placed in a monotypic family	
Aviobiella	A. garroustei	Permobiellidae (Caloneurodea)		
Aviobreyeria	A. gracilis	Breyeriidae (Palaeodictyoptera)	Discovered alongside indeterminate immature breyeriids	
Aviocladus	A. pectinatus	Cnemidolestodea (Archaeorthoptera)	Indeterminate family, as finer cnemidolestodean relationships are unclear	
Aviogramma	A. gracilis	Caloneurodea	Indeterminate family	
Aviohapaloptera	A. bethouxi	Archaeorthoptera	Different from all other archaeorthopteran families	
Aviologus	A. duquesnei	Archaeorthoptera	Similar to Heterologus	
Avionblattinopsis	A. oudardi	Blattinopsidae (Paoliida)	First blattinopsid known from Avion	
Avionbrodia	A. incompleta	Diaphanopterodea?		
Avionpaolia	A. amansfossila	Paoliida	Species name translates to “those who love fossils”, recognising the efforts of people who collected fossils from Avion	
Avionptera	A. communeaui	Fatjanopteridae (Plecoptera)	Related to the formerly enigmatic genus Fatjanoptera	
Avionugonioneura	A. jouaulti	Nugonioneuridae? (Archaeorthoptera)	Most similar to nugonioneurids, but still differs somewhat from them	
Avionxixia	A. gui	Cnemidolestidae (Archaeorthoptera)	Similar to the Chinese genus Xixia	
Aviorrhyncha	A. magnifica	Aviorrhynchidae (Hemiptera)	Earliest known hemipteran	
Avioxyela	A. gallica	Stem-Hymenoptera (Hymenopterida)	Earliest known hymenopteran relative	
Beloatta	B. duquesnei	Eoblattidae (Polyneoptera)		
Cacurgus	C. avionensis	Cacurgidae (Archaeorthoptera)	Discovery led to Cacurgidae being moved closer to Orthoptera	
Carbonatura	C. oudardi	Carbonaturidae (stem group Auchenorrhyncha)		
Carbopsyllidium	C. minutum	Permopsyllidiidae (Hemiptera)		
Enigmaptera	E. magnifica	Paneodonatoptera (Odonatoptera)	One of numerous convergently damselfly-like odonatopterans	
Fusiogramma	F. minuta	Caloneurodea (Archaeorthoptera)	A relatively small archaeorthopteran	
Gallotupus	G. oudardi	Meganeuridae	One of the first insects described from Avion	
Gulou	G. oudardi	Plecoptera	Shares a genus with a fossil from the Yanghugou Formation	Gulou carpenteri, a species of Gulou from China
Homoiopteridae indet.	Unapplicable	Paleodictyoptera	Known from a base of a ~20 cm-long wing	
Jacquesoudardia	J. magnifica	Protozygoptera	Bears convergently damselfly-like wings	
Paolia	P. sp	Paoliida	Known from a fragmentary wing	
Piesbergopterum	P. avionensis	Cnemidolestodea (Archaeorthoptera)	Also known from Piesburg quarry as its name suggests	
Spilaptera	S. splendens	Spilapteridae	Named after the fossil’s exquisite preservation	
Theiatitan	T. azari	Titanoptera	Earliest known titanopteran, may have communicated via wing-produced light flashes or crepitation (crackling sounds produced from wingbeats in some orthopterans)	Theiatitan holotype fossil
Westphalomerope	W. maryvonneae	Protomeropidae (Panorpida)	Earliest holometabolan insect discovered (when it was described)	
Westphalopsocus	W. pumilio	Westphalopsocidae (Psocodea)	Earliest known psocodean	
Westphalothripides	W. oudardi	Westphalothripidesidae (Stem-Thysanoptera)	Earliest known thrips	
