= Cerestenia =

Cerestenia Temporal range: Rupelian

Scientific classification
- Kingdom: Animalia
- Phylum: Chordata
- Class: Aves
- Order: Charadriiformes
- Family: †Turnipacidae
- Genus: †Cerestenia
- Species: †C. pulchrapenna

Binomial name
- †Cerestenia pulchrapenna Mayr, 2000

Extinct genus of birds

Cerestenia is an extinct genus of shorebird that lived during the Rupelian stage of the Oligocene epoch.

== Distribution ==
Cerestenia pulchrapenna is known from the site of Céreste in France.
