= Cupidoblatta =

Cupidoblatta Temporal range: Cenomanian

Scientific classification
- Kingdom: Animalia
- Phylum: Arthropoda
- Clade: Pancrustacea
- Class: Insecta
- Order: Blattodea
- Family: Corydiidae
- Genus: †Cupidoblatta
- Species: †C. elegans

Binomial name
- †Cupidoblatta elegans Sendi et al., 2026

Extinct genus of cockroach

Cupidoblatta is an extinct genus of corydiid cockroach that lived in Myanmar during the Cenomanian stage of the Late Cretaceous epoch. It is a monotypic genus that contains the species Cupidoblatta elegans.

== Palaeobiology ==
Only males of C. elegans possess bipectinate antennae, indicating strong sexual selection existed in this species.
