= Brachypogon =

Scientific classification
- Domain: Eukaryota
- Kingdom: Animalia
- Phylum: Arthropoda
- Class: Insecta
- Order: Diptera
- Family: Ceratopogonidae
- Genus: Brachypogon; Kieffer, 1899

Genus of flies

Brachypogon is a genus of flies belonging to the family Ceratopogonidae.

The genus was first described by Kieffer in 1899.

The genus has almost cosmopolitan distribution.

Species:

- Brachypogon nitidulus
- Brachypogon perpusillus
- Brachypogon sociabilis
- Brachypogon vitiosus
