= Yetkhatidae =

Scientific classification
- Domain: Eukaryota
- Kingdom: Animalia
- Phylum: Arthropoda
- Class: Insecta
- Order: Hemiptera
- Suborder: Auchenorrhyncha
- Infraorder: Fulgoromorpha
- Family: Yetkhatidae; Song et al. 2019

Extinct family of planthoppers

Yetkhatidae is an extinct family of planthoppers. It was named by Song, Xu, Liang, Szwedo & Bourgoin in 2019, and contains 2 genera.

== Genera ==
- † Parwaina Song, Szwedo & Bourgoin, 2019
- † Yetkhata Song, Szwedo & Bourgoin, 2019
