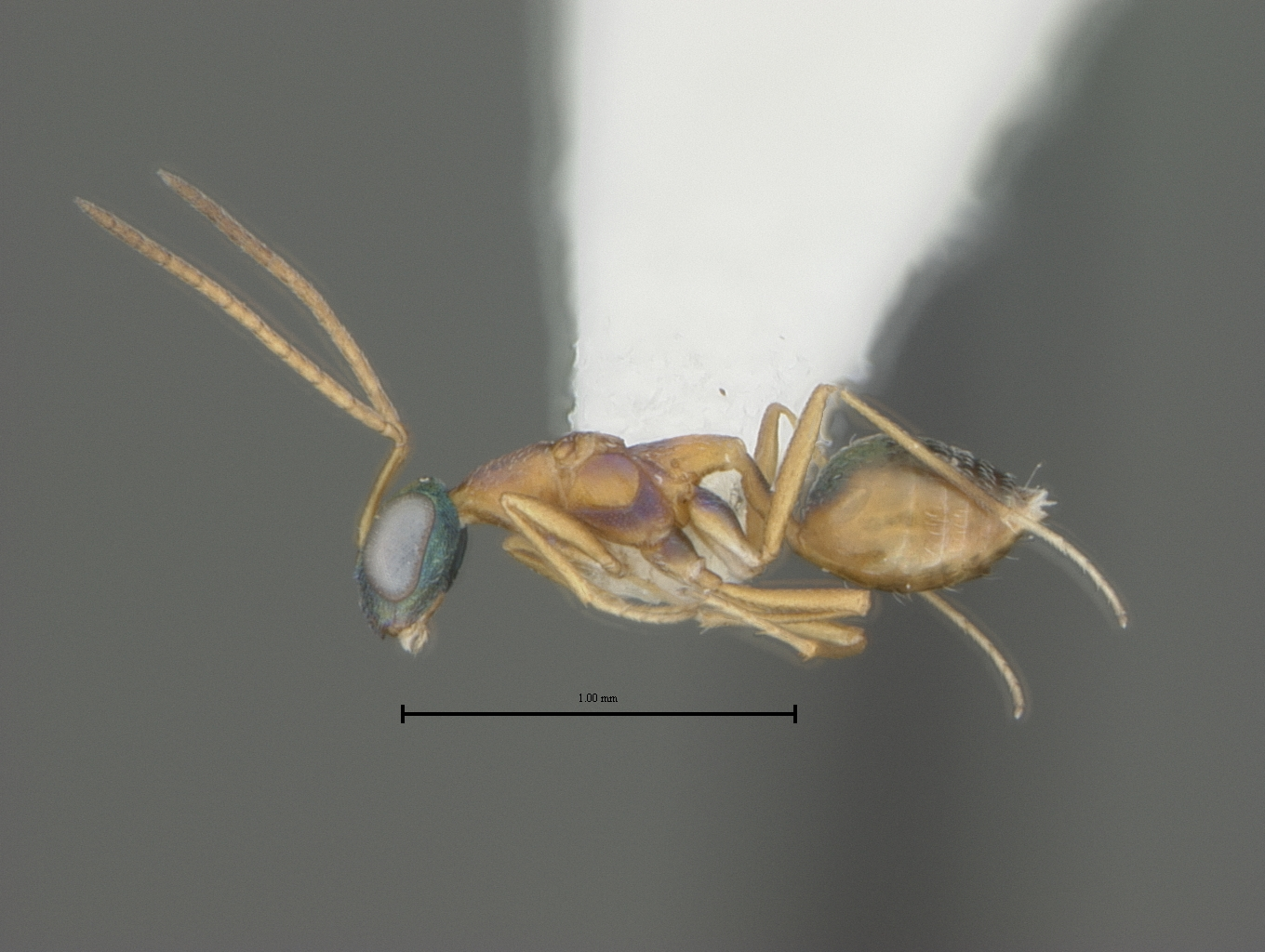
- Myrmicolelaps aurantius

Scientific classification
- Domain: Eukaryota
- Kingdom: Animalia
- Phylum: Arthropoda
- Class: Insecta
- Order: Hymenoptera
- Superfamily: Chalcidoidea
- Family: Diparidae; Thomson, 1876

Genera
- See text.

= Diparidae =

Family of wasps

Diparidae is a family of chalcid wasps. This group was formerly treated as Diparinae, a subfamily of Pteromalidae.

Most diparids are collected from leaf litter in forests, where they are known to parasitise weevils, although diparids have been known to emerge from mantid egg cases and fly pupae. They are found almost worldwide, but appear to have Gondwanan roots, with most diversity (at genus level) in South Africa and Australia.

== Description ==
Diparids often exhibit marked sexual dimorphism. Most known males have wings (they are macropterous), have filiform antennae, and males of different genera appear morphologically similar. Females, however, show far more morphological variation; they may be macropterous, brachypterous (reduced wings), or apterous (wingless), and often have clavate antennae.

Distinguishing features include: Antenna with 12 flagellomeres, including a small fourth clavomere; The labrum is flexible, subrectangular, and hidden behind the clypeus; labrum with a row of marginal setae; Mandibles have three or four teeth; All legs have five tarsomeres.

== Genera ==
Diparidae consists of 11 genera:

- Cerodipara
- Chimaerolelaps
- Conodipara
- Conophorisca
- Dipara
- Diparisca
- Dozodipara
- Hedgvistina
- Lelaps
- Myrmicolelaps
- Netomocera
