= Holopsenellidae =

Holopsenellidae Temporal range: Cretaceous

Scientific classification
- Kingdom: Animalia
- Phylum: Arthropoda
- Clade: Pancrustacea
- Class: Insecta
- Order: Hymenoptera
- Suborder: Apocrita
- Infraorder: Aculeata
- Family: †Holopsenellidae; Engel, Ortega-Blanco & Azevedo, 2016

Type genus
- †Holopsenella Engel et al. 2016

Genera
- †Holopsenella Engel et al., 2016; †Typhopsenella Lepeco & Melo, 2025

Diversity
- 2 genera

Extinct family of wasps

†Holopsenellidae is an extinct family of wasps in the infraorder Aculeata. Specimens have been found in Burmese and Lebanese amber from the Cretaceous period.

== Taxonomy ==
†Holopsenellidae was considered to be a subfamily within Bethylidae by its original authors. However, a later study found that the venation of the hind wing was more complete, which corresponds more with Plumariidae, and that the members of †Holopsenella, the type genus which all other genera in the subfamily must be compared to, lack key diagnostic features of Bethylidae. This means that the only genus left in the family was †Holopsenella. The authors also found no solid evidence to place Holopsenellidae in any lower taxon than Aculeata. The other genera that were previously included in Holopsenellidae (†Cretabythus, †Holopsenelliscus and †Megalopsenella) did show the diagnostic features of Bethylidae, and are therefore still considered to be in Bethylidae, but had not yet been assigned to any subfamilies as of 2022. In 2025, a second genus was described, †Typhopsenella, but no updates were made to the taxonomic placement of †Holopsenellidae.

== Etymology ==
The name of the family stems from the name of the type genus, †Holopsenella. This name is composed of two parts. The first is holos, which in Greek means "complete," and the second is psen, which means "wasp". The Latin diminutive psenella is also found in the names of the primitive genera Lytopsenella and Eupsenella.
