= Embolemopsis =

Embolemopsis Temporal range: Early Cretaceous, Barremian–Aptian

Scientific classification
- Kingdom: Animalia
- Phylum: Arthropoda
- Class: Insecta
- Order: Hymenoptera
- Family: Embolemidae
- Genus: †Embolemopsis; Olmi et al., 2010

Type species
- †Embolemopsis baissensis Olmi et al., 2010

Other species
- †E. maryannae Olmi et al., 2020

Extinct genus of wasps

Embolemopsis is an extinct genus of wasps belonging to the family Embolemidae. Two species are known: the type species, E. baissensis from the Aptian Zaza Formation of Russia, and E. maryannae from the Barremian Wessex Formation of England.

== Discovery and naming ==
The holotype of E. baissensis, PIN 4210/7295, was discovered in Baissa, Russia within an outcrop of the Zaza Formation and was named described by Olmi et al. (2010) within a revision of the Dryinidae and Embolemidae.

The holotype, and only specimen, of E. maryannae was discovered in Chilton Chine, England in the L6 plant debris bed of the Wealden Formation, and before being named, E. maryannae was previously described as a member of the Dryinidae in a conference abstract by Jarzembowski (2015). Between 2017 and 2019, E. maryannae was classified instead as a member of the Embolemidae, and was named by Olmi et al. (2020) alongside six other extinct members of the Embolemidae. It was named in honour of Mary Anning.

== Description ==
E. baissensis grew to around 2.60 millimetres (0.102 in) long.

== Classification ==
Jarzembowski (2015) classified E. maryannae within Dryinidae, and Olmi et al. (2020) later placed both species of Embolemopsis within Embolemidae.
