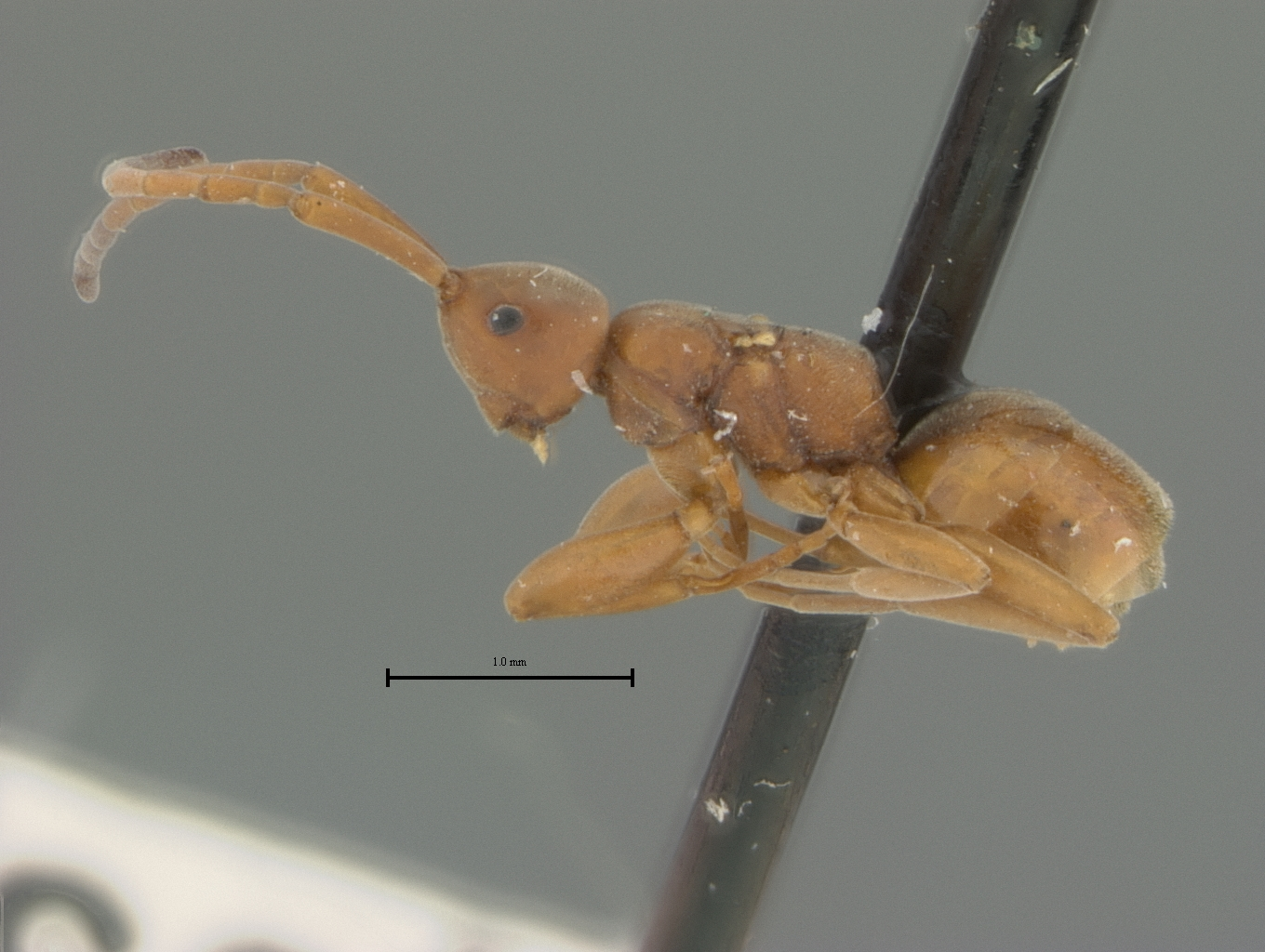
- Embolemus nearcticus

Scientific classification
- Kingdom: Animalia
- Phylum: Arthropoda
- Class: Insecta
- Order: Hymenoptera
- Superfamily: Chrysidoidea
- Family: Embolemidae; Förster, 1856

Genera
- †Baissobius Rasnitsyn, 1975; †Cretembolemus Omni et al., 2014; †Embolemopsis Omni et al., 2010; Embolemus Westwood, 1833; †Ponomarenkoa Omni, 2010; Trogloembolemus Omni et al., 2014

= Embolemidae =

Embolemidae Temporal range: Barremian–Recent

Family of wasps

Embolemidae is a family of small solitary parasitoid wasps with around 70 species in 2 genera distributed around the world. The few species whose biology is known are parasites on planthopper nymphs of the families Achilidae and Cixiidae. There is debate regarding the status of the genus named Ampulicomorpha by Ashmead in 1893, generally considered now to be a junior synonym of Embolemus (e.g.,), though some authorities dispute this (e.g.,)

== Biology ==
Females are wingless while males have wings, and in temperate regions emerge later than the females, which overwinter as adults. The wingless females have been recorded from the nests of ants and small mammal burrows, or under stones in pastures and grasslands, and they appear to be ant mimics. A Palearctic species, Embolemus ruddii, has been found in association with the ant species Formica fusca and Lasius flavus, while in Japan, Embolemus walkeri was taken in a nest of another ant, from the genus Myrmica. A Nearctic species, Embolemus confusus, has been reared from nymphs of a planthopper in the family Achilidae, where the host fed on fungi beneath the bark of rotting logs. The wasp larva lives in a bulging sac attached to the host nymph between the second and third segments.

== Fossil species ==
After

- †Baissobius Rasnitsyn 1975
  - †Baissobius carolianus Rasnitsyn 1996 Dzun-Bain Formation, Mongolia, Early Cretaceous (Aptian)
  - †Baissobius minimus Rasnitsyn 1996 Zaza Formation, Russia, Aptian
  - †Baissobius minutus Olmi et al. 2010 Zaza Formation, Russia, Aptian
  - †Baissobius parvus Rasnitsyn 1975 Zaza Formation, Russia, Aptian
- †Cretembolemus Olmi et al. 2014
  - †Cretembolemus orapensis Olmi et al. 2014 Orapa, Botswana, Late Cretaceous (Turonian)
- †Embolemopsis Olmi et al. 2010
  - †Embolemopsis baissensis Olmi et al. 2010 Zaza Formation, Russia, Aptian
  - †Embolemopsis maryannae Olmi, Jarzembowski, Capradossi and Perkovsky, 2020 Wessex Formation, United Kingdom, Early Cretaceous (Barremian)
- Embolemus Westwood 1833 (incl. Ampulicomorpha Ashmead, 1893)
  - †Embolemus antiquus Perkovsky et al., 2021 Burmese amber, Myanmar, Late Cretaceous (Cenomanian)
  - †Embolemus brachypterus Olmi et al., 2021 Burmese amber, Myanmar, Cenomanian
  - †Embolemus burmensis Perkovsky et al., 2021 Burmese amber, Myanmar, Cenomanian
  - †Embolemus cretacicus Perkovsky et al., 2021 Burmese amber, Myanmar, Cenomanian
  - †Embolemus excitus Perrichot and Engel 2011 Baltic amber, Eocene
  - †Embolemus janzeni (Olmi et al., 2014) Burmese amber, Myanmar, Cenomanian
  - †Embolemus micropterus Olmi et al., 2021 Burmese amber, Myanmar, Cenomanian
  - †Embolemus ohmkuhnlei Perkovsky et al., 2021 Burmese amber, Myanmar, Cenomanian
  - †Embolemus perialla (Ortega-Blanco et al., 2011) Spanish amber, Early Cretaceous (Albian)
  - †Embolemus quesnoyensis (Chény, Guillam, Nel and Perrichot, 2020) Oise amber, France, Eocene (Ypresian)
  - †Embolemus succinalis (Brues, 1933) Baltic amber, Rovno amber, Eocene
  - †Embolemus zherikhini Perkovsky et al., 2021 Burmese amber, Myanmar, Cenomanian
- †Ponomarenkoa Olmi 2010
  - †Ponomarenkoa burmensis Perkovsky et al., 2021 Burmese amber, Myanmar, Cenomanian
  - †Ponomarenkoa ellenbergeri Olmi et al. 2013 Burmese amber, Myanmar, Cenomanian
  - †Ponomarenkoa polonica Ponomarenko 1988 Baltic amber, Eocene
