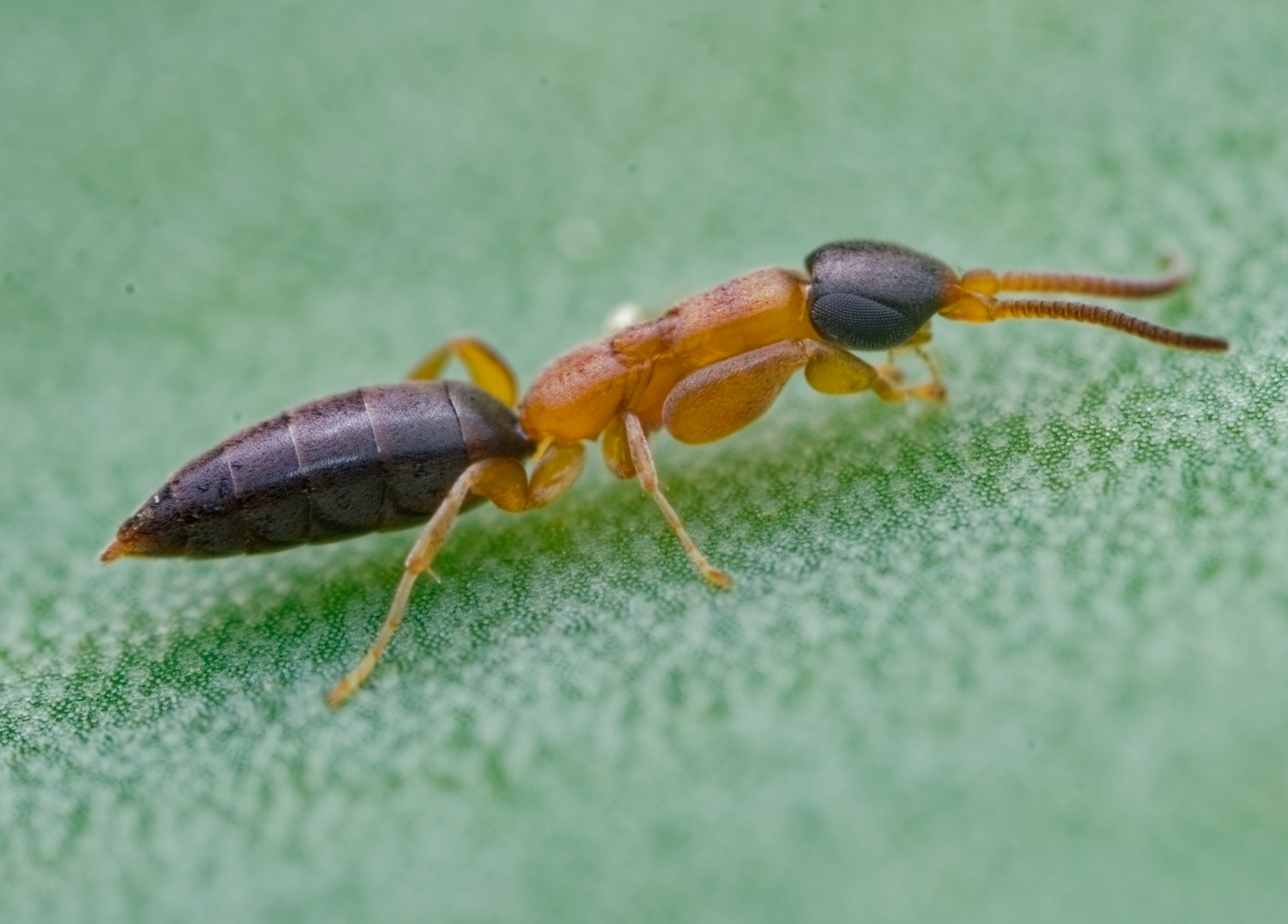

Scientific classification
- Kingdom: Animalia
- Phylum: Arthropoda
- Class: Insecta
- Order: Hymenoptera
- Family: Sclerogibbidae
- Genus: Sclerogibba
- Species: S. vagabunda

Binomial name
- Sclerogibba vagabunda (Bridwell, 1919)

= Sclerogibba vagabunda =

Species of wasp

Sclerogibba vagabunda is a species of wasp in the genus Sclerogibba. It is endemic to Africa, but has been introduced to Hawaiʻi.
