= Typhopsenella =

Typhopsenella Temporal range: Cretaceous

Scientific classification
- Kingdom: Animalia
- Phylum: Arthropoda
- Class: Insecta
- Order: Hymenoptera
- Family: †Holopsenellidae
- Genus: †Typhopsenella; Lepeco & Melo, 2025
- Species: †T. obscura

Binomial name
- †Typhopsenella obscura Lepeco & Melo, 2025

Extinct genus of wasp in the family Holopsenellidae

†Typhopsenella is an extinct monotypic genus of wasp in the family †Holopsenellidae. The only species in the genus is †Typhopsenella obscura found in Burmese amber from the Cretaceous period. Only one specimen, a female, is known and it was approximately 9.8 mm in body length.

== Etymology ==
The name of the genus is a combination of "Typhon", a large monster in Greek mythology and "psenella" which is a Latin diminutive of "psen", which means wasp. It refers to the larger size compared to other members of †Holopsenellidae. The Latin diminutive "psenella" is also found in other generic names such as †Holopsennella and two genera that were previously considered to be closely related to †Typhopsenella, which are Lytopsenella and Eupsenella. The specific epithet is derived from the Latin word for "dark" and also alludes to the specimen being obscured by debris (syninclusions) in the amber.
