= Holopsenella =

Holopsenella Temporal range: Cretaceous

Scientific classification
- Kingdom: Animalia
- Phylum: Arthropoda
- Class: Insecta
- Order: Hymenoptera
- Family: †Holopsenellidae
- Genus: †Holopsenella; Engel et al., 2016

Type species
- †Holopsenella primotica Engel et al., 2016

Diversity
- 4 species

Extinct genus of wasps

†Holopsenella is an extinct genus of wasp in the family †Holopsenellidae. Specimens have been found in Burmese and Lebanese amber.

== Etymology ==
The name is composed of two parts. The first is holos, which in Greek means "complete", and the second is psen, which means "wasp". The Latin diminutive psenella is also found in the names of the primitive genera that were previously considered to be closely related to †Holopsenella, such as Lytopsenella and Eupsenella.

== Species ==
As of January 2026, the following four species belong to the genus:

- †Holopsenella antiqua Lepeco & Melo, 2022
- †Holopsenella burmitica Lepeco & Melo, 2022
- †Holopsenella gothica Lepeco & Melo, 2022
- †Holopsenella primotica Engel et al., 2016
