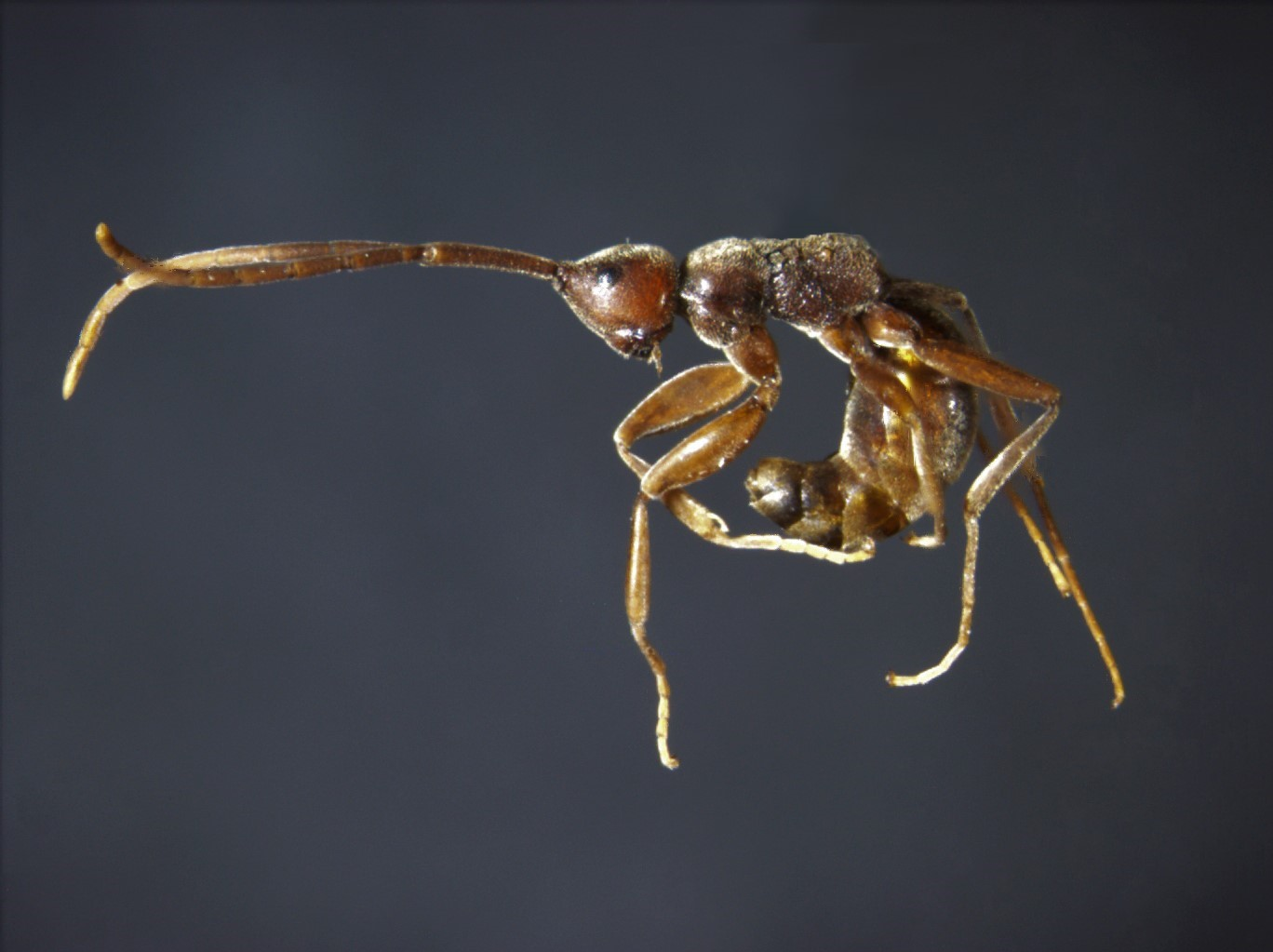
- Female

Scientific classification
- Domain: Eukaryota
- Kingdom: Animalia
- Phylum: Arthropoda
- Class: Insecta
- Order: Hymenoptera
- Family: Embolemidae
- Genus: Embolemus
- Species: E. ruddii

Binomial name
- Embolemus ruddii Westwood, 1833

= Embolemus ruddii =

Species of wasp

Embolemus ruddii is a small aculeate wasp in the family Embolemidae.

== Biology ==
Females are apterous whilst males are winged. It is a widespread, yet rarely recorded palearctic species. They are believed to parasitise tree root-feeding planthoppers in the family Cixiidae.
