= Scolebythidae =

Scolebythidae Temporal range: Barremian–Recent

Scientific classification
- Kingdom: Animalia
- Phylum: Arthropoda
- Class: Insecta
- Order: Hymenoptera
- Infraorder: Aculeata
- Superfamily: Chrysidoidea
- Family: Scolebythidae; Evans 1963

Genera
- See text

Family of wasps

The Scolebythidae are a small family of aculeate wasps in the superfamily Chrysidoidea. These chrysidoid wasps are found in Africa, Australia, the Neotropics, north China, Thailand and Fiji. They are parasites on larvae of Cerambycidae and Ptinidae.

== Overview ==
Scolebythidae wasps are gregarious ectoparasitoids of wood-boring beetle larvae. Females dig tunnels through the frass of wood-boring beetles using their mandibles. After reaching the host chamber of the beetle larva, frass is pulled into the chamber before stinging the larva. The female wasp feeds on the hemolymph after biting the integument. This behaviour is probably necessary for egg laying.

== Taxonomy ==
- Subfamily Pristapenesiinae Engel et al. 2013
  - †Boreobythus Engel and Grimaldi 2007 New Jersey amber, Turonian
  - †Ectenobythus Engel et al. 2013 Spanish amber, Albian
  - †Eobythus Lacau et al. 2000 Oise amber, France, Ypresian
  - †Libanobythus Prentice and Poinar 1996 Lebanese amber, Barremian
  - †Mirabythus Cai et al. 2012 Yixian Formation, China, Aptian
  - †Nadezhdabythus Zhang, Rasnitsyn, Olmi, Martynova & Perkovsky, 2020 Burmese amber, Myanmar, Cenomanian
  - †Necrobythus Engel et al. 2013 Canadian amber, Campanian
  - Pristapenesia Brues 1933 South America and Asia
  - †Sphakelobythus Engel et al. 2013 Canadian amber, Campanian
  - †Uliobythus Engel and Grimaldi 2007 Lebanese amber, Barremian
  - †Zapenesia Engel and Grimaldi 2007 Lebanese amber, Barremian
  - †Cursoribythus and †Siccibythus from the Burmese amber were originally assigned to this family, but have subsequently been assigned to the Falsiformicidae.
- Subfamily Scolebythinae Evans 1963
  - Clystopsenella Kieffer 1911
  - Scolebythus Evans 1963
- Ycaploca Nagy, 1975, South Africa, Australia
