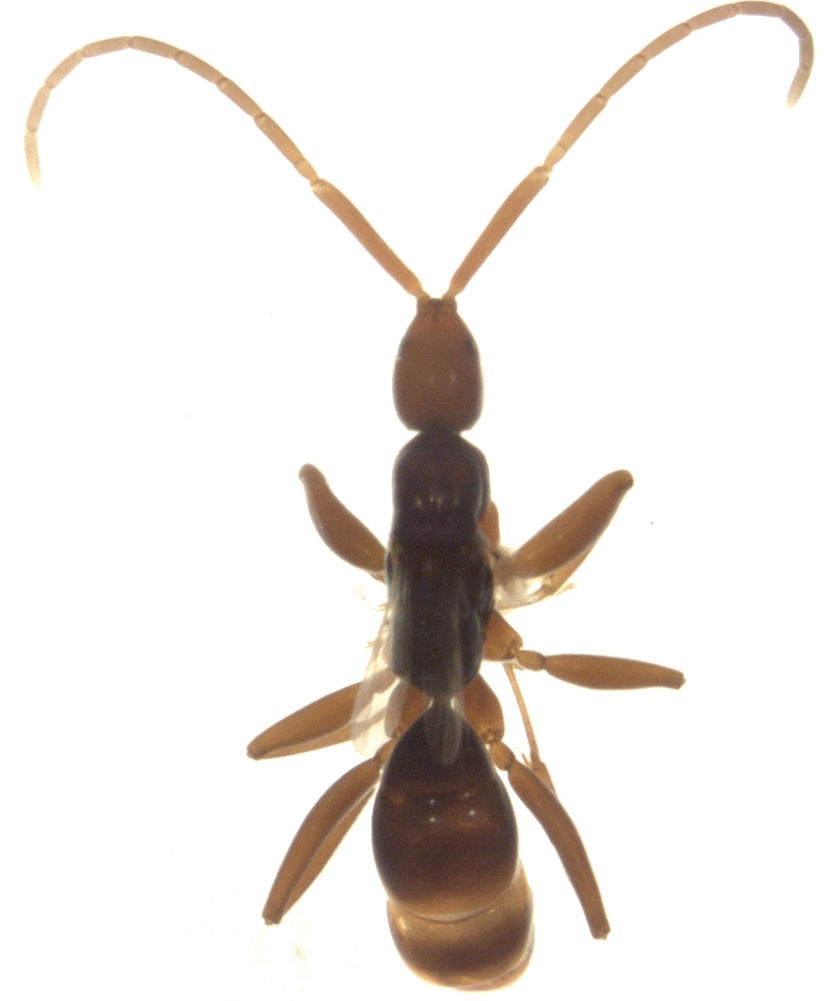
- Embolemus zealandicus

Scientific classification
- Kingdom: Animalia
- Phylum: Arthropoda
- Class: Insecta
- Order: Hymenoptera
- Family: Embolemidae
- Genus: Embolemus; Westwood, 1833

Synonyms
- Myrmecomorphus Westwood, 1833; Polyplanus Nees, 1834; Embolimus Agassiz, 1846 (Emend.); Formila de Romand, 1846; Pedinomma Förster, 1856; Ampulicomorpha Ashmead, 1893; Ampulicimorpha Brues, 1933 (missp.)

= Embolemus =

Genus of wasps

Embolemus is a genus of wasps belonging to the family Embolemidae. There is debate regarding the status of the genus named Ampulicomorpha by Ashmead in 1893, generally considered now to be a junior synonym of Embolemus (e.g.,), as a few authorities dispute this (e.g.,).

The genus has cosmopolitan distribution.

== Species ==
=== Extant ===
- Embolemus africanus (Risbec, 1957)
- Embolemus ambrensis Olmi, 2004
- Embolemus andersoni Olmi, 1998
- Embolemus angustipennis (Kieffer, 1912)
- Embolemus apertus Azevedo & Amarante, 2005
- Embolemus australis (Olmi, 1996)
- Embolemus bestelmeyeri Olmi, 1997
- Embolemus boraceia Amarante, Brandão & Carpenter, 1999
- Embolemus brandaoi Azevedo & Amarante, 2005
- Embolemus brothersi Olmi, 2006
- Embolemus burundensis Olmi, 2011
- Embolemus capensis Olmi, 1998
- Embolemus collinsi (Olmi, 1996)
- Embolemus confusus (Ashmead, 1893)
- Embolemus dayi (Guglielmino & Olmi, 2014)
- Embolemus fisheri Olmi, 2010
- Embolemus gabonensis Olmi, 2004
- Embolemus gilli (Olmi, 1998)
- Embolemus gressitti (Olmi, 1998)
- Embolemus hachijoensis Hirashima & Yamagishi, 1975
- Embolemus harteni Olmi, 1997
- Embolemus honshuensis Olmi, Mita & Guglielmino, 2014
- Embolemus huberi Olmi, 1997
- Embolemus irwini (Guglielmino & Olmi, 2014)
- Embolemus kheeli Olmi, 2004
- Embolemus krombeini Olmi, 1996
- Embolemus latus Azevedo & Amarante, 2005
- Embolemus magnus (Olmi, 1996)
- Embolemus nearcticus (Brues, 1922)
- Embolemus neotropicus Olmi, 1996
- Embolemus nepalensis (Olmi, 1998)
- Embolemus niger van Achterberg, 2000
- Embolemus notogeicus Olmi, 1996
- Embolemus ogloblini Olmi, 1998
- Embolemus olmii van Achterberg & van Kats, 2000
- Embolemus pecki Olmi, 1998
- Embolemus poirieri (Olmi, Capradossi & Guglielmino, 2019)
- Embolemus reticulatus van Achterberg, 2000
- Embolemus ruddii Westwood, 1833
- Embolemus sanbornei Olmi, 1997
- Embolemus schajovskoyi (De Santis & Vidal, 1977)
- Embolemus sensitivus Xu, Olmi & Guglielmino, 2012
- Embolemus stangei Olmi, 1996
- Embolemus suavis (Olmi, 1998)
- Embolemus subtilis Olmi, 1996
- Embolemus tauricus Olmi, Belokobylskij & Guglielmino, 2014
- Embolemus viator (Olmi, 2017)
- Embolemus villemantae Contarini, Olmi, Capradossi & Guglielmino, 2020
- Embolemus walkeri Richards, 1951
- Embolemus wilhelmensis Olmi, Marletta & Guglielmino, 2016
- Embolemus wilkersoni (Olmi, 1998)
- Embolemus zealandicus Olmi, 1966

=== Extinct ===
- †Embolemus antiquus Perkovsky et al., 2021 Burmese amber, Myanmar, Cenomanian
- †Embolemus brachypterus Olmi et al., 2021 Burmese amber, Myanmar, Cenomanian
- †Embolemus breviscapus (Brues, 1922) Baltic amber, Eocene
- †Embolemus burmensis Perkovsky et al., 2021 Burmese amber, Myanmar, Cenomanian
- †Embolemus cretacicus Perkovsky et al., 2021 Burmese amber, Myanmar, Cenomanian
- †Embolemus excitus Perrichot & Engel 2011 Baltic amber, Eocene
- †Embolemus janzeni (Olmi et al., 2014) Burmese amber, Myanmar, Cenomanian
- †Embolemus micropterus Olmi et al., 2021 Burmese amber, Myanmar, Cenomanian
- †Embolemus ohmkuhnlei Perkovsky et al., 2021 Burmese amber, Myanmar, Cenomanian
- †Embolemus perialla (Ortega-Blanco et al., 2011) Spanish amber, Albian
- †Embolemus quesnoyensis (Chény, Guillam, Nel & Perrichot, 2020) Oise amber, France, Ypresian
- †Embolemus succinalis (Brues, 1933) Baltic amber, Rovno amber, Eocene
- †Embolemus zherikhini Perkovsky et al., 2021 Burmese amber, Myanmar, Cenomanian
