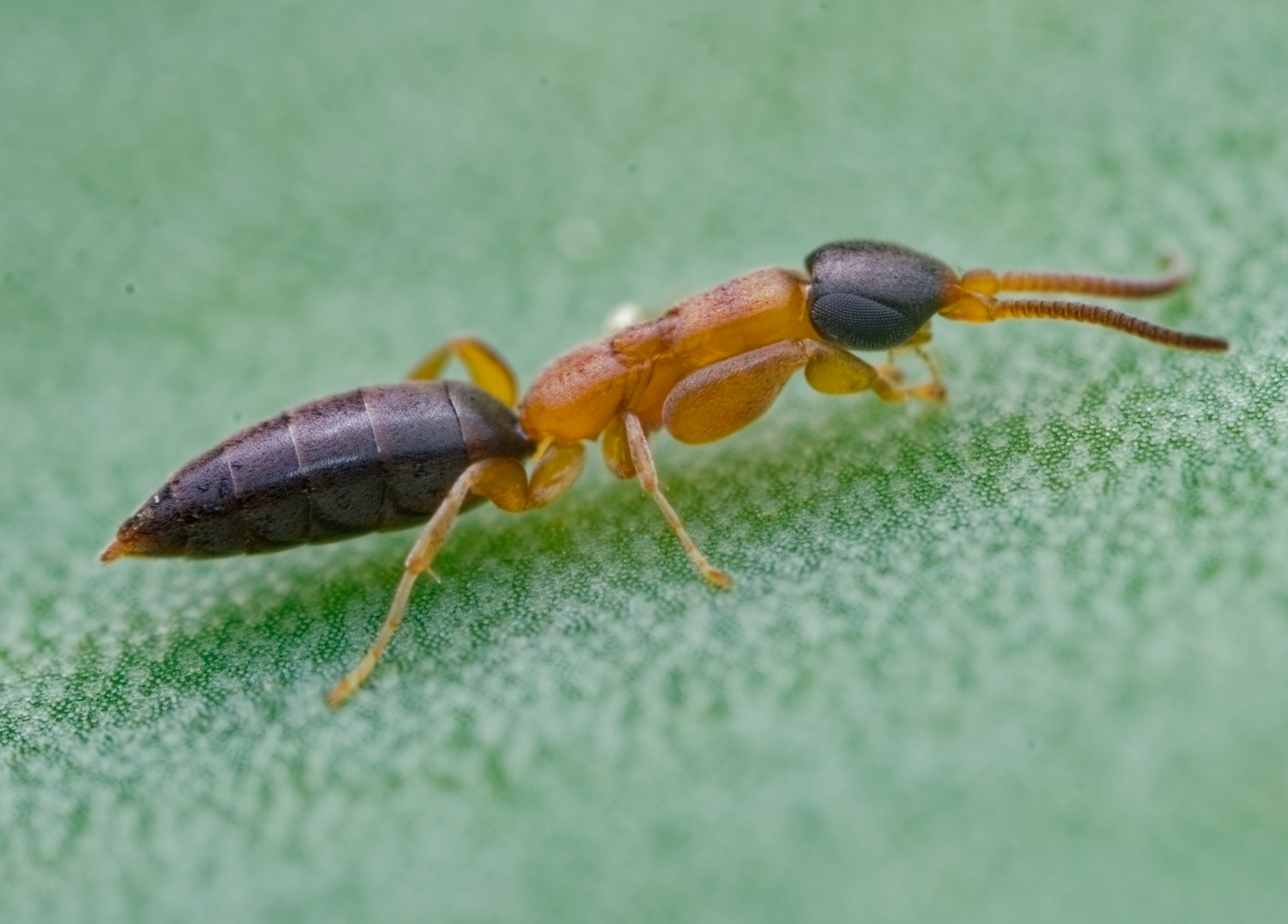
- Sclerogibba vagabunda

Scientific classification
- Kingdom: Animalia
- Phylum: Arthropoda
- Class: Insecta
- Order: Hymenoptera
- Family: Sclerogibbidae
- Genus: Sclerogibba; Riggio & De Stefani-Perez, 1888

Type species
- Sclerogibba crassifemorata Riggio & De Stefani-Perez, 1888

= Sclerogibba =

Genus of wasps

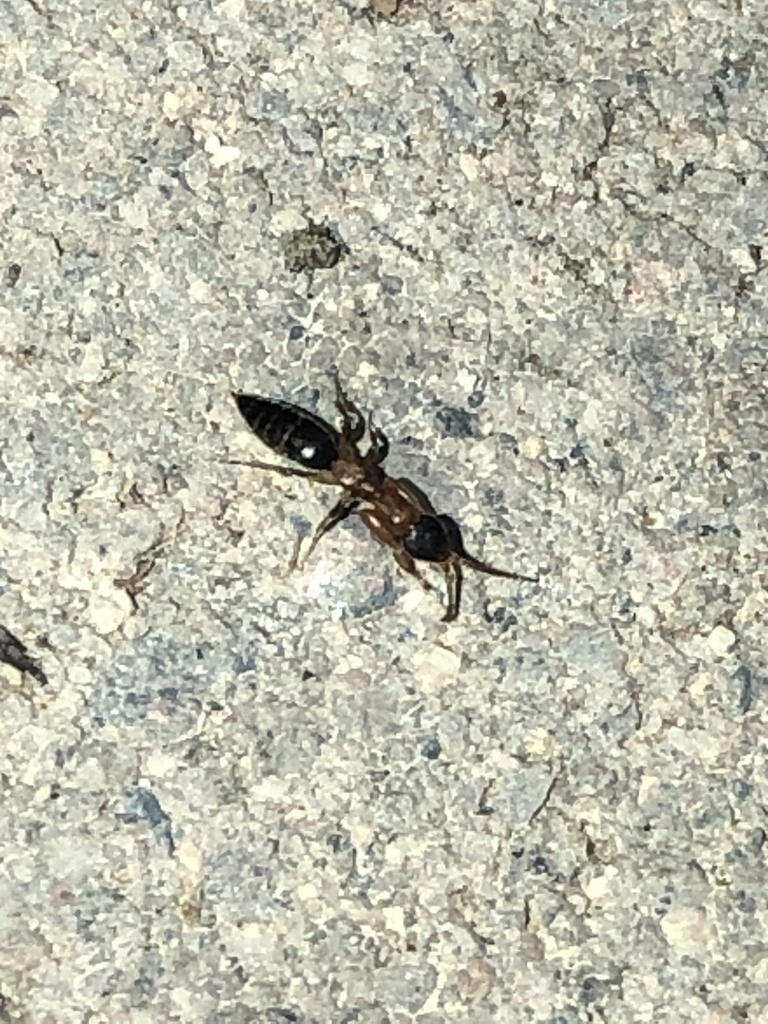
a sclerogibba wasp crawling on concrete

Sclerogibba is a genus of wasps in the family Sclerogibbidae. The females of this genus are wingless.

== Species ==
- Sclerogibba africana Kieffer, 1904
- Sclerogibba algerica Benoit, 1963
- Sclerogibba berlandi Benoit, 1963
- Sclerogibba crassifemorata Riggio Stefani-Perez, 1888
- Sclerogibba impressa Olmi, 2005
- Sclerogibba madegassa Benoit, 1952
- Sclerogibba magrettii Kieffer, 1913
- Sclerogibba mancinii Masi, 1933
- Sclerogibba rapax Olmi, 2005
- Sclerogibba rossi Olmi, 2005
- Sclerogibba rufithorax Cameron, 1904
- Sclerogibba talpiformi Benoit, 1950
- Sclerogibba transitori Dessart, 1982
- Sclerogibba turneri Richards, 1939
- Sclerogibba vagabunda Bridwell, 1919
