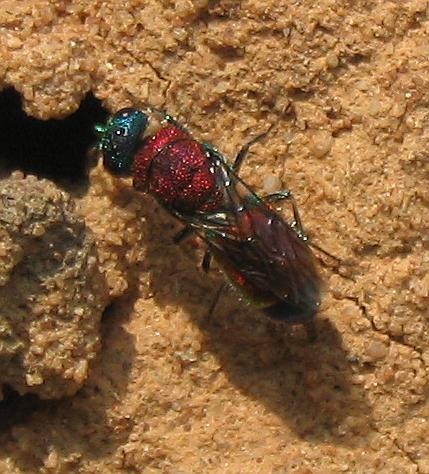
- Chrysis viridula

Scientific classification
- Kingdom: Animalia
- Phylum: Arthropoda
- Clade: Pancrustacea
- Class: Insecta
- Order: Hymenoptera
- Suborder: Apocrita
- Infraorder: Aculeata
- Superfamily: Chrysidoidea; Latreille, 1802

Families
- Bethylidae; Chrysididae; †Chaetochrysididae; Dryinidae; Embolemidae; †Falsiformicidae; †Plumalexiidae; Plumariidae; †Radiophronidae; Sclerogibbidae; Scolebythidae; †Sirenobethylidae

= Chrysidoidea =

Chrysidoidea Temporal range: Barremian–recent

Superfamily of insects

The superfamily Chrysidoidea is a very large cosmopolitan group, all of which are parasitoids or cleptoparasites of other insects. There are three large, common families (Bethylidae, Chrysididae, and Dryinidae) and four small, rare families (Embolemidae, Plumariidae, Sclerogibbidae, and Scolebythidae). This superfamily is traditionally considered to be the basal taxon within the Aculeata, and, as such, only a few species can sting. Most wasps in the family are under 3mm in length.

Members of the families Dryinidae and Embolemidae are the only parasitoids among the Hymenoptera to have a life cycle in which the wasp larva begins its life inside the body of the host, and then later forms a sac (called a thylacium) that protrudes out of the host's abdomen. The closely related family Sclerogibbidae contains more traditional ectoparasitoids, attacking the nymphs and adults of webspinners.

The extinct, monotypic family Plumalexiidae was described in 2011 from fossils preserved in Turonian age New Jersey amber.
