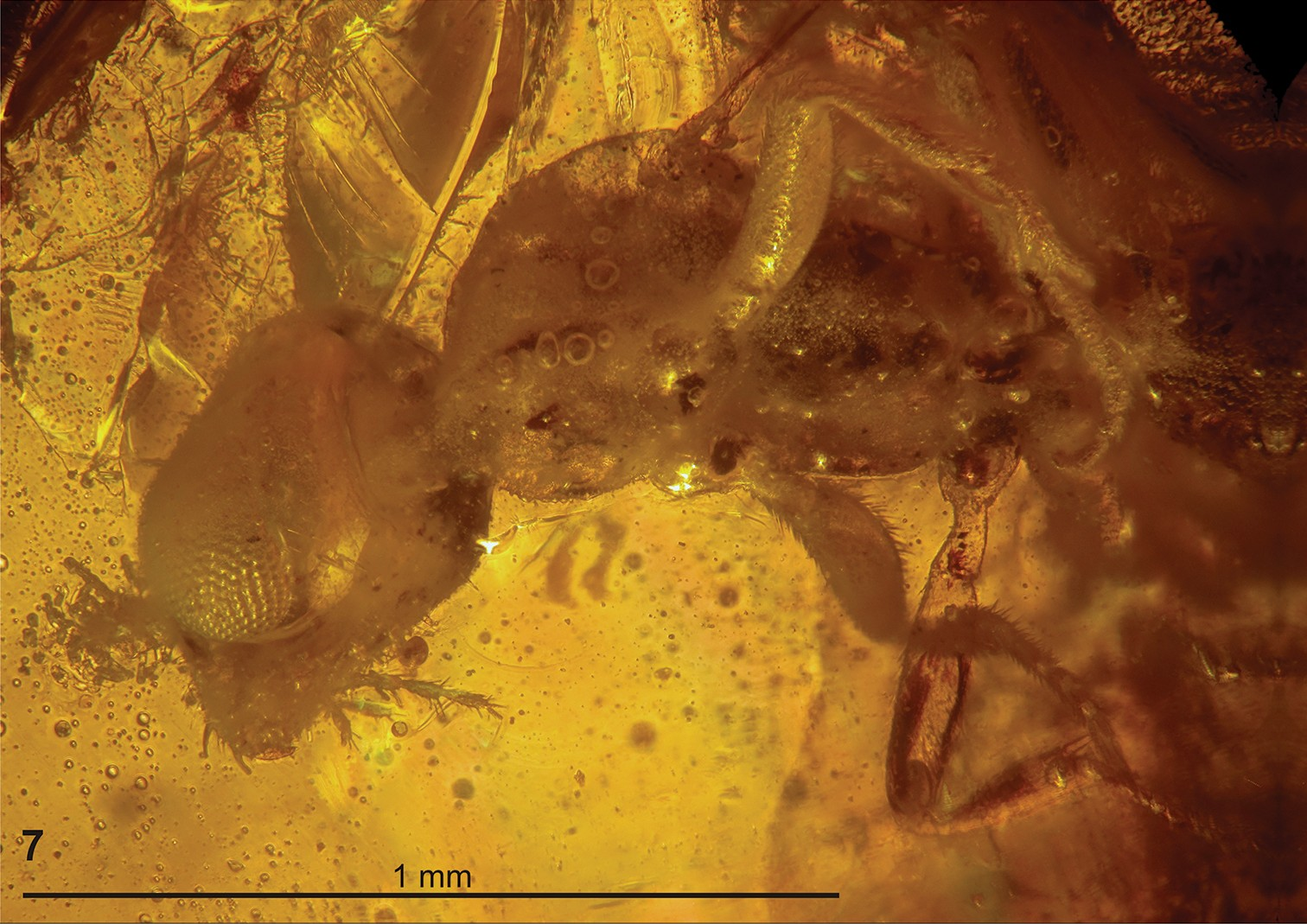
- Plumalexius rasnitsyni holotype

Scientific classification
- Kingdom: Animalia
- Phylum: Arthropoda
- Class: Insecta
- Order: Hymenoptera
- Family: †Plumalexiidae
- Genus: †Plumalexius; Brothers, 2011

Type species
- Plumalexius rasnitsyni Brothers, 2011

Other species
- P. ohmkuhnlei Rasnitsyn and Brothers, 2020

= Plumalexius =

Plumalexius Temporal range: Cenomanian–Turonian

Extinct genus of insects

Plumalexius is a genus of wasps in the extinct monotypic family Plumalexiidae, containing two species: the type species Plumalexius rasnitsyni, known from the Late Cretaceous White Oaks Pit in Sayreville, New Jersey, and Plumalexius ohmkuhnlei, known from the Cretaceous Burmese amber.

== History and classification ==
Plumalexius rasnitsyni is known from only two fossils, the holotype, specimen "AMNH no. NJ-695" and the paratype, specimen "AMNH no. NJ-175". The specimens are both fairly complete male specimens which are preserved as inclusions in blocks of heavily fractured yellowish amber. The fossils were recovered in 1995 from outcrops of Turonian age strata in the White Oaks Pit, Middlesex County, New Jersey by Paul Nascimbene and subsequently embedded in blocks of epoxy. The type specimens are currently preserved in the paleoentomology collections housed in the American Museum of Natural History, located in Manhattan, New York City, US. The two specimens were examined by Alexandr P. Rasnitsyn, who identified them as belonging to the chrysidoid family Plumariidae. Plumalexius was first fully studied by Denis J. Brothers of the University of KwaZulu-Natal, Pietermaritzburg, South Africa. Brothers 2011 type description of the family, genus, and species was published online and in print in the journal ZooKeys. The generic name was coined by Brothers from a combination of the family name "Plumariidae", in recognition of the original identification of the fossils, and the name "Alexandr" in honor of Alexandr Rasnitsyn. The family name Plumalexiidae is a derivation of genus name, while the etymology of the specific epithet rasnitsyni is a derivation of Alexandr Rasnitsyn's last name.

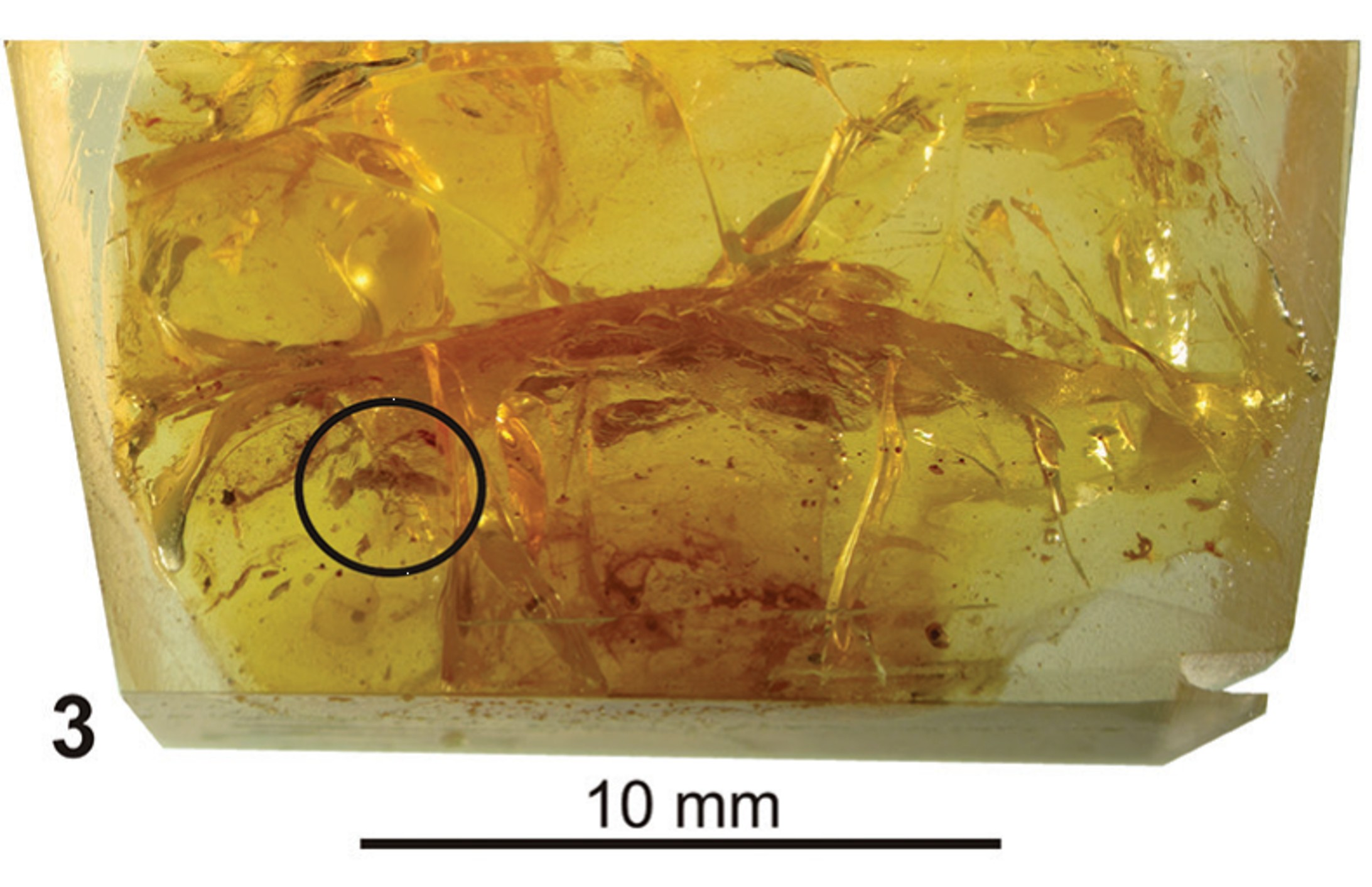
New Jersey amber containing specimens of Plumalexius rasnitsyni

Based on the phylogenetic analysis that were run by Brothers Plumalexius is a basal genus in the evolution of the family Plumariidae, however the genus does not display the apomorphies that are key for Plumariidae. Due to the lack of shared apomorphies between Plumariidae and Plumalexius Brothers erected a separate family for Plumalexius.

== Description ==
The Plumalexius specimens are both well-preserved mostly complete adult males. The overall length as preserved for the larger male is 2.37 millimetres (0.093 in), with approximately 1.47 millimetres (0.058 in) fore-wings and 1.17 millimetres (0.046 in) hind-wings. The overall coloration of the males is a uniform yellowish to reddish tone, with the wing veins bring a slightly darker tone.
