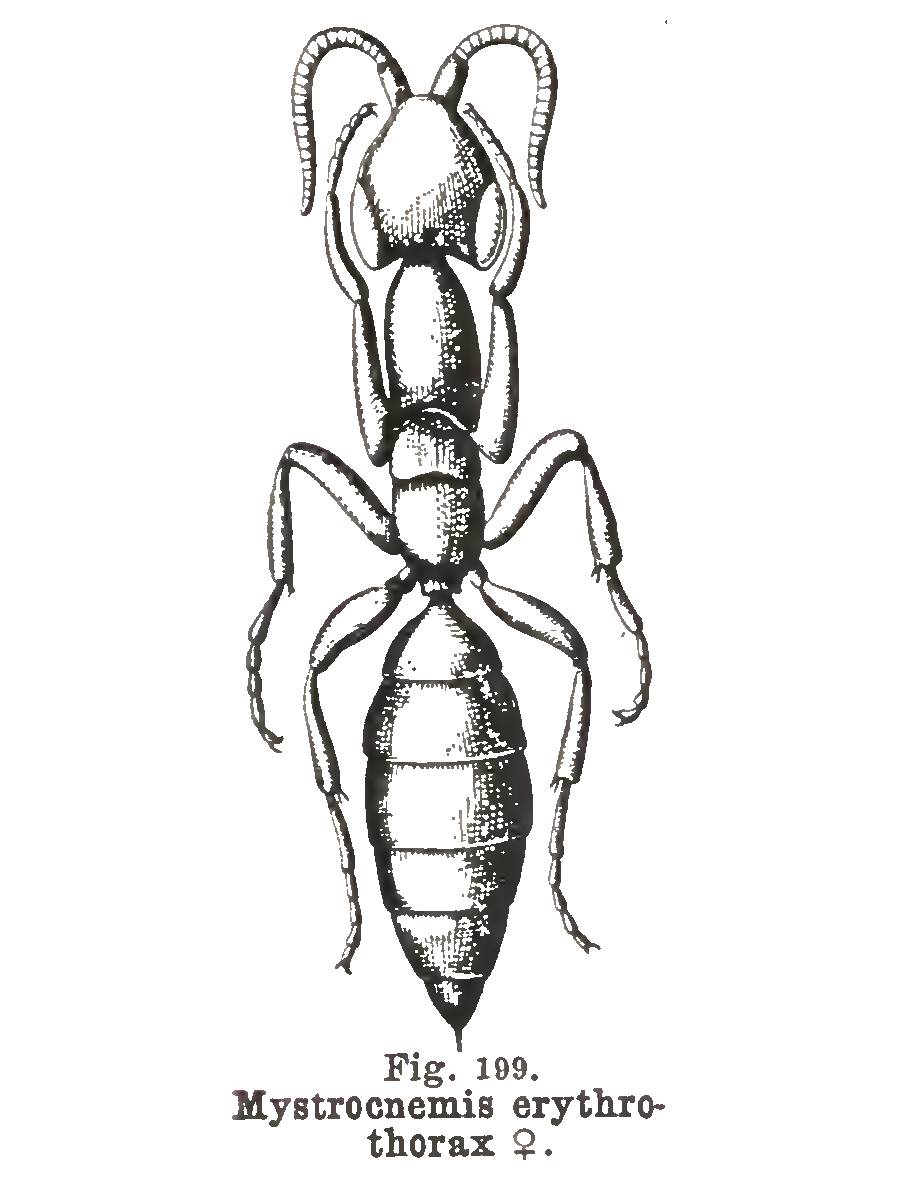

Scientific classification
- Kingdom: Animalia
- Phylum: Arthropoda
- Clade: Pancrustacea
- Class: Insecta
- Order: Hymenoptera
- Superfamily: Chrysidoidea
- Family: Sclerogibbidae; Ashmead 1902

Genera
- See text

= Sclerogibbidae =

Sclerogibbidae Temporal range: Barremian–Recent

Family of wasps

The Sclerogibbidae are a small family of aculeate wasps in the superfamily Chrysidoidea.

== Overview ==
Sclerogibbidae are ectoparasitoids of Embioptera. The female wasp oviposits an egg on the abdomen of a host. Once the larva emerges, it attaches itself to its host. After the host is consumed, the larva detaches itself from the carcass and spins a cocoon. While in all modern species, females are wingless (apterous), this is not true for fossil species.

The currently recognised taxa within the family Sclerogibbidae are:

- subfamily †Sclerogibbodinae
  - genus †Sclerogibbodes Engel & Grimaldi, 2006a Lebanese amber, Barremian
- subfamily Sclerogibbinae
  - genus Caenosclerogibba Yasumatsu, 1958
  - genus Probethylus Ashmead, 1902
  - genus †Pterosclerogibba Olmi, 2005 Dominican amber, Miocene
  - genus Sclerogibba Riggio & De Stefani-Perez, 1888
- †Burmasclerogibba Perkovsky et al 2019 Burmese amber, Cenomanian
- †Chosia Fujiyama 1994 Choshi amber, Japan, Aptian
- †Cretosclerogibba Perkovsky et al 2019 Burmese amber, Cenomanian
- †Edrossia Perkovsky et al 2019 Burmese amber, Cenomanian
- †Gallosclerogibba Perkovsky et al 2019 Charentese amber, France, Cenomanian
