= Plumariidae =

Scientific classification
- Kingdom: Animalia
- Phylum: Arthropoda
- Clade: Pancrustacea
- Class: Insecta
- Order: Hymenoptera
- Superfamily: Chrysidoidea
- Family: Plumariidae; Bischoff, 1914

Family of wasps

Plumariidae is a family of wasps within Chysidoidea. They are found in arid areas in South America and Southern Africa. The South African genera are more closely related to South American genera than each other suggesting that the family formed before the breakup of Gondwana. Knowledge of the wasps is based mostly on males, as females are rarely collected. Males are nocturnal and attracted to light while females have been collected from under stones and in pitfall traps. Very little is known of their biology however they are most likely parasitoids of other arthropods theorized to be the larvae of underground beetles.

Members of the family demonstrate extreme sexual dimorphism with females being wingless and having a flattened, highly modified, thorax with strong fossorial legs suggesting a subterranean habitat. Meanwhile males have broad wings with rich wing venation. Both males and females are pale to dark brown and have antenna with 13 (rarely 12) segments.

== Taxonomy ==
Plumariidae is widely considered to be a sister group to the rest of Chrysidoidea with the closest related family being the extinct family Plumalexiidae. Plumariidae currently contains the following 8 genera with the genus Parapenesia was originally placed within the family Bethylidae before being moved:

- Maplurius Roig-Alsina, 1994
- Mapluroides Diez, Fidalgo & Roig-Alsina, 2007
- Myrmecopterina Bischoff, 1914
- Myrmecopterinella Day, 1977
- Parapenesia Kieffer, 1910
- Plumarius Philippi, 1873
- Plumaroides Brothers, 1974
- Pluroides Diez, Roig-Alsina & Fidalgo, 2010
