= Zaza Formation =

Geologic formation in Russia

- Stratigraphic range: Early Cretaceous Valanginian–Aptian
- Type: Geological formation
- Overlies: Paleozoic granite basement
- Thickness: Around 80 metres at Baissa

Lithology
- Primary: Sandstone, siltstone, marl, and bituminous shale
- Other: Conglomerate, limestone

Location
- Region: Buryatia
- Country: Russia

The Zaza Formation is a geological formation located in Buryatia (Russia). It dates to the Lower Cretaceous. The age of the formation is disputed, and is considered likely to be Valanginian-Hauterivian, or Aptian in age. It comprises sandstones, siltstones, marls and bituminous shales, deposited in a stratified lake. It is situated on a large granite plateau in the NE of Buryatia. The formation is known for its numerous compression fossils of many varieties of insect found predominantly at the Baissa locality, located on the banks of the Vitim River. Insects are found in multiple beds throughout the succession, predominantly in the finer grained facies, the preservation of insect fossils is variable between beds, with good preservation in marl and poor preservation in shale beds.

== See also ==
- List of fossil sites
