= Latin diminutive =

Aspect of Latin grammar

The Latin language has a robust diminutive-forming system. There are many diminutive suffixes: those in calculus, axilla, fistula, and areola to start. There is often more than one correct way to form a diminutive, and many more incorrect ones.

== Gender ==
The masculine, feminine, and neuter diminutives often end in -us, -a, and -um.

- later, -is (m.) > later-cul-us (m.)
- mulier, -is (f.) > mulier-cul-a (f.)
- tūber, -is (n.) > tūber-cul-um (n.)

There are exceptions. These masculine words end in -a:

- scurr-a (m.) > scurr-ul-a (m.)
- vern-a (m.) > vern-ul-a (m.)

Many have a vowel, followed by one or two ls, followed by the endings just mentioned. Here we see stem + 'ul' + ending.

Example
Nomative	diminutive alterius generis	diminutive eiusdem generis
ac-us (f.)	aculeus (m.)	
calx, calc-is (f.)	calc-ulus (m.)	
can-is, -is (m./f.)	can-īcula (f.)	
catēn-a (f.)	catēl-lus (m.)	catēl-la (f.) / catēn-ula (f.)
cicer, -is (n.)	cicer-cula (f.)	
convent-us, -ūs (m.)	convent-iculum (n.)	
curr-us, -ūs (m.)	curr-iculum (n.)	
diē-s (m./f.)	diē-cula (f.)	
galēr-us (m.)	galēr-iculum (n.)	
gust-us, -ūs (m.)	gust-ulum (n.)	
linter, lintr-is (f.)	lintr-iculus (m.)	
nŭx, nŭc-is (f.)	nŭc-(u)leus (m.)	nŭc-ula (f.)
pistrīn-um (n.)	pistrīl-la (f.)	
rān-a (f.)	rān-unculus (m.)	rān-ula (f.)
statu-a (f.)	stat-unculum (n.)	
ungu-is, -is (m.)	ung-ula (f.)	ungu-iculus (m.)
vepr-ēs, -is (m.)	vepr-ēcula (f.)	

The rules can be a bit involved. The diminutive depends on the gender, declension (first, second, etc.) and the root's ending.

== First and second declension ==
=== Conspectus parvus ===
Stem termination	Diminutive formation	Examples			Vide :
Stem termination	Diminutive formation	Simplex form	Diminutive 1	diminutive 2	Vide :
-	+ -ul-	hort-us	hort-ul-us		hic
-e- / -i-	+ -ol-	calce-us	calce-ol-us		hic
-ul-	-ul- > -ell-	ocul-us	ocel-l-us		hic
-ul-	-ul- > -ill-	bacul-um	bacil-l-um		hic
muta + r	-r- > -ell-	umbr-a	umbel-l-a		hic
-er-	-er- > -ell-	oper-a	opel-l-a	oper-ul-a	hic
-ēn-	-ēn- > -ēll-	catēn-a	catēl-l-a	catēn-ul-a	hic
-ĭn-	-ĭn- > -ell-	pāgĭn-a	pāgel-l-a	pāgĭn-ul-a	hic
-īn-	-īn- > -īll-	crumīn-a	crumīl-l-a		hic
-īn-	-īn- > -īll-	vāgīn-a		vāgīn-ul-a	hic
-ōn-	-ōn- > -ōll-	corōn-a	corōl-l-a	corōn-ul-a	hic
-gn-	-gn- > -gill-	pugn-us	pugil-l-us		hic
-gn-	-gn- > -gill-	agn-us		agn-ell -us	hic
-mn-	-mn- > -mell-	column-a	columel-l-a		hic
-mn-	-mn- > -mell-	aerumn-a		aerumn-ul-a	hic
-aul- -āl- -ēl-	-aul- > -auxill- -āl- > -axill- -ēl- > -exill-	paul-us	pauxil-l-us	paul-ul-us	hic

=== Regula Generalis ===
In general the diminutive of nouns of the first or second declension which end in obstruents or the semivowel /w/ (written <v>) take the suffix -ulus/-ula/-ulum (depending on grammatical gender).

Classis	Regular		Irregular	
Classis	principale	deminutive	principale	deminutive
Regula principalis	vīc-us	vīc-ulus		
Regula principalis	fīc-us (f.)	fīc-ula		
Regula principalis	port-a	port-ula		
Regula principalis	scurr-a (m.)	scurr-ula (m.)		
Regula principalis	crust-um	crust-ulum		
Regula principalis	cerv-a	cervula		
Regula principalis	rīvus	rīvulus		

=== Stems ending in Vowels ===
Nouns of the first or second declension whose stems end in a vowel typically take -ola, -olus, or -olum depending on if they are of the feminine, masculine, or neuter gender respectively. Words ending in the glide /w/ (written v), take -ul- like other stems ending in consonants (cf. cerva/cervula).

Classis	Regular		Irregular	
Classis	stem	diminutiive	stem	diminutive
Regula principalis	gladi-us	gladi-olus		
Regula principalis	besti-a	besti-ola		
Regula principalis	palli-um	palli-olum		
Regula principalis	calce-us	calce-olus		
Regula principalis	āre-a	āre-ola	hirne-a	hirn-ula
Regula principalis	horre-um	horre-olum		

In the first declension, -ia can become =illa or =ola. (Lucia → Lucilla, sed Tullia → Tulliola).

=== Roots with -ul- ===
Nouns whose stems end in -ul- (either the root itself, or due to the noun in question being a diminutive already), when their diminutive is formed, the stem-final, -ul- changes either to -ell- or -ill-. It is difficult to find any regular correspondence between the context surrounding -ul- and whether the diminutive's stem ends in -ell- or -ill-.

In the table below, those which are diminutives already have the original stem listed under "principle". In cases where the diminutive's meaning is very different from that of the original noun, the noun in question is enclosed with parentheses.

Stems ending in:	- (Principale)	Base single diminutive	deminutivum double-diminutive	
Stems ending in:	- (Principale)	Base single diminutive	in -ELL-	in -ILL-
-B(UL)-	-	fābul-a	fābell-a	
-B(UL)-	-	tābul-a	tābell-a	
-C(UL)-	-	~~ancul-a~~		ancill-a
-C(UL)-	-	bacul-um		bacill-um
-C(UL)-	-	crepitācul-um		crepitācill-um
-C(UL)-	cōdex	cōdicul-us		cōdicill-us
-C(UL)-	mollis (adi.)	mollicul-us (adi.)	mollicell-us (adi.)	
-C(UL)-	(pēnis)	pēnicul-us		pēnicill-us
-C(UL)-	avis	avicul-a	aucell-a	
-C(UL)-	locus	locul-us	locell-us	
-C(UL)-	-	ocul-us	ocell-us	
-C(UL)-	-	pōcul-um		pōcill-um
-C(UL)-	bucca	buccul-a	buccell-a	
-C(UL)-	porcus	porcul-us	porcell-us	
-C(UL)-	furca	furcul-a		furcill-a
-D(UL)-	haedus	haedul-us		haedill-us
-F(UL)-	offa	offul-a	ŏfell-a	
-G(UL)-	-	angul-us	angell-us	
-G(UL)-	-	singul-us (adi.)		singill-atim (adv.)
-G(UL)-	-	cingul-um		cingill-um
-G(UL)-	(unguis)	ungul-a	ungell-a	
-M(UL)-	mamma	mammul-a		mămill-a
-N(UL)-	āgnus)	~~āgnul-us~~	āgnell-us	
-N(UL)-	(ānus)	ānul-us	ānell-us	
-P(UL)-	-	manipul-us	manipell-us	
-P(UL)-	pūpus/-a	pūpul-us/-a		pūpill-us/-a
-R(UL)-	murmur	~~murmurul-um~~		murmurill-um
-R(UL)-	turtur	~~turturul-a~~		turturill-a
-S(UL)-	caps-a	capsul-a	capsell-a	
-S(UL)-	pūsus	~~pūsul-us~~		pŭsill-us
-T(UL)-	aries	~~arietul-us~~		arietill-us
-T(UL)-	-	catul-us/-a	catell-us/-a	
-T(UL)-	cist-a	cistul-a	cistell-a	
-T(UL)-	pūtus	~~pūtul-us~~		pŭtill-us
-T(UL)-	-	situl-a	sitell-a	

The double diminutives of words ending in -er, or -in-, are usually formed by adding -ul- to the end of the existing diminutive..

Context	Root	Single diminutive	Double diminutive
-in-	asin-us	asel-lus	asell-ulus
-er-	culter	cultel-lus	cult-ell-ulus
-ul-	ocul-us	ocellus	ocellulus

=== Roots with -r- ===
Stems ending in:	Examples		Following the general rule	
Stems ending in:	principale	deminutivum	principale	deminutivum
cons. + r	libĕr, libr-i	libel-lus		
cons. + r	umbr-a	umbel-la		
cons. + r	fenestr-a	fenestel-la	fenestr-a	fenestr-ula
cons. + r	sacr-um	sacel-lum		
-ĕr-	misĕr, misĕr-i (adi.)	misel-lus	misĕr, misĕr-i (adi.)	misĕr-ulus
-ĕr-	tenĕr, tenĕr-i (adi.)	tenel-lus	tenĕr, tenĕr-i (adi.)	tenĕr-ulus
-ĕr-	puĕr, puĕr-i	puel-lus	puĕr, puĕr-i	puĕr-ulus
-ĕr-	opĕr-a	opel-la	opĕr-a	opĕr-ula
-ĕr-	tessĕr-a	tessel-la	tessĕr-a	tessĕr-ula
-ĕr-	camĕr-a	camel-la	littĕr-a	littĕr-ula
-ĕr-	patĕr-a	patel-la		
-ŏr-	amphŏr-a	ampul-la		
-ŭr-	satŭr, satŭr-i (adi.)	satul-lus		

=== Roots with -n- ===
Stems ending in:	Examples		Following the general rule	
Stems ending in:	principale	deminutivum	principale	deminutivum
-ēn-	catēn-a	catēl-la /-lus (m.)	catēn-a	catēn-ula
-ēn-			cēn-a	cēn-ula
-ēn-			habēn-a	habēn-ula
-ēn-			harēn-a	harēn-ula
-ēn-			vēn-a	vēn-ula
-ēn-			ahēn-um	ahēn-ulum
-ĭn-	asĭn-us/-a	asel-lus/-la	domĭn-us	domĭn-ulus
-ĭn-	gemĭn-us	gemel-lus		
-ĭn-	fēmĭn-a	fēmel-la	sarcĭn-a	sarcĭn-ula
-ĭn-	fiscĭn-a	fiscel-la	fuscĭn-a	fuscĭn-ula
-ĭn-	pāgĭn-a	pāgel-la	pāgĭn-a	pāgĭn-ula
-ĭn-	lāmĭn-a	lāmel-la		
-ĭn-	patĭn-a	patel-la		
-īn-	bovīn-us (adi.)	bovīl-lus	gallīn-a	gallīn-ula
-īn-	catīn-us	catīl-lus	piscīn-a	piscīn-ula
-īn-	lupīn-us	lupīl-lus	spīn-a	spīn-ula
-īn-	crumīn-a	crumīl-la	vāgīn-a	vāgīn-ula
-īn-	salīn-um	salīl-lum		
-īn-	pulvīn-us	pulvīl-lus		
-īn-	pistrīn-um	pistrīl-la (f.)		
-īn-	vīn-um	vīl-lum		
-ōn-	corōn-a	corōl-la	corōn-a	corōn-ula
-ōn-	persōn-a	persōl-la	caupōn-a	caupōn-ula
-ōn-			zōn-a	zōn-ula
-gn-	pugn-us	pugil-lus	agn-us	agn-ellus
-gn-	sign-um	sigil-lum		
-gn-	tign-um	tigil-lum		
-mn-	column-a	columel-la	aerumn-a	aerumn-ula
-mn-	lāmn-a	lāmel-la	lāmn-a	lāmn-ula
-mn-	scamn-um	scabel-lum scabil-lum scamil-lus (m.)	domn-a	domn-ula

=== Roots with -xill- ===
Stirpes exeuntes in:	Exempla		Excepta	
Stirpes exeuntes in:	principale	deminutivum	principale	deminutivum
-aul- -āl- -ēl-	paul-us (adi.)	pauxil-lus	paul-us (adi.)	paul-ulus
-aul- -āl- -ēl-	pāl-us	paxil-lus		
-aul- -āl- -ēl-	tāl-us	taxil-lus		
-aul- -āl- -ēl-	āl-a	axil-la	āl-a	āl-icula
-aul- -āl- -ēl-	māl-a	maxil-la		
-aul- -āl- -ēl-	vēl-um	vexil-lum		

=== Exceptions ===
deminutiva exeuntia in:	Exempla		
deminutiva exeuntia in:	principale	deminutivum irregulare	deminutivum regulare
-CUL-	lagoen-a / lagōna	lagun-cula	
-ĀCUL-	vern-a (m.)	vern-āculus (m. / adi.)	vern-ula (m.)
-ICUL-	āl-a	āl-icula	axil-la
-ICUL-	bland-us (adi.)	bland-iculus	bland-ulus
-ICUL-	galēr-us (m.)	galēr-iculum (n.)	
-ICUL-	montān-us (adi.)	montān-iculus	
-ICUL-	pann-us	pann-iculus	pann-ulus
-ICUL-	pugn-a	pugn-icula	
-ICUL-	thyrs-us	thyrs-iculus	
-ICUL-	uter-us	utr-iculus	
-IOL-	sigill-um	sigill-iolum	
-IOL-	tympan-um	tympan-iolum	
-UNCUL-	av-us	av-unculus	
-UNCUL-	lemb-us	lemb-unculus	
-UNCUL-	mendāci-um	mendāci-unculum	
-UNCUL-	petas-us	petas-unculus	
-UNCUL-	rān-a (f.)	rān-unculus (m.)	rān-ula (f.)
-UNCUL-	statu-a (f.)	stat-unculum (n.)	
-UNCUL-	tuguri-um	tuguri-unculum	tuguri-olum
-USCUL-	rām-us	rām-usculus	rām-ulus
-ULEUS	equ-us	ec-uleus	ec-ulus / equolus

== Third declension ==
in -es, -is & -e

Nomina exeuntia in:	Formatio deminutivi	Exempla			Vide :
Nomina exeuntia in:	Formatio deminutivi	principale	deminutivum 1	deminutivum 2	Vide :
-ēs	-ēcul-	vulp-ēs	vulp-ēcul-a		hic
-is	-icul-	nāv-is	nāv-icul-a		hic
-ĕ	-icul-	rēt-ĕ	rēt-icul-um		hic

More nouns, third declension

Stirpes exeuntes in:	Formatio deminutivi	Exempla			Vide :
Stirpes exeuntes in:	Formatio deminutivi	principale	deminutivum 1	deminutivum 2	Vide :
-c- / -g-	+ -ul-	făx, făc-is	făc-ul-a		hic
-t- / -d-	+ -ul-	nepōs, nepōt-is	nepōt-ul-us		hic
-t- / -d-	+ -icul-	anăs, anăt-is		anăt-icul-a	hic
-p- / -b-	+ -icul-	plēbs, plēb-is	plēb-icul-a		hic
-n-	-ōn- > -uncul-	ratio, ratiōn-is	ratiun-cul-a		hic
-n-	-ĭn- > -uncul-	homo, homĭn-is	homun-cul-us		hic
-r(r)- / -l(l)-	+ -cul-	mulier, -is	mulier-cul-a		hic
-r- < -s-	+ -cul-	mūs, mūr-is	mūs-cul-us		hic
-r- < -s-	+ -cul-	rūmor, rūmōris	rūmus-cul-us		hic
plures cons.	+ -icul-	venter, ventr-is	ventr-icul-us		hic

=== Nouns in -ēs, -is ===
Nomina exeuntia in:	Exempla		Excepta	
Nomina exeuntia in:	principale	deminutivum	principale	deminutivum
-ēs, -is	vulp-ēs, -is	vulp-ēcula	saepēs, -is	saep-icula
-ēs, -is	nūb-ēs, -is	nūb-ēcula		
-ēs, -is	vepr-ēs, -is (m.)	vepr-ēcula (f.)		

=== Nouns in -is, -is (m./f.) or -ĕ, -is (n.) ===
Words ending in:	Exempla		Exceptions	
Words ending in:	principale	deminutivum	principale	deminutivum
-is, -is (m./f.) -ĕ, -is (n.)	turr-is, -is	turr-icula	vall-is, -is	vall-ēcula
-is, -is (m./f.) -ĕ, -is (n.)	nāv-is, -is	nāv-icula	vīt-is, -is	vīt-ēcula (iuxta vīt-icula)
-is, -is (m./f.) -ĕ, -is (n.)	ign-is, -is	ign-iculus	corb-is	corb-ula
-is, -is (m./f.) -ĕ, -is (n.)	fort-is, -is (adi.)	fort-iculus	virid-is, -is (adi.)	virid-ulus
-is, -is (m./f.) -ĕ, -is (n.)	rēt-ĕ, -is (n.)	rēt-iculum	ass-is, -is	ass-ula
-is, -is (m./f.) -ĕ, -is (n.)	can-is, -is (m./f.)	can-īcula (f.)	iuven-is, -is	iuven-culus
-is, -is (m./f.) -ĕ, -is (n.)	cut-is, -is	cut-īcula		
-is, -is (m./f.) -ĕ, -is (n.)	febr-is, -is	febr-īcula		

=== Roots with -c- & -g- ===
Stirpes exeuntes in:	Exempla		Excepta	
Stirpes exeuntes in:	principale	deminutivum	principale	deminutivum
-c- -g-	făx, făc-is	făc-ula		
-c- -g-	nŭx, nŭc-is (f.)	nŭc-ula	nŭx, nŭc-is (f.)	nŭc(u)leus (m.)
-c- -g-	rēx, rēg-is	rēg-ulus		
-c- -g-	vōx, vōc-is	vōc-ula		
-c- -g-	audāx, audāc-is (adi.)	audāc-ulus		
-c- -g-	lanx, lanc-is	lanc-ula	lanx, lanc-is	lanc-icula
-c- -g-	falx, falc-is	falc-ula	falx, falc-is	falc-icula
-c- -g-	calx, calc-is (f.)	calc-ulus (m.)		

=== Roots with -t- and -d- ===
Stirpes exeuntes in:	deminutiva in -ul-		deminutiva in -icul-		Formae irregulares	
Stirpes exeuntes in:	principale	deminutivum	principale	deminutivum	principale	deminutivum
-t- -d-	nepōs, nepōt-is	nepōt-ulus	pyxis, pyxid-is	pyxid-icula	lapis, lapid-is	lapil-lus
-t- -d-	aetās, aetāt-is	aetāt-ula	anăs, anăt-is	anăt-icula	cor, cordis	cor-culum
-t- -d-	civitās, civitāt-is	civitāt-ula			lucuns, lucunt-is	lucun-culus
-t- -d-	mercēs, mercēd-is	mercēd-ula	pēs, pĕd-is	pĕd-iculus	pēs, pĕd-is	pĕd-iolus / pĕt-iolus
-t- -d-	caput, capit-is	capit-ulum	sors, sort-is	sort-icula		
-t- -d-	glans, gland-is	gland-ula	puls, pult-is	pult-icula		
-t- -d-	valens, valent-is (adi.)	valent-ulus	dens, dent-is	dent-iculus		
-t- -d-	infans, infant-is (adi.)	infant-ulus	lens, lent-is	lent-icula		
-t- -d-	blandiloquens, ~nt-is (adi.)	blandiloquent-ulus	fons, font-is	font-iculus		
-t- -d-	adulescens, ~nt-is (adi.)	adulescent-ulus	pons, pont-is	pont-iculus		
-t- -d-	ariēs, ariĕt-is	ariĕt-illus	pars, part-is	part-icula		

=== Roots with -p- et -b- ===
Stirpes exeuntes in:	Exempla		Excepta	
Stirpes exeuntes in:	principale	deminutivum	principale	deminutivum
-p-? -b-	plēbs, plēb-is	plēb-icula	(plēbēs, -is)	plēb-ēcula
-p-? -b-	scrobs, scrob-is	scrob-iculus		
-p-? -b-	trabs, trab-is	trab-icula	(trabēs, -is)	trab-ēcula

=== Roots with -n- ===
Stirpes exeuntes in:	Exemplars		Exceptions	
Stirpes exeuntes in:	base	diminutive	base	diminutive
-n-	ratio, ratiōn-is	ratiun-cula		
-n-	sermo, sermōn-is	sermun-culus		
-n-	lēno, lēnōn-is	lēnun-culus	lēno, lēnōn-is	lēnul-lus
-n-	homo, homĭn-is	homun-culus	homo, homĭn-is	homul-lus / homun-cio, ~ōnis
-n-	caro, carn-is	carun-cula		
-n-	pectĕn, pectĭn-is	pectun-culus	flumĕn, flumĭn-is	flum-icellum
-n-	sanguis, sanguĭn-is	sangun-culus		

=== Roots with -r(r)- et -l(l)-et -s- ===
Stirpes exeuntes in:	Exempla		Excepta	
Stirpes exeuntes in:	principale	deminutivum	principale	deminutivum
-r(r)-	later, later-is	later-culus	later, later-is	later-iculus
-r(r)-	mulier, mulier-is	mulier-cula	fūr, fūr-is	fūr-unculus
-r(r)-	tūber, tūber-is	tūber-culum	turtŭr, turtŭr-is (m./f.)	turtŭr-illa
-r(r)-	cicer, cicer-is (n.)	cicer-cula (f.)	murmŭr, murmŭr-is (n.)	murmŭr-illum
-r(r)-	pauper, pauper-is (adi.)	pauper-culus	iecŭr, iecŏr-is	iecus-culum
-r(r)-	amātor, amātōr-is	amātor-culus		
-r(r)-	soror, sorōr-is	soror-cula		
-r(r)-	vēr, vēr-is	vēr-culum		
-r(r)-	far, farr-is	far-culum		
-l(l)-	mel, mell-is	mel-culum		
-s-	vās, vās-is	vās-culum		

=== Roots with -r- and -s- ===
Stirpes exeuntes in:	Exempla		Excepta	
Stirpes exeuntes in:	principale	deminutivum	principale	deminutivum
-r- ex -s-	mās, măr-is (m. subst.)	mās-culus (adi.)		
-r- ex -s-	pulvis, pulvĕr-is	pulvis-culus		
-r- ex -s-	flōs, flōr-is	flōs-culus		
-r- ex -s-	ōs, ōr-is	ōs-culum		
-r- ex -s-	mūs, mūr-is	mūs-culus		
-r- ex -s-	mūnŭs, mūnĕr-is	mūnus-culum	vetus, vetĕr-is (adi.)	vet-ulus
-r- ex -s-	corpŭs, corpŏr-is	corpus-culum		
-r- ex -s-	meliŏr, meliōr-is (adi.)	melius-culus		
-r- ex -s-	rūmŏr, rūmōr-is	rūmus-culus		
-r- ex -s-	arbŏr, arbŏr-is	arbus-cula		
'iecur'	iecŭr, iecŏr-is	iecus-culum		

=== Roots with -u- et -v- ===
Stirpes exeuntes in:	Exempla		Excepta	
Stirpes exeuntes in:	principale	deminutivum	principale	deminutivum
-u-	sūs, sŭ-is (m./f.)	sŭ-cula (f.)		
-v-	bōs, bŏv-is (m./f.)	bū-cula (f.)		

=== Stems ending in two or more consonants ===
Stems ending with:	Exempla		Excepta	
Stems ending with:	principale	deminutivum	principale	deminutivum
two or more consonants	venter, ventr-is	ventr-iculus	păter, pătr-is	păter-culus
two or more consonants	linter, lintr-is (f.)	lintr-iculus (m.)	māter, mātr-is	māter-cula
two or more consonants	uter, utr-is	utr-iculus	frāter, frātr-is	frāter-culus / frātel-lus
two or more consonants	ācer, ācr-is (adi.)	ācr-iculus		
two or more consonants	os, oss-is	oss-iculum		

== Fourth declension ==
Classis	Exempla		Excepta	
Classis	principale	deminutivum	principale	deminutivum
Regula generalis	art-us	art-iculus	lac-us	lac-usculus
Regula generalis	vers-us	vers-iculus		
Regula generalis	convent-us (m.)	convent-iculum (n.)	gust-us (m.)	gust-ulum (n.)
Regula generalis	curr-us (m.)	curr-iculum (n.)		
Regula generalis	an-us (f.)	an-icula	dom-us (f.)	dom-uncula /-uscula
Regula generalis	man-us (f.)	man-icula	ac-us (f.)	aculeus (m.)
Regula generalis	corn-u	corn-iculum		
Regula generalis	gen-u	gen-iculum		

== Fifth declension ==
In the fifth declension, Latin nouns generally take -cula.

Classis	Exempla		Excepta	
Classis	principale	deminutivum	principale	deminutivum
Regula principalis	diē-s (m./f.)	diē-cula (f.)		
Regula principalis	rē-s (f.)	rē-cula (f.)	rē-s (f.)	rēs-cula (f.)
Regula principalis	spē-s (f.)	spē-cula (f.)		
Regula principalis	plēbē-s (f.)	plēbē-cula (f.)		
