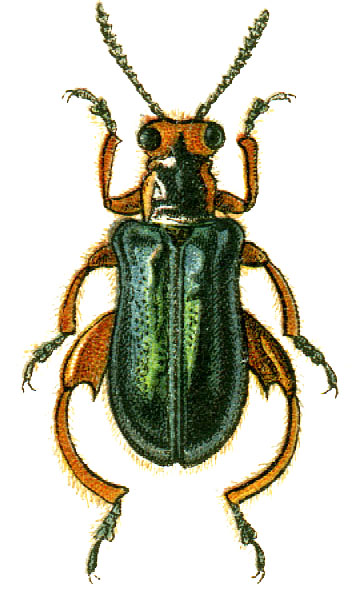
- Poecilomorpha cyanipennis

Scientific classification
- Domain: Eukaryota
- Kingdom: Animalia
- Phylum: Arthropoda
- Class: Insecta
- Order: Coleoptera
- Suborder: Polyphaga
- Infraorder: Cucujiformia
- Family: Megalopodidae
- Subfamily: Megalopodinae
- Genus: Poecilomorpha; Hope, 1840

Type species
- Poecilomorpha passerini Hope, 1840

Synonyms
- Clythraxeloma Kraatz, 1879

= Poecilomorpha =

Genus of beetles

Poecilomorpha is a genus of beetles in the family Megalopodidae.

== Taxonomy ==
The concept of Poecilomorpha has been widely utilized to include disparate species from the Ethiopian and Oriental regions. Poecilomorpha comprised close to 50 species in 2021. Throughout the history of the genus, many species originally described in the genus have been transferred to other genera or have been the basis for the creation of new ones (such as Piomelopus, Bryantonaria and Antonaria). Poecilomorpha has been a 'dumping ground' within Megalopodidae.

== Species ==
A revision of the genus in 2025 includes the following species in the genus:

- Poecilomorpha cribricollis (Pic, 1951)
- Poecilomorpha minuta (Pic, 1951)
- Poecilomorpha passerinii Hope, 1841
- Poecilomorpha pseudocribricollis Rodríguez-Mirón, 2025

Most other species have been transferred to Leucastea, Sphondylia, Monrosolopha and Macrolopha. Also, some species are still placed in Poecilomorpha, but will probably be transferred to other genera following further study. These Poecilomorpha incertae sedis are:

- Poecilomorpha atricolor Pic, 1951
- Poecilomorpha atripennis Pic 1946
- Poecilomorpha atripes Lacordaire, 1845
- Poecilomorpha bicoloripes Pic, 1951
- Poecilomorpha binotata Péringuey, 1892
- Poecilomorpha calabarica Westwood, 1864
- Poecilomorpha divisa Jacoby, 1895
- Poecilomorpha dollmani Bryant, 1931
- Poecilomorpha freyi Pic, 1951
- Poecilomorpha hacquardi Pic, 1955
- Poecilomorpha maynei Pic, 1951
- Poecilomorpha nigricornis Pic, 1955
- Poecilomorpha preapicalis Pic, 1955
- Poecilomorpha variabilis Perroud, 1853
- Poecilomorpha viridipennis Pic, 1951
- Poecilomorpha suturalis (Clavareau, 1909)

== Species historically included in the genus ==
- Poecilomorpha abyssiniea Pic, 1951
- Poecilomorpha apicalis Pic, 1951
- Poecilomorpha assamensis (Jacoby, 1908)
- Poecilomorpha atricolor Pic, 1951
- Poecilomorpha atricornis Pic, 1951
- Poecilomorpha atripes Lacordaire, 1845
- Poecilomorpha aureovillosa Jacoby, 1894
- Poecilomorpha bicoloripes Pic, 1951
- Poecilomorpha binotata Peringuey, 1892
- Poecilomorpha bipartita Lacordaire, 1845
- Poecilomorpha calabarica Westwood, 1864
- Poecilomorpha chariensis Pic, 1912
- Poecilomorpha curta Pic, 1951
- Poecilomorpha cyanipennis (Kraatz, 1879)
- Poecilomorpha delagoensis Pic, 1913
- Poecilomorpha discolineata (Pic, 1938)
- Poecilomorpha diversipes Pic, 1951
- Poecilomorpha divisa Jacoby, 1895
- Poecilomorpha dollmani Bryant, 1931
- Poecilomorpha downesii (Baly, 1859)
- Poecilomorpha fasciaticeps Pic, 1951
- Poecilomorpha freyi Pic, 1951
- Poecilomorpha gerstaeckeri Westwood, 1864
- Poecilomorpha immaculatipes Pic, 1951
- Poecilomorpha impressipennis Pic, 1951
- Poecilomorpha lacordairii Westwood, 1864
- Poecilomorpha laosensis (Pic, 1922)
- Poecilomorpha laticornis Pic, 1951
- Poecilomorpha luteipennis Westwood, 1864
- Poecilomorpha maculata (Pic, 1926)
- Poecilomorpha maynei Pic, 1951
- Poecilomorpha mouhoti (Baly, 1864)
- Poecilomorpha nigroapicalis Pic, 1951
- Poecilomorpha nigrocyanea Motschulsky, 1866
- Poecilomorpha nigromaculata Pic, 1951
- Poecilomorpha overlaeti Pic, 1951
- Poecilomorpha passerini Hope, 1840
- Poecilomorpha preapicalis Pic, 1955
- Poecilomorpha pretiosa (Reineck, 1923)
- Poecilomorpha tarsata Bryant, 1941
- Poecilomorpha testaceipennis Pic, 1917
- Poecilomorpha trilineata Erber & Medvedev, 2002
- Poecilomorpha trimaculata Pic, 1951
- Poecilomorpha usambarica Weise, 1902
- Poecilomorpha variabilis Perroud, 1853
- Poecilomorpha viridipennis Pic, 1951
- Poecilomorpha westermanni Westwood, 1864
