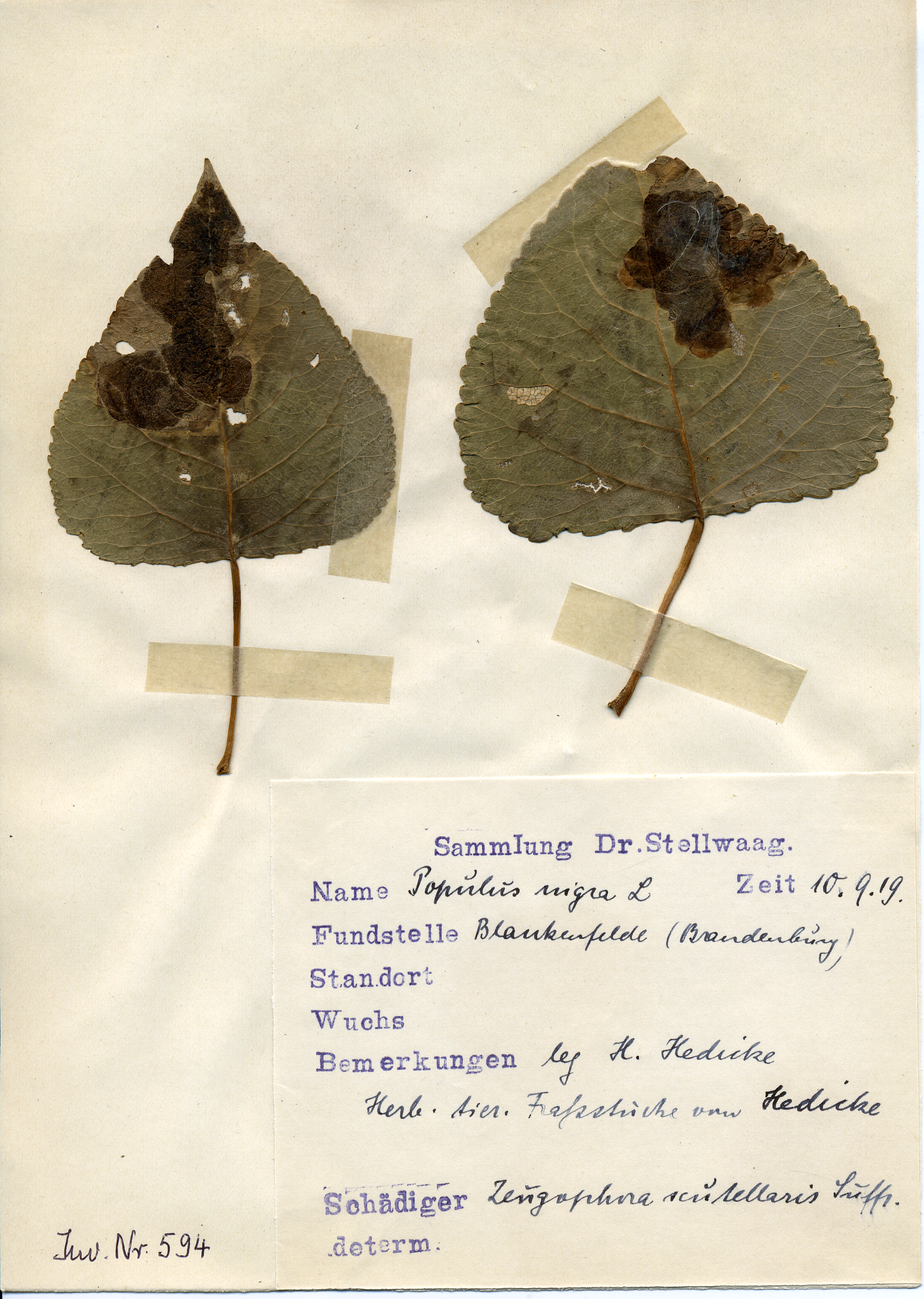

Scientific classification
- Domain: Eukaryota
- Kingdom: Animalia
- Phylum: Arthropoda
- Class: Insecta
- Order: Coleoptera
- Suborder: Polyphaga
- Infraorder: Cucujiformia
- Family: Megalopodidae
- Genus: Zeugophora
- Species: Z. scutellaris

Binomial name
- Zeugophora scutellaris Suffrian, 1840

= Zeugophora scutellaris =

Species of beetle

Zeugophora scutellaris, known generally as the poplar blackmine beetle or cottonwood leaf-mining beetle, is a species of megalopodid leaf beetle in the family Megalopodidae. It is found in Europe and Northern Asia (excluding China) and North America.
