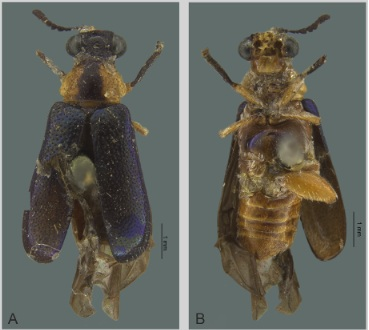

Scientific classification
- Domain: Eukaryota
- Kingdom: Animalia
- Phylum: Arthropoda
- Class: Insecta
- Order: Coleoptera
- Suborder: Polyphaga
- Infraorder: Cucujiformia
- Family: Megalopodidae
- Genus: Poecilomorpha
- Species: P. passerinii

Binomial name
- Poecilomorpha passerinii Hope, 1841

Synonyms
- Poecilomorpha innotata Pic, 1911

= Poecilomorpha passerinii =

Species of beetle

Poecilomorpha passerinii is a species of beetle of the Megalopodidae family. This species is found in Benin, Ghana, Nigeria, the Republic of the Congo and Sierra Leone.

Adults reach a length of about 6.4–7.1 mm. The head and antennae are black, while the mandibles, labium, maxilla, thorax and abdomen are orange. The pronotal disc is brown and the elytra is iridescent, varying from blue to green.
