= Bothromegalopus =

Scientific classification
- Domain: Eukaryota
- Kingdom: Animalia
- Phylum: Arthropoda
- Class: Insecta
- Order: Coleoptera
- Suborder: Polyphaga
- Infraorder: Cucujiformia
- Family: Megalopodidae
- Subfamily: Megalopodinae
- Genus: Bothromegalopus; Monrós, 1947

Type species
- Megalopus pilipes Lacordaire, 1845

Synonyms
- Bothromogalopus Auctt. (Misspelling)

Genus of beetles

Bothromegalopus is a genus of beetles in the family Megalopodidae, containing the following species:

- Bothromegalopus gibbosus (Pic, 1916)
- Bothromegalopus pilipes (Lacordaire, 1845)
