= Mastostethus =

Scientific classification
- Kingdom: Animalia
- Phylum: Arthropoda
- Class: Insecta
- Order: Coleoptera
- Suborder: Polyphaga
- Infraorder: Cucujiformia
- Family: Megalopodidae
- Subfamily: Megalopodinae
- Genus: Mastostethus; Lacordaire, 1845

Type species
- Megalopus balteatus (= Megalopus nigrocinctus Chevrolat, 1834) Klug, 1834

Genus of beetles

Mastostethus is a genus of beetles in the family Megalopodidae, containing the following species:

- Mastostethus abbreviatus (Klug, 1834)
- Mastostethus abdominalis (Klug, 1824)
- Mastostethus albomaculatus Pic, 1917
- Mastostethus alternans (Klug, 1834)
- Mastostethus angustalisi Pic, 1916
- Mastostethus angustovittatus Jacoby, 1892
- Mastostethus argentinensis Jacoby, 1904
- Mastostethus atrofasciatus (Blanchard, 1843)
- Mastostethus aulicus Lacordaire, 1845
- Mastostethus aurantiacus (Blanchard, 1843)
- Mastostethus balyi Jacoby, 1904
- Mastostethus basalis Baly, 1879
- Mastostethus batesi Baly, 1859
- Mastostethus bicolor (Klug, 1824)
- Mastostethus binotatus (Klug, 1824)
- Mastostethus bipunctatus (Klug, 1824)
- Mastostethus bivittatus Pic, 1919
- Mastostethus bizonatus Clark, 1865
- Mastostethus bolivianus Jacoby, 1904
- Mastostethus braziliensis Papp, 1949
- Mastostethus buckleyi Baly, 1879
- Mastostethus cardinalis (Klug, 1834)
- Mastostethus chontalensis Jacoby, 1880
- Mastostethus cordovensis Jacoby, 1888
- Mastostethus costaricensis Guérin, 1948
- Mastostethus curvatus (Fabricius, 1801)
- Mastostethus curvipes (Fabricius, 1801)
- Mastostethus cyclostigma Bates, 1866
- Mastostethus decoratus Guérin, 1944
- Mastostethus dentatus (Klug, 1824)
- Mastostethus depressus (Klug, 1824)
- Mastostethus diadema (Klug, 1834)
- Mastostethus dimidiatus (Klug, 1824)
- Mastostethus discoidalis Pic, 1917
- Mastostethus disjunctus Pic, 1916
- Mastostethus distinctus Lacordaire, 1845
- Mastostethus donckieri Pic, 1916
- Mastostethus duplocinctus Clark, 1866
- Mastostethus elongatus Guérin, 1944
- Mastostethus ephippiger (Mannerheim, 1826)
- Mastostethus erichsoni Jacoby, 1904
- Mastostethus erythrosoma (Blanchard, 1843)
- Mastostethus fecialis Bates, 1866
- Mastostethus femoralis Pic, 1948
- Mastostethus femoratus Jacoby, 1888
- Mastostethus ferrugineus (Olivier, 1791)
- Mastostethus flavovittatus Jacoby, 1903
- Mastostethus flavus Pic, 1946
- Mastostethus fraternus Baly, 1876
- Mastostethus frontalinotatus Clark, 1866
- Mastostethus frontalis (Klug, 1824)
- Mastostethus funereus Jacoby, 1904
- Mastostethus germari Lacordaire, 1845
- Mastostethus gounellei Pic, 1916
- Mastostethus gozioi Rodríguez-Mirón, 2017
- Mastostethus gracilentus Jacoby, 1888
- Mastostethus gracilis Rodríguez-Mirón, 2017
- Mastostethus haematomelas Lacordaire, 1845
- Mastostethus hieroglyphicus (Klug, 1834)
- Mastostethus histrio Lacordaire, 1845
- Mastostethus humeralis Pic, 1916
- Mastostethus humeronotatus Jacoby, 1888
- Mastostethus imitans Jacoby, 1888
- Mastostethus inornatus Bates, 1866
- Mastostethus jabaquarensis Guérin, 1944
- Mastostethus jacobyi Clavareau, 1905
- Mastostethus jansoni Baly, 1876
- Mastostethus javeti Baly, 1859
- Mastostethus jekeli Baly, 1859
- Mastostethus lacordairei Jacoby, 1904
- Mastostethus lateritius (Klug, 1834)
- Mastostethus lavatus Baly, 1861
- Mastostethus lineatus Pic, 1916
- Mastostethus maculicollis Lacordaire, 1845
- Mastostethus martinezi Monrós, 1947
- Mastostethus melanopterus Guérin, 1944
- Mastostethus minutus Monrós, 1947
- Mastostethus modestus Jacoby, 1880
- Mastostethus monostigma Bates, 1866
- Mastostethus mulier Rodríguez-Mirón, 2019
- Mastostethus multinotatus Pic, 1917
- Mastostethus multipunctatus Lacordaire, 1845
- Mastostethus nigricollis Jacoby, 1904
- Mastostethus nigrifrons Lacordaire, 1845
- Mastostethus nigripennis Lacordaire, 1845
- Mastostethus nigrocinctus (Chevrolat, 1834)
- Mastostethus nigrofasciatus Jacoby, 1890
- Mastostethus nigroscutus Pic, 1916
- Mastostethus nigrovarius Jacoby, 1904
- Mastostethus notaticollis Clark, 1866
- Mastostethus novemmaculatus (Klug, 1834)
- Mastostethus obliquus (Fabricius, 1801)
- Mastostethus octomaculatus Jacoby, 1888
- Mastostethus pallidofasciatus Pic, 1917
- Mastostethus panamensis Jacoby, 1888
- Mastostethus pantherinus Lacordaire, 1845
- Mastostethus pascoei Baly, 1859
- Mastostethus perroudi Pic, 1946
- Mastostethus peruensis Jacoby, 1903
- Mastostethus phaleratus (Klug, 1834)
- Mastostethus philemon Baly, 1863
- Mastostethus picticollis Baly, 1876
- Mastostethus pictus Baly, 1876
- Mastostethus placidus Baly, 1876
- Mastostethus plato Bates, 1866
- Mastostethus pullatus Bates, 1866
- Mastostethus punctiger Kirsch, 1875
- Mastostethus quadrilineatus Guérin-Méneville, 1852
- Mastostethus quadrinotatus Erichson, 1847
- Mastostethus quadriplagiatus Jacoby, 1904
- Mastostethus quadripunctatus (Klug, 1834)
- Mastostethus quinquemaculatus Lacordaire, 1845
- Mastostethus robustus Clark, 1866
- Mastostethus rogersi Jacoby, 1880
- Mastostethus rubricollis (Chevrolat, 1834)
- Mastostethus ruficauda (Forsberg, 1821)
- Mastostethus rufipennis (Mannerheim, 1826)
- Mastostethus salvini Jacoby, 1878
- Mastostethus sanguineus Lacordaire, 1845
- Mastostethus sejunctus Bates, 1866
- Mastostethus sexguttatus Lacordaire, 1845
- Mastostethus sexpunctatus (Klug, 1834)
- Mastostethus sigma Bates, 1866
- Mastostethus signatipennis Pic, 1917
- Mastostethus sobrinus Lacordaire, 1845
- Mastostethus speciosus Baly, 1876
- Mastostethus stalii Baly, 1861
- Mastostethus stramineus Baly, 1866
- Mastostethus suavis Bates, 1866
- Mastostethus tarsatus Lacordaire, 1845
- Mastostethus terminalis (Blanchard, 1843)
- Mastostethus thoracicus Baly, 1859
- Mastostethus tibialis (Fabricius, 1801)
- Mastostethus transversalis Lacordaire, 1845
- Mastostethus triangulifer Pic, 1916
- Mastostethus tricinctus Lacordaire, 1845
- Mastostethus tricolor Kirsch, 1865
- Mastostethus trigeminus Lacordaire, 1845
- Mastostethus unifasciatus Pic, 1916
- Mastostethus uniplagiatus Lucas, 1857
- Mastostethus variegatus (Klug, 1824)
- Mastostethus verticalis (Klug, 1834)
- Mastostethus vexillarius Bates, 1866
- Mastostethus vicinus Lacordaire, 1845
- Mastostethus vittatus (Klug, 1824)
- Mastostethus zonatus (Klug, 1834)
