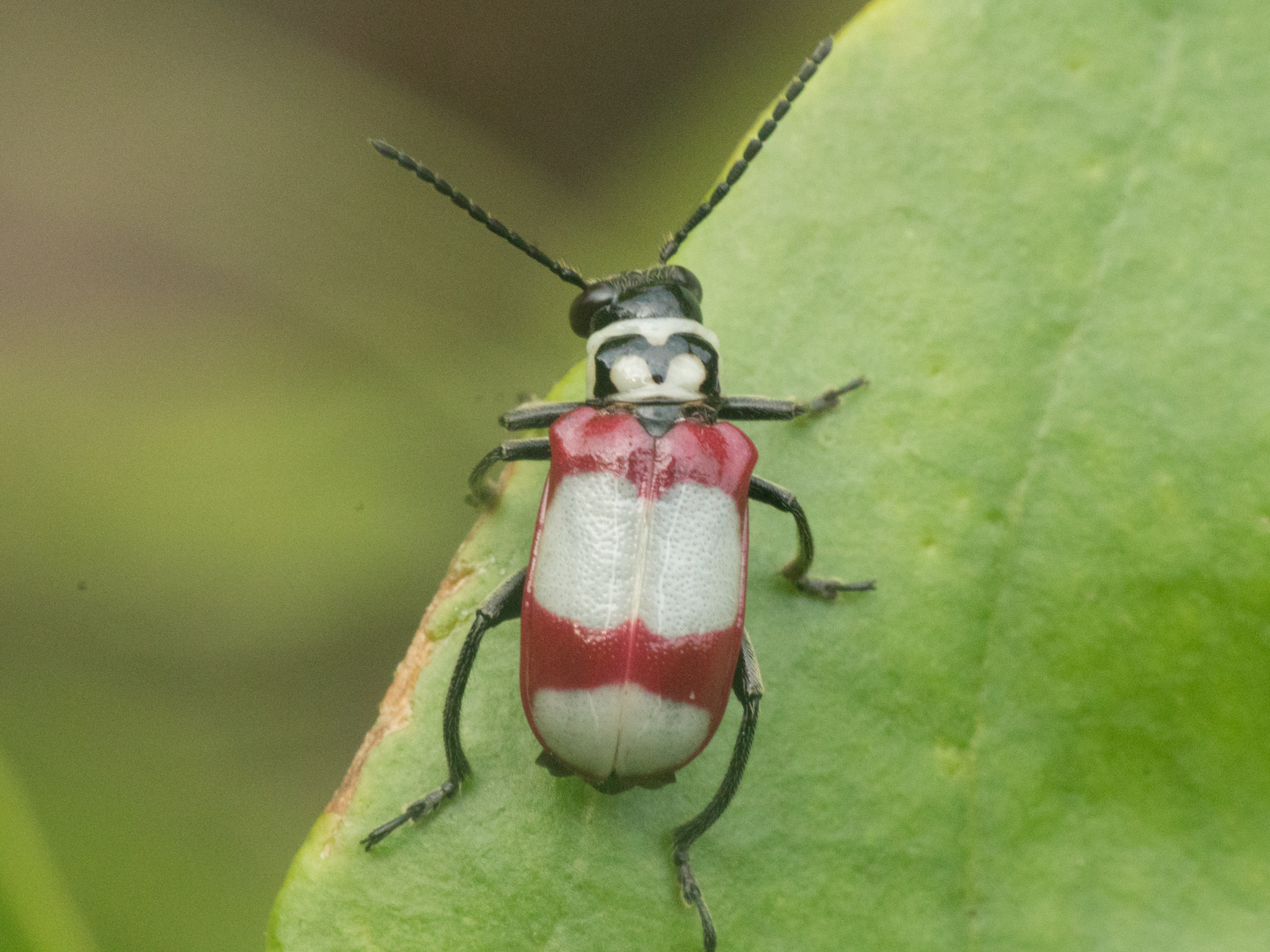
- Agathomerus flavomaculatus, Brazil

Scientific classification
- Domain: Eukaryota
- Kingdom: Animalia
- Phylum: Arthropoda
- Class: Insecta
- Order: Coleoptera
- Suborder: Polyphaga
- Infraorder: Cucujiformia
- Family: Megalopodidae
- Subfamily: Megalopodinae
- Genus: Agathomerus; Lacordaire, 1845

Type species
- Agathomerus pulcher Lacordaire, 1845

Subgenera
- Agathomeroides Monrós, 1947; Agathomerus Lacordaire, 1845; Euagathomerus Monrós, 1947; Longathomerus Pic, 1947; Mesagathomerus Monrós, 1947; Trichagathomerus Monrós, 1947

= Agathomerus =

Genus of beetles

Agathomerus is a genus of beetles in the family Megalopodidae, containing the following species:

- Subgenus Agathomeroides Monrós, 1947
  - Agathomerus flavomaculatus (Klug, 1824)
- Subgenus Agathomerus Lacordaire, 1845
  - Agathomerus affinis Jacoby, 1880
  - Agathomerus atripennis Jacoby, 1880
  - Agathomerus atripes Pic, 1947
  - Agathomerus azureipennis Lacordaire, 1845
  - Agathomerus basalis Pic, 1916
  - Agathomerus batesi Baly, 1859
  - Agathomerus bichito Monrós, 1945
  - Agathomerus bifasciatus (Klug, 1824)
  - Agathomerus bivittatus Lacordaire, 1845
  - Agathomerus coeruleus Bates, 1866
  - Agathomerus cyaneus Clark, 1845
  - Agathomerus cyanopterus Lacordaire, 1845
  - Agathomerus discoideus (Klug, 1824)
  - Agathomerus dubiosus Jacoby, 1876
  - Agathomerus egregius (Germar, 1823)
  - Agathomerus ephippium Lacordaire, 1845
  - Agathomerus fasciatus (Dalman, 1823)
  - Agathomerus freudi Guérin-Méneville, 1852
  - Agathomerus hahneli Pic, 1955
  - Agathomerus inapicalis Pic, 1955
  - Agathomerus incomparabilis Clark, 1866
  - Agathomerus interrupta Pic, 1947
  - Agathomerus lautus Bates, 1866
  - Agathomerus lemoulti Pic, 1916
  - Agathomerus lineatus Guérin-Méneville, 1852
  - Agathomerus luteoreductus Pic, 1955
  - Agathomerus monrosi Pic, 1947
  - Agathomerus nicki Guérin, 1948
  - Agathomerus nigricollis Clark, 1866
  - Agathomerus nobilis (Klug, 1834)
  - Agathomerus notaticollis Clark, 1866
  - Agathomerus obliterata Pic, 1947
  - Agathomerus pauper Bates, 1866
  - Agathomerus pictus Lacordaire, 1845
  - Agathomerus postmaculatus Pic, 1955
  - Agathomerus pulcher Lacordaire, 1845
  - Agathomerus rubrinotatus Clark, 1866
  - Agathomerus rufus (Klug, 1834)
  - Agathomerus sallei Baly, 1859
  - Agathomerus sexmaculatus (Kirby, 1818)
  - Agathomerus signatus (Klug, 1824)
  - Agathomerus simplicipennis Jacoby, 1880
  - Agathomerus succinctus (Klug, 1834)
  - Agathomerus superbus Pic, 1916
  - Agathomerus testaceus (Klug, 1824)
  - Agathomerus viduus Clark, 1866
  - Agathomerus zikani Guérin, 1951
- Subgenus Euagathomerus Monrós, 1947
  - Agathomerus elegans (Klug, 1834)
  - Agathomerus marginatus (Klug, 1824)
  - Agathomerus sellatus (Germar, 1824)
- Subgenus Longathomerus Pic, 1947
  - Agathomerus humeralis (Serville, 1825)
- Subgenus Mesagathomerus Monrós, 1947
  - Agathomerus quadrimaculatus (Guérin, 1945)
- Subgenus Trichagathomerus Monrós, 1947
  - Agathomerus subfasciatus (Germar, 1823)
