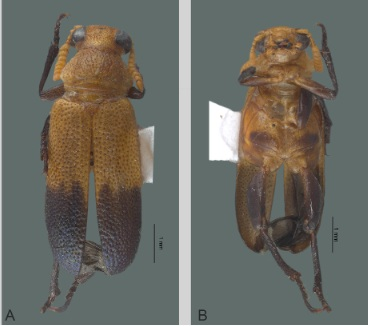

Scientific classification
- Domain: Eukaryota
- Kingdom: Animalia
- Phylum: Arthropoda
- Class: Insecta
- Order: Coleoptera
- Suborder: Polyphaga
- Infraorder: Cucujiformia
- Family: Megalopodidae
- Genus: Poecilomorpha
- Species: P. pseudocribricollis

Binomial name
- Poecilomorpha pseudocribricollis Rodríguez-Mirón, 2025

= Poecilomorpha pseudocribricollis =

Species of beetle

Poecilomorpha pseudocribricollis is a species of beetle in the family Megalopodidae. This species is found in the Democratic Republic of the Congo.

Adults reach a length of about 6.5 mm. The head, antennae, pronotum and elytral basal thirds are orange, while the elytral apical two-thirds is iridescent black-violet. The mandibles, legs and abdomen are brown.
