= Zeugophora bifasciata =

Scientific classification
- Kingdom: Animalia
- Phylum: Arthropoda
- Class: Insecta
- Order: Coleoptera
- Suborder: Polyphaga
- Infraorder: Cucujiformia
- Family: Megalopodidae
- Genus: Zeugophora
- Species: Z. bifasciata

Binomial name
- Zeugophora bifasciata Gressitt & Kimoto, 1961

Species of beetle

Zeugophora bifasciata is a species of beetle of the family Megalopodidae. It is found in China (Fujian).

== Description ==
Adults reach a length of about 5.1 mm. The head is reddish brown and the antennae are mostly dull brown. The prothorax is reddish brown, the scutellum pale brown and the elytra pale testaceous with a pitchy brown sutural stripe and two sinuous pitchy brown bands.

== Life history ==
No host plant has been documented for this species.
