= Temnaspis elegans =

Scientific classification
- Kingdom: Animalia
- Phylum: Arthropoda
- Class: Insecta
- Order: Coleoptera
- Suborder: Polyphaga
- Infraorder: Cucujiformia
- Family: Megalopodidae
- Genus: Temnaspis
- Species: T. elegans

Binomial name
- Temnaspis elegans Chujo, 1951

Synonyms
- Colobaspis elegans (Chujo, 1951)

Species of beetle

Temnaspis elegans is a species of beetle in the family Megalopodidae. It is found in Taiwan.
