= Megalopus elongatus =

Scientific classification
- Domain: Eukaryota
- Kingdom: Animalia
- Phylum: Arthropoda
- Class: Insecta
- Order: Coleoptera
- Suborder: Polyphaga
- Infraorder: Cucujiformia
- Family: Megalopodidae
- Genus: Megalopus
- Species: M. elongatus

Binomial name
- Megalopus elongatus Baly, 1876

Species of beetle

Megalopus elongatus is a beetle of the Megalopodidae family. It is found in Brazil and Colombia.
