= Barticaria =

Scientific classification
- Domain: Eukaryota
- Kingdom: Animalia
- Phylum: Arthropoda
- Class: Insecta
- Order: Coleoptera
- Suborder: Polyphaga
- Infraorder: Cucujiformia
- Family: Megalopodidae
- Subfamily: Megalopodinae
- Genus: Barticaria; Jacoby & Clavareau, 1905
- Species: B. cyaneus

Binomial name
- Barticaria cyaneus (Clark, 1866)

Synonyms
- Agathomerus cyaneus Clark, 1866; Megalopus coerulea Jacoby, 1903

Genus of beetles

Barticaria is a genus of beetles in the family Megalopodidae. It contains only one species, Barticaria cyaneus, found in Brazil and Guyana.
