= Temnaspis =

Scientific classification
- Domain: Eukaryota
- Kingdom: Animalia
- Phylum: Arthropoda
- Class: Insecta
- Order: Coleoptera
- Suborder: Polyphaga
- Infraorder: Cucujiformia
- Family: Megalopodidae
- Subfamily: Megalopodinae
- Genus: Temnaspis; Lacordaire, 1845

Type species
- Megalopus javanus Guérin-Méneville, 1844

Synonyms
- Colobaspis Fairmaire, 1894

Genus of beetles

Temnaspis is a genus of beetles in the family Megalopodidae, containing the following species:

- Temnaspis amabilis (Baly, 1878)
- Temnaspis arida Westwood, 1864
- Temnaspis ashlocki Kimoto & Gressitt, 1979
- Temnaspis atrithorax (Pic, 1934)
- Temnaspis bengalensis Westwood, 1864
- Temnaspis bicoloripennis Pic, 1950
- Temnaspis bidentatus Pic, 1922
- Temnaspis bifasciata Mohamedsaid, 1999
- Temnaspis bonneuili Pic, 1947
- Temnaspis brunneipennis Pic, 1926
- Temnaspis centromaculata Medvedev & Sprecher-Uebersax, 1997
- Temnaspis chrysopyga Westwood, 1864
- Temnaspis cumingii Westwood, 1864
- Temnaspis dohrni Jacoby, 1899
- Temnaspis elegans Chujo, 1951
- Temnaspis femorata (Gressitt, 1942)
- Temnaspis flavicornis Jacoby, 1892
- Temnaspis flavonigra (Fairmaire, 1894)
- Temnaspis formosana (Reineck, 1923)
- Temnaspis fraxini (Komiya, 1986)
- Temnaspis humeralis Jacoby, 1890
- Temnaspis insignis Baly, 1859
- Temnaspis japanica Baly, 1873
- Temnaspis javanus (Guérin-Méneville, 1844)
- Temnaspis kuntzeni Reineck, 1913
- Temnaspis kwangtungensis (Gressitt, 1942)
- Temnaspis lugubris Westwood, 1864
- Temnaspis lunduensis Mohamedsaid, 2005
- Temnaspis nankinea (Pic, 1914)
- Temnaspis nigriceps Baly, 1859
- Temnaspis nigricollis Jacoby, 1899
- Temnaspis nigroplagiata Jacoby, 1892
- Temnaspis nigropunctata (Pic, 1896)
- Temnaspis omeiensis (Gressitt, 1942)
- Temnaspis pallida (Gressitt, 1942)
- Temnaspis pua Li & Liang, 2013
- Temnaspis pulcher Baly, 1859
- Temnaspis purpureotinctus Medvedev, 2002
- Temnaspis quadriplagiata Bryant, 1934
- Temnaspis regalis (Achard, 1920)
- Temnaspis rubens (Klug, 1834)
- Temnaspis sanguinicollis Chen & Pu, 1962
- Temnaspis sauteri (Reineck, 1923)
- Temnaspis septemmaculata (Hope, 1831)
- Temnaspis shirakii (Chujo, 1932)
- Temnaspis speciosus Baly, 1859
- Temnaspis squalida Allard, 1892
- Temnaspis syringa Li & Liang, 2013
- Temnaspis testacea (Gressitt & Kimoto, 1961)
- Temnaspis testaceoapicalis Pic, 1955
- Temnaspis vietnamensis Medvedev, 1985
- Temnaspis vitalisi (Pic, 1922)
- Temnaspis westwoodii Baly, 1865
