= Plesioagathomerus =

Scientific classification
- Domain: Eukaryota
- Kingdom: Animalia
- Phylum: Arthropoda
- Class: Insecta
- Order: Coleoptera
- Suborder: Polyphaga
- Infraorder: Cucujiformia
- Family: Megalopodidae
- Subfamily: Megalopodinae
- Genus: Plesioagathomerus; Monrós, 1945

Type species
- Plesioagathomerus vittatus Monrós, 1945

Genus of beetles

Plesioagathomerus is a genus of beetles in the family Megalopodidae, containing the following species:

- Plesioagathomerus atrodiscalis Pic, 1947
- Plesioagathomerus bilineatus Pic, 1947
- Plesioagathomerus canus Monrós, 1945
- Plesioagathomerus vittatus Monrós, 1945
