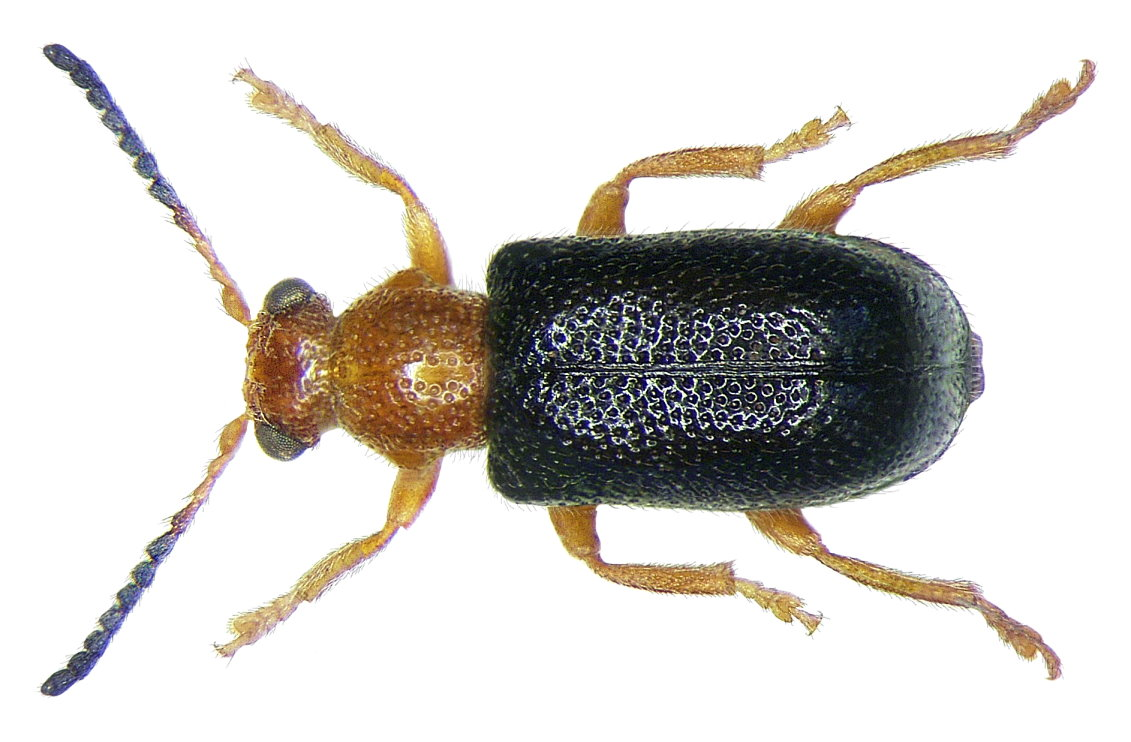
- Zeugophora subspinosa

Scientific classification
- Domain: Eukaryota
- Kingdom: Animalia
- Phylum: Arthropoda
- Class: Insecta
- Order: Coleoptera
- Suborder: Polyphaga
- Infraorder: Cucujiformia
- Family: Megalopodidae
- Subfamily: Zeugophorinae
- Genus: Zeugophora; Kunze, 1818

Type species
- Crioceris subspinosa Fabricius, 1781

Synonyms
- Auchenia Thunberg, 1792 (name suppressed); Austrolema Oke, 1932; Bruchomima Achard, 1916; Macrozeugophora Achard, 1914; Pedrillia Westwood, 1864; Pedrilliomorpha Pic, 1917; Pedrillimorpha Papp, 1946 (unavailable name); Pedrilonga Papp, 1946 (unavailable name); Pedrinella Papp, 1946 (unavailable name); Papuleptura Gressitt, 1959; Taraxis LeConte, 1850

= Zeugophora =

Genus of beetles

Zeugophora is a genus of beetles in the family Megalopodidae, containing the following species:

- Zeugophora abnormis (J. L. LeConte, 1850)
- Zeugophora aethiops Medvedev, 1995
- Zeugophora africana (Bryant, 1943)
- Zeugophora albiseta Reid, 1989
- Zeugophora alticola (Gressitt, 1959)
- Zeugophora ancora Reitter, 1900
- Zeugophora annulata (Baly, 1873)
- Zeugophora apicata Medvedev, 2007
- Zeugophora atra Fall, 1926
- Zeugophora atrosuturalis (Pic, 1917)
- Zeugophora belokobylskii Lopatin, 1995
- Zeugophora bicolor (Kraatz, 1879)
- Zeugophora bicoloripes Pic, 1939
- Zeugophora bifasciata Gressitt & Kimoto, 1961
- Zeugophora bimaculata Kraatz, 1879
- Zeugophora bistriolata Schöller, 2009
- Zeugophora brancucii Medvedev, 1993
- Zeugophora buonloicus Medvedev, 1985
- Zeugophora californica Crotch, 1874
- Zeugophora cameroonica Medvedev, 1998
- Zeugophora capensis (Bryant, 1943)
- Zeugophora carolae Gressitt, 1965
- Zeugophora chinensis Medvedev, 1998
- Zeugophora chloropelta (Achard, 1916)
- Zeugophora chujoi Ohno, 1961
- Zeugophora consanguinea Crotch, 1873
- Zeugophora crassicornis Medvedev, 1998
- Zeugophora cribrata Chen, 1974
- Zeugophora cupka Takemoto, 2019
- Zeugophora cyanea Chen, 1974
- Zeugophora daccordii Schöller, 2009
- Zeugophora decorata (Chujo, 1937)
- Zeugophora dimorpha (Gressitt, 1945)
- Zeugophora emeica Li & Liang, 2018
- Zeugophora enduwakombukoensis Sekerka, 2007
- Zeugophora euonymorum Li & Liang, 2020
- Zeugophora fasciata Medvedev, 1998
- Zeugophora flavicollis (Marsha, 1802)
- Zeugophora flavitarsis Medvedev, 1998
- Zeugophora flavithorax Li & Liang, 2020
- Zeugophora flavonotata (Chujo, 1935)
- Zeugophora formosana (Gressitt, 1954)
- Zeugophora frontalis Suffrian, 1840
- Zeugophora gede Reid, 1998
- Zeugophora gracilis (Chujo, 1937)
- Zeugophora hanungus Medvedev, 1985
- Zeugophora himalayana Medvedev, 1998
- Zeugophora hozumii Chujo, 1953
- Zeugophora humeralis (Achard, 1914)
- Zeugophora impressa Chen & Pu, 1962
- Zeugophora indica Jacoby, 1903
- Zeugophora japanica Chujo, 1951
- Zeugophora javana Reid, 1992
- Zeugophora kwaiensis (Weise, 1900)
- Zeugophora longicornis (Westwood, 1864)
- Zeugophora luzonica (Weise, 1922)
- Zeugophora maai Kimoto & Gressitt, 1979
- Zeugophora maculata (Chujo, 1941)
- Zeugophora madagascariensis (Jacoby, 1897)
- Zeugophora medvedevi Lopatin, 2002
- Zeugophora multisignata (Pic, 1944)
- Zeugophora multnomah Hatch, 1971
- Zeugophora murrayi (Clark, 1865)
- Zeugophora neomexicana Schaeffer, 1919
- Zeugophora nepalica Medvedev, 1988
- Zeugophora nigricollis (Jacoby, 1885)
- Zeugophora nigroaerea Lopatin, 2008
- Zeugophora nigroapica Li & Liang, 2018
- Zeugophora nigrocincta (Pic, 1924)
- Zeugophora nitida (Chujo, 1932)
- Zeugophora novobicolor Rodríguez-Mirón, 2018
- Zeugophora ornata (Achard, 1914)
- Zeugophora pallidicincta Gressitt, 1945
- Zeugophora papuana Medvedev, 2009
- Zeugophora parva Crowson, 1946
- Zeugophora puberula Crotch, 1873
- Zeugophora riedeli Medvedev, 2007
- Zeugophora ruficollis (Chujo, 1932)
- Zeugophora scutellaris Suffrian, 1840
- Zeugophora setsukoae Gressitt, 1965
- Zeugophora subspinosa (Fabricius, 1781)
- Zeugophora sumatrana (Jacoby, 1896)
- Zeugophora suturalis (Achard, 1914)
- Zeugophora testaceipes (Pic, 1939)
- Zeugophora tetraspilota Medvedev, 1998
- Zeugophora tricolor Chen & Pu, 1962
- Zeugophora trifasciata Li & Liang, 2020
- Zeugophora trisignata An & Kwon, 2002
- Zeugophora turneri Power, 1863
- Zeugophora unifasciata (Jacoby, 1885)
- Zeugophora variabilis (Achard, 1914)
- Zeugophora varians Crotch, 1873
- Zeugophora varipes (Jacoby, 1885)
- Zeugophora vitinea (Oke, 1932)
- Zeugophora weisei Reitter, 1889
- Zeugophora williamsi Reid, 1989
- Zeugophora wittmeri Medvedev, 1993
- Zeugophora xanthopoda Bezdek & Silfverberg, 2010
- Zeugophora yuae Li and Liang, 2020
- Zeugophora yunnanica Chen & Pu, 1962
