= Homalopterus =

Scientific classification
- Domain: Eukaryota
- Kingdom: Animalia
- Phylum: Arthropoda
- Class: Insecta
- Order: Coleoptera
- Suborder: Polyphaga
- Infraorder: Cucujiformia
- Family: Megalopodidae
- Subfamily: Megalopodinae
- Genus: Homalopterus; Perty, 1832

Type species
- Homalopterus tristis Perty, 1832

Genus of beetles

Homalopterus is a genus of beetles in the family Megalopodidae, containing the following species:

- ?Homalopterus atrovirens Papp, 1952
- Homalopterus heteroproctus Lacordaire, 1845
- Homalopterus tristis Perty, 1832
