= Macrolopha =

Scientific classification
- Domain: Eukaryota
- Kingdom: Animalia
- Phylum: Arthropoda
- Class: Insecta
- Order: Coleoptera
- Suborder: Polyphaga
- Infraorder: Cucujiformia
- Family: Megalopodidae
- Subfamily: Megalopodinae
- Genus: Macrolopha; Weise, 1902

Type species
- Macrolopha rustica Weise, 1902

Subgenera
- Incisolopha Pic, 1951; Macrolopha Weise, 1902

Genus of beetles

Macrolopha is a genus of beetles in the family Megalopodidae, containing the following species:

- Subgenus Incisolopha Pic, 1951
  - Macrolopha transversicollis Pic, 1951
- Subgenus Macrolopha Weise, 1902
  - Macrolopha aeneipennis (Weise, 1915)
  - Macrolopha apicata (Fairmaire, 1887)
  - Macrolopha atricornis Pic, 1951
  - Macrolopha bicolor (Jacoby, 1901)
  - Macrolopha bicoloripennis Pic, 1951
  - Macrolopha biflavomaculata Pic, 1953
  - Macrolopha brunneonotata Pic, 1951
  - Macrolopha carinata (Bryant, 1930)
  - Macrolopha centromaculata (Jacoby, 1894)
  - Macrolopha costatipennis (Pic, 1937)
  - Macrolopha cribricollis Pic, 1951
  - Macrolopha dentipes Weise, 1902
  - Macrolopha dollmani (Bryant, 1930)
  - Macrolopha flavofasciata (Pic, 1945)
  - Macrolopha hargreavesi (Bryant, 1930)
  - Macrolopha insignata Pic, 1951
  - Macrolopha interrupta (Pic, 1947)
  - Macrolopha jacobyi Weise, 1902
  - Macrolopha luteofasciata Pic, 1951
  - Macrolopha major Pic, 1955
  - Macrolopha mashuana (Jacoby, 1895)
  - Macrolopha minuta Pic, 1951
  - Macrolopha murrayi (Baly, 1859)
  - Macrolopha neavei (Bryant, 1930)
  - Macrolopha notaticollis (Pic, 1952)
  - Macrolopha nyassae (Bryant, 1930)
  - Macrolopha parvula (Westwood, 1864)
  - Macrolopha quadrimaculata Gahan, 1909
  - Macrolopha rustica Weise, 1902
  - Macrolopha subfasciata Pic, 1951
  - Macrolopha suturalis (Clavareau, 1909)
  - Macrolopha theresae (Pic, 1947)
  - Macrolopha tricoloripes (Pic, 1927)
  - Macrolopha variabilis (Westwood, 1864)

Furthermore, the following species has been recently transferred to this genus from Poecilomorpha:

- Macrolopha aureovillosa (Jacoby, 1894)
