= Zeugophora varians =

Scientific classification
- Domain: Eukaryota
- Kingdom: Animalia
- Phylum: Arthropoda
- Class: Insecta
- Order: Coleoptera
- Suborder: Polyphaga
- Infraorder: Cucujiformia
- Family: Megalopodidae
- Genus: Zeugophora
- Species: Z. varians

Binomial name
- Zeugophora varians Crotch, 1873

Species of beetle

Zeugophora varians is a species of megalopodid leaf beetle in the family Megalopodidae. It is found in North America.
