= Zeugophora abnormis =

Scientific classification
- Kingdom: Animalia
- Phylum: Arthropoda
- Clade: Pancrustacea
- Class: Insecta
- Order: Coleoptera
- Suborder: Polyphaga
- Infraorder: Cucujiformia
- Family: Megalopodidae
- Genus: Zeugophora
- Species: Z. abnormis

Binomial name
- Zeugophora abnormis (J. L. LeConte, 1850)

Species of beetle

Zeugophora abnormis is a species of megalopodid leaf beetle in the family Megalopodidae. It is found in North America.
