= Megalopus =

Scientific classification
- Domain: Eukaryota
- Kingdom: Animalia
- Phylum: Arthropoda
- Class: Insecta
- Order: Coleoptera
- Suborder: Polyphaga
- Infraorder: Cucujiformia
- Family: Megalopodidae
- Subfamily: Megalopodinae
- Genus: Megalopus; Fabricius, 1801

Type species
- Megalopus ruficornis Fabricius, 1801

Subgenera
- Falsomegalopus Pic, 1916; Megalopus Fabricius, 1801; Mucromegalopus Pic, 1916

Genus of beetles

Megalopus is a genus of beetles in the family Megalopodidae, containing the following species:

- Subgenus Falsomegalopus Pic, 1916
  - Megalopus apicalis Pic, 1916
  - Megalopus diformipes Pic, 1916
  - Megalopus guyanensis Pic, 1916
  - Megalopus incisus Pic, 1916
  - Megalopus parallelus Lacordaire, 1845
- Subgenus Megalopus Fabricius, 1801
  - Megalopus analis Klug, 1824
  - Megalopus angustatus Lacordaire, 1845
  - Megalopus annulipes Pic, 1916
  - Megalopus basalis Jacoby, 1892
  - Megalopus brasiliensis Jacoby, 1903
  - Megalopus brevipennis Jacoby, 1903
  - Megalopus calcaratus Lacordaire, 1845
  - Megalopus cruralis Klug, 1824
  - Megalopus dentipes Bates, 1866
  - Megalopus elongatus Baly, 1876
  - Megalopus femoratus Serville, 1825
  - Megalopus flavofasciatus Clark, 1866
  - Megalopus foveifrons Pic, 1948
  - Megalopus hirtipes Klug, 1824
  - Megalopus impictus Bates, 1866
  - Megalopus inscriptus Klug, 1824
  - Megalopus lituratus Klug, 1834
  - Megalopus luteosignatus Pic, 1940
  - Megalopus melipona Clark, 1866
  - Megalopus nigricornis Fabricius, 1801
  - Megalopus nigrovittatus Jacoby, 1873
  - Megalopus poecilosomus Lacordaire, 1845
  - Megalopus ruficornis Fabricius, 1801
  - Megalopus seriatus Lacordaire, 1845
  - Megalopus sexvittatus Bates, 1866
  - Megalopus szantoi Papp, 1951
  - Megalopus tabidus Klug, 1834
  - Megalopus thoracicus Jacoby, 1903
  - Megalopus tuberculatus Klug, 1834
  - Megalopus unifasciatus Pic, 1916
  - Megalopus violaceofasciatus Jacoby, 1888
  - Megalopus vittaticollis Baly, 1876
  - Megalopus waterhousei Baly, 1859
- Subgenus Mucromegalopus Pic, 1916
  - Megalopus armatus Lacordaire, 1845
  - Megalopus atripennis Pic, 1916
  - Megalopus boliviensis Pic, 1954
  - Megalopus buckleyi Jacoby, 1889
  - Megalopus jacobyi Bruch, 1908
  - Megalopus monstrosicornis Pic, 1916
  - Megalopus schaeferi Monrós, 1947
  - Megalopus vespa Monrós, 1947
