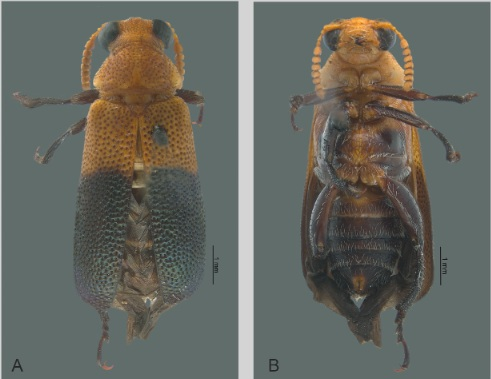

Scientific classification
- Kingdom: Animalia
- Phylum: Arthropoda
- Class: Insecta
- Order: Coleoptera
- Suborder: Polyphaga
- Infraorder: Cucujiformia
- Family: Megalopodidae
- Genus: Poecilomorpha
- Species: P. cribricollis

Binomial name
- Poecilomorpha cribricollis (Pic, 1951)

Synonyms
- Macrolopha cribricollis Pic, 1951

= Poecilomorpha cribricollis =

Species of beetle

Poecilomorpha cribricollis is a species of beetle in the family Megalopodidae. This species is found in the Democratic Republic of the Congo.

Adults reach a length of about 7.4 mm. The head, antennae, pronotum and elytra basal thirds are orange, while the apical two-thirds of the elytra is iridescent black. The mandibles, legs and abdomen are brown.
