= Macroantonaria =

Scientific classification
- Kingdom: Animalia
- Phylum: Arthropoda
- Class: Insecta
- Order: Coleoptera
- Suborder: Polyphaga
- Infraorder: Cucujiformia
- Family: Megalopodidae
- Subfamily: Megalopodinae
- Genus: Macroantonaria; Pic, 1951
- Species: M. robustipes

Binomial name
- Macroantonaria robustipes Pic, 1951

Genus of beetles

Macroantonaria is a genus of beetles in the family Megalopodidae. It contains only one species, Macroantonaria robustipes, found in the Democratic Republic of the Congo.
