= Leucastea =

Scientific classification
- Domain: Eukaryota
- Kingdom: Animalia
- Phylum: Arthropoda
- Class: Insecta
- Order: Coleoptera
- Suborder: Polyphaga
- Infraorder: Cucujiformia
- Family: Megalopodidae
- Subfamily: Megalopodinae
- Genus: Leucastea; Stål, 1855

Type species
- Leucastea dohrni Stål, 1855

Genus of beetles

Leucastea is a genus of beetles in the family Megalopodidae, containing the following species:

- Leucastea alluaudi Pic, 1944
- Leucastea antennata Weise, 1909
- Leucastea antica Westwood, 1864
- Leucastea atrimembris Pic, 1933
- Leucastea atripennis Westwood, 1864
- Leucastea biformis Weise, 1919
- Leucastea bimaculata Jacoby, 1900
- Leucastea concolor Westwood, 1864
- Leucastea dahomeyensis Jacoby, 1901
- Leucastea dimidiata Westwood, 1864
- Leucastea dohrni Stål, 1855
- Leucastea donckieri Pic, 1913
- Leucastea ephippiata Westwood, 1864
- Leucastea fairmairei (Stål, 1855)
- Leucastea femoralis Weise, 1919
- Leucastea fenestrata Weise, 1919
- Leucastea fulvipennis (Baly, 1855)
- Leucastea letestui Pic, 1944
- Leucastea lugens Stål, 1855
- Leucastea maculatipes Pic, 1913
- Leucastea nana Stål, 1855
- Leucastea nigroapicalis Pic, 1940
- Leucastea occipitalis Weise, 1902
- Leucastea plagiata (Klug, 1834)
- Leucastea rubidipennnis Westwood, 1864
- Leucastea senegalensis (Lacordaire, 1845)
- Leucastea sjostedtii Weise, 1909
- Leucastea stibapicalis Pic, 1944
- Leucastea westermanni Westwood, 1864

Furthermore, the following species have been recently transferred to this genus from Poecilomorpha:

- Leucastea apicalis (Pic, 1951)
- Leucastea atricornis (Pic, 1951)
- Leucastea curta (Pic, 1951)
- Leucastea fasciaticeps (Pic, 1951)
- Leucastea immaculatipes (Pic, 1951)
- Leucastea impressipennis (Pic, 1951)
- Leucastea laticornis (Pic, 1951)
- Leucastea nigroapicalis (Pic, 1951)
- Leucastea nigromaculata (Pic, 1951)
- Leucastea overlaeti (Pic, 1951)
- Leucastea testaceipennis (Pic, 1917)
- Leucastea trimaculata (Pic, 1951)
- Leucastea usambarica (Weise, 1902)
