= Kuilua =

Scientific classification
- Domain: Eukaryota
- Kingdom: Animalia
- Phylum: Arthropoda
- Class: Insecta
- Order: Coleoptera
- Suborder: Polyphaga
- Infraorder: Cucujiformia
- Family: Megalopodidae
- Subfamily: Megalopodinae
- Genus: Kuilua; Jacoby, 1894

Type species
- Kuilua africana Jacoby, 1894

Genus of beetles

Kuilua is a genus of beetles in the family Megalopodidae, containing the following species:

- Kuilua africana Jacoby, 1894
- Kuilua apicicornis Pic, 1930
- Kuilua brevior Pic, 1917
- Kuilua ertli Weise, 1919
- Kuilua loveni Weise, 1926
- Kuilua reducta Pic, 1949
