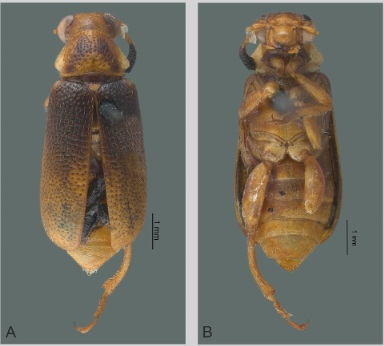

Scientific classification
- Kingdom: Animalia
- Phylum: Arthropoda
- Class: Insecta
- Order: Coleoptera
- Suborder: Polyphaga
- Infraorder: Cucujiformia
- Family: Megalopodidae
- Genus: Poecilomorpha
- Species: P. minuta

Binomial name
- Poecilomorpha minuta (Pic, 1951)

Synonyms
- Macrolopha minuta Pic, 1951

= Poecilomorpha minuta =

Species of beetle

Poecilomorpha minuta is a species of beetle in the family Megalopodidae. This species is found in the Democratic Republic of the Congo.

They are entirely yellow orange, except for the black antennae and the apex of mandibles (which is brown). Furthermore, the elytral basal thirds is iridescent brown.
