= Sphondylia =

Scientific classification
- Domain: Eukaryota
- Kingdom: Animalia
- Phylum: Arthropoda
- Class: Insecta
- Order: Coleoptera
- Suborder: Polyphaga
- Infraorder: Cucujiformia
- Family: Megalopodidae
- Subfamily: Megalopodinae
- Genus: Sphondylia; Weise, 1902

Type species
- Sphondylia magnicollis Weise, 1902

Genus of beetles

Sphondylia is a genus of beetles in the family Megalopodidae, containing the following species:

- Sphondylia afer (Klug, 1824) (syn: Poecilomorpha abyssinica Pic, 1951 and Poecilomorpha delagoensis Pic, 1913)
- Sphondylia angolensis Weise, 1919
- Sphondylia atricornis Pic, 1951
- Sphondylia balyana (Westwood, 1864)
- Sphondylia barbipes Weise, 1915
- Sphondylia basalis Clavareau, 1909
- Sphondylia bicoloriventris Pic, 1937
- Sphondylia fasciaticollis (Jacoby, 1901)
- Sphondylia henrardi Pic, 1951
- Sphondylia inlineata Pic, 1939
- Sphondylia jacobyi Clavareau, 1905
- Sphondylia lineatithorax Pic, 1953
- Sphondylia magnicollis Weise, 1902
- Sphondylia mutillaria (Clark, 1865)
- Sphondylia pubimaculata Erber & Medvedev, 2002
- Sphondylia schulzi Weise, 1902
- Sphondylia sobrina (Harold, 1880)
- Sphondylia testacea Pic, 1912
- Sphondylia thoreyi (Baly, 1864)
- Sphondylia tomentosa (Lacordaire, 1845)
- Sphondylia vaneyeni Pic, 1951
- Sphondylia varians Weise, 1919
- Sphondylia ventralis Weise, 1902

Furthermore, the following species have been recently transferred to this genus from Poecilomorpha:

- Sphondylia diversipes (Pic, 1951)
- Sphondylia trilineata (Erber & Medvedev, 2002)
- Sphondylia gravastella (Péringuey, 1908)
