= Nickimerus =

Scientific classification
- Domain: Eukaryota
- Kingdom: Animalia
- Phylum: Arthropoda
- Class: Insecta
- Order: Coleoptera
- Suborder: Polyphaga
- Infraorder: Cucujiformia
- Family: Megalopodidae
- Subfamily: Megalopodinae
- Genus: Nickimerus; Guérin, 1948
- Species: N. setosus

Binomial name
- Nickimerus setosus Guérin, 1948

Genus of beetles

Nickimerus is a genus of beetles in the family Megalopodidae. It contains only one species, Nickimerus setosus, found in Brazil.
