= Antonaria =

Scientific classification
- Domain: Eukaryota
- Kingdom: Animalia
- Phylum: Arthropoda
- Class: Insecta
- Order: Coleoptera
- Suborder: Polyphaga
- Infraorder: Cucujiformia
- Family: Megalopodidae
- Subfamily: Megalopodinae
- Genus: Antonaria; Jacoby & Clavareau, 1905

Type species
- Poecilomorpha murina Westwood, 1864

Genus of beetles

Antonaria is a genus of beetles in the family Megalopodidae, containing the following species:

- Antonaria albonotata Pic, 1912
- Antonaria burgeoni Pic, 1951
- Antonaria dentata Erber & Medvedev, 2002
- Antonaria favareli Pic, 1946
- Antonaria femorata Clavareau, 1905
- Antonaria fulvicornis (Jacoby, 1901)
- Antonaria ghesquierei Pic, 1951
- Antonaria hirsuta (Jacoby, 1898)
- Antonaria humeralis Weise, 1912
- Antonaria leroyi Pic, 1951
- Antonaria modesta (Jacoby, 1894)
- Antonaria murina (Westwood, 1864)
- Antonaria pallidipennis Pic, 1951
- Antonaria quadrinotata Pic, 1951
- Antonaria suturella Weise, 1915
- Antonaria testaceipes Pic, 1930
- Antonaria tibialis Erber & Medvedev, 2002
- Antonaria varicolor (Jacoby, 1894)
