= Monrosolopha =

Scientific classification
- Domain: Eukaryota
- Kingdom: Animalia
- Phylum: Arthropoda
- Class: Insecta
- Order: Coleoptera
- Suborder: Polyphaga
- Infraorder: Cucujiformia
- Family: Megalopodidae
- Subfamily: Megalopodinae
- Genus: Monrosolopha; Erber & Medvedev, 2002

Genus of beetles

Monrosolopha is a genus of beetles in the family Megalopodidae.

== Species ==
- Monrosolopha obscura Erber & Medvedev, 2002
- Monrosolopha tarsata (Bryant, 1941)
