= Megalopodinae =

Scientific classification
- Kingdom: Animalia
- Phylum: Arthropoda
- Class: Insecta
- Order: Coleoptera
- Suborder: Polyphaga
- Infraorder: Cucujiformia
- Superfamily: Chrysomeloidea
- Family: Megalopodidae
- Subfamily: Megalopodinae; Latreille, 1802

Subfamily of beetles

The beetle subfamily Megalopodinae is the largest group within the family Megalopodidae. Species in the subfamily are mostly tropical in distribution, and their larvae typically bore inside of plant stems.

It contains the following genera:

- Agathomerus Lacordaire, 1845
- Antonaria Jacoby & Clavareau, 1905
- Ateledera Lacordaire, 1845
- Barticaria Jacoby & Clavareau, 1905
- Bothromegalopus Monrós, 1947
- Bryantonaria Pic, 1951
- Falsocolobaspis Pic, 1942
- Falsotemnaspis Pic, 1951
- Homalopterus Perty, 1832
- Kuilua Jacoby, 1894
- Leucastea Stål, 1855
- Macroantonaria Pic, 1951
- Macrolopha Weise, 1902
- Mastostethus Lacordaire, 1845
- Megalopus Fabricius, 1801
- Mimocolobaspis Pic, 1951
- Monrosolopha Erber & Medvedev, 2002
- Nickimerus Guérin, 1948
- Piomelopus Jacoby & Clavareau, 1905
- Plesioagathomerus Monrós, 1945
- Poecilomorpha Hope, 1840
- Pseudohomalopterus Pic, 1920
- Pseudomegalopus Pic, 1916
- Sphondylia Weise, 1902
- Temnaspis Lacordaire, 1845
