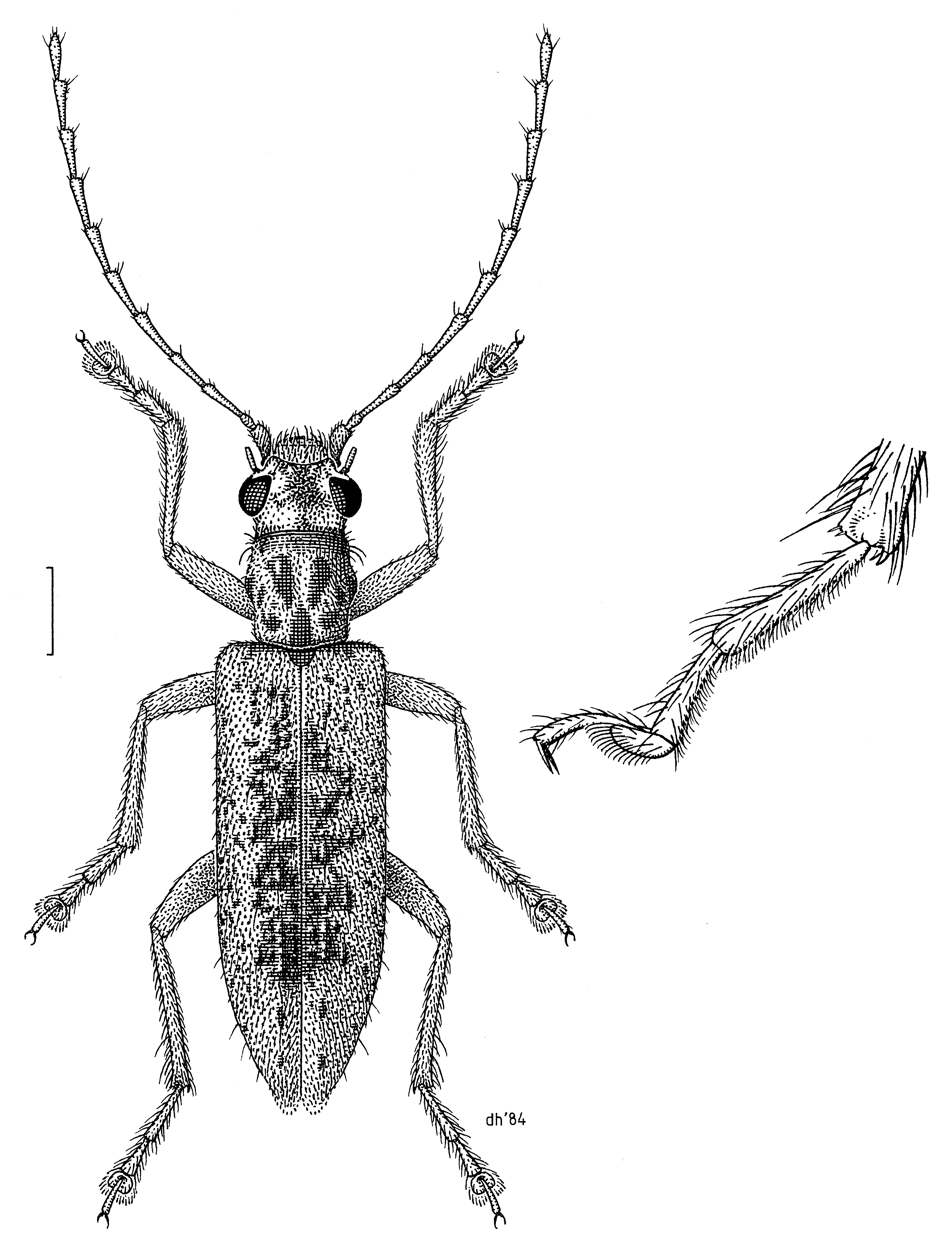
- Palophagus bunyae

Scientific classification
- Domain: Eukaryota
- Kingdom: Animalia
- Phylum: Arthropoda
- Class: Insecta
- Order: Coleoptera
- Suborder: Polyphaga
- Infraorder: Cucujiformia
- Family: Megalopodidae
- Subfamily: Palophaginae; Kuschel & May, 1990

= Palophaginae =

Palophaginae Temporal range: Eocene–Recent

Subfamily of beetles

Palophaginae is a small beetle subfamily within the family Megalopodidae. It contains two tribes, with five species in four genera:

- Tribe Palophagini Kuschel & May, 1990
  - Genus Cucujopsis Crowson, 1946
    - Cucujopsis setifer Crowson, 1946
  - Genus Palophagoides Kuschel in Kuschel & May, 1996
    - Palophagoides vargasorum Kuschel in Kuschel & May, 1996
  - Genus Palophagus Kuschel in Kuschel & May, 1990
    - Palophagus australiensis Kuschel in Kuschel & May, 1990
    - Palophagus bunyae Kuschel in Kuschel & May, 1990
- Tribe †Lobanoviellini Kirejtshuk & Reid, 2021 Baltic amber, Eocene
  - Genus †Lobanoviella Kirejtshuk & Reid, 2021
    - †Lobanoviella andreyi Kirejtshuk & Reid, 2021
