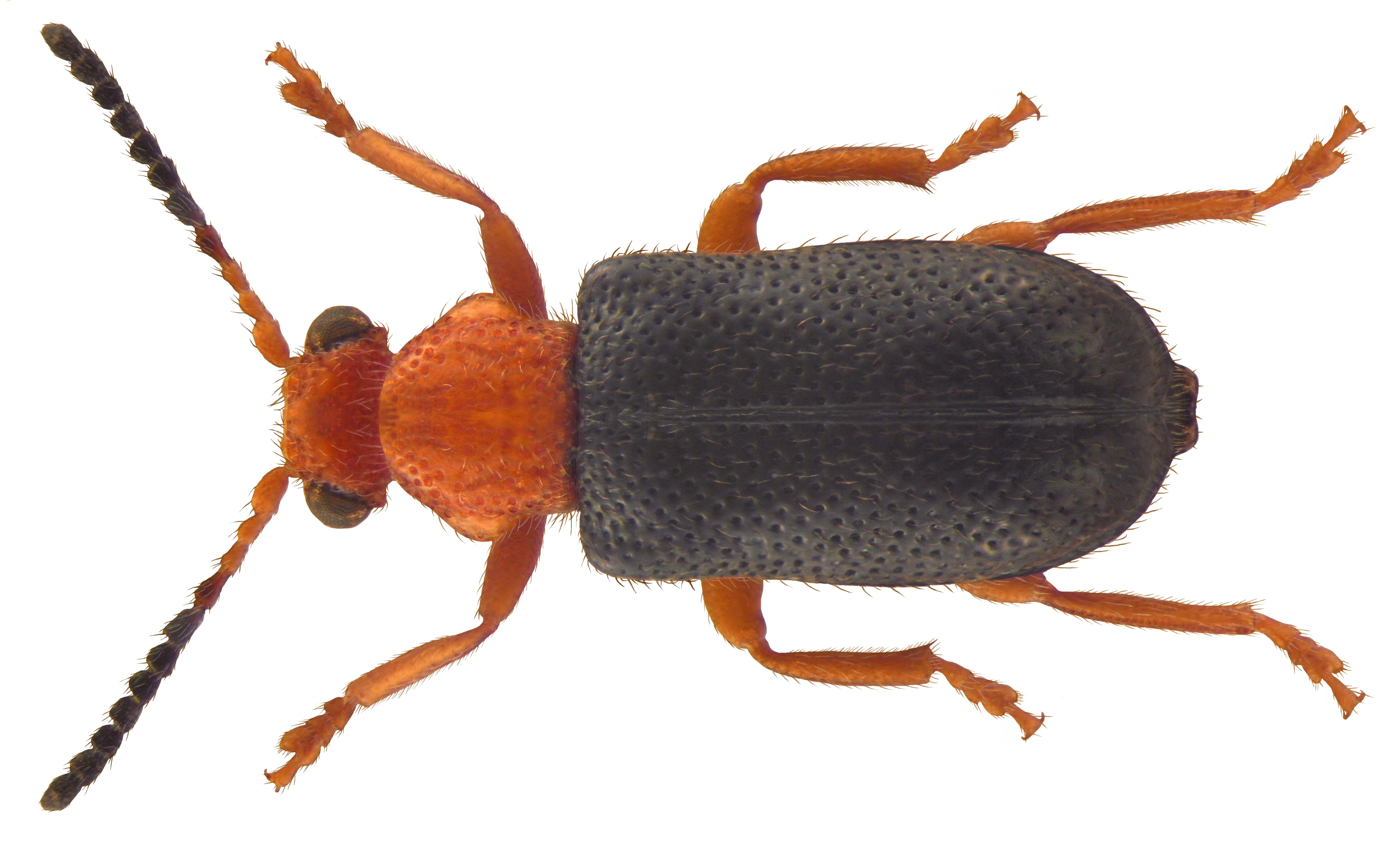
- Z. subspinosa

Scientific classification
- Kingdom: Animalia
- Phylum: Arthropoda
- Class: Insecta
- Order: Coleoptera
- Suborder: Polyphaga
- Infraorder: Cucujiformia
- Family: Megalopodidae
- Subfamily: Zeugophorinae; Böving & Craighead, 1931

= Zeugophorinae =

Subfamily of beetles

Zeugophorinae is a subfamily of beetles within the family Megalopodidae. It is a small worldwide group, containing only two genera:

- Zeugophora Kunze, 1818
- Zeugophorella Sekerka, 2013
