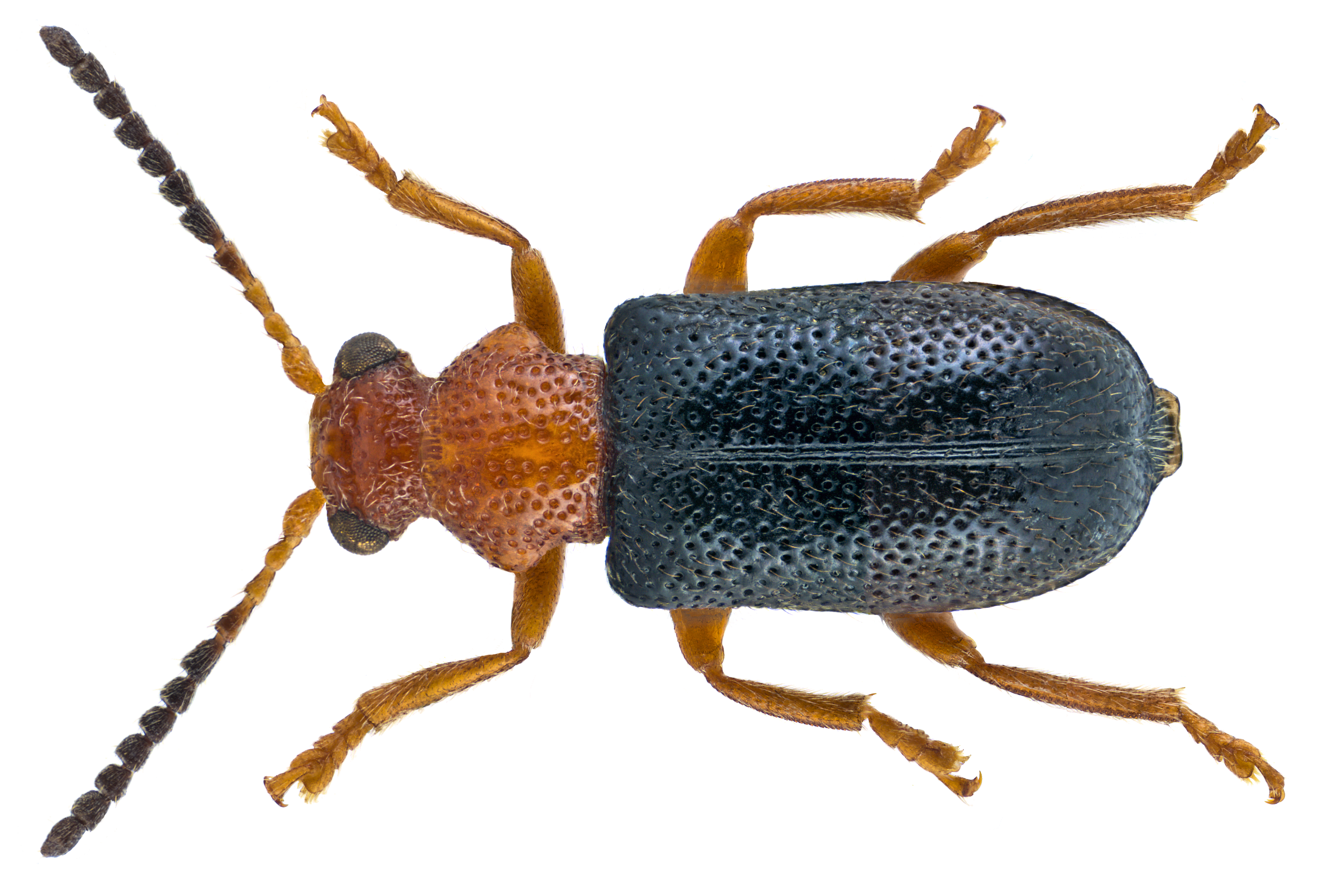
- Zeugophora subspinosa

Scientific classification
- Kingdom: Animalia
- Phylum: Arthropoda
- Clade: Pancrustacea
- Class: Insecta
- Order: Coleoptera
- Suborder: Polyphaga
- Infraorder: Cucujiformia
- Superfamily: Chrysomeloidea
- Family: Megalopodidae; Latreille, 1802

Subfamilies
- Megalopodinae; Palophaginae; Zeugophorinae

= Megalopodidae =

Family of beetles

The Megalopodidae are a small family of leaf beetles, previously included as a subfamily within the Chrysomelidae. One of its constituent subfamilies, Zeugophorinae, has also frequently been treated as a subfamily within Chrysomelidae. The family contains approximately 30 genera worldwide, primarily in the nominate subfamily Megalopodinae, and mostly circumtropical.

The larvae of some species are leaf miners on various host plants. Other larvae feed on stem-tissue or pollen grains of conifer strobili. Once fully grown, the larva drops to the ground and pupates.
