= Nemourinae =

Scientific classification
- Domain: Eukaryota
- Kingdom: Animalia
- Phylum: Arthropoda
- Class: Insecta
- Order: Plecoptera
- Family: Nemouridae
- Subfamily: Nemourinae; Billberg, 1820

Subfamily of stoneflies

Nemourinae is a subfamily of stoneflies in the family Nemouridae. Species of the Nemourinae have been recorded in the Nearctic, Palaearctic and Oriental realms.

== Genera ==
The Plecoptera Species File lists:

Genus group Nemoura

1. Illiesonemoura Baumann, 1975
2. Nemoura Latreille, 1796
3. Sinonemura Mo, Li & Murányi, 2020
4. Zapada Ricker, 1952

Other genera

1. †Balticonemoura Chen, 2021
2. Lednia Ricker, 1952
3. Nanonemoura Baumann & Fiala, 2001
4. Nemurella Kempny, 1898
5. Ostrocerca Ricker, 1952
6. Paranemoura Needham & Claassen, 1925
7. Podmosta Ricker, 1952
8. Prostoia Ricker, 1952
9. Shipsa Ricker, 1952
10. Soyedina Ricker, 1952
11. Visoka Ricker, 1952
