= List of Nemoura species =

This is a list of 193 species in the genus Nemoura, a genus of spring stoneflies in the family Nemouridae.

== Nemoura species ==
- Nemoura abscissa Zwick, P., 1977^{c g}
- Nemoura aetolica Zwick, P., 1978^{c g}
- Nemoura akagii Kawai, 1960^{c g}
- Nemoura alaica Zhiltzova, 1976^{c g}
- Nemoura almaatensis Zhiltzova, 1979^{c g}
- Nemoura anas Murányi, 2007^{c g}
- Nemoura anguiculus Shimizu, 1997^{c g}
- Nemoura apicalis Sivec & Stark, 2010^{c g}
- Nemoura apollo Zwick, P., 1978^{c g}
- Nemoura aquila Murányi, 2011^{c g}
- Nemoura arctica Esben-Petersen, 1910^{i c g}
- Nemoura arlingtoni Wu, C.F., 1939^{c g}
- Nemoura asceta Murányi, 2007^{c g}
- Nemoura atristrigata Li, Weihai & D. Yang, 2007^{c g}
- Nemoura auberti Zwick, P., 1977^{c g}
- Nemoura avicularis Morton, 1894^{c g}
- Nemoura babai Kawai, 1966^{c g}
- Nemoura babiagorensis Sowa, 1964^{c g}
- Nemoura baiyunshana Li, Weihai, G. Wang & D. Yang, 2012^{c g}
- Nemoura basispina Li, Weihai & D. Yang, 2006^{c g}
- Nemoura bituberculata Kimmins, 1950^{c g}
- Nemoura bokhari Aubert, 1967^{c g}
- Nemoura braaschi Joost, 1970^{c g}
- Nemoura brachiptilus Motschulsky, 1853^{c g}
- Nemoura brevicauda Zwick, P., 1980^{c g}
- Nemoura brevilobata (Klapálek, 1912)^{c g}
- Nemoura brevipennis Martynov, 1928^{c g}
- Nemoura bulgarica Raušer, 1962^{c g}
- Nemoura caligula Zwick, P., 1978^{c g}
- Nemoura cambrica Stephens, 1836^{c g}
- Nemoura carpathica Illies, 1963^{c g}
- Nemoura caspica Aubert, 1964^{c g}
- Nemoura ceciliae Aubert, 1956^{c g}
- Nemoura cercispinosa Kawai, 1960^{c g}
- Nemoura chattriki Aubert, 1967^{c g}
- Nemoura chinonis Okamoto, 1922^{c g}
- Nemoura chugi Aubert, 1967^{c g}
- Nemoura cinerea (Retzius, 1783)^{i c g}
- Nemoura clavaloba Sivec & Stark, 2010^{c g}
- Nemoura cochleocercia Wu, C.F., 1962^{c g}
- Nemoura concava Li, Weihai & D. Yang, 2008^{c g}
- Nemoura confusa Zwick, P., 1970^{c g}
- Nemoura dentata Shimizu, 1997^{c g}
- Nemoura dentigera Shimizu, 1997^{c g}
- Nemoura despinosa Zhiltzova, 1977^{c g}
- Nemoura dromokeryx Theischinger, 1976^{c g}
- Nemoura dubitans Morton, 1894^{c g}
- Nemoura dulkeiti Zapekina-Dulkeit, 1975^{c g}
- Nemoura elegantula Martynov, 1928^{c g}
- Nemoura erratica Claassen, 1936^{c g}
- Nemoura espera Ham & Lee, 1999^{c g}
- Nemoura flaviscapa Aubert, 1956^{c g}
- Nemoura flexuosa Aubert, 1949^{c g}
- Nemoura floralis Li, Weihai & D. Yang, 2006^{c g}
- Nemoura formosana Shimizu, 1997^{c g}
- Nemoura fulva (Šámal, 1921)^{c g}
- Nemoura fulviceps Klapalek, 1902^{c g}
- Nemoura furcocauda Wu, C.F., 1973^{c g}
- Nemoura fusca Kis, 1963^{c g}
- Nemoura fusiformis Chen & Y. Du, 2017^{c g}
- Nemoura geei Wu, C.F., 1929^{c g}
- Nemoura gemma Ham & Lee, 1998^{c g}
- Nemoura genei Rambur, 1842^{c g}
- Nemoura gladiata Uéno, 1929^{c g}
- Nemoura guangdongensis Li, Weihai & D. Yang, 2006^{c g}
- Nemoura hamata Kis, 1965^{c g}
- Nemoura hamulata Zhiltzova, 1971^{c g}
- Nemoura hangchowensis Chu, 1928^{c g}
- Nemoura hesperiae Consiglio, 1960^{c g}
- Nemoura hikosan Shimizu, 2016^{c g}
- Nemoura illiesi Mendl, H., 1968^{c g}
- Nemoura indica (Needham, 1909)^{c g}
- Nemoura irani Aubert, 1964^{c g}
- Nemoura janeti Wu, C.F., 1938^{c g}
- Nemoura jejudoensis Zwick, P. & Baumann, 2011^{c g}
- Nemoura jezoensis Okamoto, 1922^{c g}
- Nemoura jilinensis Zhu, F. & D. Yang, 2003^{c g}
- Nemoura junhuae Li, Weihai & D. Yang, 2008^{c g}
- Nemoura khasanensis Teslenko, 2015^{c g}
- Nemoura khasii Aubert, 1967^{c g}
- Nemoura klapperichi Sivec, 1981^{c g}
- Nemoura kontumensis Fochetti & Ceci, 2017^{c g}
- Nemoura kopetdaghi Zhiltzova, 1976^{c g}
- Nemoura kownackorum Sowa, 1970^{c g}
- Nemoura kuhleni Aubert, 1967^{c g}
- Nemoura kuwayamai Kawai, 1966^{c g}
- Nemoura lacustris Pictet, A.E., 1865^{c g}
- Nemoura lahkipuri Aubert, 1967^{c g}
- Nemoura latilongispina Qian, Xiao, Chen & Du, 2018^{g}
- Nemoura lazoensis Zwick, P., 2010^{c g}
- Nemoura lepnevae Zhiltzova, 1971^{c g}
- Nemoura linguata Navás, 1918^{c g}
- Nemoura longicauda Kis, 1964^{c g}
- Nemoura longicercia Okamoto, 1922^{c g}
- Nemoura longilobata Shimizu, 1997^{c g}
- Nemoura lucana Nicolai & Fochetti, 1991^{c g}
- Nemoura lui Du, Y. & P. Zhou, 2008^{c g}
- Nemoura luteicornis Stephens, 1836^{c g}
- Nemoura magnicauda Zwick, P., 1980^{c g}
- Nemoura magniseta Sivec & Stark, 2010^{c g}
- Nemoura manchuriana Uéno, 1941^{c g}
- Nemoura marginata Pictet, 1836^{i c g}
- Nemoura martynovia Claassen, 1936^{c g}
- Nemoura masuensis (Li, Weihai & D. Yang, 2005)^{c g}
- Nemoura matangshanensis Wu, C.F., 1935^{c g}
- Nemoura mawlangi Aubert, 1967^{c g}
- Nemoura meniscata Li, Weihai & D. Yang, 2007^{c g}
- Nemoura mesospina Li, Weihai & D. Yang, 2008^{c g}
- Nemoura miaofengshanensis Zhu, F. & D. Yang, 2003^{c g}
- Nemoura minima Aubert, 1946^{c g}
- Nemoura monae Joost, 1977^{c g}
- Nemoura monticola Raušer, 1965^{c g}
- Nemoura mortoni Ris, 1902^{c g}
- Nemoura moselyi Despax, 1934^{c g}
- Nemoura mucronata Li, Weihai & D. Yang, 2008^{c g}
- Nemoura nankinensis Wu, C.F., 1926^{c g}
- Nemoura naraiensis Kawai, 1954^{c g}
- Nemoura needhamia Wu, C.F., 1927^{c g}
- Nemoura neospiniloba Sivec & Stark, 2010^{c g}
- Nemoura nepalensis Zwick, P., 1980^{c g}
- Nemoura nervosa Pictet, F.J., 1836^{c g}
- Nemoura nigritarsis Pictet, F.J., 1836^{c g}
- Nemoura nigrodentata Zhiltzova, 1980^{c g}
- Nemoura normani Ricker, 1952^{i c g}
- Nemoura obtusa Ris, 1902^{c g}
- Nemoura oculata Wang, Z. & Y. Du, 2006^{c g}
- Nemoura oropensis Ravizza, C. & Ravizza Dematteis, 1980^{c g}
- Nemoura ovocercia Kawai, 1960^{c g}
- Nemoura ovoidalis Kis, 1965^{c g}
- Nemoura palliventris Aubert, 1953^{c g}
- Nemoura papilla Okamoto, 1922^{c g}
- Nemoura parafulva Zhiltzova, 1981^{c g}
- Nemoura perforata Li, Weihai & D. Yang, 2006^{c g}
- Nemoura peristeri Aubert, 1963^{c g}
- Nemoura persica Zwick, P., 1980^{c g}
- Nemoura pesarinii Ravizza, C. & Ravizza Dematteis, 1979^{c g}
- Nemoura petegariensis Kawai, 1971^{c g}
- Nemoura phasianusa Ham, 2009^{c g}
- Nemoura pirinensis Raušer, 1962^{c g}
- Nemoura pseudoerratica Vinçon & Pardo, 2003^{c g}
- Nemoura pygmaea Braasch & Joost, 1972^{c g}
- Nemoura quadrituberata Shimizu, 1997^{c g}
- Nemoura rahlae Jewett, 1958^{c g}
- Nemoura raptoraloba Sivec & Stark, 2010^{c g}
- Nemoura redimiculum Kawai, 1966^{c g}
- Nemoura remota Banks, 1920^{c g}
- Nemoura rickeri Jewett, 1971^{i c g}
- Nemoura rifensis Aubert, 1960^{c g}
- Nemoura rivorum Ravizza, C. & Ravizza Dematteis, 1995^{c g}
- Nemoura rotundprojecta Du, Y. & P. Zhou, 2008^{c g}
- Nemoura rugosa Zwick, P., 2010^{c g}
- Nemoura sabina Fochetti & Vinçon, 2009^{c g}
- Nemoura sachalinensis Matsumura, 1911^{c g}
- Nemoura saetifera Shimizu, 1997^{c g}
- Nemoura sahlbergi Morton, 1896^{c g}
- Nemoura sciurus Aubert, 1949^{c g}
- Nemoura securigera Klapálek, 1908^{c g}
- Nemoura serrarimi Aubert, 1967^{c g}
- Nemoura sichuanensis Li, Weihai & D. Yang, 2006^{c g}
- Nemoura sinuata Ris, 1902^{c g}
- Nemoura speustica Newman, 1851^{c g}
- Nemoura spinacerca Sivec & Stark, 2010^{c g}
- Nemoura spiniloba Jewett, 1954^{i c g}
- Nemoura spinosa Wu, C.F., 1939^{c g}
- Nemoura stellata Li, Weihai & D. Yang, 2008^{c g}
- Nemoura stratum Kawai, 1966^{c g}
- Nemoura stylocerca Sivec & Stark, 2010^{c g}
- Nemoura subtilis Klapálek, 1896^{c g}
- Nemoura taihangshana Wang, H., Weihai Li & D. Yang, 2013^{c g}
- Nemoura tamangi Sivec, 1980^{c g}
- Nemoura tau Zwick, P., 1973^{c g}
- Nemoura taurica Zhiltzova, 1967^{c g}
- Nemoura tenuiloba Sivec & Stark, 2010^{c g}
- Nemoura transsylvanica Kis, 1963^{c g}
- Nemoura transversospinosa Zhiltzova, 1979^{c g}
- Nemoura triangulifera Zwick, P., 1980^{c g}
- Nemoura tridenticula Li, Weihai, G. Wang & D. Yang, 2012^{c g}
- Nemoura tripotini Zwick, P., 2010^{c g}
- Nemoura trivittata Shimizu, 1997^{c g}
- Nemoura turcica Zwick, P., 1972^{c g}
- Nemoura uenoi Kawai, 1954^{c g}
- Nemoura uncinata Despax, 1934^{c g}
- Nemoura undulata Ris, 1902^{c g}
- Nemoura unicornis Jewett, 1975^{c g}
- Nemoura ussuriensis Zhiltzova, 1997^{c g}
- Nemoura viki Lillehammer, 1972^{c g}
- Nemoura vinconi Murányi, 2007^{c g}
- Nemoura wangi Li, Weihai & D. Yang, 2008^{c g}
- Nemoura wittmeri Zwick, P., 1975^{c g}
- Nemoura xistralensis Vinçon & Pardo, 2003^{c g}
- Nemoura yunnanensis Wu, C.F., 1939^{c g}
- Nemoura zaohensis Shimizu, 1997^{c g}
- Nemoura zwicki Sivec, 1980^{c g}

Data sources: i = ITIS, c = Catalogue of Life, g = GBIF, b = Bugguide.net
