= Amphinemura linda =

Scientific classification
- Domain: Eukaryota
- Kingdom: Animalia
- Phylum: Arthropoda
- Class: Insecta
- Order: Plecoptera
- Family: Nemouridae
- Genus: Amphinemura
- Species: A. linda

Binomial name
- Amphinemura linda (Ricker, 1952)

Species of stonefly

Amphinemura linda is a species of spring stonefly in the family Nemouridae. It is found in North America.
