= Paranemoura perfecta =

Scientific classification
- Domain: Eukaryota
- Kingdom: Animalia
- Phylum: Arthropoda
- Class: Insecta
- Order: Plecoptera
- Family: Nemouridae
- Genus: Paranemoura
- Species: P. perfecta

Binomial name
- Paranemoura perfecta (Walker, 1852)

Synonyms
- Nemoura perfecta Walker, 1852

Species of stonefly

Paranemoura perfecta, the spotted forestfly, is a species of spring stonefly in the family Nemouridae. It is found in North America.
