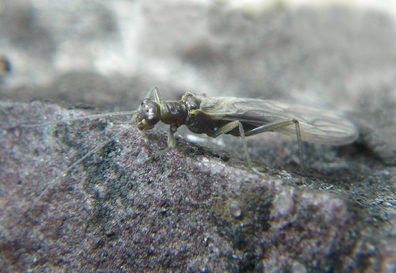

Conservation status
- Threatened (ESA)

Scientific classification
- Domain: Eukaryota
- Kingdom: Animalia
- Phylum: Arthropoda
- Class: Insecta
- Order: Plecoptera
- Family: Nemouridae
- Subfamily: Nemourinae
- Genus: Lednia; Ricker, 1952
- Species: L. tumana

Binomial name
- Lednia tumana (Ricker, 1952)

= Lednia =

Genus of stoneflies

Lednia is a monotypic genus, containing the single species Lednia tumana (the meltwater stonefly)—a rare, alpine, aquatic insect that is endangered due to likely loss of glaciers and snowpacks in Glacier National Park and other habitat in the Rocky Mountains due to climate change. Lednia can be differentiated from other genera in Nemouridae by the abdominal stremite: only Lednia and Paranemoura lack the vesicles of the ninth abdominal stermite.

== Habitat and adaptations ==
The insect lives in the coldest streams just downstream of the glacier or snowbank sources and is considered as an early warning indicator species of climate warming in mountain ecosystems. Lednia tumana is able to use biochemical and physiological strategies to diminish cold stress, which allows them to survive colder climates.

The Fisheries and Wildlife Service is being petitioned to protect the species under the U.S. Endangered Species Act.

== Conservation ==
A study of the melting of glaciers due to climate change found that some species would benefit from the subsequent emergence of new ecosystems. This also includes Lednia tumana.

Lednia species generally emerge as adults in mid-to-late summer, varying among streams due to thermal regime and snow cover. Adult Lednia tumana have a short lifespan, likely lasting a week or less, making them challenging to collect at this stage.

Researches have concluded that efforts should focus on conducting surveys to identify unmapped Lednia populations, targeting management towards climate refugia-linked populations, and regular monitoring of population sizes and environmental conditions.
