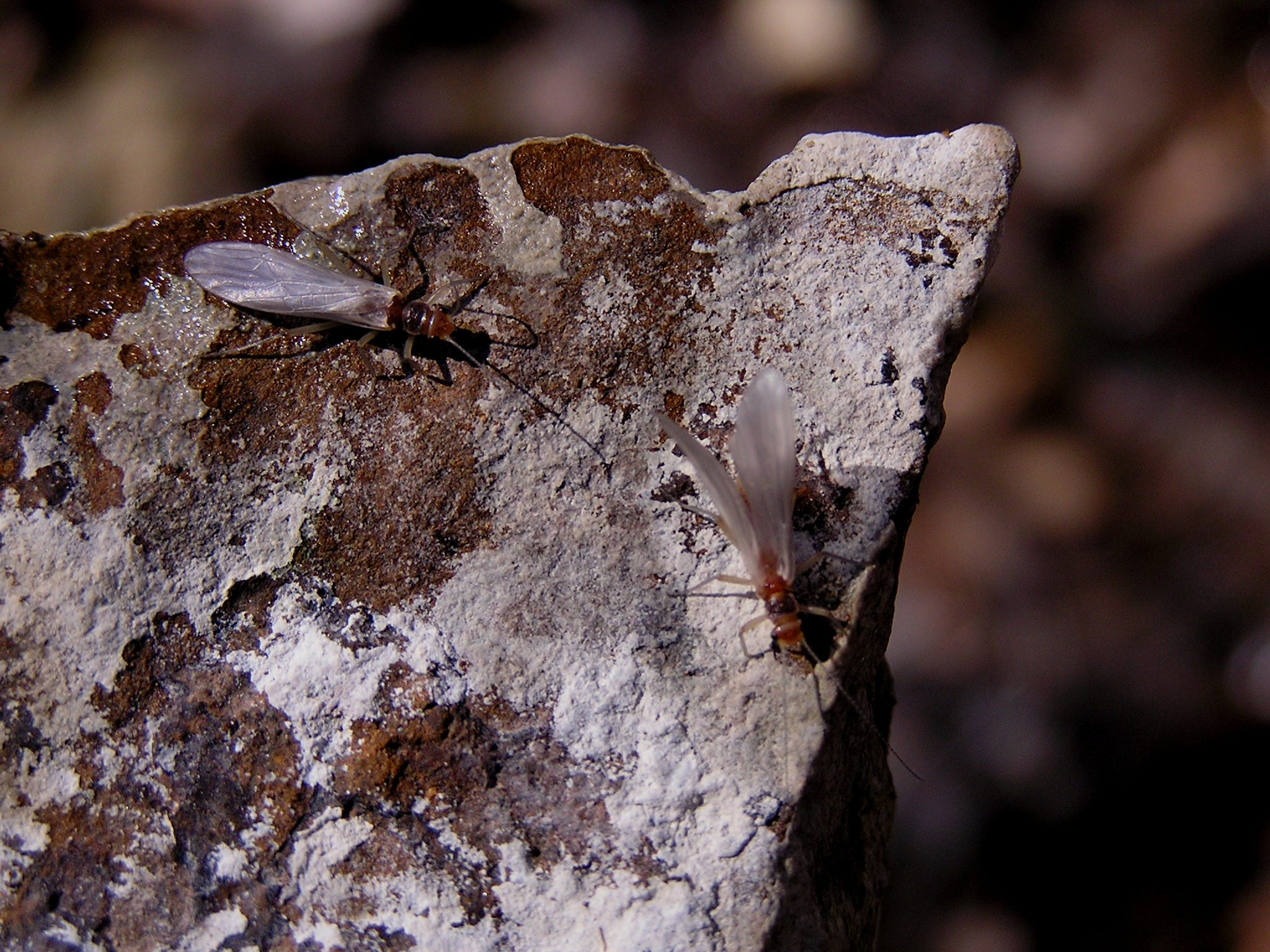
- Soyedina vallicularia

Scientific classification
- Domain: Eukaryota
- Kingdom: Animalia
- Phylum: Arthropoda
- Class: Insecta
- Order: Plecoptera
- Family: Nemouridae
- Subfamily: Nemourinae
- Genus: Soyedina; Ricker, 1952

Species
- See text

= Soyedina =

Genus of stoneflies

Soyedina is a genus of stoneflies belonging to the family Nemouridae. This exclusively Nearctic genus was originally erected as a subgenus of Nemoura but was elevated to genus status by Joachim Illies in 1966. There are currently 11 described species, most only identifiable by small differences in the genitalia.

== Species ==
- Soyedina alexandria
- Soyedina calcarea
- Soyedina carolinensis
- Soyedina interrupta
- Soyedina kondratieffi
- Soyedina merritti
- Soyedina nevadensis
- Soyedina parkeri
- Soyedina potteri
- Soyedina producta
- Soyedina sheldoni
- Soyedina vallicularia
- Soyedina washingtoni
