= Ostrocerca truncata =

Conservation status
- Apparently Secure (NatureServe)

Scientific classification
- Kingdom: Animalia
- Phylum: Arthropoda
- Clade: Pancrustacea
- Class: Insecta
- Order: Plecoptera
- Family: Nemouridae
- Genus: Ostrocerca
- Species: O. truncata

Binomial name
- Ostrocerca truncata (Claassen, 1923)

Synonyms
- Nemoura truncata Claassen, 1923

Species of stonefly

Ostrocerca truncata, the truncate forestfly, is a species of spring stonefly in the family Nemouridae. It is found in eastern North America in both Canada and the United States. It inhabits creeks and springs.
