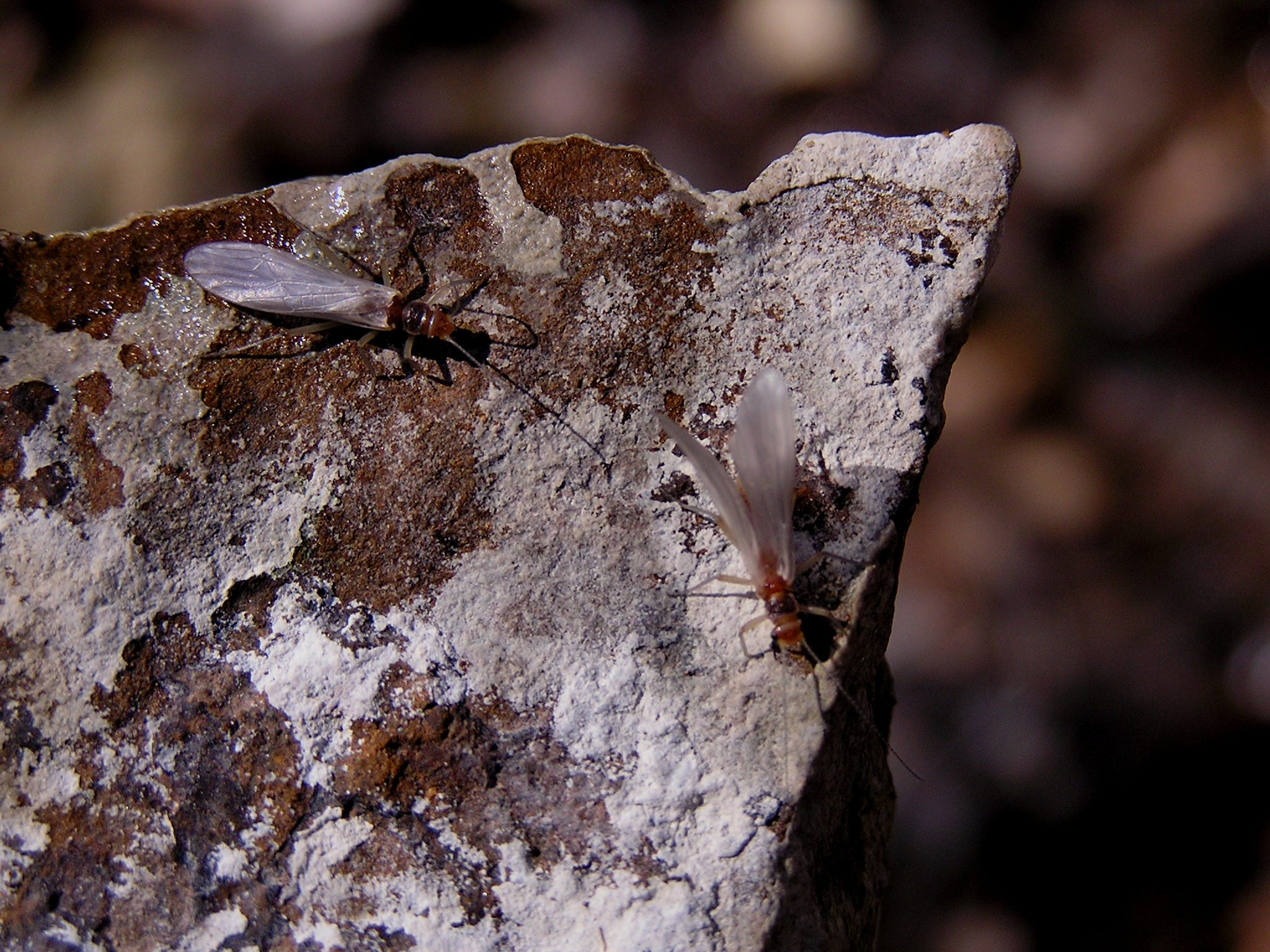

Scientific classification
- Domain: Eukaryota
- Kingdom: Animalia
- Phylum: Arthropoda
- Class: Insecta
- Order: Plecoptera
- Family: Nemouridae
- Genus: Soyedina
- Species: S. vallicularia

Binomial name
- Soyedina vallicularia (Wu, 1923)

= Soyedina vallicularia =

Species of stonefly

Soyedina vallicularia, the valley forestfly, is a species of spring stonefly in the family Nemouridae. It is found in North America.
