= Soyedina washingtoni =

Scientific classification
- Domain: Eukaryota
- Kingdom: Animalia
- Phylum: Arthropoda
- Class: Insecta
- Order: Plecoptera
- Family: Nemouridae
- Genus: Soyedina
- Species: S. washingtoni

Binomial name
- Soyedina washingtoni (Claassen, 1923)

Synonyms
- Nemoura washingtoni Claassen, 1923

Species of stonefly

Soyedina washingtoni, the vernal forestfly, is a species of spring stonefly in the family Nemouridae. It is found in North America.
