= Amphinemura nigritta =

Scientific classification
- Domain: Eukaryota
- Kingdom: Animalia
- Phylum: Arthropoda
- Class: Insecta
- Order: Plecoptera
- Family: Nemouridae
- Genus: Amphinemura
- Species: A. nigritta

Binomial name
- Amphinemura nigritta (Provancher, 1876)

Synonyms
- Nemoura nigritta Provancher, 1876; Nemoura venosa Banks, 1897

Species of stonefly

Amphinemura nigritta, the little black forestfly, is a species of spring stonefly in the family Nemouridae. It is found in North America.
