= Ostrocerca complexa =

Conservation status
- Apparently Secure (NatureServe)

Scientific classification
- Kingdom: Animalia
- Phylum: Arthropoda
- Clade: Pancrustacea
- Class: Insecta
- Order: Plecoptera
- Family: Nemouridae
- Genus: Ostrocerca
- Species: O. complexa

Binomial name
- Ostrocerca complexa (Claassen, 1937)

Synonyms
- Nemoura complexa Claassen, 1937

Species of stonefly

Ostrocerca complexa, the notched forestfly, is a species of spring stonefly in the family Nemouridae. It is found in eastern North America in both Canada and the United States. It inhabits creeks and seeps.
