= Amphinemura wui =

Scientific classification
- Domain: Eukaryota
- Kingdom: Animalia
- Phylum: Arthropoda
- Class: Insecta
- Order: Plecoptera
- Family: Nemouridae
- Genus: Amphinemura
- Species: A. wui

Binomial name
- Amphinemura wui (Claassen, 1936)

Synonyms
- Nemoura wui Claassen, 1936

Species of stonefly

Amphinemura wui, the spiked forestfly, is a species of spring stonefly in the family Nemouridae. It is found in North America.
