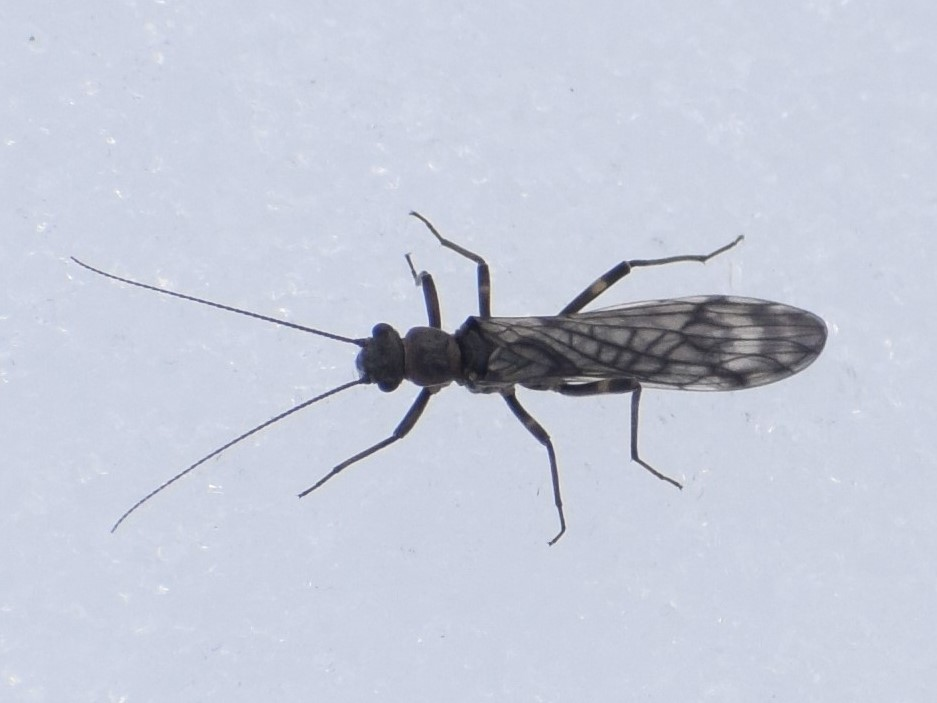

Scientific classification
- Domain: Eukaryota
- Kingdom: Animalia
- Phylum: Arthropoda
- Class: Insecta
- Order: Plecoptera
- Family: Nemouridae
- Genus: Zapada
- Species: Z. cinctipes

Binomial name
- Zapada cinctipes (Banks, 1897)

Synonyms
- Nemoura cinctipes Banks, 1897

= Zapada cinctipes =

Species of stonefly

Zapada cinctipes, the common forestfly, is a species of spring stonefly in the family Nemouridae. It is found in North America.
