= Prostoia similis =

Scientific classification
- Domain: Eukaryota
- Kingdom: Animalia
- Phylum: Arthropoda
- Class: Insecta
- Order: Plecoptera
- Family: Nemouridae
- Genus: Prostoia
- Species: P. similis

Binomial name
- Prostoia similis (Hagen, 1861)

Species of stonefly

Prostoia similis, the longhorn forestfly, is a species of spring stonefly in the family Nemouridae. It is found in North America.
