= Ostrocerca dimicki =

Conservation status
- Apparently Secure (NatureServe)

Scientific classification
- Kingdom: Animalia
- Phylum: Arthropoda
- Clade: Pancrustacea
- Class: Insecta
- Order: Plecoptera
- Family: Nemouridae
- Genus: Ostrocerca
- Species: O. dimicki

Binomial name
- Ostrocerca dimicki (Frison, 1936)

Synonyms
- Nemoura dimicki Frison, 1936

Species of stonefly

Ostrocerca dimicki, the hooked forestfly, is a species of spring stonefly in the family Nemouridae. It is found in western North America from southern British Columbia (Canada) to Oregon (United States). It inhabits small streams and springs.
