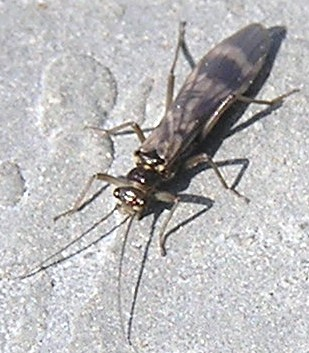

Scientific classification
- Domain: Eukaryota
- Kingdom: Animalia
- Phylum: Arthropoda
- Class: Insecta
- Order: Plecoptera
- Family: Nemouridae
- Genus: Prostoia
- Species: P. completa

Binomial name
- Prostoia completa (Walker, 1852)

Synonyms
- Nemoura completa Walker, 1852

= Prostoia completa =

Species of stonefly

Prostoia completa, the central forestfly, is a species of spring stonefly in the family Nemouridae. It is found in North America.
