= Zapada columbiana =

Scientific classification
- Domain: Eukaryota
- Kingdom: Animalia
- Phylum: Arthropoda
- Class: Insecta
- Order: Plecoptera
- Family: Nemouridae
- Genus: Zapada
- Species: Z. columbiana

Binomial name
- Zapada columbiana (Claassen, 1923)

Species of stonefly

Zapada columbiana is a species in the family Nemouridae ("spring stoneflies"), in the order Plecoptera ("stoneflies"). The species is known generally as the "Columbian forestfly". It is found in North America.
