= Zapada oregonensis =

Scientific classification
- Kingdom: Animalia
- Phylum: Arthropoda
- Class: Insecta
- Order: Plecoptera
- Family: Nemouridae
- Genus: Zapada
- Species: Z. oregonensis

Binomial name
- Zapada oregonensis (Claassen, 1923)

Synonyms
- Nemoura oregonensis Claassen, 1923

Species of stonefly

Zapada oregonensis, the Oregon forestfly, is a species of spring stonefly in the family Nemouridae. It is found in North America.
