= Podmosta macdunnoughi =

Scientific classification
- Domain: Eukaryota
- Kingdom: Animalia
- Phylum: Arthropoda
- Class: Insecta
- Order: Plecoptera
- Family: Nemouridae
- Genus: Podmosta
- Species: P. macdunnoughi

Binomial name
- Podmosta macdunnoughi (Ricker, 1947)

Species of insect

Podmosta macdunnoughi, the maritime forestfly, is a species of spring stonefly in the family Nemouridae. It is found in North America.
