= Nemoura arctica =

Scientific classification
- Domain: Eukaryota
- Kingdom: Animalia
- Phylum: Arthropoda
- Class: Insecta
- Order: Plecoptera
- Family: Nemouridae
- Genus: Nemoura
- Species: N. arctica

Binomial name
- Nemoura arctica Esben-Petersen, 1910

Species of stonefly

Nemoura arctica is a species of spring stonefly in the family Nemouridae.

== Locations ==
It is found in North America, temperate Asia, and Europe.

== Taxonomic synonyms ==
Nemoura trispinosa, the "three-spined forestfly", has been identified as a taxonomic synonym of this species.
