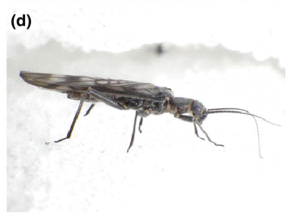
- An adult Zapada glacier

Scientific classification
- Domain: Eukaryota
- Kingdom: Animalia
- Phylum: Arthropoda
- Class: Insecta
- Order: Plecoptera
- Family: Nemouridae
- Subfamily: Nemourinae
- Genus: Zapada; Ricker, 1952

= Zapada =

Genus of stoneflies

Zapada is a genus of spring stoneflies in the family Nemouridae. There are at least 10 described species in Zapada.

== Species ==
- Zapada chila (Ricker, 1952)
- Zapada cinctipes (Banks, 1897) (common forestfly)
- Zapada columbiana (Claassen, 1923) (Columbian forestfly)
- Zapada cordillera (Baumann and Gaufin, 1971)
- Zapada frigida (Claassen, 1923)
- Zapada glacier (Baumann and Gaufin, 1971)
- Zapada haysi (Ricker, 1952)
- Zapada katahdin Baumann and Mingo, 1987
- Zapada oregonensis (Claassen, 1923) (Oregon forestfly)
- Zapada wahkeena (Jewett, 1954)
