= Ostrocerca =

Scientific classification
- Kingdom: Animalia
- Phylum: Arthropoda
- Clade: Pancrustacea
- Class: Insecta
- Order: Plecoptera
- Family: Nemouridae
- Subfamily: Nemourinae
- Genus: Ostrocerca; Ricker, 1952

Genus of stoneflies

Ostrocerca is a genus of spring stoneflies in the family Nemouridae. They occur in North America.

== Species ==
These six species belong to the genus Ostrocerca:

- Ostrocerca albidipennis (Walker, 1852) (white-tailed forestfly)
- Ostrocerca complexa (Claassen, 1937) (notched forestfly)
- Ostrocerca dimicki (Frison, 1936) (hooked forestfly)
- Ostrocerca foersteri (Ricker, 1943) (Cascades forestfly)
- Ostrocerca prolongata (Claassen, 1923) (bent forestfly)
- Ostrocerca truncata (Claassen, 1923) (truncate forestfly)
