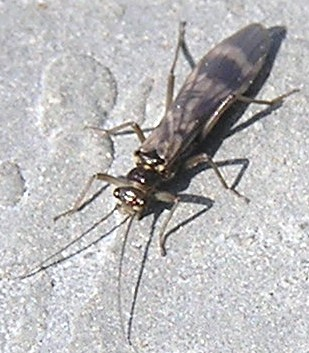
- Prostoia completa

Scientific classification
- Domain: Eukaryota
- Kingdom: Animalia
- Phylum: Arthropoda
- Class: Insecta
- Order: Plecoptera
- Family: Nemouridae
- Subfamily: Nemourinae
- Genus: Prostoia; Ricker, 1952

= Prostoia =

Genus of stoneflies

Prostoia is a genus of spring stoneflies in the family Nemouridae. There are about five described species in Prostoia.

== Species ==
These five species belong to the genus Prostoia:

- Prostoia besametsa (Ricker, 1952)
- Prostoia completa (Walker, 1852) (central forestfly)
- Prostoia hallasi Kondratieff & Kirchner, 1984
- Prostoia ozarkensis Baumann & Grubbs, 2014
- Prostoia similis (Hagen, 1861) (longhorn forestfly)
