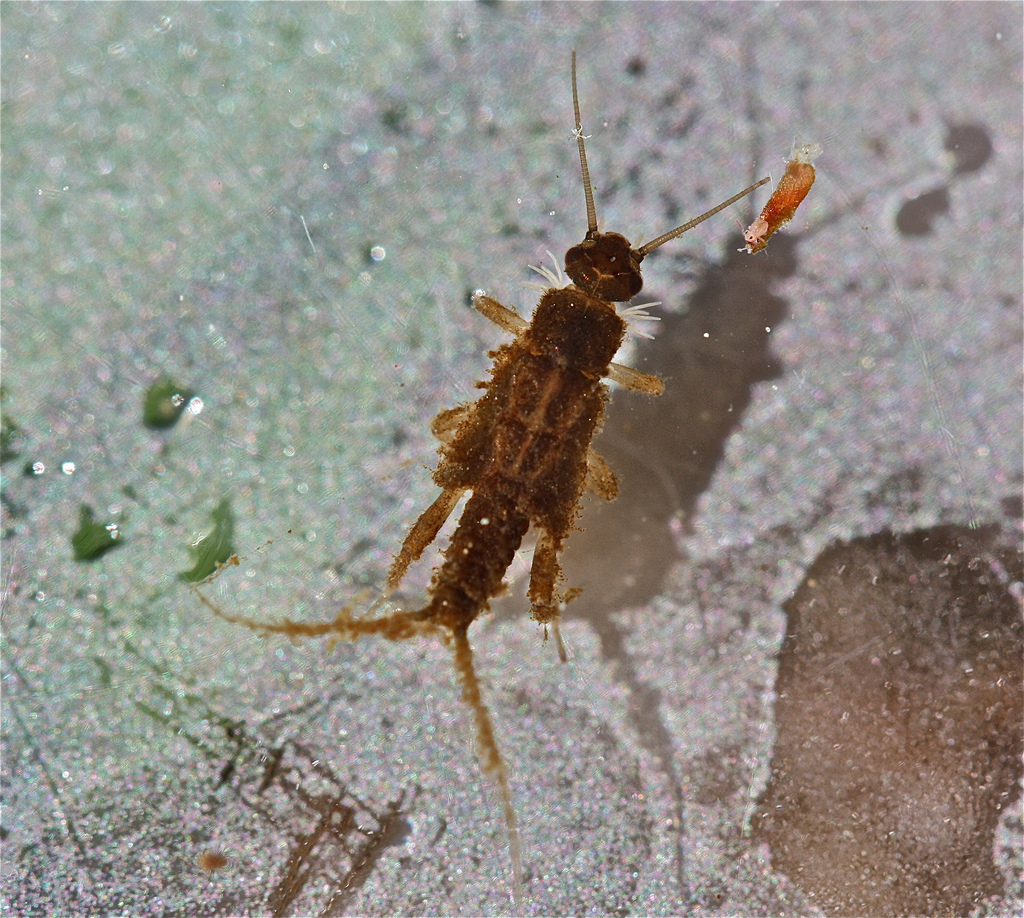

Scientific classification
- Domain: Eukaryota
- Kingdom: Animalia
- Phylum: Arthropoda
- Class: Insecta
- Order: Plecoptera
- Family: Nemouridae
- Subfamily: Amphinemurinae
- Genus: Amphinemura; Ris, 1902

= Amphinemura =

Genus of stoneflies

Amphinemura is a genus of spring stoneflies in the family Nemouridae. There are about 18 described species in Amphinemura.

== Species ==
- Amphinemura alabama Baumann, 1996
- Amphinemura apache Baumann and Gaufin, 1972
- Amphinemura appalachia Baumann, 1996
- Amphinemura banksi Baumann and Gaufin, 1972
- Amphinemura delosa (Ricker, 1952)
- Amphinemura linda (Ricker, 1952)
- Amphinemura mexicana Baumann, 1972
- Amphinemura mockfordi (Ricker, 1952)
- Amphinemura mogollonica Baumann and Gaufin, 1972
- Amphinemura nigritta (Provancher, 1876) (little black forestfly)
- Amphinemura puebla Baumann, 1972
- Amphinemura reinerti Baumann, 1976
- Amphinemura sulcicollis (Stephens, 1836)
- Amphinemura texana Baumann, 1996
- Amphinemura varshava (Ricker, 1952)
- Amphinemura venusta (Banks, 1911)
- Amphinemura verrucosa Zwick, 1973
- Amphinemura wui (Claassen, 1936) (spiked forestfly)
