= Podmosta =

Scientific classification
- Domain: Eukaryota
- Kingdom: Animalia
- Phylum: Arthropoda
- Class: Insecta
- Order: Plecoptera
- Family: Nemouridae
- Subfamily: Nemourinae
- Genus: Podmosta; Ricker, 1952

Genus of stoneflies

Podmosta is a genus of spring stoneflies in the family Nemouridae. There are about six described species in Podmosta.

== Species ==
These six species belong to the genus Podmosta:

- Podmosta decepta (Frison, 1942)
- Podmosta delicatula (Claassen, 1923)
- Podmosta macdunnoughi (Ricker, 1947) (maritime forestfly)
- Podmosta obscura (Frison, 1936)
- Podmosta weberi (Ricker, 1952)
- † Podmosta attenuata Caruso & Wichard, 2010
