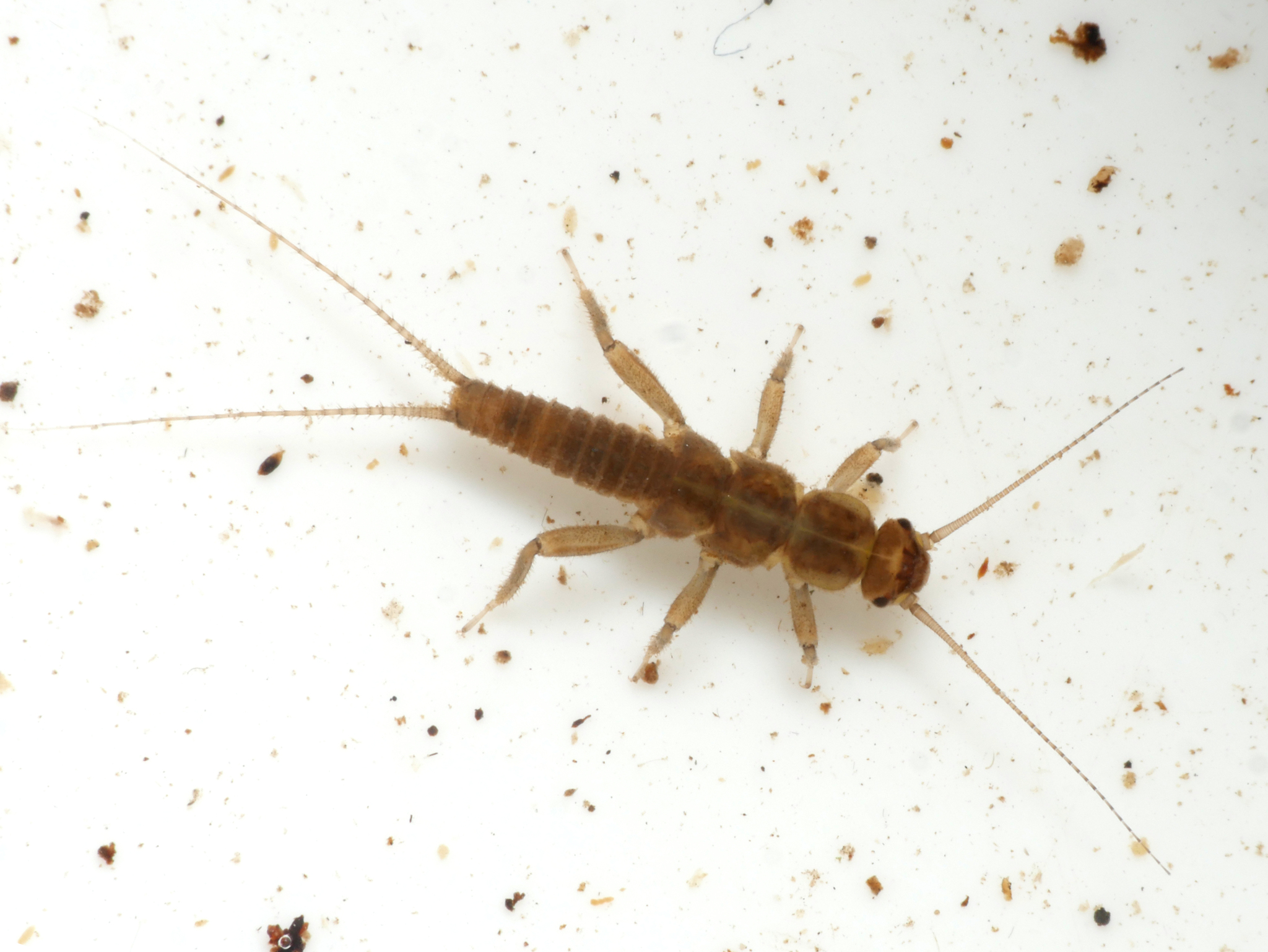

Scientific classification
- Domain: Eukaryota
- Kingdom: Animalia
- Phylum: Arthropoda
- Class: Insecta
- Order: Plecoptera
- Family: Nemouridae
- Genus: Nemurella; Kempny, 1898
- Species: N. pictetii

Binomial name
- Nemurella pictetii (Klapálek, 1900)

Synonyms
- Nemoura duclosi (Navás, 1932); Nemoura (Nemurella) inconspicua (Kempny, 1898); Nemoura nitida (Stephens, 1836); Nemoura rodriguezi (Navás, 1918); Nemurella samali Balthazar, 1936

= Nemurella =

Nemurella pictetii

Genus of insects

Nemurella is a genus of stoneflies in the family Nemouridae. It is monotypic, being represented by the single species Nemurella pictetii. It is found in Europe.
