= Paranemoura =

Scientific classification
- Domain: Eukaryota
- Kingdom: Animalia
- Phylum: Arthropoda
- Class: Insecta
- Order: Plecoptera
- Family: Nemouridae
- Subfamily: Nemourinae
- Genus: Paranemoura; Needham & Claassen, 1925

Genus of stoneflies

Paranemoura is a genus of spring stoneflies in the family Nemouridae. There are at least two described species in Paranemoura.

== Species ==
These two species belong to the genus Paranemoura:

- Paranemoura claasseni Baumann, 1996
- Paranemoura perfecta (Walker, 1852) (spotted forestfly)
