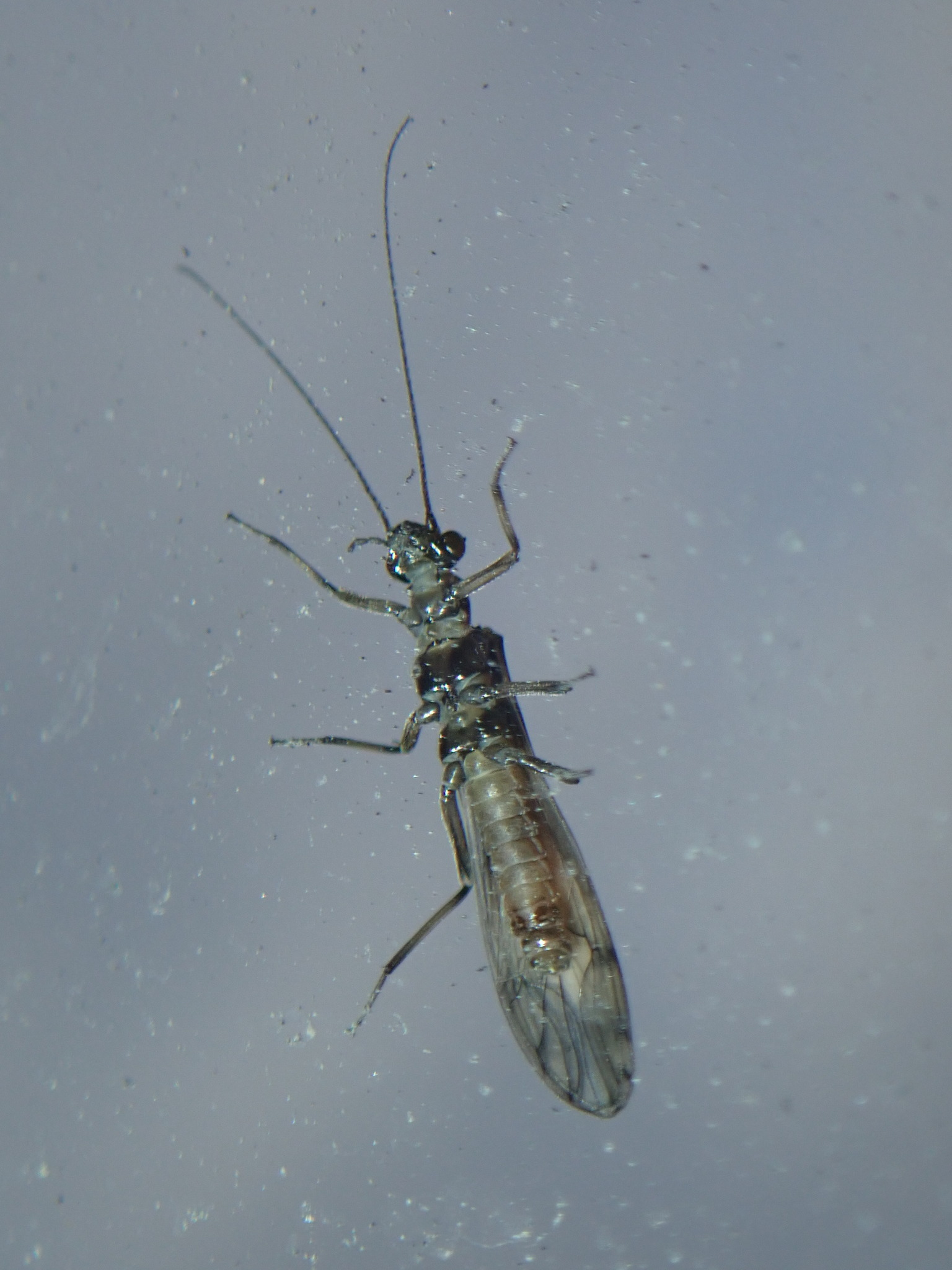

Scientific classification
- Domain: Eukaryota
- Kingdom: Animalia
- Phylum: Arthropoda
- Class: Insecta
- Order: Plecoptera
- Family: Nemouridae
- Genus: Shipsa; Ricker, 1952
- Species: S. rotunda

Binomial name
- Shipsa rotunda (Claassen, 1923)

= Shipsa =

Shipsa rotunda

Genus of stoneflies

Shipsa is a genus of spring stoneflies in the family Nemouridae. It is monotypic, being represented by the single species, Shipsa rotunda.
