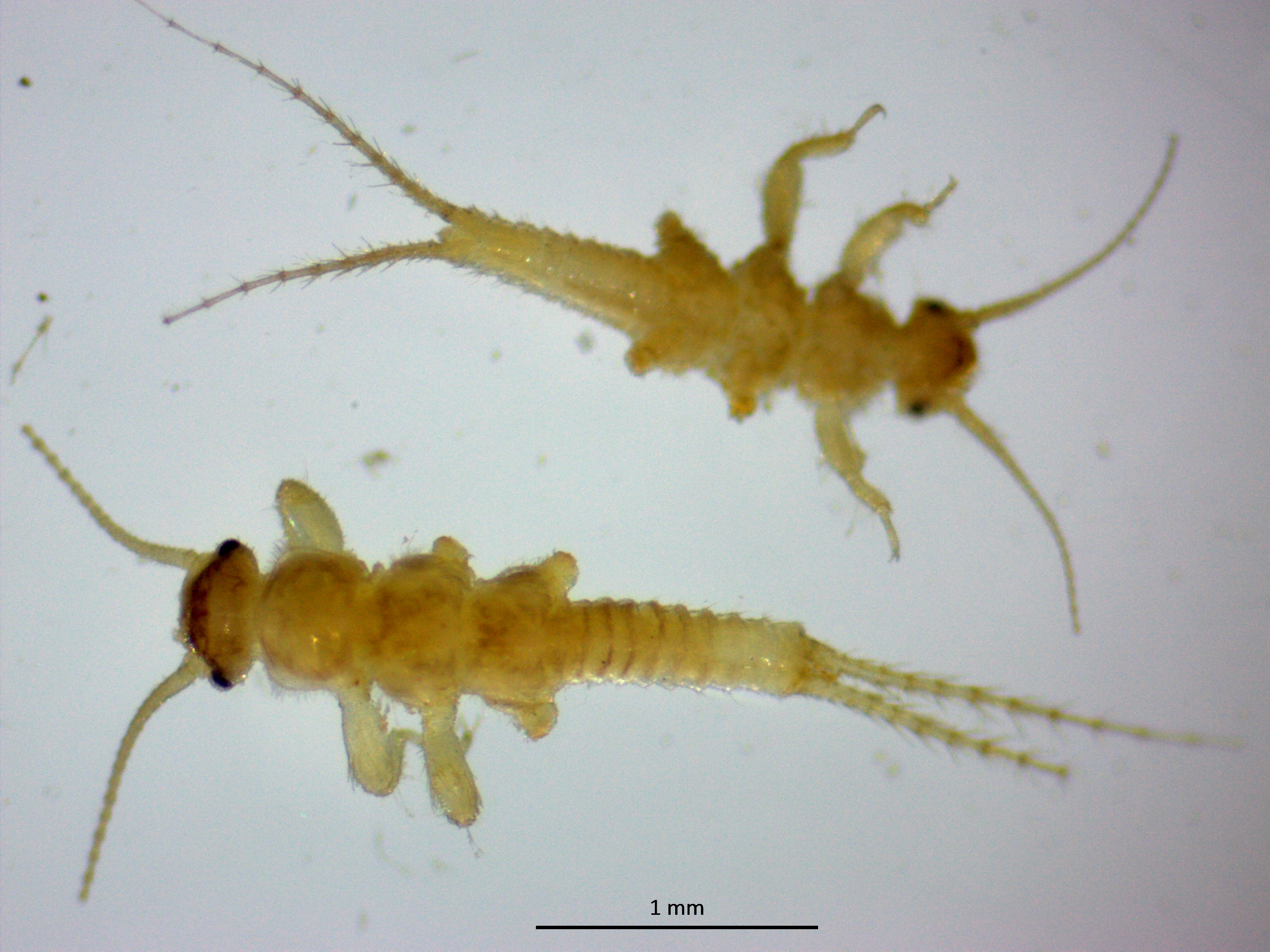

Scientific classification
- Kingdom: Animalia
- Phylum: Arthropoda
- Class: Insecta
- Order: Plecoptera
- Family: Nemouridae
- Subfamily: Nemourinae
- Genus: Nemoura; Latreille, 1796

Diversity
- at least 190 species

= Nemoura =

Genus of stoneflies

Nemoura is a genus of spring stoneflies in the family Nemouridae. There are more than 190 described species in Nemoura.

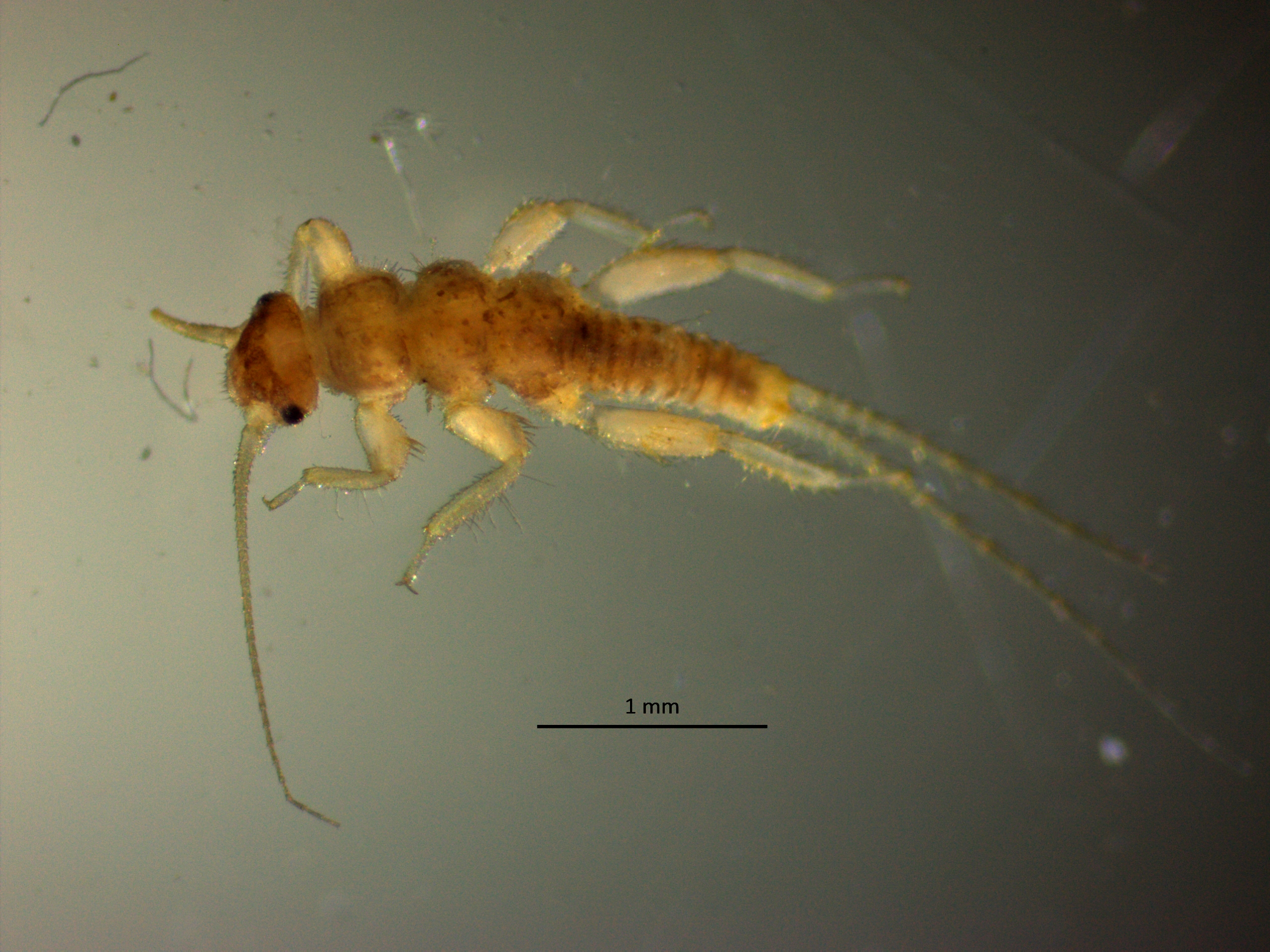

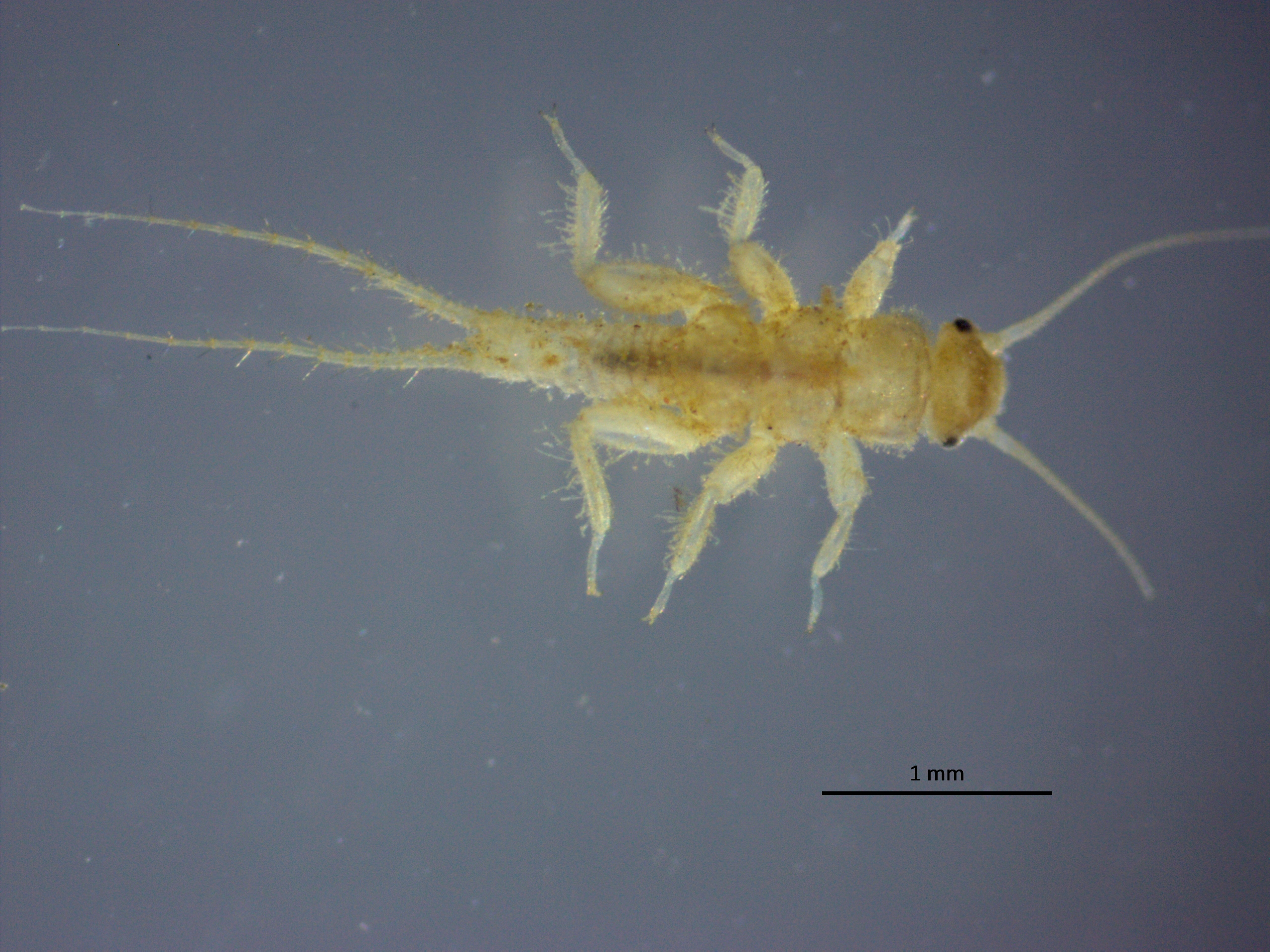

== See also ==
- List of Nemoura species
