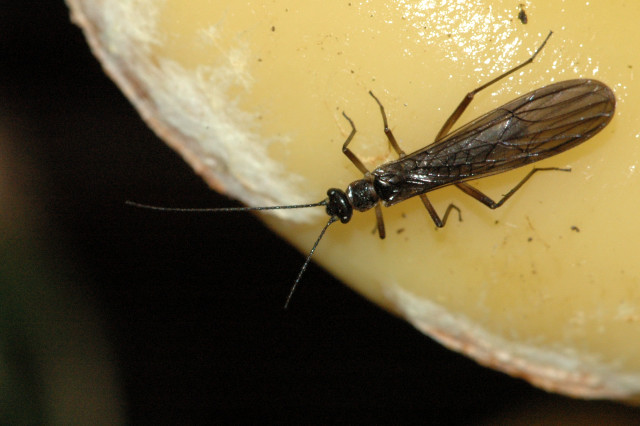
- Nemoura cinerea

Scientific classification
- Domain: Eukaryota
- Kingdom: Animalia
- Phylum: Arthropoda
- Class: Insecta
- Cohort: Polyneoptera
- Order: Plecoptera
- Superfamily: Nemouroidea
- Family: Nemouridae

= Nemouridae =

Family of stoneflies

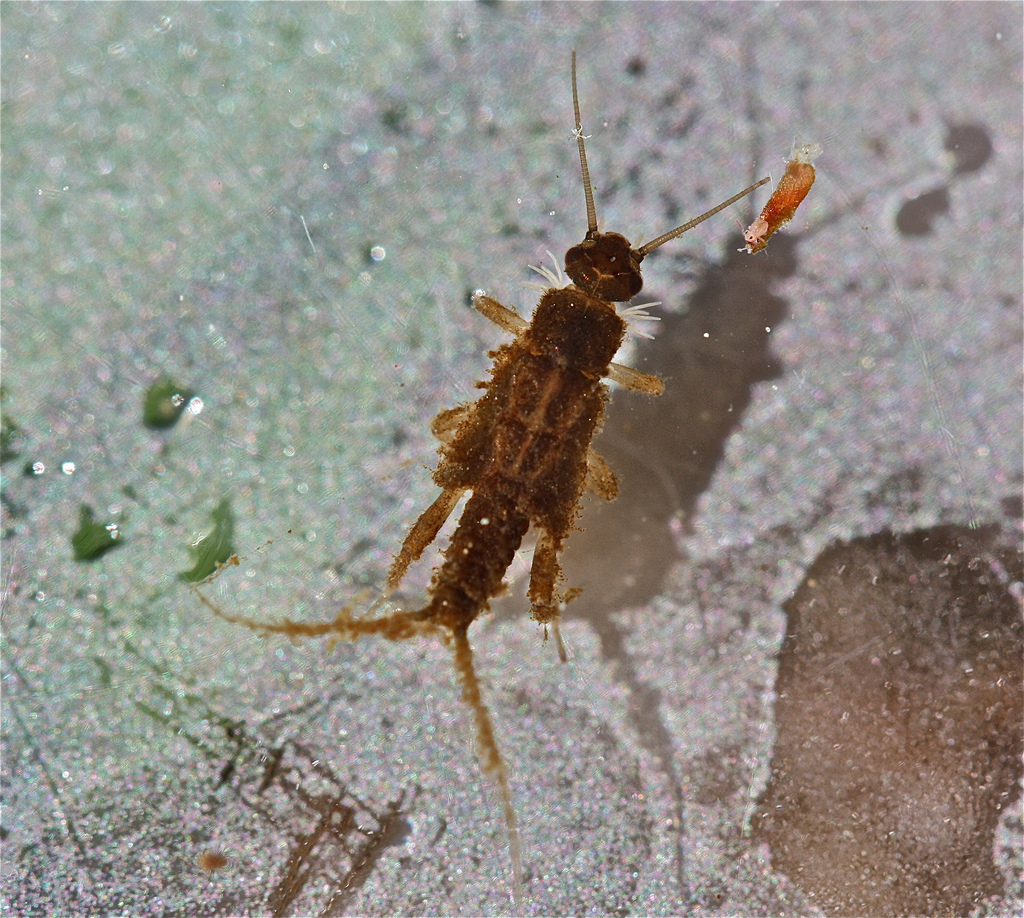
Amphinemura nymph.

The Nemouridae are a family of stoneflies containing more than 700 described species, occurring primarily in the Holarctic region. Members of this family are commonly known as spring stoneflies or brown stoneflies. Fly fishermen often refer to these insects as tiny winter blacks.

Although these insects use a wide range of flowing-water habitats, they tend to be most prevalent in smaller streams. The nymphs are distinctive, being broad-bodied and bristly with divergent wing pads.

== Subfamilies and genera ==
The Plecoptera species file lists:

=== Amphinemurinae ===
Authority: Baumann, 1975

1. Amphinemura Ris, 1902
2. Indonemoura Baumann, 1975
3. Malenka (insect) Ricker, 1952
4. Mesonemoura Baumann, 1975
5. Protonemura Kempny, 1898
6. Sphaeronemoura Shimizu & Sivec, 2001
7. Tominemoura Sivec & Stark, 2009

=== Nemourinae ===
Authority: Billberg, 1820

- genus group Nemoura
1. Illiesonemoura Baumann, 1975
2. Nemoura Latreille, 1796
3. Sinonemura Mo, Li & Murányi, 2020
4. Zapada Ricker, 1952
- other genera:
1. †Balticonemoura Chen, 2021
2. Lednia Ricker, 1952
3. Nanonemoura Baumann & Fiala, 2001
4. Nemurella Kempny, 1898
5. Ostrocerca Ricker, 1952
6. Paranemoura Needham & Claassen, 1925
7. Podmosta Ricker, 1952
8. Prostoia Ricker, 1952
9. Shipsa Ricker, 1952
10. Soyedina Ricker, 1952
11. Visoka Ricker, 1952
