= 2024 in paleoentomology =

This list of 2024 in paleoentomology records new fossil insect taxa that are to be described during the year, as well as documents significant paleoentomology discoveries and events which occurred during that year.

== Clade Amphiesmenoptera ==
=== Lepidopterans ===
Name	Novelty	Status	Authors	Age	Type locality	Location	Notes	Images
Anawrahta	Gen. et sp. nov	Valid	Mey	Cretaceous	Burmese amber	Myanmar	A member of the family Acanthopteroctetidae. The type species is A. nudialaria.	
Caloptilites	Gen. et sp. nov	Valid	Fischer	Eocene	Baltic amber	Europe (Gdańsk Bay region)	A member of the family Gracillariidae. The type species is C. eos.	
Eoeriocottis	Gen. et sp. nov	Valid	Nel, Ngô-Muller & Nel	Eocene	Baltic amber	Europe (Baltic Sea region)	A member of the family Eriocottidae belonging to the subfamily Eriocottinae. The type species is E. magnificus.	
Praeelachista	Gen. et sp. nov	Valid	Fischer	Eocene	Baltic amber	Europe (Gdańsk Bay region)	A member of the family Elachistidae. The type species is P. eozaenella.	
Preheterobathmia	Gen. et sp. nov	Valid	Mey	Late Cretaceous (Cenomanian)	Burmese amber	Myanmar	A probable heterobathmiid non-glossatan moth. The type species is P. grimaldii.	Preheterobathmia grimaldii
Terncladus	Gen. et 2 sp. nov		Han, Zhang & Ren in Han et al.	Late Cretaceous (Cenomanian)	Burmese amber	Myanmar	A member of the family Micropterigidae. The type species is T. lunatus genus also includes T. halonatus.	

=== Trichopterans ===
Name	Novelty	Status	Authors	Age	Type locality	Location	Notes	Images
Copulariella	Gen. et sp. nov		Wang, Engel, Zhang, Shih & Ren in Wang et al.	Late Cretaceous (Cenomanian)	Burmese amber	Myanmar	A member of the family Hydroptilidae belonging to the subfamily Burminoptilinae. The type species is C. ramus.	
Electroadicella unipetra	Sp. nov	Valid	Melnitsky et al.	Eocene	Rovno amber	Ukraine	A member of the family Leptoceridae.	
Holocentropus totuttotam	Sp. nov	Valid	Melnitsky et al.	Eocene	Rovno amber	Ukraine	A species of Holocentropus.	
Holocentropus vottakvot	Sp. nov	Valid	Melnitsky, Ivanov & Perkovsky in Melnitsky et al.	Eocene	Rovno amber	Ukraine	A species of Holocentropus.	
Khasurtia apertalocularis	Sp. nov		Chao et al.	Early Cretaceous	Yixian Formation	China		
Neucentropus wichardi	Sp. nov	Valid	Shi et al.	Cretaceous	Burmese amber	Myanmar	A member of the family Polycentropodidae.	
Nyctiophylax totaktoetak	Sp. nov	Valid	Melnitsky et al.	Eocene	Rovno amber	Ukraine	A member of the family Polycentropodidae.	
Palaeohelicopsyche marki	Sp. nov	Valid	Wichard & Pankowski	Eocene	Baltic amber	Russia (Kaliningrad Oblast)	A snail-case caddisfly.	
Palaeohelicopsyche netnetdaida	Sp. nov	Valid	Melnitsky, Ivanov & Perkovsky in Melnitsky et al.	Eocene	Rovno amber	Ukraine	A snail-case caddisfly.	
Palerasnitsynus aggregatus	Sp. nov		Wang, Engel, Zhang, Shih & Ren in Wang et al.	Late Cretaceous (Cenomanian)	Burmese amber	Myanmar	A member of the family Psychomyiidae.	
Palerasnitsynus qixi	Sp. nov		Wang, Engel, Zhang, Shih & Ren in Wang et al.	Late Cretaceous (Cenomanian)	Burmese amber	Myanmar	A member of the family Psychomyiidae.	
Palerasnitsynus queqiaoi	Sp. nov		Wang, Engel, Zhang, Shih & Ren in Wang et al.	Late Cretaceous (Cenomanian)	Burmese amber	Myanmar	A member of the family Psychomyiidae.	
Palerasnitsynus xiuqiu	Sp. nov		Wang, Engel, Zhang, Shih & Ren in Wang et al.	Late Cretaceous (Cenomanian)	Burmese amber	Myanmar	A member of the family Psychomyiidae.	
Phryganea vkoivekiraz	Sp. nov	Valid	Melnitsky, Ivanov & Perkovsky in Melnitsky et al.	Eocene	Rovno amber	Ukraine	A species of Phryganea.	
Plectrocnemia pluripotentia	Sp. nov	Valid	Melnitsky, Ivanov & Perkovsky in Melnitsky et al.	Eocene	Rovno amber	Ukraine	A species of Plectrocnemia.	
Plectrocnemia votonokak	Sp. nov	Valid	Melnitsky & Ivanov	Eocene	Baltic amber	Europe (Baltic Sea region)	A species of Plectrocnemia.	

==== Trichopteran research ====
- Frese, McCurry & Wells (2024) describe pupae and uncased larvae of caddisflies from the Miocene McGraths Flat Lagerstätte (Australia), including specimens with large compound eyes preserving details of the rhabdoms and corneal nanocoating and with other external and internal structures, and interpret the environment of the studied caddisflies as affected by cyclic catastrophic events.

== Clade Antliophora ==
=== Dipterans ===
==== Brachycerans ====
Name	Novelty	Status	Authors	Age	Type locality	Location	Notes	Images
Burmophilopota	Gen. et sp. nov	Valid	Feng et al.	Cretaceous	Burmese amber	Myanmar	A member of the family Acroceridae probably belonging to the stem group of Philopotinae. The type species is B. wintertoni.	
Cenorhaphiocerina	Gen. et 2 sp. nov	Valid	Fachin et al.	Miocene; Burdigalian		Dominican Republic; Mexico	A member of the family Stratiomyidae belonging to the subfamily Stratiomyinae and the tribe Prosopochrysini. Genus includes C. dominicana from the Dominican amber and C. kraemerae from the Mexican amber.	
Chyliza colenutti	Sp. nov	Valid	Ross et al.	Eocene (Priabonian)	Bouldnor Formation	United Kingdom	A species of Chyliza.	
Creapsilocephala	Gen. et sp. nov	Valid	Feng et al.	Late Cretaceous; Cenomanian	Burmese amber	Myanmar	A member of the family Apsilocephalidae. The type species is C. nagatomii.	
Hilarempis otagoensis	Sp. nov	Valid	Kaulfuss & Sinclair	Miocene; Aquitanian	Foulden Maar Lagerstätte	New Zealand	A species of Hilarempis.	
Medeterites atterraneus	Comb. nov		(Nazarov)	Eocene	Baltic amber	Europe (Baltic Sea region)	A species of Medeterites. Moved from Anepsiomyia atterraneus Nazarov (1994).	
Medeterites gestuosus	Comb. nov		(Meunier)	Eocene	Baltic amber	Europe (Baltic Sea region)	A species of Medeterites. Moved from Thrypticus gestuosus Meunier (1907).	
Medeterites gulosus	Comb. nov		(Meunier)	Eocene	Baltic amber	Europe (Baltic Sea region)	A species of Medeterites. Moved from Thrypticus gulosus Meunier (1907).	
Medeterites latipennis	Comb. nov		(Meunier)	Eocene	Baltic amber	Europe (Baltic Sea region)	A species of Medeterites. Moved from Achalcus latipennis Meunier (1907).	
Meghyperites	Gen. et sp. nov	Valid	Sinclair & Stark in Sinclair et al.	Eocene	Baltic amber	Europe (Baltic Sea region)	A member of the family Atelestidae. The type species is M. balticus.	
Mioatomosites	Gen. et sp. nov		Camargo & Gomes	Miocene	Mexican amber	Mexico	A Laphriinae robber fly. The type species is M. mexicanus.	
Palaeoargyra planipedia	Comb. nov		(Meunier)	Eocene	Baltic amber	Europe (Baltic Sea region)	A species of Palaeoargyra. Moved from Anepsius planipedius Meunier (1907).	
Palaeomedeterus concinnus	Comb. nov		(Meunier)	Eocene	Baltic amber	Europe (Baltic Sea region)	A species of Palaeomedeterus. Moved from Chrysotus concinnus Meunier (1907).	
Palaeomedeterus praeconcinnus	Comb. nov		(Evenhuis)	Eocene	Baltic amber	Europe (Baltic Sea region)	A species of Palaeomedeterus. Moved from Chrysotus praeconcinnus Evenhuis (1994).	
Palaeomedeterus tertiarius	Comb. nov		(Meunier)	Eocene	Baltic amber	Europe (Baltic Sea region)	A species of Palaeomedeterus. Moved from Diaphorus tertiarius Meunier (1907).	
Paleomydas	Gen. et sp. nov	Valid	Nel & Wedmann	Paleocene	Menat Basin	France	A Mydas fly. The type species is P. menatensis.	
Plesiomedetera	Gen. et comb. nov		Grichanov	Eocene	Baltic amber	Europe (Baltic Sea region)	A member of the family Dolichopodidae. Genus includes P. flammea (Meunier, 1907), P. mustela (Meunier, 1907), P. decora (Meunier, 1907), P. elegantula (Meunier, 1907), P. vana (Meunier, 1907), P. lasciva (Meunier, 1907) and P. lepida (Meunier, 1907). Published online in 2024, but the issue date is listed as December 2023.	
Prohercostomus ciliatus	Comb. nov		(Meunier)	Eocene	Baltic amber	Europe (Baltic Sea region)	A species of Prohercostomus. Moved from Systenus ciliatus Meunier (1907).	
Prohercostomus devinctus	Comb. nov		(Meunier)	Eocene	Baltic amber	Europe (Baltic Sea region)	A species of Prohercostomus. Moved from Gymnopternus devinctus Meunier (1907).	
Prohercostomus gracilis	Comb. nov		(Meunier)	Eocene	Baltic amber	Europe (Baltic Sea region)	A species of Prohercostomus. Moved from Campsicnemus gracilis Meunier (1907).	
Prohercostomus inumbratus	Comb. nov		(Meunier)	Eocene	Baltic amber	Europe (Baltic Sea region)	A species of Prohercostomus. Moved from Gymnopternus inumbratus Meunier (1907).	
Prohercostomus minutus	Comb. nov		(Meunier)	Eocene	Baltic amber	Europe (Baltic Sea region)	A species of Prohercostomus. Moved from Hygroceleuthus minutus Meunier (1907).	
Prohercostomus morbosus	Comb. nov		(Meunier)	Eocene	Baltic amber	Europe (Baltic Sea region)	A species of Prohercostomus. Moved from Dolichopus morbosus Meunier (1907).	
Promeghyperus	Gen. et 2 sp. nov		Zhang, Shih, Ren & Wang in Zhang et al.	Cretaceous	Burmese amber	Myanmar	A member of the family Atelestidae. Genus includes new species P. muricicaudatus and P. hirtus.	
Rhamphomyia brunnipennis	Sp. nov	Valid	Greenwalt & Sinclair	Eocene	Kishenehn Formation	United States	A species of Rhamphomyia.	
Rhamphomyia decens	Sp. nov	Valid	Greenwalt & Sinclair	Eocene	Kishenehn Formation	United States	A species of Rhamphomyia.	
Rhamphomyia kitadai	Sp. nov	Valid	Greenwalt & Sinclair	Eocene	Kishenehn Formation	United States	A species of Rhamphomyia.	
Rhamphomyia pennipes	Sp. nov	Valid	Greenwalt & Sinclair	Eocene	Kishenehn Formation	United States	A species of Rhamphomyia.	
Wheelerenomyia negrobovi	Sp. nov	Valid	Grichanov	Eocene	Baltic amber	Europe (Baltic Sea region)	A member of the family Dolichopodidae.	

==== Nematocerans ====
Name	Novelty	Status	Authors	Age	Type locality	Location	Notes	Images
Burmaculex edwardsi	Sp. nov	Valid	Szadziewski et al.	Cretaceous	Burmese amber	Myanmar	A mosquito.	
Burmaculex harbachi	Sp. nov	Valid	Szadziewski et al.	Cretaceous	Burmese amber	Myanmar	A mosquito.	
Burmaculex porczynskii	Sp. nov	Valid	Szadziewski et al.	Cretaceous	Burmese amber	Myanmar	A mosquito.	
Chaoborus abundans	Sp. nov	Valid	Baranov, Frese & McCurry in Baranov et al.	Miocene	McGraths Flat Lagerstätte	Australia	A species of Chaoborus.	
Chilelimnophila amorimi	Sp. nov	Valid	Krzemiński, Kania-Kłosok & Arillo in Krzemiński et al.	Cretaceous	Álava amber	Spain	A species of Chilelimnophila.	
Chilelimnophila parva	Sp. nov	Valid	Krzemiński, Kania-Kłosok & Arillo in Krzemiński et al.	Cretaceous	Burmese amber	Myanmar	A species of Chilelimnophila.	
Chilelimnophila wangi	Sp. nov	Valid	Krzemiński, Kania-Kłosok & Arillo in Krzemiński et al.	Cretaceous	Burmese amber	Myanmar	A species of Chilelimnophila.	
Cretodeuterophlebia	Gen. et sp. nov	Valid	Krzemiński, Skibińska & Kopeć in Krzemińska et al.	Late Cretaceous (Cenomanian)	Burmese amber	Myanmar	A member of the family Deuterophlebiidae. The type species is C. courtneyi.	
Cretopleciofungivora	Gen. et sp. nov	Valid	Zhang et al.	Cretaceous	Burmese amber	Myanmar	A member of Bibionomorpha belonging to the family Pleciofungivoridae. The type species is C. simpsoni.	
Crivoptychoptera	Gen. et sp. nov	Valid	Lukashevich & Ansorge	Late Triassic (Norian)		Germany	A member of the family Ptychopteridae. The type species is C. nebrias.	
Dohloboyia	Gen. et sp. nov	Valid	Lukashevich & Ansorge	Late Triassic (Norian)		Germany	A member of Bibionomorpha belonging to the family Boholdoyidae. The type species is D. triassica.	
Electroneura	Gen. et sp. nov	Valid	Amaral, Silva & Baranov in Silva et al.	Early Cretaceous (Barremian)	Lebanese amber	Lebanon	A member of the family Chironomidae belonging to the subfamily Tanypodinae. The type species is E. pinhoi.	
Gynoplistia fouldensensis	Sp. nov	Valid	Nel & Kaulfuss	Miocene (Aquitanian)	Foulden Maar Lagerstätte	New Zealand	A species of Gynoplistia.	
Maietta hoffeinsetta	Sp. nov	Valid	Krzemiński, Krzemińska & Santos in Krzemińska et al.	Eocene	Baltic amber	Europe (Baltic Sea region)	A species of Maietta.	
?Mailotrichocera jiyuanensis	Sp. nov	Valid	Azar & Lian	Middle Jurassic	Yangshuzhuang Formation	China	A member of the family Trichoceridae.	
Metarchilimonia andersoni	Sp. nov	Valid	Lukashevich	Late Triassic (Carnian)	Molteno Formation	South Africa	A member of the family Limoniidae.	
Nannotanyderus granieri	Sp. nov	Valid	Azar et al.	Early Cretaceous (Barremian)	Lebanese amber	Lebanon	A tanyderine belonging to the tribe Nannotanyderini.	
Plecia patriciae	Sp. nov	Valid	Nel, Nel & Garrouste	Oligocene		France	A species of Plecia.	
Protodeuterophlebia	Gen. et sp. nov	Valid	Krzemiński, Krzemińska & Soszyńska in Krzemińska et al.	Late Cretaceous (Cenomanian)	Burmese amber	Myanmar	A member of the family Deuterophlebiidae. The type species is P. oosterbroeki.	
Robsonomyia baltica	Sp. nov	Valid	Pełczyńska, Krzemiński & Blagoderov in Pełczyńska et al.	Eocene	Baltic amber	Europe (Baltic Sea region)	A member of the family Keroplatidae belonging to the subfamily Macrocerinae.	
Robsonomyia henningseni	Sp. nov	Valid	Pełczyńska, Krzemiński & Blagoderov in Pełczyńska et al.	Eocene	Baltic amber	Europe (Baltic Sea region)	A member of the family Keroplatidae belonging to the subfamily Macrocerinae.	
Tasiocera (Dasymolophilus) baltica	Sp. nov	Valid	Kania-Kłosok et al.	Eocene	Baltic amber	Europe (Baltic Sea region)	A species of Tasiocera.	
Tasiocera (Dasymolophilus) gorskii	Sp. nov	Valid	Kania-Kłosok et al.	Eocene	Baltic amber	Europe (Baltic Sea region)	A species of Tasiocera.	
Vladimiretskia	Gen. et sp. nov	Valid	Fedotova & Perkovsky in Fedotova, Vasilenko & Perkovsky	Eocene	Rovno amber	Ukraine	A member of the family Cecidomyiidae belonging to the subfamily Porricondylinae and the tribe Asynaptini. The type species is V. nathani.	

==== Dipteran research ====
- Putative Cretaceous mosquito Libanoculex intermedius is argued to be a member of the family Chaoboridae by Harbach (2024).
- Ševčík (2024) compares the holotype of Burmacrocera petiolata with macrocerine keroplatid specimens from the Cretaceous amber from Myanmar, and notes the difficulty of attempts to associate similar macrocerine forms with the holotype of B. petiolata.
- The first fossil representative of the subgenus Ristocordyla within the genus Brachypeza reported to date is described from the Eocene Baltic amber by Boudet et al. (2024).
- Amaral et al. (2024) describe new larval specimens of Qiyia jurassica from the Jurassic Daohugou Beds (China) and new fossil material of brachyceran larvae the Cretaceous amber from Myanmar, including larvae with morphology combining characters seen in members of the families Xylophagidae and Athericidae, and interpret the studied fossils as indicating that members of the group Stratiomyomorpha were abundant in the Cretaceous fauna and likely occupied the ecological functions which are occupied by extant members of more derived brachyceran groups.
- Fossil material of aquatic dipterans, including representatives of the family Chaoboridae which are absent from extant fauna of New Zealand, is described from the Miocene Foulden Maar Lagerstätte by Baranov, Haug & Kaulfuss (2024).

=== Mecopterans ===
Name	Novelty	Status	Authors	Age	Type locality	Location	Notes	Images
Jiyuanphlebia	Gen. et sp. nov	Valid	Lian	Middle Jurassic (Callovian)	Yangshuzhuang Formation	China	A member of the family Protorthophlebiidae. The type species is J. incompleta.	
Orthophlebia lini	Sp. nov	Valid	Lian & Huang in Lian et al.	Middle Jurassic	Yanan Formation	China	A member of the family Orthophlebiidae.	
Orthophlebia picta	Sp. nov	Valid	Lian	Middle Jurassic (Callovian)	Yangshuzhuang Formation	China	A member of the family Orthophlebiidae.	
Protorthophlebia curvata	Sp. nov	Valid	Lian	Middle Jurassic (Callovian)	Yangshuzhuang Formation	China	A member of the family Protorthophlebiidae.	
Protorthophlebia gracilis	Sp. nov	Valid	Lian	Middle Jurassic (Callovian)	Yangshuzhuang Formation	China	A member of the family Protorthophlebiidae.	
Quadrivena	Gen. et sp. nov	Valid	Lian	Middle Jurassic (Callovian)	Yangshuzhuang Formation	China	A member of the family Orthophlebiidae. The type species is Q. jiyuanensis.	
Torvimerope	Gen. et sp. nov	Valid	Zhang et al.	Cretaceous	Burmese amber	Myanmar	A member of the family Meropeidae. Genus includes new species T. cordatus.	
Turbidapsyche	Gen. et comb. et 3 sp. nov	Valid	Lian & Huang in Lian et al.	Late Permian to Late Triassic		China; Kyrgyzstan; Russia; South Korea; Ukraine	A member of the family Mesopsychidae. The type species is "Mesopsyche" dobrokhotovae Novokshonov (1997); genus also includes T. shcherbakovi (Novokshonov, 1997), T. justa (Novokshonov & Sukatsheva, 2001), T. ordinata (Novokshonov & Sukatsheva, 2001), T. tortiva (Novokshonov & Sukatsheva, 2001), T. gentica (Novokshonov & Sukatsheva, 2001), T. tongchuanensis (Hong, 2007), T. incompleta (Bashkuev, 2011), T. jinsuoguanensis (Lian, Cai & Huang, 2021) and T. liaoi (Lian, Cai & Huang, 2021), as well as new species T. orientalis, T. sparsanota and T. hongi.	

==== Mecopteran research ====
- Kaczmarek, Li & Soszyńska (2024) describe the first female specimen of Burmothauma eureka, preserved in a piece of the Cretaceous amber from Myanmar that also includes a mite belonging to the family Bdellidae, rove beetles belonging to the subfamilies Scydmaeninae and Staphylininae and flies belonging to the families Cecidomyiidae and Keroplatidae, and interpret both the morphological similarity of the studied specimen to extant Notiothauma reedi and the ecology of arthropods preserved in the same piece of amber as indicating that Cretaceous eomeropids were likely associated with forest litter environments.

== Clade Archaeorthoptera ==
=== †Caloneurodea ===
Name	Novelty	Status	Authors	Age	Type locality	Country	Notes	Images
Fusiogramma	Gen. et sp. nov	Valid	Boderau, Roques & Nel	Carboniferous (Moscovian)		France	The type species is F. minuta.	
Wappleria	Gen. et sp. nov		Santos, Diez & Nel	Carboniferous (Gzhelian)		Spain	A member of Caloneurodea. The type species is W. tremoris.	

=== Orthopterans ===
Name	Novelty	Status	Authors	Age	Type locality	Country	Notes	Images
Archaboilus ornatus	Sp. nov	Valid	Gu, Ren & Chen in Gu et al.	Middle Jurassic	Jiulongshan Formation	China	A member of the family Haglidae.	
Archaeoarmatus	Gen. et sp. nov	Valid	Kasalo et al.	Eocene	Messel Formation	Germany	A member of the family Tetrigidae belonging to the subfamily Batrachideinae. The type species is A. messelensis.	
Curvellipsoentomoolithus	Oogen et oosp nov		Lee et al	Oligocene	John Day Formation "Turtle Cove Member"	USA; Oregon	Preserved grasshopper eggs in a soil ootheca. The type oospecies C. laddi	
Gurenia	Gen. et comb. nov	Valid	Gorochov et al.	Middle Jurassic	Jiulongshan Formation	China	A member of the family Haglidae; a new genus for "Liassophyllum" caii Gu & Ren in Gu, Qiao & Ren (2012).	
Kallosripipteryx	Gen. et sp. nov		Zhao et al.	Cretaceous	Burmese amber	Myanmar	A member of the family Ripipterygidae. The type species is K. zhangi.	
Liassophyllum patriciae	Sp. nov	Valid	Gorochov et al.	Early Jurassic		United Kingdom	A member of Hagloidea of uncertain affinities.	
Messeltettix	Gen. et sp. nov	Valid	Kasalo et al.	Eocene	Messel Formation	Germany	A member of the family Tetrigidae belonging to the subfamily Batrachideinae. The type species is M. cryptoantennatus.	
Moban	Gen. et sp. nov		Hu & He in Hu, Li & He	Cretaceous	Burmese amber	Myanmar	A member of Caelifera belonging to the family Burmecaelidae. The type species is M. zhengzhemini.	
Palaeotrigonidium	Gen. et 2 sp. nov	Valid	Gu, Zhou & Yuan	Cretaceous (Albian–Cenomanian)	Burmese amber	Myanmar	A member of the family Trigonidiidae. The type species is P. concavoculus; genus also includes P. defectivus.	
Pararchaboilus	Gen. et comb. nov	Valid	Gu, Ren & Chen in Gu et al.	Early Cretaceous		United Kingdom	A member of the family Haglidae. The type species is "Cyrtophyllites" cretaceus Gorochov, Jarzembowski & Coram (2006).	
Probaisselcana kachinensis	Sp. nov		Zhou et al.	Cretaceous	Burmese amber	Myanmar	A member of the family Elcanidae.	
Rusmithia	Gen. et sp. nov	Valid	Skejo et al.	Eocene	Baltic amber	Russia; Kaliningrad Oblast	A batrachideine Tetrigidae pygmy grasshopper. The type species is R. gorochovi.	Rusmithia gorochovi
Sinelcana	Gen. et sp nov		Nel et al	Permian (Capitanian)	Yinping Formation	China	A member of Elcanoidea belonging to the family Permelcanidae. The type species is S. azari	
Sinolocustopsis	Gen. et 2 sp. nov	Disputed	Nel & Huang	Middle Jurassic	Yanan Formation	China	A member of the family Locustopsidae. The type species is S. elongatus; genus also includes S. brevis. Schall et al. (2025) transferred S. elongatus to the genus Locustopsis and S. brevis to the genus Mesolocustopsis.	
Subterroothecichnus	Igen et Isp nov		Lee et al	Oligocene	John Day Formation "Turtle Cove Member"	USA; Oregon	Preserved grasshopper soil ootheca with eggs inside. The type oospecies S. radialis	
Tricalcaratus	Gen. et sp. nov	Valid	Gu, Zhou & Yuan	Cretaceous (Albian–Cenomanian)	Burmese amber	Myanmar	A member of the family Trigonidiidae. The type species is T. longilineus.	
Vitimoilus gigantus	Sp. nov	Valid	Gu, Ren & Chen in Gu et al.	Early Cretaceous	Yixian Formation	China	A member of the family Haglidae.	

==== Orthopteran research ====
- Cadena-Castañeda et al. (2024) interpret the family Pseudogryllotalpidae as a junior synonym of the subtribe within the family Gryllidae and the tribe Sclerogryllini, and interpret Pseudogryllotalpa scalprata, Petilus zhengi and Unidigitus longialatus as synonyms of Pherodactylus micromorphus.
- Ferreira et al. (2024) reconstruct the left forewing venation of Picogryllus carentonensis, reporting the presence of the venation pattern compatible with the pattern proposed by Josse et al. (2023) for crickets.
- Ferreira et al. (2024) reconstruct the anatomy of the internal parts of the genitalia of a male specimen of Picogryllus carentonensis, and evaluate the tempo and mode of evolution of the family Oecanthidae, arguing that the family dates back to the Upper Jurassic.
- While describing structures interpreted as a grasshopper ootheca (egg pod) and eggs from the John Day Formation, Oregon, United States, Lee et al. advocate the use of the ootaxonomic nomenclatural system for description of insect egg fossils. They erect the new ichnofamily Entomoothecichnidae to accommodate the described oothecae fossils, and the new oofamily Entomoolithidae for "fossil eggs of entomological affinities".

== Clade Coleopterida ==
=== Coleopterans ===
==== Adephaga ====
Name	Novelty	Status	Authors	Age	Type locality	Country	Notes	Images
Lebia akinobuella	Sp. nov	Valid	Kirichenko-Babko, Kopeć & Krzemiński in Kirichenko-Babko et al.	Eocene	Baltic amber	Europe (Baltic Sea region)	A species of Lebia.	
Lebia baehri	Sp. nov	Valid	Kirichenko-Babko & Perkovsky in Kirichenko-Babko et al.	Eocene	Rovno amber	Ukraine	A species of Lebia.	
Loricera carsteni	Sp. nov	Valid	Li, Tihelka & Cai in Li et al.	Cretaceous	Burmese amber	Myanmar	A species of Loricera.	
Necronectulus lazarus	Sp. nov	Valid	Lee, Nam & Park	Early Cretaceous (Albian)	Jinju Formation	South Korea	A member of the family Trachypachidae.	
Psacodromeus rectus	Sp. nov	Valid	Lee, Nam & Park	Early Cretaceous (Albian)	Jinju Formation	South Korea	A member of the family Trachypachidae.	
Rhantus villumi	Sp. nov	Valid	Prokin et al.	Eocene	Fur Formation	Denmark	A species of Rhantus.	

==== Archostemata ====
Name	Novelty	Status	Authors	Age	Type locality	Country	Notes	Images
Brochocoleus sonidensis	Sp. nov		Tang et al.	Early Cretaceous	Damoguaihe Formation	China		
Cupes balticus	Sp. nov	Valid	Yamamoto	Eocene	Baltic amber	Russia (Kaliningrad Oblast)	A species of Cupes.	
Zygadenia dachaidanensis	Sp. nov		Song et al.	Early Jurassic	Xiaomeigou Formation	China		
Zygadenia haixiensis	Sp. nov		Song et al.	Early Jurassic	Xiaomeigou Formation	China		

==== Myxophaga ====
Name	Novelty	Status	Authors	Age	Type locality	Country	Notes	Images
Bezesporum huchengi	Sp. nov	Valid	Li, Huang & Cai	Cretaceous (Albian-Cenomanian)	Burmese amber	Myanmar	A member of the family Sphaeriusidae.	

==== Polyphaga ====
===== Bostrichiformia =====
Name	Novelty	Status	Authors	Age	Type locality	Country	Notes	Images
Carstenium	Gen. et sp. nov	Valid	Alekseev & Bukejs	Eocene	Baltic amber	Russia (Kaliningrad Oblast)	A member of the family Ptinidae belonging to the subfamily Eucradinae and the tribe Hedobiini. The type species is C. kensbargense.	
Elongatus	Gen. et sp. nov		Wang et al.	Cretaceous	Burmese amber	Myanmar	A member of the family Bostrichidae belonging to the subfamily Dinoderinae. The type species is E. kachinus.	
Melalgus cretaceus	Sp. nov	Valid	Háva	Cretaceous	Burmese amber	Myanmar	A species of Melalgus.	
Nicobium necrocrator	Sp. nov	Valid	Alekseev et al.	Eocene	Baltic amber	Russia (Kaliningrad Oblast)	A species of Nicobium.	
Poinarinius kachinus	Sp. nov		Wang, Peng & Wang in Wang et al.	Late Cretaceous (Cenomanian)	Burmese amber	Myanmar	A member of the family Bostrichidae belonging to the subfamily Alitrepaninae.	
Poinarinius vetus	Sp. nov		Wang, Peng & Wang in Wang et al.	Late Cretaceous (Cenomanian)	Burmese amber	Myanmar	A member of the family Bostrichidae belonging to the subfamily Alitrepaninae.	

===== Cucujiformia =====
Name	Novelty	Status	Authors	Age	Type locality	Country	Notes	Images
Aggerbille	Gen. et sp. nov	Valid	Legalov & Perkovsky in Legalov, Vasilenko & Perkovsky	Eocene	Danish amber	Denmark	A member of the family Mycetophagidae. The type species is A. havai.	
Agnathus groehni	Sp. nov		Alekseev, Bukejs & Pollock	Paleogene	Bitterfeld amber	Germany	A fire-coloured beetle.	
Alveoderes	Gen. et sp. nov	Valid	Li & Cai	Cretaceous (Albian-Cenomanian)	Burmese amber	Myanmar	A member of the family Bothrideridae belonging to the tribe Deretaphrini. The type species is A. yamamotoi.	
Atomaria (Anchicera) archibaldi	Sp. nov	Valid	Lyubarsky & Perkovsky in Lyubarsky et al.	Eocene	Rovno amber	Ukraine	A species of Atomaria.	
Atomaria (Anchicera) bukejsi	Sp. nov	Valid	Lyubarsky & Perkovsky in Lyubarsky et al.	Eocene	Rovno amber	Ukraine	A species of Atomaria.	
Ayitillus	Gen. et sp. nov		Kolibáč & Perkovsky	Late Cretaceous (Cenomanian)	Taimyr amber	Russia (Krasnoyarsk Krai)	A member of the family Cleridae. The type species is A. agapensis.	
Baltistena nigrispinata	Sp. nov	Valid	Batelka, Tröger & Bock in Boudinot et al.	Eocene	Baltic amber	Europe (Baltic Sea region)	A member of the family Mordellidae.	
Bulasconotus carinisternus	Sp. nov	Valid	Li, Ślipiński & Cai in Li et al.	Cretaceous (Albian-Cenomanian)	Burmese amber	Myanmar	A member of the family Zopheridae belonging to the subfamily Colydiinae and the tribe Synchitini.	
Cephalallus vitalii	Sp. nov	Valid	Legalov, Vasilenko & Perkovsky	Eocene (Ypresian)	Fur Formation	Denmark	A longhorn beetle belonging to the tribe Asemini.	
Ceratonotha	Gen. et sp. et comb. nov	Valid	Lyubarsky, Vasilenko & Perkovsky	Eocene	Danish amber	Denmark	A member of the family Erotylidae. Genus includes new species C. danica, as well as "Cycadophila" mumia Alekseev & Bukejs (2017).	
Cornuturetes	Gen. et sp. nov	Valid	Peris et al.	Cretaceous	Burmese amber	Myanmar	A sap beetle. The type species is C. elaphus.	
Coxelus carstengroehni	Sp. nov	Valid	Alekseev & Bukejs in Alekseev, McKellar & Bukejs	Eocene	Baltic amber	Russia (Kaliningrad Oblast)	A species of Coxelus.	
Cretabaltoraea	Gen. et sp. nov	Valid	Peris, Jelínek & Audisio in Peris et al.	Late Cretaceous (Cenomanian)	Burmese amber	Myanmar	A sap beetle belonging to the subfamily Apophisandrinae. The type species is C. volsella.	
Cretoprostominia	Gen. et sp. nov		Jiang, Liu & Chen	Cretaceous	Burmese amber	Myanmar	A member of the family Salpingidae. The type species is C. myanmarensis.	
Cryptophagus vorontsovi	Sp. nov	Valid	Lyubarsky & Perkovsky in Lyubarsky et al.	Eocene	Rovno amber	Ukraine	A species of Cryptophagus.	
Cryptophilus karinae	Sp. nov	Valid	Lyubarsky et al.	Eocene	Baltic amber	Russia (Kaliningrad Oblast)	A species of Cryptophilus.	
Diopsiretes	Gen. et sp. nov	Valid	Peris et al.	Cretaceous	Burmese amber	Myanmar	A sap beetle. The type species is D. corniger.	
Elektrocateres	Gen. et sp. nov		Kolibáč	Eocene	Bitterfeld amber	Germany	A member of the family Lophocateridae. The type species is E. rappsilberi.	
Elodophthalmus maksoudae	Sp. nov	Valid	Cai, Zhao & Azar	Early Cretaceous (Barremian)	Lebanese amber	Lebanon	A member of Tenebrionoidea belonging to the family Elodophthalmidae.	
Ferrucornus	Gen. et sp. nov		Hart et al.	Miocene	McGraths Flat Lagerstätte	Australia	A longhorn beetle. The type species is F. gulgongensis.	
Foveapeltis	Gen. et sp. nov	Valid	Li, Kolibáč, Liu & Cai in Li et al.	Cretaceous (Albian-Cenomanian)	Burmese amber	Myanmar	A member Cleroidea of uncertain affinities. The type species is F. rutai.	
Glyphonotum	Gen. et sp. nov	Valid	Li et al.	Cretaceous (Albian-Cenomanian)	Burmese amber	Myanmar	A member Tenebrionoidea with possible affinities with the family Pythidae. The type species is G. hsiaoi.	
Helioctamenus groehni	Sp. nov	Valid	Alekseev & Bukejs in Alekseev, McKellar & Bukejs	Eocene	Baltic amber	Russia (Kaliningrad Oblast)	A member of the family Zopheridae.	
Isocryptophilus	Gen. et sp. nov	Valid	Li & Cai in Li et al.	Cretaceous (Albian to Cenomanian)	Burmese amber	Myanmar	A possible member of the superfamily Erotyloidea. The type species is I. exilipunctus.	
Lasconotus tenebrisilvarum	Sp. nov	Valid	Alekseev & Bukejs in Alekseev, McKellar & Bukejs	Eocene	Baltic amber	Russia (Kaliningrad Oblast)	A species of Lasconotus.	
Leptilostis	Nom. nov	Valid	Ponting	Early Cretaceous	Xiagou Formation	China	A member of the family Curculionidae; a replacement name for Tetillopsis Hong (1982).	
Micrambe tristis	Sp. nov	Valid	Lyubarsky et al.	Eocene	Danish amber	Denmark	A species of Micrambe.	
Micrambe danica	Sp. nov	Valid	Lyubarsky & Perkovsky in Lyubarsky et al.	Eocene	Danish amber	Denmark	A species of Micrambe.	
Monochamus gehleri	Sp. nov	Valid	Vitali	Pliocene		Germany	A species of Monochamus.	
Monochamus willershausensis	Comb. nov	Valid	(Schmidt)	Pliocene		Germany	A species of Monochamus; moved from Monochamoides willershausensis Schmidt (1967).	
Orthocis kompantsevi	Sp. nov	Valid	Legalov & Perkovsky in Legalov, Vasilenko & Perkovsky	Eocene	Danish amber	Denmark	A species of Orthocis.	
Orthocis larssoni	Sp. nov	Valid	Legalov & Perkovsky in Legalov, Vasilenko & Perkovsky	Eocene	Danish amber	Denmark	A species of Orthocis.	
Orthocis vilhelmseni	Sp. nov	Valid	Legalov & Perkovsky in Legalov, Vasilenko & Perkovsky	Eocene	Danish amber	Denmark	A species of Orthocis.	
Paha vanivanitatum	Sp. nov	Valid	Alekseev & Bukejs in Alekseev, McKellar & Bukejs	Eocene	Baltic amber	Russia (Kaliningrad Oblast)	A species of Paha.	
Palaeosphryon	Gen. et sp. nov	Valid	Nel, Kirejtshuk & Garrouste	Paleocene		France	A longhorn beetle belonging to the subfamily Prioninae. The type species is P. menatensis.	
Palaeosymbius	Gen. et 2 sp. nov		Arriaga-Varela et al.	Late Cretaceous	Burmese amber	Myanmar	A member of the family Anamorphidae. The type species is P. groehni; genus also includes P. mesozoicus.	
Prionobrachium gusakovi	Sp. nov	Valid	Legalov	Holocene	Colombian copal	Colombia	A member of the family Curculionidae belonging to the subfamily Curculioninae and the tribe Prionobrachiini.	
Protokateretes magnascapulae	Sp. nov		Zhao et al.	Cretaceous	Burmese amber	Myanmar	Originally described as a member of the family Kateretidae; subsequently argued to be a sap beetle belonging to the subfamily Apophisandrinae.	
Protokateretes rectangulum	Sp. nov		Zhao et al.	Cretaceous	Burmese amber	Myanmar	Originally described as a member of the family Kateretidae; subsequently argued to be a sap beetle belonging to the subfamily Apophisandrinae.	
Ripidinelia daiboyui	Sp. nov	Valid	Li & Cai in Li, Huang & Cai	Cretaceous (Albian to Cenomanian)	Burmese amber	Myanmar	A member of the family Ripiphoridae belonging to the subfamily Ripidiinae.	
"Ripilarva"	2 sp. nov	Valid	Batelka & Beutel in Batelka et al.	Cretaceous		Canada; Myanmar; Russia	A collective group name for fossil conicocephalate larvae of ripiphorids (probably belonging to the subfamily Ripidiinae). Includes new species "R." parabolica and "R." kachinensis from the Cretaceous amber of Myanmar, as well as unnamed species from the Cretaceous ambers from Manitoba (Canada) and Taymyr (Russia).	
Spinanitidula	Gen. et sp. nov	Valid	Zhao & Cai in Zhao et al.	Cretaceous	Burmese amber	Myanmar	A sap beetle. The type species is S. nigrumflavo.	
Taphioporus hanseaticus	Sp. nov	Valid	Bukejs, Moseyko & Alekseev	Eocene	Baltic amber	Europe (Baltic Sea region)	A leaf beetle.	
Thallisellites augustinusii	Sp. nov	Valid	Lyubarsky & Perkovsky in Lyubarsky et al.	Eocene	Baltic amber	Russia (Kaliningrad Oblast)	A member of the family Erotylidae belonging to the subfamily Languriinae and the tribe Thallisellini.	
Thanatoplagia	Gen. et sp. nov	Valid	Alekseev & Bukejs in Alekseev, McKellar & Bukejs	Eocene	Baltic amber	Russia (Kaliningrad Oblast)	A member of the family Zopheridae. The type species is T. tamutisi.	
Trematosphindus kirejtshuki	Sp. nov	Valid	Legalov, Vasilenko & Perkovsky	Late Cretaceous (Cenomanian)	Dolgan Formation (Taimyr amber)	Russia (Krasnoyarsk Krai)	A member of the family Sphindidae.	
Turgaphagites	Gen. et comb. nov	Valid	Lyubarsky & Perkovsky in Lyubarsky et al.	Early Cretaceous (Barremian–Aptian)	Turga Formation	Russia (Zabaykalsky Krai)	A member of the family Cryptophagidae. The type species is "Cryptophagites" clavatus Ponomarenko (1990).	
Usechus andrushchenkoi	Sp. nov	Valid	Alekseev & Bukejs in Alekseev, McKellar & Bukejs	Eocene	Baltic amber	Russia (Kaliningrad Oblast)	A species of Usechus.	
Ventiala	Gen. et sp. nov		Hart et al.	Miocene	McGraths Flat Lagerstätte	Australia	A longhorn beetle. The type species is V. beattiei.	
Yassibum	Gen. et sp. nov	Valid	Li et al.	Cretaceous (Albian-Cenomanian)	Burmese amber	Myanmar	A member of Coccinelloidea, possibly belonging to the subfamily Anamorphidae. The type species is Y. yoshitomii.	

===== Elateriformia =====
Name	Novelty	Status	Authors	Age	Type locality	Country	Notes	Images
Burmomiles angustipennis	Sp. nov		Yang, Zhao & Liu	Cretaceous	Burmese amber	Myanmar	A soldier beetle.	
Burmomiles brevicollis	Sp. nov		Yang, Zhao & Liu	Cretaceous	Burmese amber	Myanmar	A soldier beetle.	
Burmomiles dentatus	Sp. nov		Yang, Zhao & Liu	Cretaceous	Burmese amber	Myanmar	A soldier beetle.	
Burmomiles dominikiweissbachi	Comb. nov	Valid	(Fanti & Müller)	Cretaceous	Burmese amber	Myanmar	A soldier beetle. Moved from Sanaungulus dominikiweissbachi Fanti & Müller (2022).	
Burmomiles ellenbergeri	Comb. nov	Valid	(Fanti & Damgaard)	Cretaceous	Burmese amber	Myanmar	A soldier beetle. Moved from Poinarelektronmiles ellenbergeri Fanti & Damgaard (2020).	
Burmomiles kachinensis	Comb. nov	Valid	(Fanti & Müller)	Cretaceous	Burmese amber	Myanmar	A soldier beetle. Moved from Sanaungulus kachinensis Fanti & Müller (2022).	
Burmomiles lethi	Comb. nov	Valid	(Fanti & Damgaard)	Cretaceous	Burmese amber	Myanmar	A soldier beetle. Moved from Sanaungulus lethi Fanti & Damgaard (2020).	
Burmomiles recticollis	Sp. nov		Yang, Zhao & Liu	Cretaceous	Burmese amber	Myanmar	A soldier beetle.	
Cacomorphocerus simkei	Sp. nov	Valid	Fanti	Eocene	Baltic amber	Russia (Kaliningrad Oblast)	A soldier beetle belonging to the subfamily Cantharinae and the tribe Cacomorphocerini.	
Cenomana annieae	Sp. nov		Hsiao & Otto	Late Cretaceous (Cenomanian)	Burmese amber	Myanmar		
Cenomana grandis	Sp. nov	Valid	Han et al.	Cretaceous	Burmese amber	Myanmar	A member of the family Eucnemidae belonging to the subfamily Melasinae and the tribe Dirhagini.	
Contacyphon pomahakaensis	Sp. nov	Valid	Ruta in Kaulfuss et al.	Oligocene	Pomahaka Formation	New Zealand	A species of Contacyphon.	
Cretoctesis	Gen. et sp. nov		Molino-Olmedo	Late Cretaceous (Cenomanian)	Burmese amber	Myanmar	A member of the family Buprestidae. The type species is C. conchimillanae. Published online in 2024, but the issue date is listed as December 2023.	
Eolamprohiza	Gen. et sp. nov	Valid	Kazantsev	Eocene	Baltic amber	Europe (Baltic Sea region)	A firefly belonging to the subfamily Lamprohizinae. The type species is E. andrushchenkoi.	
Eucinetus debilispinus	Sp. nov	Valid	Li & Cai in Li et al.	Cretaceous	Burmese amber	Myanmar	A species of Eucinetus.	
Eucinetus panghongae	Sp. nov	Valid	Li & Cai in Li et al.	Cretaceous	Burmese amber	Myanmar	A species of Eucinetus.	
Eucinetus zhenhuai	Sp. nov	Valid	Li & Cai in Li et al.	Cretaceous	Burmese amber	Myanmar	A species of Eucinetus.	
Fiegelia gracilis	Sp. nov	Valid	Han, Muona & Ren	Cretaceous	Burmese amber	Myanmar	A member of the family Eucnemidae.	
Fiegelia longicornis	Sp. nov	Valid	Han, Muona & Ren	Cretaceous	Burmese amber	Myanmar	A member of the family Eucnemidae.	
Fiegelia serraticornis	Sp. nov	Valid	Han, Muona & Ren	Cretaceous	Burmese amber	Myanmar	A member of the family Eucnemidae.	
Flammarionella	Gen. et sp. nov		Cai, Ballantyne & Kundrata in Cai et al.	Cretaceous (Albian/Cenomanian)	Burmese amber	Myanmar	A firefly belonging to the stem group of the subfamily Luciolinae. The type species is F. hehaikuni.	
Grouvellinus rajasthanensis	Sp. nov	Valid	Kirejtshuk et al.	Eocene	Palana Formation	India	A species of Grouvellinus.	
Lychnacris electron	Sp. nov	Valid	Roza et al.	Miocene	Dominican amber	Dominican Republic	A firefly.	
Lycocerus albovacca	Sp. nov	Valid	Kazantsev & Perkovsky in Kazantsev, Legalov & Perkovsky	Eocene (Priabonian)	Rovno amber	Ukraine	A soldier beetle belonging to the tribe Cantharini.	
Malthinus fabriziofantii	Sp. nov	Valid	Pankowski	Eocene	Prussian Formation (Baltic amber)	Russia (Kaliningrad Oblast)	A soldier beetle, a species of Malthinus.	
Malthodes maierae	Sp. nov	Valid	Pankowski & Fanti	Eocene	Baltic amber	Russia (Kaliningrad Oblast)	A species of Malthodes.	
Malthodes maximiliani	Sp. nov	Valid	Fanti & Pankowski	Eocene	Baltic amber	Poland	A species of Malthodes.	
Malthodes vallombrosa	Sp. nov	Valid	Parisi & Fanti	Eocene	Baltic amber	Europe (Baltic Sea region)	A species of Malthodes.	
Myall ovata	Sp. nov	Valid	Han, Muona & Ren	Cretaceous	Burmese amber	Myanmar	A member of the family Eucnemidae.	
Paleoselatosomus	Gen. et sp. nov	Valid	Kundrata, Triskova & Prosvirov	Late Cretaceous (Cenomanian)	Burmese amber	Myanmar	A click beetle belonging to the subfamily Dendrometrinae and the tribe Selatosomini. The type species is P. cretaceus.	
Protomicrorhagus latus	Sp. nov	Valid	Han et al.	Cretaceous	Burmese amber	Myanmar	A member of the family Eucnemidae belonging to the subfamily Melasinae and the tribe Dirhagini.	
Sanaungulus cuaroni	Comb. nov	Valid	(Bramanti & Fanti)	Cretaceous	Burmese amber	Myanmar	A soldier beetle. Moved from Poinarelektronmiles cuaroni Bramanti & Fanti (2022).	
Sanaungulus elongaticollis	Sp. nov	Valid	Yang, Zhao & Liu	Late Cretaceous (Cenomanian)	Burmese amber	Myanmar	A soldier beetle.	
Sanaungulus longicornis	Sp. nov	Valid	Yang, Zhao & Liu	Late Cretaceous (Cenomanian)	Burmese amber	Myanmar	A soldier beetle.	
Sanaungulus marginalis	Sp. nov	Valid	Yang, Zhao & Liu	Late Cretaceous (Cenomanian)	Burmese amber	Myanmar	A soldier beetle.	
Sanaungulus undecimus	Sp. nov	Valid	Yang, Zhao & Liu	Late Cretaceous (Cenomanian)	Burmese amber	Myanmar	A soldier beetle.	

===== Scarabaeiformia =====
Name	Novelty	Status	Authors	Age	Type locality	Country	Notes	Images
Dicholucanus khasurtensis	Sp. nov	Valid	Arakelyan & Yan	Early Cretaceous		Russia	A stag beetle belonging to the subfamily Lucaninae.	
Gomphocopris	Gen. et sp. nov	Valid	Tello, Pino, Rossini & Verdú in Tello et al.	Pleistocene		Chile	A member of the family Scarabaeidae belonging to the subfamily Scarabaeinae and the tribe Homocoprini. The type species is G. ashworthi.	
Prodiphyllostoma	Gen. et sp. nov		Yamamoto	Cretaceous	Burmese amber	Myanmar	A false stag beetle. The type species is P. inexpectatum.	
Prostreptocerus	Gen. et sp. nov	Valid	Yu & Cai in Yu et al.	Cretaceous	Burmese amber	Myanmar	A stag beetle belonging to the subfamily Lampriminae. The type species is P. burmiticus.	

===== Staphyliniformia =====
Name	Novelty	Status	Authors	Age	Type locality	Country	Notes	Images
Anapleus punctulatus	Sp. nov	Valid	Simon-Pražák et al.	Early Cretaceous (Albian)	Hkamti amber	Myanmar	A species of Anapleus.	
Bacanius caterinoi	Sp. nov	Valid	Sokolov & Perkovsky in Sokolov et al.	Eocene	Rovno amber	Ukraine	A species of Bacanius.	
Chiquiticus cornelli	Comb. nov	Valid	(Chatzimanolis & Engel)	Miocene (Burdigalian)	Dominican amber	Dominican Republic	A rove beetle belonging to the subfamily Staphylininae; moved from "Heterothops" cornelli Chatzimanolis & Engel (2013).	
Chiquiticus infernalis	Comb. nov	Valid	(Chatzimanolis & Engel)	Miocene (Burdigalian)	Dominican amber	Dominican Republic	A rove beetle belonging to the subfamily Staphylininae; moved from "Heterothops" infernalis Chatzimanolis & Engel (2013).	
Cretafrica	Gen. et sp. nov	Valid	Mnguni, McKay & Badenhorst	Late Cretaceous		Botswana	A rove beetle belonging to the subfamily Mycetoporinae. The type species is C. orapensis.	
Cretomalus	Gen. et sp. nov	Valid	Simon-Pražák et al.	Late Cretaceous (Cenomanian)	Burmese amber	Myanmar	A member of the family Histeridae belonging to the subfamily Dendrophilinae and the tribe Paromalini. The type species is C. tibiodentatus.	
Dactylonudon	Gen. et sp. nov	Valid	Janák	Cretaceous	Burmese amber	Myanmar	A rove beetle belonging to the subfamily Paederinae. The type species is D. longitarsus.	
Dibelonetes antecessor	Sp. nov	Valid	Janák	Eocene	Baltic amber	Russia (Kaliningrad Oblast)	A rove beetle belonging to the subfamily Paederinae.	
Eutriptus capeki	Sp. nov	Valid	Simon-Pražák, Alekseev & Prokop	Eocene	Baltic amber	Russia (Kaliningrad Oblast)	A member of the family Histeridae.	
Festenus microraptor	Sp. nov	Valid	Mainda	Early Cretaceous (Albian)	Hkamti amber	Myanmar	A rove beetle belonging to the subfamily Steninae.	
Laetopsia leei	Sp. nov	Valid	Lee et al.	Early Cretaceous (Albian)	Jinju Formation	South Korea	A member of Hydrophiloidea.	
Loeblitoides latus	Sp. nov	Valid	Jałoszyński & Szawaryn	Cretaceous	Burmese amber	Myanmar	A rove beetle belonging to the subfamily Scydmaeninae and the tribe Stenichnini .	
Mesostaphylinus orapa	Sp. nov		Mnguni, McKay & Badenhorst	Late Cretaceous (probably Turonian)		Botswana	A rove beetle belonging to the subfamily Paederinae.	
Miculissima	Gen. et sp. nov	Valid	Simon-Pražák et al.	Late Cretaceous (Cenomanian)	Burmese amber	Myanmar	A member of the family Histeridae of uncertain affinities. The type species is M. excavata.	
Midinudon elongatus	Sp. nov	Valid	Janák	Cretaceous	Burmese amber	Myanmar	A rove beetle belonging to the subfamily Paederinae.	
Nazeris antiquus	Sp. nov	Valid	Janák	Eocene	Baltic amber	Russia (Kaliningrad Oblast)	A rove beetle belonging to the subfamily Paederinae.	
Nazeris damzeni	Sp. nov	Valid	Janák	Eocene	Rovno amber	Ukraine	A rove beetle belonging to the subfamily Paederinae.	
Nazeris electrus	Sp. nov	Valid	Janák	Eocene	Rovno amber	Ukraine	A rove beetle belonging to the subfamily Paederinae.	
Paederus schmidti	Comb. nov	Valid	(Korge)	Pliocene		Germany	A species of Paederus. Moved from Pliosyntomium schmidti Korge (1967).	
Palaeabraeus	Gen. et sp. nov	Valid	Simon-Pražák et al.	Late Cretaceous (Cenomanian)	Burmese amber	Myanmar	A member of the family Histeridae belonging to the subfamily Abraeinae and the tribe Abraeini. The type species is P. glabrus.	
Paleothius mckayi	Sp. nov	Valid	Mnguni, Badenhorst & Bamford	Late Cretaceous (probably Turonian)		Botswana	A rove beetle belonging to the subfamily Staphylininae.	
Pantostictus hirsutus	Sp. nov	Valid	Simon-Pražák et al.	Late Cretaceous (Cenomanian)	Burmese amber	Myanmar	A member of the family Histeridae belonging to the subfamily Abraeinae and the tribe Pantostictini.	
Phasmister kraliceki	Sp. nov	Valid	Simon-Pražák et al.	Late Cretaceous (Cenomanian)	Burmese amber	Myanmar	A member of the family Histeridae belonging to the subfamily Onthophilinae.	
Phasmister planatus	Sp. nov	Valid	Simon-Pražák et al.	Late Cretaceous (Cenomanian)	Burmese amber	Myanmar	A member of the family Histeridae belonging to the subfamily Onthophilinae.	
Placatister	Gen. et sp. nov	Valid	Simon-Pražák et al.	Late Cretaceous (Cenomanian)	Burmese amber	Myanmar	A member of the family Histeridae of uncertain affinities. The type species is P. cascus.	
Prodigister	Gen. et sp. nov	Valid	Simon-Pražák et al.	Late Cretaceous (Cenomanian)	Burmese amber	Myanmar	A member of the family Histeridae of uncertain affinities. The type species is P. tricostatus.	
Pseudacritus	Gen. et sp. nov	Valid	Simon-Pražák et al.	Late Cretaceous (Cenomanian)	Burmese amber	Myanmar	A member of the family Histeridae belonging to the subfamily Abraeinae. The type species is P. extinctus.	
Schaufussinus	Gen. et sp. nov	Valid	Yin & Cai	Eocene	Baltic amber	Europe (Baltic Sea region)	A rove beetle belonging to the supertribe Pselaphitae, with similarities to members of the tribes Arhytodini and Pselaphini. The type species is S. longiscapus.	
Tachyporus burmiticus	Sp. nov		Yamamoto	Cretaceous	Burmese amber	Myanmar	A species of Tachyporus.	
Thoracophorus balticus	Sp. nov		Yamamoto et al.	Eocene	Baltic amber	Europe (Baltic Sea region)	A species of Thoracophorus.	
Vicelva rasilis	Sp. nov		Li et al.	Cretaceous (Albian to Cenomanian)	Burmese amber	Myanmar	A rove beetle belonging to the subfamily Phloeocharinae.	

===== Other Polyphaga =====
Name	Novelty	Status	Authors	Age	Type locality	Country	Notes	Images
Benemerita	Gen. et sp. nov	Disputed	Molino-Olmedo	Late Cretaceous (Cenomanian)	Kachin amber	Myanmar	Originally described as a member of the family Ptinidae belonging to the subfamily Dryophilinae; subsequently argued by Legalov & Legalov (2025) to be a member of the family Cerophytidae and a junior synonym of Amberophytum. The type species is B. burmitica. Published online in 2025, but the issue date is listed as December 2024.	

==== Coleopteran research ====
- A review of the evolutionary history of beetles during the late Paleozoic and Mesozoic is published by Beutel et al. (2024).
- A study on the diversity of Late Triassic (Norian) beetles from the Cow Branch and Walnut Cove formations (Virginia and North Carolina, United States) is published by Criscione-Vastano & Grimaldi (2024), who identify the presence of 100 distinct beetle morphotypes.
- Zippel et al. (2024) revise the fossil record of archostematan larvae and describe the first archostematan larva from the Eocene Baltic amber.
- Haug et al. (2024) describe new fossils of adephagan larvae, including the first finding from the Early Cretaceous Jehol Biota, and interpret the studied fossils as indicative of increase of morphological diversity of adephagan larvae over time, with no recognisable losses found by the authors.
- Tello, Libido & Moctezuma (2024) describe new fossil material of Onthophagus pilauco from the Pleistocene strata from the Pilauco Bajo site (Chile), providing new information on the morphology of this beetle, and interpret the studied fossils as indicative of the presence of sexual dimorphism in O. pilauco.
- Yamamoto & Newton (2024) report the discovery of the first aleocharine rove beetle (a member of the genus Cypha) from the Eocene Bitterfeld amber (Germany).
- The first fossil click beetle and ptilodactylid larvae reported to date are described from the Cretaceous amber from Myanmar by Zippel et al. (2024).
- A redescription of Aphytocerus communis, Baissophytum convexum and Baissopsis ampla is published by Telnov et al. (2024).
- A study on the evolutionary history of the family Belidae, as indicated by molecular data and fossil record, is published by Li et al. (2024), who interpret their findings as indicating that the family originated approximately 138 million years ago in Gondwana, as well as indicating that conifers were most likely ancestral hosts of the studied weevils.

== Clade Dictyoptera ==
Name	Novelty	Status	Authors	Age	Type locality	Country	Notes	Images
Akinisia	Gen. et sp. nov	Valid	Vršanský	Late Jurassic (Kimmeridgian)	Karabastau Formation	Kazakhstan	A possible member of the family Liberiblattinidae. The type species is A. chorevei.	
Alderblattina	Gen. et sp. nov	Valid	Swaby, Coe & Ross	Early Jurassic (Toarcian)	Whitby Mudstone	United Kingdom	A cockroach belonging to the superfamily Caloblattinoidea and the family Rhipidoblattinidae. The type species is A. simmsi.	
Angustitermes	Gen. et sp. nov	Valid	Jiang, Zhao & Ren in Jiang et al.	Late Cretaceous (Cenomanian)	Burmese amber	Myanmar	A termite belonging to the family Mastotermitidae. The type species is A. reflexus.	
Ano mal	Sp. nov	Valid	Vršanský	Late Jurassic (Kimmeridgian)	Karabastau Formation	Kazakhstan	A member of the family Liberiblattinidae.	
Ano naslosa	Sp. nov	Valid	Vršanský	Late Jurassic (Kimmeridgian)	Karabastau Formation	Kazakhstan	A member of the family Liberiblattinidae.	
Ano ona	Sp. nov	Valid	Vršanský	Late Jurassic (Kimmeridgian)	Karabastau Formation	Kazakhstan	A member of the family Liberiblattinidae.	
Ano palindrom	Sp. nov	Valid	Vršanský	Late Jurassic (Kimmeridgian)	Karabastau Formation	Kazakhstan	A member of the family Liberiblattinidae.	
Ano si	Sp. nov	Valid	Vršanský	Late Jurassic (Kimmeridgian)	Karabastau Formation	Kazakhstan	A member of the family Liberiblattinidae.	
Ano tak	Sp. nov	Valid	Vršanský	Late Jurassic (Kimmeridgian)	Karabastau Formation	Kazakhstan	A member of the family Liberiblattinidae.	
Aposema	Gen. et 2 sp. nov	Valid	Vršanský	Late Jurassic (Kimmeridgian) to Late Cretaceous (Turonian)	Karabastau Formation	Kazakhstan; Russia (Khabarovsk Krai)	A member of the family Caloblattinidae. The type species is A. gigantenna Vršanský from the Upper Jurassic Karabastau Formation in Kazakhstan; genus also includes A. chochoy Vršanský & Kováčová in Vršanský et al. (2024) from the Turonian Emanra Formation (Khabarovsk Krai, Russia).	
Asvab	Gen. et sp. nov	Valid	Vršanský	Late Jurassic (Kimmeridgian)	Karabastau Formation	Kazakhstan	A member of the family Blattulidae. The type species is A. bavsa.	
Aurora	Fam. et gen. et sp. nov	Junior homonym	Vršanský & Kováčová in Vršanský et al.	Probably Late Cretaceous		Russia (Sakha Republic)	A member of Mantodea, the type genus of the new family Auroridae. The type species is A. floris. The generic name is preoccupied by Aurora Ragonot (1887) and Aurora Sollas (1888).	
Blattula ahanaha	Sp. nov	Valid	Vršanský	Late Jurassic (Kimmeridgian)	Karabastau Formation	Kazakhstan	A member of the family Blattulidae.	
Blattula druha	Sp. nov	Valid	Vršanský	Late Jurassic (Kimmeridgian)	Karabastau Formation	Kazakhstan	A member of the family Blattulidae.	
Blattula fragilia	Sp. nov	Valid	Vršanský	Late Jurassic (Kimmeridgian)	Karabastau Formation	Kazakhstan	A member of the family Blattulidae.	
Blattula gracilicosta	Sp. nov	Valid	Vršanský	Late Jurassic (Kimmeridgian)	Karabastau Formation	Kazakhstan	A member of the family Blattulidae.	
Blattula kmitala	Sp. nov	Valid	Vršanský in Vršanský et al.	Early Cretaceous	Batylykh Formation	Russia (Sakha Republic)	A member of the family Blattulidae.	
Blattula microscopica	Sp. nov	Valid	Vršanský	Late Jurassic (Kimmeridgian)	Karabastau Formation	Kazakhstan	A member of the family Blattulidae.	
Blattula nebude	Sp. nov	Valid	Vršanský	Late Jurassic (Kimmeridgian)	Karabastau Formation	Kazakhstan	A member of the family Blattulidae.	
Blattula semptemtrionala	Sp. nov	Valid	Vršanský & Kováčová in Vršanský et al.	Late Jurassic	Khaya Formation	Russia (Sakha Republic)	A member of the family Blattulidae.	
Blattula summa	Sp. nov	Valid	Vršanský	Late Jurassic (Kimmeridgian)	Karabastau Formation	Kazakhstan	A member of the family Blattulidae.	
Blattula zapalis	Sp. nov	Valid	Vršanský & Kováčová in Vršanský et al.	Late Jurassic	Khaya Formation	Russia (Sakha Republic)	A member of the family Blattulidae.	
Caloblattina laesis	Sp. nov	Valid	Vršanský	Late Jurassic (Kimmeridgian)	Karabastau Formation	Kazakhstan	A member of the family Caloblattinidae.	
Caloblattina polaris	Sp. nov	Valid	Vršanský et Kováčová in Vršanský et al.	Late Cretaceous (Turonian)	Emanra Formation	Russia (Khabarovsk Krai)	A member of the family Caloblattinidae.	
Cameloblatta stress	Sp. nov	Valid	Vršanský	Late Jurassic (Kimmeridgian)	Karabastau Formation	Kazakhstan	A member of the family Raphidiomimidae.	
Chuanblatta stalosa	Sp. nov	Valid	Vršanský	Late Jurassic (Kimmeridgian)	Karabastau Formation	Kazakhstan	A member of the family Raphidiomimidae.	
Clypeblattula	Gen. et sp. nov		Zhang, Chen & Luo	Early Cretaceous	Laiyang Formation	China	A member of the family Blattulidae. The type species is C. panda.	
Cratovitisma vandekampi	Sp. nov	Valid	Vršanský in Vršanský et al.	Late Cretaceous	Ognevka Formation	Russia	A member of the family Umenocoleidae.	
Cretaholocompsa karatauensis	Sp. nov	Valid	Vršanský	Late Jurassic (Kimmeridgian)	Karabastau Formation	Kazakhstan	A member of the family Corydiidae belonging to the subfamily Latindiinae.	
Decomposita apicata	Sp. nov	Valid	Vršanský	Late Jurassic (Kimmeridgian)	Karabastau Formation	Kazakhstan	A member of the family Raphidiomimidae.	
Decomposita basquatirgis	Sp. nov	Valid	Vršanský	Late Jurassic (Kimmeridgian)	Karabastau Formation	Kazakhstan	A member of the family Raphidiomimidae.	
Decomposita pentavisia	Sp. nov	Valid	Vršanský	Late Jurassic (Kimmeridgian)	Karabastau Formation	Kazakhstan	A member of the family Raphidiomimidae.	
Decomposita tristriata	Sp. nov	Valid	Vršanský	Late Jurassic (Kimmeridgian)	Karabastau Formation	Kazakhstan	A member of the family Raphidiomimidae.	
Divocina polnoci	Sp. nov	Valid	Vršanský	Late Jurassic (Kimmeridgian)	Karabastau Formation	Kazakhstan	A member of the family Raphidiomimidae.	
Ectobius amberscapeus	Sp. nov	Valid	Vršanský et al.	Eocene	Baltic amber	Russia (Kaliningrad Oblast)	A species of Ectobius.	
Ectobius danekrae	Sp. nov	Valid	Anisyutkin, Vasilenko & Perkovsky	Eocene	Danish amber	Denmark	A species of Ectobius.	
Elisama prelistama	Sp. nov	Valid	Vršanský	Late Jurassic (Kimmeridgian)	Karabastau Formation	Kazakhstan	A member of the family Blattulidae.	
Elisamoides sediomasle	Sp. nov	Valid	Vršanský	Late Jurassic (Kimmeridgian)	Karabastau Formation	Kazakhstan	A member of the family Liberiblattinidae.	
Falcatusiblatta casovec	Sp. nov	Valid	Vršanský	Late Jurassic (Kimmeridgian)	Karabastau Formation	Kazakhstan	A member of the family Raphidiomimidae.	
Falcatusiblatta disrupta	Sp. nov	Valid	Vršanský	Late Jurassic (Kimmeridgian)	Karabastau Formation	Kazakhstan	A member of the family Raphidiomimidae.	
Falcatusiblatta storozhenkoi	Sp. nov	Valid	Vršanský	Late Jurassic (Kimmeridgian)	Karabastau Formation	Kazakhstan	A member of the family Raphidiomimidae.	
Falcatusiblatta tooold	Sp. nov	Valid	Vršanský	Late Jurassic (Kimmeridgian)	Karabastau Formation	Kazakhstan	A member of the family Raphidiomimidae.	
Falcatusiblatta zaloha	Sp. nov	Valid	Vršanský	Late Jurassic (Kimmeridgian)	Karabastau Formation	Kazakhstan	A member of the family Raphidiomimidae.	
Fosilia	Gen. et sp. nov	Valid	Vršanský	Late Jurassic (Kimmeridgian)	Karabastau Formation	Kazakhstan	A member of Raphidiomimoidea belonging to the family Latiblattidae. The type species is F. tubuliovipositorica.	
Hodotermopsella	Gen. et sp. nov	Valid	Engel & Jouault	Early Cretaceous (Albian)	Hkamti amber	Myanmar	A termite belonging to the family Hodotermopsidae. The type species is H. novella.	
Hra na	Sp. nov	Valid	Vršanský & Kováčová in Vršanský et al.	Late Cretaceous (Cenomanian–Turonian)	Arkagala Formation	Russia (Magadan Oblast)	A member of the family Liberiblattinidae.	
Hra nice	Sp. nov	Valid	Vršanský	Late Jurassic (Kimmeridgian)	Karabastau Formation	Kazakhstan	A member of the family Liberiblattinidae.	
Katatychi	Gen. et sp. nov	Valid	Vršanský	Late Jurassic (Kimmeridgian)	Karabastau Formation	Kazakhstan	A member of the family Liberiblattinidae. The type species is K. symptosi.	
Latiblatta osud	Sp. nov	Valid	Vršanský	Late Jurassic (Kimmeridgian)	Karabastau Formation	Kazakhstan	A member of Raphidiomimoidea belonging to the family Latiblattidae.	
Liadoblattina crassivenata	Sp. nov	Valid	Vršanský	Late Jurassic (Kimmeridgian)	Karabastau Formation	Kazakhstan	A member of the family Raphidiomimidae.	
Liberiblattina cipka	Sp. nov	Valid	Vršanský	Late Jurassic (Kimmeridgian)	Karabastau Formation	Kazakhstan	A member of the family Liberiblattinidae.	
Liberiblattina cunicula	Sp. nov	Valid	Vršanský	Late Jurassic (Kimmeridgian)	Karabastau Formation	Kazakhstan	A member of the family Liberiblattinidae.	
Liberiblattina kontrapunktata	Sp. nov	Valid	Vršanský	Late Jurassic (Kimmeridgian)	Karabastau Formation	Kazakhstan	A member of the family Liberiblattinidae.	
Liberiblattina kontravenata	Sp. nov	Valid	Vršanský	Late Jurassic (Kimmeridgian)	Karabastau Formation	Kazakhstan	A member of the family Liberiblattinidae.	
Liberiblattina liberiblattina	Sp. nov	Valid	Vršanský	Late Jurassic (Kimmeridgian)	Karabastau Formation	Kazakhstan	A member of the family Liberiblattinidae.	
Liberiblattina luminanala	Sp. nov	Valid	Vršanský	Late Jurassic (Kimmeridgian)	Karabastau Formation	Kazakhstan	A member of the family Liberiblattinidae.	
Liberiblattina neniocom	Sp. nov	Valid	Vršanský	Late Jurassic (Kimmeridgian)	Karabastau Formation	Kazakhstan	A member of the family Liberiblattinidae.	
Liberiblattina oddajsami	Sp. nov	Valid	Vršanský	Late Jurassic (Kimmeridgian)	Karabastau Formation	Kazakhstan	A member of the family Liberiblattinidae.	
Liberiblattina paleontologica	Sp. nov	Valid	Vršanský	Late Jurassic (Kimmeridgian)	Karabastau Formation	Kazakhstan	A member of the family Liberiblattinidae.	
Liberiblattina zokamuvypadli	Sp. nov	Valid	Vršanský	Late Jurassic (Kimmeridgian)	Karabastau Formation	Kazakhstan	A member of the family Liberiblattinidae.	
Lovec	Fam. et gen. et sp. nov	Valid	Vršanský	Late Jurassic (Kimmeridgian)	Karabastau Formation	Kazakhstan	A member of Mantodea; the type genus of the new family Lovecidae. The type species is L. pratiena.	
Macaroblattula velipsespilev	Sp. nov	Valid	Vršanský	Late Jurassic (Kimmeridgian)	Karabastau Formation	Kazakhstan	A member of the family Blattulidae.	
Maculosala	Gen. et sp. nov		Xia, Sendi & Luo in Xia et al.	Cretaceous	Burmese amber	Myanmar	A cockroach belonging to the family Corydiidae. The type species is M. circularis.	
Makacka	Gen. et 2 sp. nov	Valid	Vršanský	Late Jurassic (Kimmeridgian)	Karabastau Formation	Kazakhstan	A member of the family Liberiblattinidae. The type species is M. akcakam; genus also includes M. akmacaka.	
Maloval	Gen. et sp. nov	Valid	Vršanský	Late Jurassic (Kimmeridgian)	Karabastau Formation	Kazakhstan	A member of the family Umenocoleidae. The type species is M. hlavolam.	
Manipulator olim	Sp. nov	Valid	Vršanský	Late Jurassic (Kimmeridgian)	Karabastau Formation	Kazakhstan		
Mastotermes reticulatus	Sp. nov	Valid	Jiang, Zhao & Ren in Jiang et al.	Late Cretaceous (Cenomanian)	Burmese amber	Myanmar	A termite, a species of Mastotermes.	
Memento	Gen. et sp. nov	Valid	Vršanský	Late Jurassic (Kimmeridgian)	Karabastau Formation	Kazakhstan	A member of the family Caloblattinidae. The type species is M. mori.	
Mesoblattina etarakan	Sp. nov	Valid	Vršanský	Late Jurassic (Kimmeridgian)	Karabastau Formation	Kazakhstan	A member of the family Mesoblattinidae.	
Mesoblattina khetanensis	Sp. nov	Valid	Vršanský et Kováčová in Vršanský et al.	Late Cretaceous (Turonian)	Emanra Formation	Russia (Khabarovsk Krai)	A member of the family Mesoblattinidae.	
Miniblattina inflatica	Sp. nov	Valid	Vršanský	Late Jurassic (Kimmeridgian)	Karabastau Formation	Kazakhstan	A member of the family Liberiblattinidae.	
Morphna una	Sp. nov	Valid	Vršanský	Late Jurassic (Kimmeridgian)	Karabastau Formation	Kazakhstan	A member of the family Blaberidae.	
Nigropterix cummingi	Sp. nov	Valid	Sendi	Cretaceous	Burmese amber	Myanmar	A member of the family Umenocoleidae.	
Okienkula	Gen. et sp. nov	Valid	Vršanský	Late Jurassic (Kimmeridgian)	Karabastau Formation	Kazakhstan	A member of the family Blattulidae. The type species is O. ojedinela.	
Okruhliak	Gen. et sp. nov	Junior homonym	Vršanský	Late Jurassic (Kimmeridgian) to Cretaceous	Karabastau Formation	Kazakhstan; Myanmar	A member of the family Corydiidae belonging to the subfamily Latindiinae. The type species is O. samoodpovedaniesi; genus also includes an unnamed species from the Cretaceous amber from Myanmar. The generic name is preoccupied by Okruhliak Vršanský & Hinkelman in Vršanský et al. (2022). Xia et al. (2024) treat O. samoodpovedaniesi as the second species of the genus named by Vršanský & Hinkelman.	
Olzmasg	Gen. et sp. nov	Valid	Vršanský	Late Jurassic (Kimmeridgian)	Karabastau Formation	Kazakhstan	A member of the family Raphidiomimidae. The type species is O. zi.	
Operam	Fam. et gen. et 3 sp. nov	Valid	Vršanský	Late Jurassic (Kimmeridgian)	Karabastau Formation	Kazakhstan	A cockroach, the type genus of the new family Operamidae. The type species is O. testudina; genus also includes O. monita and O. simpla.	
Perlucipecta liangiae	Sp. nov	Valid	Vršanský	Late Jurassic (Kimmeridgian)	Karabastau Formation	Kazakhstan	A member of the family Mesoblattinidae.	
Perspicuus csincsii	Sp. nov	Valid	Szabó, Sendi & Ősi	Late Cretaceous (Santonian)	Ajka Coal Formation	Hungary	A member of the family Umenocoleidae belonging to the subfamily Vitisminae.	
Petropterix koreaensis	Sp. nov		Lee et al.	Early Cretaceous (Albian)	Jinju Formation	South Korea	A member of the family Umenocoleidae.	
Praeblattella borealis	Sp. nov	Valid	Vršanský et Kováčová in Vršanský et al.	Late Cretaceous	Timmerdiakh Formation	Russia (Sakha Republic)	A member of the family Mesoblattinidae.	
Praeblattella continuosa	Sp. nov	Valid	Šmídová, Bruthansová & Hain	Late Cretaceous (Cenomanian)	Burmese amber	Myanmar	A member of the family Mesoblattinidae.	
Praeblattella patrickmuelleri	Sp. nov	Valid	Šmídová, Bruthansová & Hain	Late Cretaceous (Cenomanian)	Burmese amber	Myanmar	A cockroach.	
Pseudoblattapterix	Gen. et sp. nov		Lee et al.	Early Cretaceous (Albian)	Jinju Formation	South Korea	A member of the family Umenocoleidae. Genus includes new species P. weoni.	
Rhipidoblatta hranapad	Sp. nov	Valid	Vršanský et Kováčová in Vršanský et al.	Late Cretaceous (Cenomanian-Turonian)	Arkagala Formation	Russia (Magadan Oblast)	A member of the family Caloblattinidae.	
Rhipidoblatta krug	Sp. nov	Valid	Vršanský et Kováčová in Vršanský et al.	Late Cretaceous (Turonian)	Emanra Formation	Russia (Khabarovsk Krai)	A member of the family Caloblattinidae.	
Rhipidoblatta matrikarky	Sp. nov	Valid	Vršanský	Late Jurassic (Kimmeridgian)	Karabastau Formation	Kazakhstan	A member of the family Caloblattinidae.	
Rhipidoblatta matriky	Sp. nov	Valid	Vršanský	Late Jurassic (Kimmeridgian)	Karabastau Formation	Kazakhstan	A member of the family Caloblattinidae.	
Rhipidoblatta srdiecko	Sp. nov	Valid	Vršanský et Kováčová in Vršanský et al.	Late Cretaceous (probably Santonian)	Emuneret Formation	Russia (Chukotka Autonomous Okrug)	A member of the family Caloblattinidae.	
Rhipidoblatta trika	Sp. nov	Valid	Vršanský	Late Jurassic (Kimmeridgian)	Karabastau Formation	Kazakhstan	A member of the family Caloblattinidae.	
Rhipidoblatta triky	Sp. nov	Valid	Vršanský	Late Jurassic (Kimmeridgian)	Karabastau Formation	Kazakhstan	A member of the family Caloblattinidae.	
Rhipidoblatta trimestre	Sp. nov	Valid	Vršanský	Late Jurassic (Kimmeridgian)	Karabastau Formation	Kazakhstan	A member of the family Caloblattinidae.	
Rhipidoblattina dmitrievi	Sp. nov	Valid	Vršanský	Late Jurassic (Kimmeridgian)	Karabastau Formation	Kazakhstan	A member of the family Raphidiomimidae.	
Rhipidoblattina suspendissa	Sp. nov	Valid	Vršanský et Kováčová in Vršanský et al.	Late Cretaceous (Turonian)	Emanra Formation	Russia (Khabarovsk Krai)	A member of the family Raphidiomimidae.	
Sivis lukashevichiae	Sp. nov	Valid	Vršanský	Late Jurassic (Kimmeridgian)	Karabastau Formation	Kazakhstan	A member of the family Mesoblattinidae.	
Sociala borat	Sp. nov	Valid	Vršanský	Late Jurassic (Kimmeridgian)	Karabastau Formation	Kazakhstan		
Spono	Gen. et sp. nov	Valid	Vršanský	Late Jurassic (Kimmeridgian)	Karabastau Formation	Kazakhstan	A member of the family Blattulidae. The type species is S. spono.	
Stictolampra ochotensis	Sp. nov	Valid	Vršanský, Vidlička & Kováčová in Vršanský et al.	Late Cretaceous (Turonian)	Emanra Formation	Russia (Khabarovsk Krai)	A member of the family Blaberidae.	
Temnopteryx electrokosmi	Sp. nov	Valid	Vršanský et al.	Eocene	Baltic amber	Russia (Kaliningrad Oblast)	A species of Temnopteryx.	
Tyrannotermes	Gen. et sp. nov	Valid	Engel & Jouault	Late Cretaceous (Cenomanian)	Burmese amber	Myanmar	A termite belonging to the family Hodotermopsidae. The type species is T. spinifer.	
Umenocoleus minimus	Sp. nov		Lee et al.	Early Cretaceous (Albian)	Jinju Formation	South Korea	A member of the family Umenocoleidae.	
Vitisma coriacea	Sp. nov	Valid	Sendi	Cretaceous	Burmese amber	Myanmar	A member of the subfamily Vitisminae.	
Vrtula exploratoremvalidator	Sp. nov	Valid	Vršanský & Sendi	Cretaceous	Burmese amber	Myanmar	A member of the family Blattulidae.	
Vrtula tsaganica	Comb. nov	Valid	(Vršanský)	Early Cretaceous	Dzun-Bain Formation	Mongolia	A member of the family Blattulidae. Moved from Ctenoblattina tsaganica Vršanský (1999).	

=== Dictyopteran research ===
- Naugolnykh (2024) reports evidence indicating that wings of the blattoid insect Sogdoblatta from the Triassic Madygen Formation (Kyrgyzstan) had the same venation pattern as plants with the pinnate foliages from the same formation, especially members of the genus Cladophlebis, and interprets this finding as likely evidence of mimicry.
- Evidence from the study of extant cockroaches, interpreted as indicating that fossil cockroaches cannot be universally classified on the basis of forewing characters, is presented by Li (2024), who considers the families Blattulidae, Caloblattinidae and Mesoblattinidae to be nomina dubia.
- McLoughlin et al. (2024) describe opalized casts of fecal pellets from the Cretaceous Griman Creek Formation, interpreted as the oldest evidence of the presence of termites in Australia reported to date.
- Mizumoto et al. (2024) describe a Baltic amber inclusion from the Yantarny mine (Kaliningrad Oblast, Russia) preserving a female–male pair of the termite species Electrotermes affinis, interpreted as a likely tandem running pair.

== Hymenopterans ==
=== "Symphyta" ===
Name	Novelty	Status	Authors	Age	Type locality	Country	Notes	Images
Aduantoma	Gen. et sp. nov	Valid	Sun, Rasnitsyn, Zhuang & Shih in Sun et al.	Middle Jurassic		China	A member of the family Blasticotomidae. The type species is A. insolita.	
Apertoma	Gen. et comb. nov	Valid	Sun, Rasnitsyn, Zhuang & Shih in Sun et al.	Middle Jurassic	Jiulongshan Formation	China	A member of the family Blasticotomidae; a new genus for "Xyelotoma" macroclada Gao, Ren & Shih (2009).	
Baladi	Gen. et sp. nov	Valid	Rodriguez, Frese & Macdonald in Rodriguez et al.	Miocene	McGraths Flat Lagerstätte	Australia	A member of the family Pergidae. The type species is B. warru.	
Enspeletoma	Gen. et sp. nov	Valid	Rasnitsyn & Wedmann in Sun et al.	Oligocene		Germany	A member of the family Blasticotomidae. The type species is E. oligocaenica.	
Eodiprion pectinatus	Sp. nov	Valid	Vilhelmsen in Vilhelmsen, Perkovsky & Jenkins Shaw	Eocene	Baltic amber	Poland	A member of the family Diprionidae.	
Eosyntexis conflata	Sp. nov	Valid	Li, Wang, Rasnitsyn & Shih in Li et al.	Early Cretaceous (Barremian–Aptian)	Yixian Formation	China	A member of the family Anaxyelidae.	
Ghilarella elegantula	Sp. nov		Li et al.	Early Cretaceous	Yixian Formation	China	A member of the family Sepulcidae.	
Ghilarella kopylovi	Sp. nov		Li et al.	Early Cretaceous		Russia (Buryatia)	A member of the family Sepulcidae.	
Hemisyntexis	Gen. et sp. nov	Valid	Li, Wang, Rasnitsyn & Shih in Li et al.	Early Cretaceous (Barremian–Aptian)	Yixian Formation	China	A member of the family Anaxyelidae. The type species is H. lepida.	
Hervetia	Gen. et sp. nov		Nel & Kundura	Paleocene		France	A member of the family Cimbicidae. The type species is H. paleocenica.	
Kryptovelona	Gen. et sp. nov		Vilhelmsen et al.	Eocene	Baltic amber	Europe (Baltic Sea region)	A member of the family Orussidae. The type species is K. carstengroehni.	
Liberitoma	Gen. et 3 sp. nov	Valid	Sun, Rasnitsyn, Zhuang & Shih in Sun et al.	Middle Jurassic		China	A member of the family Blasticotomidae. The type species is L. tenella; genus also includes L. compta and L. incompleta.	
Luberotenthredo	Gen. et sp. nov	Valid	Nel et al.	Oligocene	"Calcaire de Campagne-Calavon" Formation	France	A member of the family Tenthredinidae. The type species is L. cerestensis.	
Magnicapitixyela	Gen. et sp. nov	Valid	Montagna & Magoga in Montagna et al.	Middle Triassic (Ladinian)	Meride Limestone Formation	Switzerland	A member of the family Xyelidae. The type species is M. dilettae.	
Monodiprion	Gen. et sp. nov	Valid	Vilhelmsen in Vilhelmsen, Perkovsky & Jenkins Shaw	Eocene	Baltic amber	Europe (Baltic Sea region)	A member of the family Diprionidae. The type species is M. gladius.	
Orussus juttagroehnae	Sp. nov		Vilhelmsen et al.	Eocene	Baltic amber	Europe (Baltic Sea region)	A species of Orussus.	
Palaeocaiina	Gen. et sp. nov	Valid	Nel et al.	Paleocene		France	A member of the family Tenthredinidae. The type species is P. menatensis.	
Rovnotaxonus	Gen. et sp. nov	Valid	Vilhelmsen & Perkovsky in Vilhelmsen, Perkovsky & Jenkins Shaw	Eocene	Rovno amber	Ukraine	A member of the family Tenthredinidae. The type species is R. aristovi.	
Xeris muratensis	Sp. nov	Valid	Boderau et al.	Miocene	Sainte-Reine Laggerstätte	France	A species of Xeris.	
Xyelocerus abruptus	Sp. nov	Valid	Sun, Rasnitsyn, Zhuang & Shih in Sun et al.	Middle Jurassic		China	A member of the family Blasticotomidae.	
Yananphilius	Gen. et sp. nov	Valid	Jouault	Middle Jurassic	Yanan Formation	China	A member of the family Sepulcidae. The type species is Y. peizhuangensis.	

=== Apocrita ===
==== Apoidea ====
Name	Novelty	Status	Authors	Age	Type locality	Country	Notes	Images
Aspidosmiella	Gen. et comb. nov	Valid	Engel in Engel & Xie	Eocene	Baltic amber	Europe (Baltic Sea region)	A bee belonging to the subfamily Megachilinae and the tribe Ctenoplectrellini. The type species is "Ctenoplectrella" phaeton Gonzalez & Engel (2011).	
Cretosphecium jinjuensis	Sp. nov	Valid	Jouault, Kwon & Nam	Early Cretaceous (Albian)	Jinju Formation	South Korea	A member of the family Angarosphecidae.	
Glyptosmia	Gen. et sp. nov	Valid	Engel in Engel & Xie	Eocene	Guchengzi Formation (Fushun amber)	China	A bee belonging to the subfamily Megachilinae and the tribe Glyptosmiini. The type species is G. hemiaspis.	
Halictus archaeocephalus	Sp. nov	Valid	Engel	Miocene		Germany	A species of Halictus.	
Halictus? messinicus	Sp. nov	Valid	Engel & Nel	Miocene (Messinian)	Sainte-Reine Lagerstätte	France	Possibly a species of Halictus.	
Lasioglossum (Dialictus) muratense	Sp. nov	Valid	Engel & Nel	Miocene (Messinian)	Sainte-Reine Lagerstätte	France	A species of Lasioglossum.	
Rhapidogyna	Gen. et 3 sp. nov	Valid	Rosa & Melo	Late Cretaceous (Cenomanian)	Burmese amber	Myanmar	A member of Apoidea belonging to the family Temnogynidae. The type species is R. festiva; genus also includes R. elongata and R. prima. Its original generic name Rhabdogyna was preoccupied by Rhabdogyna Millidge (1985), necessitating creation of the replacement name Rhapidogyna.	
Temnogyna	Fam. et gen. et 3 sp. nov	Valid	Rosa & Melo	Late Cretaceous (Cenomanian)	Burmese amber	Myanmar	A member of Apoidea, the type genus of the new family Temnogynidae. The type species is T. elegans; genus also includes T. multiplex and T. nyx.	
Thyreomelikertes	Gen. et 2 sp. nov	Valid	Engel in Engel & Xie	Eocene	Guchengzi Formation (Fushun amber)	China	A bee belonging to the subfamily Apinae and the tribe Melikertini. The type species is T. electrosinicus; genus also includes T. kongi.	
Xylocopa (Apocolyx) primigenia	Sp. nov	Valid	Engel & Wappler in Geier et al.	Eocene	Messel pit	Germany	A carpenter bee.	

==== Chrysidoidea ====
Name	Novelty	Status	Authors	Age	Type locality	Country	Notes	Images
Atoposega rosai	Comb. nov		(Brazidec & Perrichot)	Miocene	Zhangpu amber	China	A cuckoo wasp belonging to the subfamily Amiseginae; moved from Hedychridium rosai Brazidec & Perrichot.	
Hukawngepyris	Gen. et sp. nov	Valid	Brazidec, Lohrmann & Perrichot	Cretaceous (Albian–Cenomanian)	Burmese amber	Myanmar	A member of the family Bethylidae belonging to the subfamily Epyrinae. The type species is H. setosus.	
Primeuchroeus groehni	Sp. nov		Brazidec, Rosa & Perrichot	Eocene	Baltic amber	Europe (Baltic Sea region)	A species of Primeuchroeus.	
Thaumatorrhinos	Gen. et sp. nov	Valid	Martins & Melo	Cretaceous	Burmese amber	Myanmar	A member of the family Dryinidae belonging to the subfamily Thaumatodryininae. The type species is T. athrix.	

===== Chrysidoidea research =====
- Paulsen, Olmi & Stilwell (2024) report the discovery of a probable member of the genus Ampulicomorpha from the Eocene Anglesea amber (Australia), extending known distribution of fossil members of the family Embolemidae into southern high latitudes.

==== Diaprioidea ====
Name	Novelty	Status	Authors	Age	Type locality	Country	Notes	Images
Ambositra bicarinata	Sp. nov	Valid	Chemyreva in Chemyreva, Vasilenko & Perkovsky	Eocene	Rovno amber	Ukraine	A member of the family Diapriidae belonging to the subfamily Ambositrinae.	
Ambositra epicnemia	Sp. nov	Valid	Chemyreva in Chemyreva, Vasilenko & Perkovsky	Eocene	Rovno amber	Ukraine	A member of the family Diapriidae belonging to the subfamily Ambositrinae.	
Ambositra masneri	Sp. nov	Valid	Chemyreva in Chemyreva, Vasilenko & Perkovsky	Eocene	Rovno amber	Ukraine	A member of the family Diapriidae belonging to the subfamily Ambositrinae.	
Ambositra villumi	Comb. nov	Valid	(Brazidec & Vilhelmsen)	Eocene	Baltic amber	Europe (Baltic Sea region)	A member of the family Diapriidae belonging to the subfamily Ambositrinae; moved from Basalys villumi Brazidec & Vilhelmsen (2022).	
Arcanys	Gen. et sp. nov	Valid	Chemyreva in Chemyreva, Legalov & Perkovsky	Eocene	Rovno	Ukraine	A member of the family Diapriidae belonging to the subfamily Ambositrinae. The type species is A. rostratus.	
Lubomirus	Gen. et 2 sp. nov	Valid	Chemyreva, Perkovsky & Vasilenko	Eocene	Baltic amber	Russia (Kaliningrad Oblast)	A member of the family Ismaridae. The type species is L. victori from the Baltic amber; genus also includes L. masneri from the Rovno amber.	

==== Evanioidea ====
Name	Novelty	Status	Authors	Age	Type locality	Country	Notes	Images
Azygdellitha	Gen. et sp. nov	Valid	Yang et al.	Late Cretaceous (Cenomanian)	Burmese amber	Myanmar	A member of the family Praeaulacidae belonging to the subfamily Praeaulacinae. The type species is A. nova.	
Habraulacus splendidus	Sp. nov	Valid	Jouault & Huang	Cretaceous (Albian to Cenomanian)	Burmese amber	Myanmar	A member of the family Praeaulacidae.	
Hadraulacus liae	Sp. nov	Valid	Jouault & Huang	Cretaceous (Albian-Cenomanian)	Burmese amber	Myanmar	A member of the family Praeaulacidae.	
Manlaya minima	Sp. nov	Valid	Álvarez-Parra & Huang	Early Cretaceous (Barremian to Aptian)	Shouchang Formation	China	A member of the family Baissidae.	
Praegastrinus	Gen. et sp. nov		Jouault & Nel	Cretaceous	Burmese amber	Myanmar	A member of the family Praeaulacidae belonging to the subfamily Praeaulacinae. The type species is P. edithae.	
Sinuevania pouilloni	Sp. nov		Jouault & Nel	Cretaceous	Burmese amber	Myanmar	A member of the family Evaniidae.	
Tichostephanus kachinensis	Sp. nov		Wang et al.	Cretaceous	Burmese amber	Myanmar		
Tichostephanus longus	Sp. nov		Wang et al.	Cretaceous	Burmese amber	Myanmar		

==== Formicoidea ====
Name	Novelty	Status	Authors	Age	Type locality	Country	Notes	Images
Antiquiformica	Gen. et sp. nov	Valid	Wu, Radchenko & Engel in Wu et al.	Late Cretaceous (Cenomanian)	Burmese amber	Myanmar	An ant belonging to the subfamily Formicinae. The type species is A. alata.	
Aphaenogaster groehni	Sp. nov	Valid	Radchenko in Radchenko, Gröhn & Ribbecke	Eocene	Baltic amber	Poland	A species of Aphaenogaster.	
Aphaenogaster ribbeckei	Sp. nov	Valid	Radchenko in Radchenko, Gröhn & Ribbecke	Eocene	Baltic amber	Poland	A species of Aphaenogaster.	
Baikuris ocellantis	Sp. nov	Valid	Sosiak et al.	Late Cretaceous (Campanian)	North Carolina amber	United States (North Carolina)	A species of Baikuris.	
Brownimecia inconspicua	Sp. nov	Valid	Sosiak et al.	Late Cretaceous (Campanian)	North Carolina amber	United States (North Carolina)	A species of Brownimecia.	
Camponotites ambon	Comb. nov	Valid	(Zhang)	Miocene (Burdigalian)	Shanwang Formation	China	An ant belonging to the subfamily Formicinae; moved from Camponotus ambon Zhang (1989).	
Camponotites ampullosus	Comb. nov	Valid	(Zhang)	Miocene (Burdigalian)	Shanwang Formation	China	A Formicinae subfamily ant. moved from Camponotus ampullosus Zhang (1989).	
Camponotites cockerelli	Comb. nov	Valid	(Donisthorpe)	Eocene (Priabonian)	Bouldnor Formation	United Kingdom	A Formicinae subfamily ant. moved from Leucotaphus cockerelli Donisthorpe (1920).	
Camponotites compactus	Comb. nov	Valid	(Förster)	Oligocene		France	A Formicinae subfamily ant. moved from Camponotus compactus Förster (1891).	
Camponotites crozei	Comb. nov	Valid	(Riou)	Miocene (Turolian)		France	A Formicinae subfamily ant. moved from Camponotus crozei Riou (1999).	
Camponotites curviansatus	Comb. nov	Valid	(Zhang)	Miocene (Burdigalian)	Shanwang Formation	China	A Formicinae subfamily ant. moved from Camponotus curviansatus Zhang (1989).	
Camponotites fuscipennis	Comb. nov	Valid	(Carpenter)	Eocene	Florissant Formation	United States (Colorado)	A Formicinae subfamily ant. moved from Camponotus fuscipennis Carpenter (1930).	
Camponotites gracilis	Comb. nov	Valid	(Zhang)	Miocene (Burdigalian)	Shanwang Formation	China	A Formicinae subfamily ant. moved from Camponotus gracilis Zhang (1989).	
Camponotites heracleus	Comb. nov	Valid	(Heer)	Miocene		Croatia	A Formicinae subfamily ant. moved from Formica heraclea Heer (1849).	
Camponotites induratus	Comb. nov	Valid	(Heer)	Miocene		Croatia	A Formicinae subfamily ant. moved from Formica indurate Heer (1849).	
Camponotites lignitus	Comb. nov	Valid	(Germar)	Oligocene	Rott Formation	Germany	A Formicinae subfamily ant. moved from Formica lignitum Germar (1837).	
Camponotites longiventris	Comb. nov	Valid	(Théobald)	Oligocene (Chattian)	Niveau du gypse d'Aix Formation	France	A Formicinae subfamily ant. moved from Camponotus longiventris Théobald (1937).	
Camponotites longus	Comb. nov	Valid	(Zhang)	Miocene (Burdigalian)	Shanwang Formation	China	A Formicinae subfamily ant. moved from Camponotus longus Zhang (1989).	
Camponotites microcephalus	Comb. nov	Valid	(Carpenter)	Eocene	Florissant Formation	United States (Colorado)	A Formicinae subfamily ant. moved from Camponotus microcephalus Carpenter (1930).	
Camponotites microthoracus	Comb. nov	Valid	(Zhang)	Miocene (Burdigalian)	Shanwang Formation	China	A Formicinae subfamily ant. moved from Camponotus microthoracus Zhang (1989).	
Camponotites novotnyi	Comb. nov	Valid	(Samšińák)	Oligocene (Rupelian)		Czech Republic	A Formicinae subfamily ant. moved from Camponotus novotnyi Samšińák (1967).	
Camponotites obesus	Comb. nov	Valid	(Piton)	Miocene		France	A Formicinae subfamily ant. moved from Camponotus obesus Piton (1935).	
Camponotites oeningensis	Comb. nov	Valid	(Heer)	Miocene		Croatia	A Formicinae subfamily ant. moved from Formica obesa oeningensis Heer (1849).	
Camponotites penninervis	Comb. nov	Valid	(Théobald)	Oligocene (Chattian)	Niveau du gypse d'Aix Formation	France	A Formicinae subfamily ant. moved from Camponotus penninervis Théobald (1937).	
Camponotites petrifactus	Comb. nov	Valid	(Carpenter)	Eocene	Florissant Formation	United States (Colorado)	A Formicinae subfamily ant. moved from Camponotus petrifactus Carpenter (1930).	
Camponotites pictus	Comb. nov	Junior homonym	(Zhang)	Miocene (Burdigalian)	Shanwang Formation	China	A Formicinae subfamily ant. moved from Camponotus pictus Zhang, Sun & Zhang (1994). Fisher (2025) found it to be preoccupied by Camponotus ligniperdus var. pictus Forel (1886), and coined a replacement name Camponotites flarex.	
Camponotites plenus	Comb. nov	Valid	(Zhang)	Miocene (Burdigalian)	Shanwang Formation	China	A Formicinae subfamily ant. moved from Camponotus plenus Zhang (1989).	
Camponotites shanwangensis	Comb. nov	Valid	(Hong)	Miocene (Burdigalian)	Shanwang Formation	China	A Formicinae subfamily ant. moved from Camponotus shanwangensis Hong (1984).	
Camponotites theobaldi	Comb. nov	Valid	(Özdikmen)	Oligocene (Chattian)	Niveau du gypse d'Aix Formation	France	A Formicinae subfamily ant. moved from Camponotus theobaldi Özdikmen (2010).	
Camponotites tokunagai	Comb. nov	Valid	(Naora)	Eocene (Lutetian)	Jijuntun Formation (Fushun amber)	China	A Formicinae subfamily ant. moved from Camponotus tokunagai Naora (1933).	
Camponotites ullrichi	Comb. nov		(Bachmayer)	Miocene (Messinian)		Austria	A Formicinae subfamily ant. moved from Camponotus ullrichi (1960). The holotype forewing was considered to be unidentifiable by Boudinot et al. (2024), who consider the taxon to be invalid.	
Camponotites vehemens	Comb. nov	Valid	(Förster)	Oligocene		France	A Formicinae subfamily ant. moved from Camponotus vehemens Förster (1891).	
Camponotites vetus	Comb. nov	Valid	(Scudder)	Eocene	Green River Formation?	United States (Colorado?)	A Formicinae subfamily ant. moved from Camponotus vetus (1877).	
Cataglyphoides komvos	Sp. nov	Valid	Radchenko & Khomych	Eocene	Rovno amber	Ukraine	A Formicinae subfamily ant.	
Cataglyphoides konikos	Sp. nov	Valid	Radchenko & Khomych	Eocene	Rovno amber	Ukraine	A Formicinae subfamily ant.	
Eocamponotus	Gen. et comb. nov	Valid	Boudinot in Boudinot et al.	Eocene	Baltic amber	Europe (Baltic Sea region)	An ant belonging to the tribe Camponotini. The type species is "Camponotus" mengei Mayr (1868).	
Elektroformica	Gen. et sp. nov	Valid	Varela-Hernández, Riquelme & Estrada-Ruiz	Oligocene-Miocene	Mexico amber	Mexico	A Formicinae subfamily ant. The type species is E. azquil.	
Eoecophylla	Gen. et sp. nov	Valid	Archibald, Mathewes & Perfilieva	Eocene	Coldwater Beds	Canada (British Columbia)	An Oecophyllini tribe ant. The type species is E. quilchenensis.	
Eotemnothorax	Gen. et comb. et 12 sp. nov	Valid	Radchenko	Eocene	Baltic amber	Germany; Poland; Ukraine	The type species is "Leptothorax" gracilis Mayr (1868); genus also includes "Macromischa" petiolata Mayr (1868), "Leptothorax" glaesarius Wheeler (1915), "Leptothorax" longaevus Wheeler (1915), "Leptothorax" hystriculus Wheeler (1915) and "Leptothorax" placivus Wheeler (1915), as well as new species E. armatum, E. balticus, E. foveocephalus, E. groehni, E. khomychi, E. odontos, E. pedunculatus, E. perkovskii, E. punctatus, E. rav, E. rectispinus and E. rhytidus.	
Incertogaster	Gen. et comb. nov	Valid	Boudinot in Boudinot et al.	Eocene (Priabonian)	Rovno amber	Ukraine	A Myrmicinae subfamily ant. The type species is Crematogaster primitiva (2019). Also includes Crematogaster aurora (2015) and Crematogaster praecursor (1891).	
Liometopum palaeopterum	Comb. nov	Valid	(Zhang)	Miocene (Burdigalian)	Shanwang Formation	China	A species of Liometopum; moved from Shanwangella palaeoptera Zhang (1989).	
Oecophylla kraussei	Comb. nov	Valid	(Dlussky & Rasnitsyn)	Eocene (Ypresian)	Eocene Okanagan Highlands; Klondike Mountain Formation	United States (Washington)	A weaver ant. Moved from Camponotites kraussei (1999). Considered an "unnecessary new combination" by Barry Bolton via AntWeb (2024)	
Pheidole chaan	Sp. nov		Varela-Hernández & Flores-Zapoteco	Miocene	Mexican amber	Mexico	A species of Pheidole.	
Pheidole praehistorica	Sp. nov	Valid	Varela-Hernández & Riquelme	Oligocene-Miocene transition	Simojovel Formation (Mexican amber)	Mexico	A species of Pheidole.	
Siinikaponera	Gen. et sp. nov		Varela-Hernández, Riquelme & Guerrero	Oligocene-Miocene	Mexican amber	Mexico	A ponerine ant. The type species is S. sulimata.	
Sphecomyrma nexa	Sp. nov	Valid	Sosiak et al.	Late Cretaceous (Campanian)	North Carolina amber	United States (North Carolina)	A species of Sphecomyrma.	

===== Formicoidea research =====
- A study on the diversity dynamics of ants throughout their evolutionary history is published by Jouault et al. (2024), who interpret their findings as indicating that extinction of stem ants was more likely caused by their specialized morphology rather than by competition with crown ants, as well as indicating that the radiation of the flowering plants acted as a buffer against extinction and a driver of diversification in ants.
- Taniguchi et al. (2024) study the microstructure and distribution of sensilla from the antennae of Gerontoformica gracilis, and find that G. gracilis already had sensilla used by extant ants for detecting alarm pheromones and for distinguishing nestmates from intruders, and was capable of social chemical communication through pheromones used by modern ants.
- Evidence of genomic data, interpreted as indicating that cultivation of fungi by ants originated after Cretaceous–Paleogene extinction event when the asteroid impact temporarily interrupted photosynthesis, is presented by Schultz et al. (2024).

==== Ichneumonoidea ====
Name	Novelty	Status	Authors	Age	Type locality	Country	Notes	Images
Banchus shiobaraensis	Sp. nov	Valid	Takahashi et al.	Pleistocene	Shiobara Group	Japan	A species of Banchus.	
Cantabriazyx	Gen. et sp. nov	Valid	Álvarez-Parra & Jouault in Álvarez-Parra, Jouault & Azar	Early Cretaceous (Albian)		Spain	A braconid wasp. The type species is C. perezdelafuentei.	
Centistoides (Palaeoides) magnioculus	Sp. nov	Valid	Belokobylskij in Belokobylskij, Vasilenko & Perkovsky	Eocene	Danish amber	Denmark	A Centistini Euphorinae braconid wasp.	Centistoides magnioculus
Clinocentrus tadkeshwarense	Comb. nov	Valid	(Ortega-Blanco & Engel in Ortega-Blanco, Singh & Engel)	Eocene (Ypresian)	Cambay amber	India	Moved from Trichelyon tadkeshwarense Ortega-Blanco & Engel in Ortega-Blanco, Singh & Engel (2012).	
Eubazus electrus	Sp. nov	Valid	Belokobylskij & Zaldívar-Riverón in Belokobylskij, Pankowski & Zaldívar-Riverón	Eocene	Baltic amber	Russia (Kaliningrad Oblast)	A species of Eubazus.	
Grana	Gen. et sp. nov	Valid	Viertler, Schwarz, Verheyde & Klopfstein in Viertler et al.	Eocene	Baltic amber	Russia (Kaliningrad Oblast)	A phygadeuontine ichneumon wasp. The type species is G. harveydenti.	
Lithoserix oublierus	Sp. nov	Valid	Viertler	Oligocene (Rupelian)	Calcaires de Campagne-Calavon	France	A Pimplinae ichneumon wasp.	Lithoserix oublieri
Oligoneurus eocenus	Sp. nov	Valid	Belokobylskij in Belokobylskij, Vasilenko & Perkovsky	Eocene	Danish amber	Denmark	An ichneutine braconid wasp.	
Osparvis	Gen. et sp. nov	Valid	Viertler, Schwarz, Verheyde & Klopfstein in Viertler et al.	Eocene	Baltic amber	Russia (Kaliningrad Oblast)	A possible phygadeuontine ichneumon wasp. The type species is O. aurorae.	
Palaeorhoptrocentrus tenuicornis	Sp. nov	Valid	Belokobylskij, Pankowski & Zaldívar-Riverón	Eocene	Baltic amber	Russia (Kaliningrad Oblast)	A doryctine braconid wasp.	
Properhyssalus	Gen. et sp. nov	Valid	Belokobylskij in Belokobylskij & Manukyan	Eocene	Prussian Formation (Baltic amber)	Russia (Kaliningrad Oblast)	A rhyssaline braconid wasp. The type species is P. czechowskii.	
Rasnichneumon gibbosus	Sp. nov	Valid	Kopylov & Jouault	Cretaceous	Burmese amber	Myanmar	A member of the family Ichneumonidae belonging to the subfamily Novichneumoninae.	
Rasnichneumon klopfsteinae	Sp. nov	Valid	Kopylov & Jouault	Cretaceous	Burmese amber	Myanmar	A member of the family Ichneumonidae belonging to the subfamily Novichneumoninae.	
Rasnichneumon nevergo	Sp. nov	Valid	Jouault & Huang	Cretaceous	Burmese amber	Myanmar	A member of the family Ichneumonidae belonging to the subfamily Novichneumoninae.	
Rhysipolis (Granulopolis) simutniki	Sp. nov	Valid	Belokobylskij in Belokobylskij & Manukyan	Eocene	Prussian Formation (Baltic amber)	Russia (Kaliningrad Oblast)	A rhysipoline braconid wasp.	
Taphaeus obscurus	Sp. nov	Valid	Belokobylskij & Zaldívar-Riverón in Belokobylskij, Pankowski & Zaldívar-Riverón	Eocene	Baltic amber	Russia (Kaliningrad Oblast)	A brachistine braconid wasp belonging to the tribe Diospilini.	
Twangste	Gen. et sp. nov	Valid	Manukyan	Eocene	Baltic amber	Russia (Kaliningrad Oblast)	A member of the family Ichneumonidae belonging to the subfamily Pimplinae. Genus includes new species T. belokobylskiji.	
Xorides? romeo	Sp. nov	Valid	Viertler & Klopfstein in Viertler et al.	Eocene	Baltic amber	Russia (Kaliningrad Oblast)	A xoridine ichneumon wasp.	

==== Megalyroidea ====
Name	Novelty	Status	Authors	Age	Type locality	Country	Notes	Images
Cretolyra	Gen. et 2 sp. nov	Valid	Brazidec et al.	Cretaceous (Albian-Cenomanian)	Burmese amber	Myanmar	A member of the family Megalyridae. The type species is C. noijebumensis; genus also includes C. shawi.	
Genkyhag	Gen. et sp. nov	Valid	Brazidec et al.	Cretaceous (Albian-Cenomanian)	Burmese amber	Myanmar	A member of the family Megalyridae. The type species is G. innebula.	
Kamyristi	Gen. et 2 sp. nov	Valid	Brazidec et al.	Cretaceous (Albian-Cenomanian to Santonian)	Taimyr amber	Russia (Krasnoyarsk Krai)	A member of the family Megalyridae. The type species is K. exfrigore; genus also includes K. yantardakhensis.	
Megacoxa	Gen. et 3 sp. nov	Valid	Brazidec et al.	Cretaceous (Albian-Cenomanian)	Burmese amber	Myanmar	A member of the family Megalyridae. The type species is M. janzeni; genus also includes M. chandrahrasa and M. synchrotron.	

==== Mymarommatoidea ====
Name	Novelty	Status	Authors	Age	Type locality	Country	Notes	Images
Archaeromma chisatoi	Sp. nov	Valid	Aiba & Inose	Late Cretaceous (Coniacian)	Iwaki amber	Japan	A member of the family Mymarommatidae.	
Archaeromma phoenicium	Sp. nov	Valid	Álvarez-Parra, Rasnitsyn & Azar	Early Cretaceous (Barremian)	Lebanese amber	Lebanon	A member of the family Mymarommatidae.	

==== Panguoidea ====
Name	Novelty	Status	Authors	Age	Type locality	Country	Notes	Images
Protopangu	Gen. et sp. nov		Zhuang et al.	Early Cretaceous (Barremian)	Wealden amber	United Kingdom	A member of the family Panguidae. The type species of P. valdensis.	

==== Pompiloidea ====
Name	Novelty	Status	Authors	Age	Type locality	Country	Notes	Images
Burmusculus abstrusus	Sp. nov	Valid	Wu et al.	Cretaceous	Burmese amber	Myanmar	A member of the family Burmusculidae.	
Burmusculus primitivus	Sp. nov	Valid	Wu et al.	Cretaceous	Burmese amber	Myanmar	A member of the family Burmusculidae.	

==== Tiphioidea ====
Name	Novelty	Status	Authors	Age	Type locality	Country	Notes	Images
Orisolemorpha	Gen. et sp. nov		Álvarez-Parra & Engel in Álvarez-Parra et al.	Early Cretaceous (Albian)		Spain	A member of the family Sierolomorphidae. The type species is O. dyscheres.	

==== Vespoidea ====
Name	Novelty	Status	Authors	Age	Type locality	Country	Notes	Images
Falsiformix	Gen. et sp. nov		Zhang & Rasnitsyn in Zhang et al.	Cretaceous	Burmese amber	Myanmar	A member of the family Falsiformicidae. The type species is F. pedestris.	
Oligoropalidia	Gen. et sp. nov	Valid	Engel, Nguyen & Nel	Oligocene		France	A member of the family Vespidae belonging to the subfamily Polistinae and the tribe Ropalidiini. Genus includes new species O. aquaesexitae.	
Vespa (Intervespa) tortonica	Sp. nov	Valid	Engel & Nel	Miocene (Tortonian)		France	A hornet.	

== Clade Neuropterida ==
=== Neuropterans ===
Name	Novelty	Status	Authors	Age	Type locality	Country	Notes	Images
Aggregataberotha paucipunctata	Sp. nov	Valid	Chen, Shi, Ren & Yang in Chen et al.	Late Cretaceous (Cenomanian)	Burmese amber	Myanmar	A member of the family Berothidae.	
Anaberotha	Gen. et sp. nov	Valid	Li, Li & Liu	Cretaceous	Burmese amber	Myanmar	A member of the family Berothidae. The type species is A. hui.	
Araripeneura asiatica	Sp. nov		Khramov & Nam	Early Cretaceous (Albian)	Jinju Formation	South Korea	A member of Myrmeleontoidea belonging to the family Araripeneuridae.	
Araripenymphes koreicus	Sp. nov		Khramov & Nam	Early Cretaceous (Albian)	Jinju Formation	South Korea	A member of Myrmeleontoidea belonging to the family Cratosmylidae.	
Archarhachiberotha	Gen. et sp. nov		Wang, Ren & Wang in Wang et al.	Middle Jurassic	Jiulongshan Formation	China	A member of the stem group of Mantispoidea. The type species is A. longitarsa.	
Chrysopa danielleae	Sp. nov	Valid	Heads	Miocene (Aquitanian)	La Quinta Formation (Mexican amber)	Mexico	A species of Chrysopa.	
Danoberotha	Gen. et sp. nov	Valid	Makarkin et al.	Eocene	Fur Formation	Denmark	A member of the family Berothidae. The type species is D. verkleijorum.	
Electrogramma	Gen. et sp. nov	Valid	Peng et al.	Cretaceous	Burmese amber	Myanmar	A member of the family Kalligrammatidae. The type species is E. transformatum.	
Electroxipheus	Gen. et sp. nov	Valid	Badano & Cerretti in Badano et al.	Late Cretaceous (Cenomanian)	Burmese amber	Myanmar	A member of the stem group of Mantispoidea. The type species is E. veneficus.	
Furochrysa	Gen. et sp. nov	Valid	Makarkin & Perkovsky	Eocene	Fur Formation	Denmark	A member of the family Chrysopidae belonging to the subfamily Nothochrysinae. The type species is F. alisae.	
Glaesoconis glaber	Sp. nov	Valid	Jouault & Engel	Cretaceous	Burmese amber	Myanmar	A member of the family Coniopterygidae.	
Isoscelipteron bertrandi	Sp. nov	Valid	Boderau, Ngo-Muller & Nel	Miocene		France	A member of the family Berothidae.	
Lasiogramma	Gen. et sp. nov	Valid	Peng et al.	Cretaceous	Burmese amber	Myanmar	A member of the family Kalligrammatidae. The type species is L. ooideum.	
Mantispidipterella curvis	Sp. nov		Chen et al.	Late Cretaceous	Burmese amber	Myanmar	A member of the family Dipteromantispidae.	
Megalomus? coloradensis	Sp. nov	Valid	Makarkin	Eocene	Green River Formation	United States (Colorado)	A member of the family Hemerobiidae.	
Mischemerobia	Gen. et sp. nov	Valid	Chen, Zhuo & Liu in Chen et al.	Cretaceous	Burmese amber	Myanmar	A member of the family Hemerobiidae. The type species is M. yumini.	
Myanmarosmylus	Gen. et sp. nov		Li et al.	Cretaceous	Burmese amber	Myanmar	A member of the family Osmylidae. The type species is M. wintertoni.	
Natator	Gen. et sp. nov	Preoccupied	Kong et al.	Middle Jurassic	Daohugou Beds	China	A lacewing larva. The type species is N. giganteus. The generic name is preoccupied by Natator McCulloch (1908); the replacement name Yongling was proposed by Kong et al. (2026).	
Neromantispa	Gen. et sp. nov	Valid	Hart et al.	Miocene		Australia	A member of the family Mantispidae. The type species is N. antiqua.	
Nuddsia simplex	Sp. nov		Li et al.	Cretaceous	Burmese amber	Myanmar	A member of the family Osmylidae.	
Pararchaeomegaloma	Gen. et sp. nov	Valid	Chen, Zhuo & Liu in Chen et al.	Cretaceous	Burmese amber	Myanmar	A member of the family Hemerobiidae. The type species is P. suzheni.	
Proneuronema damzeni	Sp. nov	Valid	Makarkin & Wedmann	Eocene	Rovno amber	Ukraine	A member of the family Hemerobiidae.	
Pseudonotherobius	Gen. et 2 sp. nov	Valid	Makarkin	Eocene	Green River Formation	United States (Colorado)	A Hemerobiidae brown lacewing. The type species is P. kohlsi. Another new species, P. fenestromaculatus Chen, Gao & Liu (2024) was subsequently described from the Eocene Baltic amber.	
Riekchotes	Gen. et sp. nov	Valid	Lambkin	Middle Triassic (Anisian)	Gayndah Formation	Australia	A member of the family Ithonidae. The type species is R. reticulatus.	
Sejunctaberotha	Gen. et 3 sp. nov	Valid	Chen, Shi, Ren & Yang in Chen et al.	Late Cretaceous (Cenomanian)	Burmese amber	Myanmar	A member of the family Berothidae. The type species is S. transversa; genus also includes S. sphaerica and S. tenuis.	
Tholimantispa	Gen. et sp. nov		Chen et al.	Late Cretaceous	Burmese amber	Myanmar	A member of the family Dipteromantispidae. The type species is T. zuoae.	

==== Neuropteran research ====
- Buchner et al. (2024) describe new lacewing larvae from the Cretaceous amber from Myanmar, demonstrating the presence of trumpet-shaped elongate empodia in members of the families Nymphidae and Osmylidae, and argue that the empodium evolved only once in Neuroptera as was subsequently lost by several neuropteran lineages.
- A probable long-necked antlion larva with dark stripes on its legs possibly representing disruptive coloration is described from the Cretaceous amber from Myanmar by Haug, Haug & Haug (2024).
- A study on the evolution of the raptorial forelegs of members of Mantispoidea, based on data from extant and fossil taxa, is published by Li et al. (2024).
- A berothoid larva representing the first record of either the family Berothidae or the family Rhachiberothidae from the Eocene Rovno amber (Ukraine) reported to date is described by Makarkin & Perkovsky (2024).

=== Raphidiopterans ===
Name	Novelty	Status	Authors	Age	Type locality	Country	Notes	Images
Dracoraphidia	Gen. et sp. nov		Lu et al.	Cretaceous	Burmese amber	Myanmar	A member of the family Mesoraphidiidae. Genus includes new species D. brachystigma.	
Laiyangoraphidia	Gen. et sp. nov		Chen et al.	Early Cretaceous	Laiyang Formation	China	A member of the family Mesoraphidiidae. Genus includes new species L. delicata.	
Proraphidia anisomorpha	Sp. nov		Chen et al.	Early Cretaceous	Laiyang Formation	China	A member of the family Mesoraphidiidae.	
Teratocephala	Gen. et sp. nov		Lu et al.	Cretaceous	Burmese amber	Myanmar	A member of the family Mesoraphidiidae. Genus includes new species T. macrostigma.	

==== Raphidiopteran research ====
- Haug et al. (2024) describe a snakefly larva from the Cretaceous amber from Myanmar showing a mixture of characters from different developmental stages of extant and fossil snakeflies, and interpret this finding as indicating that metamorphosis was less pronounced in fossil snakeflies than in extant ones.

=== Other neuropteridans ===
Name	Novelty	Status	Authors	Age	Type locality	Country	Notes	Images
Merithone	Gen. et sp. nov	Valid	Montagna & Magoga in Montagna, Magoga & Magnani	Middle Triassic	Meride Limestone Formation	Switzerland	A member of the family Permithonidae. The type species is M. laetitiae.	

== Clade †Palaeodictyopteroidea ==
Name	Novelty	Status	Authors	Age	Type locality	Country	Notes	Images
Gallospilaptera	Gen. et sp. nov	Valid	Nel, Oudoire & Garrouste	Carboniferous			A spilapterid palaeodictyopteran. The type species is G. pectinata.	
Haseneura	Gen. et sp. nov	Valid	Rosová et al.	Carboniferous (Pennsylvanian)		Germany	A member of Eugereonoidea belonging to the family Archaemegaptilidae. The type species is H. jarmilae.	
Sinoelmoa	Gen. et sp. nov	Valid	Yang, Cui, Xu & Béthoux in Yang et al.	Permian (Asselian)	Shanxi Formation	China	A member of Diaphanopterodea belonging to the family Parelmoidae. The type species is S. yangquanensis.	
Spilaptera belgica	Sp. nov	Valid	Nel, Oudoire & Garrouste	Carboniferous			A spilapterid palaeodictyopteran.	

== Clade Palaeoptera ==
=== Ephemeropterans ===
Name	Novelty	Status	Authors	Age	Type locality	Country	Notes	Images
Alatuscapillus	Gen. et sp. nov	Valid	Mueller & Demers-Potvin	Late Cretaceous (Cenomanian)	Redmond Formation	Canada (Newfoundland and Labrador)	A member of the family Oligoneuriidae. The type species is A. icarus.	
Crephlebia	Gen. et sp. nov		Chen & Zheng	Cretaceous	Burmese amber	Myanmar	A mayfly belonging to the family Leptophlebiidae. The type species is C. zhoui.	
Cruscolli	Gen. et sp. nov	Valid	Mueller & Demers-Potvin	Late Cretaceous (Cenomanian)	Redmond Formation	Canada (Newfoundland and Labrador)	A member of the family Heptageniidae. The type species is C. sheppardae.	
Koonwarrabaetisca	Gen. et 2 sp. nov	Valid	Godunko & Sroka	Early Cretaceous (Aptian)	Koonwarra fossil bed	Australia	A mayfly belonging to the family Baetiscidae. The type species is K. jelli; genus also includes K. duncani.	
Protoligoneuria borealis	Sp. nov	Valid	Mueller & Demers-Potvin	Late Cretaceous (Cenomanian)	Redmond Formation	Canada (Newfoundland and Labrador)	A member of the family Hexagenitidae.	
Warungata	Gen. et sp. nov	Valid	Sroka & Prokop	Middle Triassic (Anisian)	Hawkesbury Sandstone	Australia	A mayfly of uncertain affinities. The type species is W. peterjelli.	

=== Odonatopterans ===
Name	Novelty	Status	Authors	Age	Type locality	Country	Notes	Images
Dysagrionites allenbyensis	Sp. nov	Valid	Archibald & Cannings	Eocene (Ypresian)	Allenby Formation	Canada (British Columbia)	A member or a relative of the family Dysagrionidae.	
Guocordulia	Nom. nov	Valid	Nel, Huang & Lian	Early Cretaceous (Barremian)	Yixian Formation	China	A dragonfly belonging to the group Cavilabiata and the family Mesocorduliidae; a replacement name for Mesocordulia Ren & Guo (1996).	
Gusagrion	Gen. et sp. nov	Valid	Nel	Eocene	Green River Formation	United States (Colorado)	An eodysagrionine damselfly. The type species is G. coloratum.	
Hongtaous	Gen. et sp. nov	Valid	Liu et al.	Middle Jurassic		China	A dragonfly belonging to the group Petaluroidea and the family Aktassiidae. The type species is H. caii.	
Issadoneura	Gen. et sp. nov	Valid	Felker	Permian		Russia	A protozygopteran belonging to the family Progoneuridae. The type species is I. marilevorum. Published online in 2024, but the issue date is listed as December 2023.	
Kachingomphides	Gen. et sp. nov		Liu et al.	Cretaceous	Burmese amber	Myanmar	A dragonfly belonging to the family Burmagomphidae. The type species is K. yujiai.	
Kennedya sylvensis	Sp. nov	Valid	Felker	Permian		Russia	A protozygopteran belonging to the family Kennedyidae. Published online in 2024, but the issue date is listed as December 2023.	
Kennedya volatica	Sp. nov	Valid	Felker	Permian		Russia	A protozygopteran belonging to the family Kennedyidae. Published online in 2024, but the issue date is listed as December 2023.	
Kidaneuthemis	Gen. et sp. nov	Valid	Liu, Ren & Yang in Liu et al.	Middle Jurassic (Callovian)	Jiulongshan Formation	China	A member of Isophlebioptera belonging to the family Euthemistidae. The type species is K. ningchengensis.	
Libanoaeshna	Fam. et gen. et sp. nov	Valid	Azar et al.	Late Cretaceous (Cenomanian)		Lebanon	A dragonfly, the type genus of the new family Libanoaeshnidae. The type species is L. mikhaeli.	
Lindenia heeri	Sp. nov	Valid	Boderau et al.	Miocene	Upper Freshwater-Molasse Formation	Germany	A dragonfly belonging to the family Gomphidae.	
Mesomegaloprepus liea	Sp. nov	Valid	Nel, Wang & Huang	Cretaceous (Albian-Cenomanian)	Burmese amber	Myanmar	A damselfly belonging to the family Mesomegaloprepidae.	
Mesosticta additicta	Sp. nov	Valid	Nel, Jouault & Huang	Cretaceous (Albian to Cenomanian)	Burmese amber	Myanmar	A member of the family Platystictidae.	
Neoaeschna	Gen. et sp. nov	Valid	Liu, Fang & Zheng	Cretaceous	Burmese amber	Myanmar	A dragonfly belonging to the family Burmaeshnidae. The type species is N. kachinensis.	
Paradysagrion	Gen. et sp. nov	Valid	Archibald & Cannings	Eocene (Ypresian)	Klondike Mountain Formation	United States (Washington)	A member or a relative of the family Dysagrionidae. The type species is P. sosbyae.	
Parahemeroscopus	Gen. et sp. nov	Valid	Qi et al.	Early Cretaceous	Zhonggou Formation	China	A dragonfly belonging to the family Hemeroscopidae. The type species is P. jiuquanensis.	
Permagrion sharovi	Sp. nov	Valid	Felker	Permian		Russia	A protozygopteran belonging to the family Permagrionidae. Published online in 2024, but the issue date is listed as December 2023.	
Permolestes obscurus	Sp. nov	Valid	Felker	Permian		Russia	A protozygopteran belonging to the family Permagrionidae. Published online in 2024, but the issue date is listed as December 2023.	
Permolestes vjatkensis	Sp. nov	Valid	Felker	Permian		Russia	A protozygopteran belonging to the family Permagrionidae. Published online in 2024, but the issue date is listed as December 2023.	
Permosticta	Gen. et 2 sp. nov	Valid	Felker	Permian		Russia	A protozygopteran belonging to the family Voltzialestidae. Genus includes new species P. elegans and P. parva. Published online in 2024, but the issue date is listed as December 2023.	
Petrolestes inexpectatus	Sp. nov	Valid	Nel	Eocene	Green River Formation	United States (Colorado)	A dysagrionid damselfly.	
Prototerskeja	Gen. et sp. nov	Valid	Felker	Permian		Russia	A protozygopteran belonging to the family Voltzialestidae. The type species is P. dubia. Published online in 2024, but the issue date is listed as December 2023.	
Salagoulestes martynovi	Sp. nov	Valid	Felker	Permian		Russia	A protozygopteran belonging to the family Permagrionidae. Published online in 2024, but the issue date is listed as December 2023.	
Sinagonophlebia	Gen. et sp. nov		Nel & Huang in Nel et al.	Middle Jurassic	Yanan Formation	China	A damsel-dragonfly belonging to the family Paragonophlebiidae. The type species is S. yananensis.	
Sinoerasipteron	Gen. et sp. nov	Valid	Nel & Huang in Nel et al.	Carboniferous (Moscovian)	Tupo Formation	China	A member of the family Erasipteridae. The type species is S. xiaheyanensis.	
Solikamptilon aequus	Sp. nov	Valid	Felker	Permian		Russia	A protozygopteran belonging to the family Permagrionidae. Published online in 2024, but the issue date is listed as December 2023.	
Stolleagrion	Gen. et sp. nov	Valid	Simonsen, Archibald & Ware in Simonsen et al.	Eocene (Ypresian)	Fur Formation	Denmark	A member of the family Dysagrionidae. The type species is S. foghnielseni.	
Sushkinia angulata	Sp. nov	Valid	Felker	Permian		Russia	A protozygopteran belonging to the family Permagrionidae. Published online in 2024, but the issue date is listed as December 2023.	
Treintamilun nuncamas	Sp. nov	Valid	Petrulevičius	Eocene	Laguna del Hunco Formation	Argentina	A member of Odonata belonging to the family Frenguelliidae.	
Triadolestes	Gen. et 2 sp. nov	Valid	Felker	Permian		Russia	A protozygopteran belonging to the family Permagrionidae. Genus includes new species T. sakmarensis and T. mutovkensis. Published online in 2024, but the issue date is listed as December 2023.	
Yananthemis	Gen. et sp. nov		Nel & Huang in Nel et al.	Middle Jurassic	Yanan Formation	China	A damsel-dragonfly belonging to the family Selenothemistidae. The type species is Y. zaoyuanensis.	

==== Odonatopteran research ====
- New oviposition lesion types, interpreted as evidence of presence of odonatans in Early Jurassic riparian ecosystems of northern Iran, are reported from cycadophyte leaves from the Shemshak Formation by Hashemi, Sadeghi & Wappler (2024).
- An aktassiid dragonfly of undetermined generic and specific placement, representing the youngest record of the family reported to date, is described from the Cenomanian amber from Myanmar by Fan et al. (2024).

== Clade †Paoliidea ==
=== †Paoliida ===
Name	Novelty	Status	Authors	Age	Type locality	Location	Notes	Images
Avionpaolia	Gen. et sp. nov	Valid	Boderau, Roques & Nel	Carboniferous (Moscovian)		France	A member of the family Paoliidae. The type species is A. amansfossilia.	

== Clade Paraneoptera ==
=== Hemipterans ===
==== Auchenorrhyncha ====
Name	Novelty	Status	Authors	Age	Type locality	Location	Notes	Images
Beaconiella tongchuanensis	Sp. nov	Valid	Zhang et al.	Middle Triassic (Ladinian)	Tongchuan Formation	China	A member of the family Curvicubitidae.	
Cretadorus leptosomus	Comb. nov		(Poinar & Brown)	Cretaceous	Burmese amber	Myanmar	A froghopper belonging to the family Sinoalidae. Moved from Araeoanasillus leptosomus Poinar & Brown (2023).	
Cretadorus qingyui	Sp. nov		Chen et al.	Late Cretaceous (Cenomanian)	Burmese amber	Myanmar	A froghopper belonging to the family Sinoalidae.	
Cretodorus lijuanae	Sp. nov	Valid	Liu & Jiang in Liu et al.	Cretaceous (Albian-Cenomanian)	Burmese amber	Myanmar	A planthopper belonging to the family Mimarachnidae.	
Cretotettigarcta problematica	Comb. nov	Valid	(Jiang et al.)	Cretaceous	Burmese amber	Myanmar	A stem cicadid; moved from Hpanraais problematicus Jiang et al.	
Cretotettigarcta shcherbakovi	Sp. nov	Valid	Jiang et al.	Cretaceous	Burmese amber	Myanmar	A stem cicadid.	
Eunotalia	Gen. et sp. nov	Valid	Jiang et al.	Cretaceous	Burmese amber	Myanmar	A stem cicadoid. The type species is E. emeryi.	
Eurymacropsis	Gen. et sp. nov	Valid	Dietrich & Wang	Cretaceous	Burmese amber	Myanmar	A leafhopper belonging to the subfamily Eurymelinae and probably to the tribe Macropsini. The type species is E. yanzhenae.	
Imbricatala	Gen. et sp. nov	Valid	Zhang et al.	Late Cretaceous (Cenomanian)	Burmese amber	Myanmar	A planthopper belonging to the family Inoderbidae. The type species is I. novitas.	
Kaltanetta gonfaronensis	Sp. nov		Boderau, Garrouste & Nel	Permian (Wordian)		France	A member of the family Prosbolidae.	
Libanissus	Gen. et sp. nov	Valid	Azar, Maksoud & Nel in Azar et al.	Early Cretaceous (Barremian)		Lebanon	A planthopper belonging to the family Issidae or Mimarachnidae. The type species is L. bkassinensis.	
Magnicercopis	Gen. et sp. nov	Valid	Zhang, Chen & Zhang in Zhang et al.	Early Jurassic	Sangonghe Formation	China	A member of the family Procercopidae. The type species is M. pingi. Published online in 2024, but the issue date is listed as December 2023.	
Mesonirvana dougsmithi	Sp. nov	Valid	Lambkin	Middle Triassic (Anisian)	Gayndah Formation	Australia	A member of Cicadomorpha belonging to the family Dysmorphoptilidae.	
Mesoscytina tongchuanensis	Sp. nov	Valid	Zhang, Du & Zhang in Zhang et al.	Middle Triassic (Ladinian)	Tongchuan Formation	China	A member of Cicadomorpha belonging to the family Scytinopteridae.	
Multistria fionae	Sp. nov	Valid	Fabrikant, Huang & Fu	Cretaceous	Burmese amber	Myanmar	A planthopper belonging to the family Mimarachnidae.	
Multistria irregularis	Sp. nov	Valid	Fabrikant, Huang & Fu	Cretaceous	Burmese amber	Myanmar	A planthopper belonging to the family Mimarachnidae.	
Multistria juanae	Sp. nov	Valid	Fabrikant, Huang & Fu	Cretaceous	Burmese amber	Myanmar	A planthopper belonging to the family Mimarachnidae.	
Niryasaburnia nigrutomia	Sp. nov	Valid	Deng & Bourgoin in Deng et al.	Late Cretaceous (Cenomanian)	Burmese amber	Myanmar	A planthopper belonging to the family Achilidae and the subfamily Myconinae.	
Ooscyta	Gen. et sp. nov	Valid	Shcherbakov	Permian (Changhsingian)	Akkolka Formation	Kazakhstan	A member of Cicadomorpha belonging to the family Scytinopteridae. The type species is O. chertoprudi.	
Pentacarinus maculosus	Sp. nov	Valid	Deng & Wang in Deng et al.	Late Cretaceous (Cenomanian)	Burmese amber	Myanmar	A planthopper belonging to the family Cixiidae.	
Pentacarinus tenebrosus	Sp. nov	Valid	Deng & Wang in Deng et al.	Late Cretaceous (Cenomanian)	Burmese amber	Myanmar	A planthopper belonging to the family Cixiidae.	
Pranwanna	Gen. et sp. nov	Valid	Jiang et al.	Cretaceous	Burmese amber	Myanmar	A stem cicadid. The type species is P. xiai.	
Sanmai? zetavena	Sp. nov	Valid	Jouault et al.	Late Triassic	Amisan Formation	South Korea	A member of the family Tettigarctidae.	
Scytinoptera minusculata	Sp. nov	Valid	Hakim & Fu	Middle Triassic	Yanchang Formation	China	A member of Cicadomorpha belonging to the family Scytinopteridae.	
Sinofulgoridium	Gen. et sp. nov		Zhang, Szwedo & Zhang in Zhang et al.	Middle Triassic (Ladinian)	Tongchuan Formation	China	A planthopper belonging to the family Surijokocixiidae. The type species is S. suni.	
Sinohylicella	Gen. et sp. nov	Valid	Fu, Nel & Boderau	Middle Triassic	Yanchang Formation	China	A member of Cicadomorpha belonging to the family Hylicellidae. The type species is S. sigmoidea.	
Sinuovenaxius	Gen. et sp. nov	Valid	Wang & Bourgoin in Deng et al.	Late Cretaceous (Cenomanian)	Burmese amber	Myanmar	A planthopper belonging to the family Achilidae and the subfamily Myconinae. The type species is S. kachinensis.	
Stellularis kazuoensis	Sp. nov		Zhang et al.	Early Cretaceous	Jiufotang Formation	China	A froghopper belonging to the family Procercopidae.	
Stylocentrus pouilloni	Sp. nov	Valid	Boderau & Nel	Miocene	Dominican amber	Dominican Republic	A treehopper, a species of Stylocentrus.	
Synelytra	Gen. et sp. nov	Valid	Shcherbakov	Early Triassic (Olenekian)	Petropavlovka Formation	Russia (Orenburg Oblast)	A member of Cicadomorpha belonging to the family Scytinopteridae. The type species is S. tverdokhlebovorum.	
Tomioscarta dominiquea	Sp. nov		Boderau, Garrouste & Nel	Permian (Wordian)		France	A member of Cicadomorpha belonging to the family Serpentivenidae.	
Triasalus	Gen. et sp. nov	Valid	Fabrikant et al.	Middle Triassic	Yanchang Formation	China	A member of Cicadomorpha with features of members of the families Hylicellidae and Archijassidae. The type species is T. chromatus.	
Triasomaguviopsis	Gen. et sp. nov	Valid	Zhang & Zhang in Zhang et al.	Triassic	Tanzhuang Formation	China	A member of Cicadomorpha belonging to the superfamily Prosboloidea and the family Maguviopseidae. The type species is T. jiyuanensis.	
Vulcanetoia	Nom. nov	Valid	Allsopp	Early Cretaceous	Santana Formation	Brazil	A planthopper belonging to the family Lalacidae; a replacement name for Vulcanoia Martins-Neto (1988).	

==== Coleorrhyncha ====
Name	Novelty	Status	Authors	Age	Type locality	Location	Notes	Images
Awanis	Gen. et sp. nov		You et al.	Cretaceous	Burmese amber	Myanmar	A member of the family Progonocimicidae belonging to the subfamily Cicadocorinae. The type species is A. clarus.	

==== Heteroptera ====
Name	Novelty	Status	Authors	Age	Type locality	Location	Notes	Images
Acutiangulus	Gen. et sp. nov	Valid	Zhang, Liu & Yao in Zhang et al.	Cretaceous	Burmese amber	Myanmar	A member of the family Reduviidae belonging to the subfamily Centrocnemidinae. The type species is A. densus.	
Arachnocoris furtivinabis	Sp. nov		Ma, Du & Yao in Ma et al.	Miocene	Dominican amber	Dominican Republic	A species of Arachnocoris.	
Archaeohebrus	Gen. et sp. nov	Valid	Zhang, Ren & Yao	Cretaceous	Burmese amber	Myanmar	A velvet water bug. The type species is A. alius.	
Burmogerris	Gen. et sp. nov	Valid	Fu, Cai, Chen & Huang in Fu et al.	Cretaceous (Albian-Cenomanian)	Burmese amber	Myanmar	A member of Gerroidea of uncertain affinities. The type species is B. rarus.	
Cativolcus	Gen. et sp. et comb. nov	Valid	Szwedo in Seyfullah et al.	Eocene (Ypresian)	Belgian amber	Belgium	A member of the family Miridae belonging to the subfamily Psallopinae. The type species is C. uebruum; genus also includes "Isometopsallops" prokopi Vernoux, Garrouste & Nel (2010) from the Lowermost Eocene French amber.	
Cratonerthra palaeophili	Sp. nov	Valid	Jarzembowski & Wang	Early Cretaceous	Weald Clay	United Kingdom	A member of the family Gelastocoridae.	
Cretamesovelia	Gen. et sp. nov		Boderau et al.	Cretaceous	Burmese amber	Myanmar	A member of the family Mesoveliidae. The type species is C. pellai.	
Ectrichodiella electrina	Sp. nov	Valid	Bush et al.	Miocene	Dominican amber	Dominican Republic	A member of the family Reduviidae belonging to the subfamily Ectrichodiinae.	
Enicocephalinus ibericus	Sp. nov	Valid	Davranoglou et al.	Early Cretaceous (Albian)	Ariño amber	Spain	A member of Enicocephalomorpha of uncertain affinities.	
Ferriantenna gracenuoxichenae	Sp. nov	Valid	Cumming, Le Tirant & Chen	Late Cretaceous (Cenomanian)	Burmese amber	Myanmar	A member of the family Coreidae.	
Jinjupopovina	Gen. et sp. nov		Sohn & Nam	Early Cretaceous	Jinju Formation	South Korea	A member of Coreoidea belonging to the family Yuripopovinidae. The type species is J. eosahwae.	
Koenigsbergia explicativa	Sp. nov	Valid	Ramirez et al.	Eocene	Baltic amber	Europe (Baltic Sea region)	A member of the family Reduviidae belonging to the subfamily Phimophorinae.	
Kuanzuia	Gen. et sp. nov		Chen & Zhuo	Cretaceous	Burmese amber	Myanmar	A member of the family Schizopteridae belonging to the subfamily Hypselosomatinae. The type species is K. cavanii.	
Libanobelostoma	Gen. et sp. nov	Valid	Boderau et al.	Late Cretaceous (Cenomanian)	Haqel Lagerstätte	Lebanon	A member of the family Belostomatidae. The type species is L. calineae.	
Mecocollaris	Gen. et sp. nov	Valid	Ma et al.	Cretaceous	Burmese amber	Myanmar	A member of the family Nabidae. The type species is M. simplipodus.	
Miropictopallium	Gen. et sp. nov	Valid	Fabrikant & Novoselska	Cretaceous (Albian-Cenomanian)	Burmese amber	Myanmar	A member of the family Yuripopovinidae. The type species is M. coloradmonens.	
Phimophorus chiodii	Sp. nov	Valid	Boderau et al.	Miocene	Dominican amber	Dominican Republic	A member of the family Reduviidae belonging to the subfamily Phimophorinae.	
Qiaoia	Gen. et sp. nov		Chen & Zhuo in Chen et al.	Cretaceous	Burmese amber	Myanmar	A member of the family Schizopteridae belonging to the family Hypselosomatinae. The type species is Q. menghaoae.	
Sauronaradus	Gen. et sp. nov	Valid	Cumming & Mlynarek	Cretaceous (Albian-Cenomanian)	Burmese amber	Myanmar	A member of the family Aradidae belonging to the subfamily Archearadinae. The type species is S. meganae.	
Tingiometra scutellbicostata	Sp. nov	Valid	Mu et al.	Cretaceous	Burmese amber	Myanmar	A member of the family Tingidae.	
Tumpectus	Gen. et sp. nov	Valid	Dai et al.	Cretaceous	Burmese amber	Myanmar	A member of the family Yuripopovinidae. The type species is T. triporcatus.	
Yuricoris	Gen. et sp. nov	Valid	Jarzembowski & Wang	Early Cretaceous	Weald Clay	United Kingdom	A member of the family Naucoridae. The type species is Y. maculatus.	

==== Sternorrhyncha ====
Name	Novelty	Status	Authors	Age	Type locality	Location	Notes	Images
Baikuraphis	Gen. et sp. nov	Valid	Ogłaza & Węgierek in Ogłaza et al.	Cretaceous (Albian-Cenomanian)	Ognevka Formation (Taimyr amber)	Russia (Krasnoyarsk Krai)	A member of the family Aphididae. The type species is B. abdominalis.	
Canadaphis ugolyaki	Sp. nov	Valid	Ogłaza & Węgierek in Ogłaza et al.	Late Cretaceous (Santonian)	Kheta Formation (Taimyr amber)	Russia (Krasnoyarsk Krai)	A member of the family Canadaphididae.	
Diclidophlebia venosa	Sp. nov	Valid	Burckhardt & Drohojowska in Burckhardt et al.	Miocene	Dominican amber	Dominican Republic	A member of the family Liviidae.	
Eogroehnia	Gen. et sp. nov		Drohojowska & Szwedo in Drohojowska et al.	Eocene	Baltic amber	Europe (Baltic Sea region)	A whitefly. The type species is E. carsteni.	
Fujianella	Gen. et sp. nov	Valid	Hakim & Huang	Early Cretaceous (Aptian–Albian)	Bantou Formation	China	A member of Sternorrhyncha of uncertain affinities. The type species is F. paradoxa.	
Gregorites	Gen. et 7 sp. nov	Valid	Drohojowska & Szwedo in Drohojowska, Śladowska & Szwedo	Eocene (Lutetian–Priabonian)	Danish amber	Denmark	A whitefly. The type species is G. aegiri; genus also includes G. bergelmiri, G. skadii, G. bestlae, G. thrymi, G. halogii and G. ymiri.	
Jankotejacoccus	Fam. et gen. et sp. nov		Szwedo, Azar & Sendi in Vršanský et al.	Late Jurassic (Kimmeridgian)	Aintourine Lebanese amber	Lebanon	A scale insect belonging to the group Orthezioidea/Paleococcoidea/Archaeococcidea; the type genus of the new family Jankotejacoccidae. The type species is J. libanogloria.	
Klyveria sucina	Sp. nov	Valid	Burckhardt & Drohojowska in Burckhardt et al.	Miocene	Dominican amber	Dominican Republic	A member of the family Liviidae.	
Lodevopsyllidium	Fam. et gen. et sp. nov		Boderau, Garrouste & Nel	Permian (Guadalupian)		France	A member of Protopsyllidioidea, the type genus of the new family Lodevopsyllidiidae. The type species is L. jouaulti.	
Melanastera casca	Sp. nov	Valid	Burckhardt & Drohojowska in Burckhardt et al.	Miocene	Dominican amber	Dominican Republic	A member of the family Liviidae.	
Melanastera vetus	Sp. nov	Valid	Burckhardt & Drohojowska in Burckhardt et al.	Miocene	Dominican amber	Dominican Republic	A member of the family Liviidae.	
Miotetraleurodes	Gen. et sp. nov		Drohojowska et al.	Miocene		New Zealand	A whitefly belonging to the subfamily Aleyrodinae. The type species is M. novaezelandiae.	
Permospyllidium pumilio	Sp. nov		Boderau, Garrouste & Nel	Permian (Guadalupian)		France	A member of the family Permopsyllidiidae.	
Pictala	Gen. et sp. nov		Ivanov, Vorontsov & Shcherbakov	Cretaceous	Burmese amber	Myanmar	A member of Psylloidea belonging to the family Miralidae. The type species is P. scorpioides.	
Pudrica	Gen. et sp. nov	Valid	Drohojowska & Szwedo in Drohojowska, Zmarzły & Szwedo	Probably Middle-Late Eocene	Succinite found in Brieske Formation (probably redeposited)	Germany	A whitefly. The type species is P. christianottoi.	
Sidorchukaphis	Gen. et sp. nov	Valid	Ogłaza & Węgierek in Ogłaza et al.	Late Cretaceous (Santonian)	Kheta Formation (Taimyr amber)	Russia (Krasnoyarsk Krai)	A member of the family Eriosomatidae. The type species is S. katyae.	

==== Hemipteran research ====
- Purported reduvioid cimicomorph Palaeotanyrhina exophthalma is reinterpreted as a member of the family Leptopodidae by Rédei (2024).
- Souma et al. (2024) describe fossil material of Urochela cf. melaina from the Miocene strata from Sado Island (Japan), providing evidence of past distribution of Urochela quadrinotata species group in East Asia and its origin before the Early Miocene.
- A review of the forewing venation in the Paleozoic and Mesozoic planthoppers is published by Bucher et al. (2024)
- Fabrikant et al. (2024) describe two new specimens of Mimaeurypterus burmiticus from the Cretaceous amber from Myanmar, providing new information on the morphology of this planthopper, and interpret M. burmiticus as adapted to camouflage on tree bark.
- A redescription of Bolbossus bervoetsi, based on a female and fifth instar nymph from the Eocene Baltic amber, is published by Gnezdilov (2024).
- A study on the evolution of flight performance of members of the family Palaeontinidae is published by Xu et al. (2024), who report that faunal turnover of palaeontinids at the Jurassic-Cretaceous transition was accompanied by improvement in flight abilities, and interpret this change as possibly influenced by the rise of early birds.
- Nascimento, Valezio & Krause (2024) describe trace fossils attributed to feeding chambers of cicada nymphs from the Maastrichtian Marília Formation (Brazil), providing evidence of xylem-feeding behavior similar to the behavior of extant cicada nymphs.

=== Permopsocida ===
Name	Novelty	Status	Authors	Age	Type locality	Location	Notes	Images
Carbonopsocus	Gen. et sp. nov		Prokop et al.	Carboniferous (Moscovian)	Osnabrück Formation	Germany	A member of Permopsocida belonging to the family Psocidiidae. The type species is C. mercuryi.	

=== Psocodea ===
Name	Novelty	Status	Authors	Age	Type locality	Location	Notes	Images
Archimenopon	Fam. et gen. et sp. nov	Valid	Zhang et al.	Cretaceous	Burmese amber	Myanmar	A member of the stem group of Amblycera, the type genus of the new family Archimenoponidae. The type species is A. myanmarensis.	
Cretacetrocta	Gen. et sp. nov	Valid	Hakim & Azar in Hakim, Maalouf & Azar	Early Cretaceous	Lebanese amber	Lebanon	A member of the family Pachytroctidae. The type species is C. libanella.	
Danyazarius	Gen. et sp. nov		Álvarez-Parra & Nel in Álvarez-Parra, Nel & Azar	Eocene	Oise amber	France	A member of the family Empheriidae. The type species is D. magnificus.	
Santonipsocus	Gen. et sp. nov	Valid	Álvarez-Parra et al.	Cretaceous (Albian-Cenomanian)	Charentese amber	France	A member of the family Empheriidae. The type species is S. mimeticus.	

=== Thysanoptera ===
Name	Novelty	Status	Authors	Age	Type locality	Location	Notes	Images
Avithrips	Gen. et sp. nov	Valid	Ulitzka	Late Cretaceous (Campanian)	Hti Lin amber	Myanmar	Genus includes new species is A. yellae.	
Burmathrips	Gen. et sp. nov	Valid	Peña-Kairath et al.	Late Cretaceous (Cenomanian)	Burmese amber	Myanmar	A member of the family Stenurothripidae. The type species is B. engeli.	
Campanithrips	Gen. et sp. nov	Valid	Ulitzka	Late Cretaceous (Campanian)	Hti Lin amber	Myanmar	Genus includes new species is C. kyakhei.	
Didymothrips	Gen. et sp. nov	Valid	Guo et al.	Late Cretaceous (Cenomanian)	Burmese amber	Myanmar	A thrips belonging to the family Stenurothripidae. The type species is D. abdominalis.	
Iotacypha	Gen. et 2 sp. nov	Valid	Shcherbakov, Bashkuev & Shmakov	Cretaceous (Albian-Cenomanian)	Burmese amber	Myanmar	A member of the family Lophioneuridae. The type species is I. zherikhini; genus also includes I. vishniakovae Shcherbakov & Shmakov (2024).	
Parallelothrips	Gen. et sp. nov	Valid	Guo et al.	Late Cretaceous (Cenomanian)	Burmese amber	Myanmar	A thrips belonging to the family Stenurothripidae. The type species is P. separatus.	
Retiptera	Gen. et sp. nov	Valid	Cumming et al.	Cretaceous	Burmese amber	Myanmar	A lophioneurid. The type species is R. brennae.	

== Clade Perlidea ==
=== Dermapterans ===
Name	Novelty	Status	Authors	Age	Type locality	Location	Notes	Images
Apachyus madseni	Sp. nov	Valid	Simonsen & Rasmussen in Simonsen et al.	Eocene (Ypresian)	Fur Formation	Denmark	A species of Apachyus.	
Grammoderma	Gen. et 4 sp. nov	Valid	Yin et al.	Early Cretaceous	Yixian Formation	China	A dermapterid earwig. Genus includes new species G. identicum, G. uniforme, G. kocareki and G. insolitum.	
Metaxylabis	Gen. et sp. nov		Peng et al.	Cretaceous	Burmese amber	Myanmar	A labidurid earwig. The type species is M. baii.	
Prodacnodes	Gen. et sp. nov		Peng et al.	Cretaceous; Cenomanian	Burmese amber	Myanmar	A Pygidicranidae earwig. The type species is P. dupliforceps.	
Zeugmadiplatys	Gen. et sp. nov		Peng et al.	Cretaceous	Burmese amber	Myanmar	A haplodiplatyid earwig. The type species is Z. cheni.	

=== Embiopterans ===
Name	Novelty	Status	Authors	Age	Type locality	Location	Notes	Images
Electroembia olmii	Sp. nov	Valid	Anisyutkin & Perkovsky in Anisyutkin, Legalov & Perkovsky	Eocene	Baltic amber	Russia (Kaliningrad Oblast)	A member of the family Embiidae.	
Gnethoda lata	Sp. nov	Valid	Liu, Shi, Ren & Yang in Liu et al.	Late Cretaceous (Cenomanian)	Burmese amber	Myanmar	A member of the family Clothodidae belonging to the subfamily Gnethodinae.	
Ocrognethoda	Gen. et sp. nov	Valid	Liu, Shi, Ren & Yang in Liu et al.	Late Cretaceous (Cenomanian)	Burmese amber	Myanmar	A member of the family Clothodidae belonging to the subfamily Gnethodinae. The type species is O. olivea.	
Parasorellembia hamata	Sp. nov	Valid	Liu, Shi, Ren & Yang in Liu et al.	Late Cretaceous (Cenomanian)	Burmese amber	Myanmar	A member of the family Scelembiidae belonging to the subfamily Sorellembiinae.	

=== Plecopterans ===
Name	Novelty	Status	Authors	Age	Type locality	Location	Notes	Images
Crossoperla	Fam. et gen. et sp. nov		Chen	Cretaceous	Burmese amber	Myanmar	A member of Systellognatha; the type genus of the new family Crossoperlidae. The type species is C. teslenkoae.	
Perlomyia cantalensis	Sp. nov	Valid	Boderau, Ngo-Muller & Nel	Miocene		France	A member of the family Leuctridae.	
Siberiopelta	Gen. et sp. nov	Valid	Sinitshenkova & Yan	Early Cretaceous		Russia (Buryatia)	A member of the family Peltoperlidae. The type species is S. bashkuevi.	

== Other insects ==
Name	Novelty	Status	Authors	Age	Type locality	Location	Notes	Images
Adicophasma groehni	Comb. nov	Valid	(Zompro)	Eocene; Priabonian	Baltic amber	Europe (Baltic Sea region)	A mantophasmatid moved from Raptophasma groehni (2008).	
Adicophasma hafniensis	Sp. nov	Valid	Perkovsky & Storozhenko in Perkovsky, Vasilenko & Storozhenko	Eocene; Priabonian?	Danish amber	Denmark	A mantophasmatid	
Raptophasma neli	Sp. nov	Valid	Perkovsky & Storozhenko in Perkovsky, Vasilenko & Storozhenko	Eocene; Priabonian	Baltic amber	Russia (Kaliningrad Oblast)	A mantophasmatid	
Westphaloneura	Fam. et gen. et sp. nov	Valid	Boderau et al.	Carboniferous (Bashkirian/Moscovian)		France	A member of the stem group of Neuropteroidea; the type genus of the new family Westphaloneuridae. The type species is W. magnifica.	

=== Other insect research ===
- Taxonomic revision of the miomopteran family Permosialidae is published by Aristov & Rasnitsyn (2024).
- Cui et al. (2024) describe new fossil material of Aristovia daniili from the Cretaceous amber from Myanmar, and identify Aristovia as a member of the stem group of Grylloblattodea.

== General research ==
- Evidence of the presence of distinct damage patterns on seeds from the Permian (Asselian) Shanxi Formation (China), interpreted as produced by insects with well-developed ovipositors (possibly members of Palaeodictyopteroidea), is presented by Santos, Wappler & (2024).
- A study on the taxonomy and taphonomy of insects fossils from Alderton Hill (Gloucestershire, United Kingdom), providing evidence of the presence of a diverse insect fauna (including representatives of 12 orders, 21 families, 24 genera and 21 species) during the Toarcian Oceanic Anoxic Event, is published by Swaby et al. (2024).
- A study on mine damage on gymnosperm specimens from the Middle Jurassic Jiulongshan Formation (China), probably produced by members of basal lineages of polyphagan beetles, monotrysian moths and tenthredinoid sawflies, is published by Xiao et al. (2024), who argue that the evolution of the mining associations of insects with gymnospermous plants during the Jurassic was likely caused by the appearance of new, more foliose plant lineages that provided more accessible food resources for mining insects.
- A study on the ecology of the Aptian insect fauna from the Nova Olinda Member of the Crato Formation (Brazil) is published by Bezerra & Mendes (2024), who interpret the studied insect fauna as living in an environment similar to modern long-standing wetlands, dominated by dominanted by fully terrestrial taxa, and relatively richer in palaeopterans than insect faunas from the Yixian and Zaza formations.
- Storari et al. (2024) compare the preservation of mayfly and orthopteran fossils from the Crato Formation and mayfly fossils from the Upper Jurassic Solnhofen limestones (Germany), interpreting the differences of the preservation of the studied fossils as indicative of the presence of microbial mats during the fossilization of insects from the Crato Formation.
- Evidence indicating that the radiation of the flowering plants mitigated insect extinction (especially during the Cretaceous period) and drove the origination of insects (especially during the Cenozoic) is presented by Peris & Condamine (2024).
- Loewen et al. (2024) describe a diverse amber deposit from the Maastrichtian strata from the Big Muddy Badlands (Canada), preserving fossils of representatives of seven arthropod orders and at least 11 insect families, and interpret the studied assemblage as providing evidence of a faunal turnover among insects prior to the Cretaceous–Paleogene extinction event.
- Eight insect specimens (members of Apocrita and Brachycera, members of the families Libellulidae, Pentatomidae and Bibionidae, and three indeterminate insects), representing the first insect fossils from Serbia reported to date, are described from the Miocene Valjevo-Mionica Basin by Lazarević & Milivojević (2024).
- An assemblage of subfossil remains of insects, dominated by diverse beetles, is described from the Late Pleistocene strata from the Lebed site (Altai Republic, Russia) by Gurina et al. (2024), who interpret the studied insects as indicative of humid climate which was significantly colder than modern climate in the studied area.
