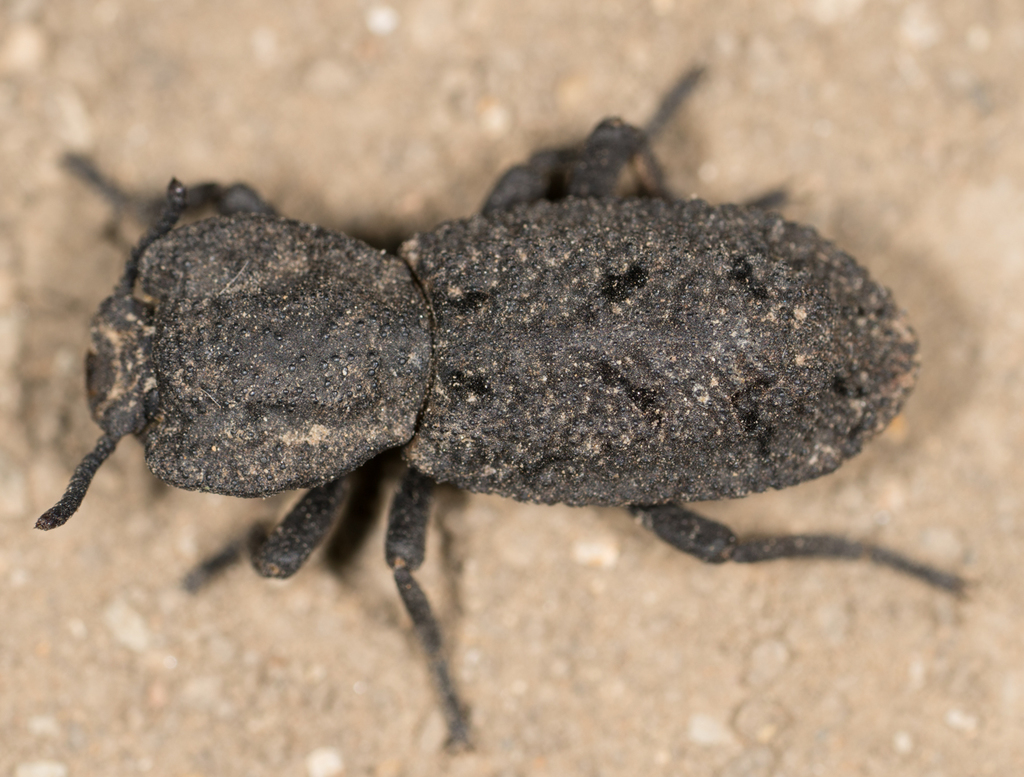
- Phloeodes diabolicus, adult

Scientific classification
- Kingdom: Animalia
- Phylum: Arthropoda
- Clade: Pancrustacea
- Class: Insecta
- Order: Coleoptera
- Suborder: Polyphaga
- Infraorder: Cucujiformia
- Family: Zopheridae
- Subfamily: Zopherinae
- Tribe: Zopherini
- Genus: Phloeodes
- Species: P. diabolicus

Binomial name
- Phloeodes diabolicus (LeConte, 1851)

Synonyms
- Nosoderma diabolicum, Noserus diabolicus

= Phloeodes diabolicus =

Species of beetle

The diabolical ironclad beetle (Phloeodes diabolicus), formerly classified as Nosoderma diabolicum, is a beetle in the Phloeodes genus. It is native to the California floristic province of California and Baja California, It is likely a fungivore either feeding on lichen growing on tree bark or feeds on fungi growing on dead trees. It is flightless and has a remarkable adult lifespan of eight years, compared to the weeks or months of most adult beetles.

This beetle is noted for its durability. Its thick, densely layered, interlocking elytra, connected to the ventral cuticle by complex lateral support structures, are able to support a maximum force of 149 newtons, or over 15 kilograms or 33.069 lbs.

== Taxonomy ==
The species was named for and initially categorized taxonomically by John LeConte. When this species was first identified in the 1800s, it was classified as a member of the Nosoderma genus, as were all of what were later re-classified as Phloeodes. The genus Noserus was also described by LeCont during the 1800s, but was later made synonymous with Phloeodes in 1999, as it was determined that P. diabolicus and P. plicatus (then Nosoderma plicatus), both key species in their genera, belong in the same genus. The entire genus was moved from Tenebrionidae to Zopheridae. Multiple other species, such as P. latipennis, that were initially identified by a few specimens were later made synonymous with P. diabolicus starting in 1936 and continuing until 2006. Individual differences in taxonomic classification continue, including the entire genus Phloeodes being absorbed into Nosoderma (Verodes), but as of 2008 the genus Phloeodes has been restored and P. diabolicus is classified within it.

== Ecology and behavior ==
Phloeodes diabolicus shares a range with Nosoderma plicatum, a reproductively isolated sister species. Their range encompasses California, portions of southern Oregon, and Baja California. Like other Zopherini, these insects are holometabolous and well adapted to boring through wood, particularly in the larval stage, when they possess a larger thorax and smaller legs than non-wood boring beetles. These beetles are believed to be generalist decomposers eating rotten wood from many species of trees and shrubs and the fungi that grow upon the wood. Nosoderma diabolicum is noted to be found most frequently underneath the bark of decomposing oak trees, so it is believed that it prefers white rot fungi as a food source. This species is flightless, with fused elytra theorized to have evolved for protection from crushing and evaporative moisture loss throughout its long lifespan of approximately eight years. This allows it to survive in drier climates and resist predation by birds and lizards, though it is unable to fly away from them.

Other commonalities with the rest of its associated family include a tendency to play dead when threatened and the ability to go long periods without food or water. Unlike other species in its family, the waxy secreted coating that normally prevents moisture loss is believed to also serve a function in sexual attraction in Phloeodes diabolicus since in this species the secretion is a masculine secondary sex characteristic.

== Shell structure ==
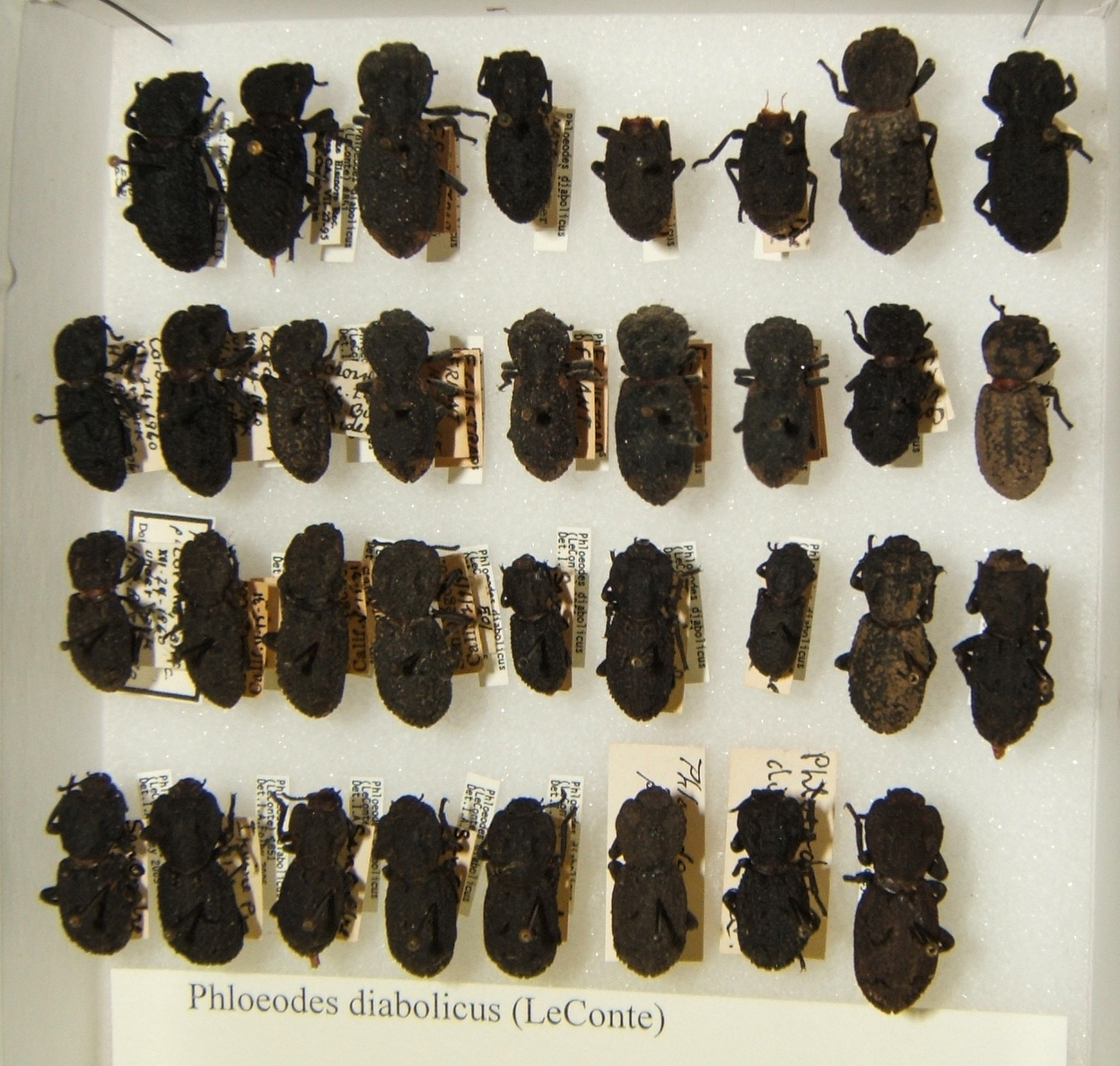
Pinned specimens

The flattened shape, low-to-the-ground profile, and tough exoskeleton of the diabolical ironclad beetle makes it extremely hard to crush; the structure of the procuticle allows for focused compressive forces to be distributed evenly across the beetle's body. Because of the exoskeleton's toughness, collectors find it extremely difficult to pin specimens. The beetles cannot be mounted normally; a hole must be drilled in the shell for the pin to be inserted.

A jigsaw-like layering of multiple scales of different sizes, ranging from microscopic to visible sizes, provides exceptional mechanical strength to the beetle's appendages. In the beetle's procuticle, polysaccharide α-chitin combines with proteins to form fibers within each layer. These fibers spiral, creating a helicoid arrangement and forming laminated structures. This formation allows for a strong, energy-absorbent, and tolerant exoskeleton. The exoskeleton deflects, twists, and arrests crack propagation between layers. The beetle's exoskeleton is protein-rich, without the inorganic structures common in crustacean exoskeletons, and contains a thicker endocuticle than other insects.

There are two main areas that allow the skeleton to endure such forces as much as 39,000 times its own body weight. The first is the connection between the hardened elytra: they are locked in place with a zipper-like connection, which increases the exoskeleton's strength but prevents the beetle from opening its wings to fly. The back of the beetle is not interlocked in the same way, allowing the bottom halves to slide past each other, providing flexibility to absorb squishing compression. The second area is the puzzle-like design that runs the length of the back connecting the left and right side. Protrusions called blades fit together like jigsaw pieces, glued together by proteins aiding in damage resistance. The connection allows the blades to absorb impacts without snapping. This protection allows the beetle to be almost predator proof, denying most species the ability to break the shell.

The structure of its shell has inspired efforts to design similar materials and joints for use in submillimeter engineering.
