= Aspathines (beetle) =

Scientific classification
- Domain: Eukaryota
- Kingdom: Animalia
- Phylum: Arthropoda
- Class: Insecta
- Order: Coleoptera
- Suborder: Polyphaga
- Infraorder: Cucujiformia
- Family: Zopheridae
- Subfamily: Zopherinae
- Genus: Aspathines; Champion, 1888

Genus of beetles

Aspathines is a genus of opossum beetles in the family Zopheridae. There is at least one described species in Aspathines, A. aeneus.
