= Usechimorpha barberi =

Scientific classification
- Domain: Eukaryota
- Kingdom: Animalia
- Phylum: Arthropoda
- Class: Insecta
- Order: Coleoptera
- Suborder: Polyphaga
- Infraorder: Cucujiformia
- Family: Zopheridae
- Tribe: Usechini
- Genus: Usechimorpha
- Species: U. barberi

Binomial name
- Usechimorpha barberi Blaisdell, 1929

Species of beetle

Usechimorpha barberi is a species of ironclad beetle in the family Zopheridae. It is found in North America.
