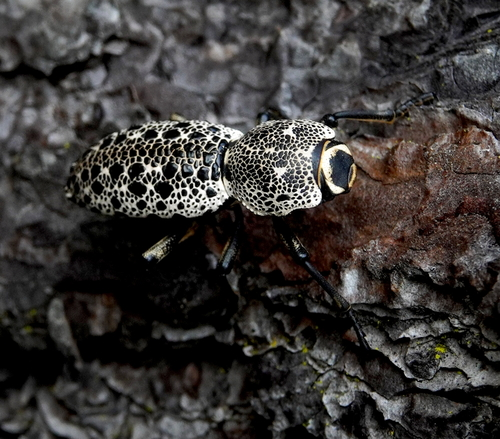

Scientific classification
- Kingdom: Animalia
- Phylum: Arthropoda
- Class: Insecta
- Order: Coleoptera
- Suborder: Polyphaga
- Infraorder: Cucujiformia
- Family: Zopheridae
- Genus: Zopherus
- Species: Z. jourdani

Binomial name
- Zopherus jourdani Sallé, 1849

Synonyms
- Zopherus jourdanii Zopherus costaricensis

= Zopherus jourdani =

Species of beetle

Zopherus jourdani is a species of ironclad beetle found in Central America. It is found in Honduras, Costa Rica, El Salvador, Guatemala, Mexico, and Nicaragua, and has been collected every month of the year from altitudes ranging from 2,500 to 9,800 feet (760 to 2,990 m). The species plays dead when disturbed, which earned it the name durene niño in Costa Rica. It lives under the bark of trees, including balsa and pine.

== Ability to go without food ==
The ability of Z. jourdani to survive for an extended time without food is documented in several papers and journals; it is known as caméleon in Guatemala because of this ability. In the 1877–1878 Annales de la Sociéte Entomologique de Belgique, such a demonstration is recorded on the July 6 meeting: "Mr. J. Rodriguèz brought six examples from Guatemala, kept without food in a box during the since the month of April. Three arrived in Europe still alive." (French: M. J. Rodriguez vient d'en apporter de Guatemala six examplaires, demeurés sans nourriture dans un boîte depuis le mois d'Avril. Trois sont arrivés encore vivants en Europe.)

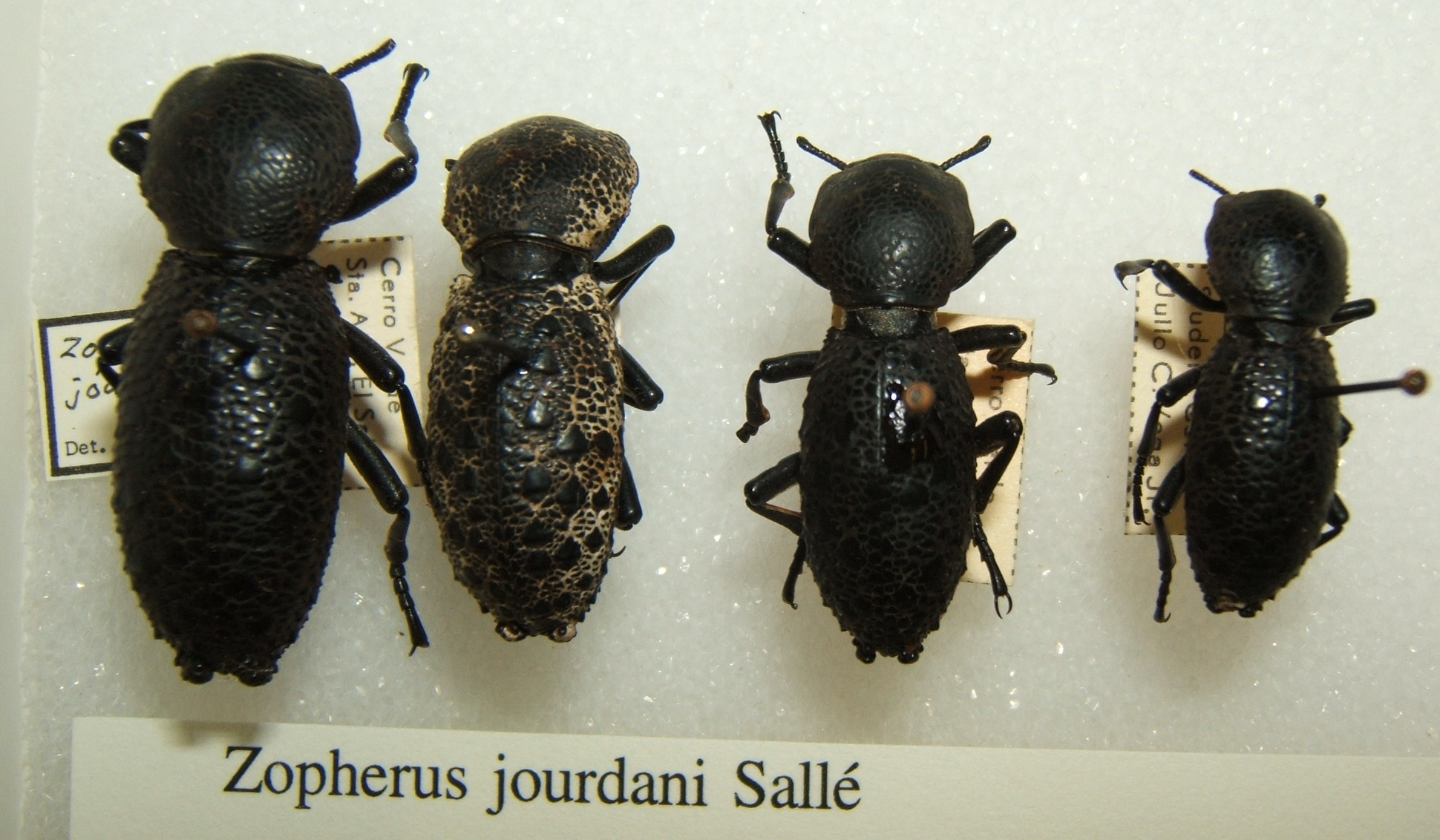
Zopherus jourdani on display at the Texas A&M University Insect Collection

== Appearance ==
Specimens of Z. jourdani have variable colouration; they are mottled black and white, but the amount of each colour present varies. Light forms from Costa Rica were described by George C. Champion in 1874 as Z. costaricensis, which was synonymized nearly a century later in 1972. Based on measurements recorded by Charles Triplehorn, it is one of the largest species in the genus, Z. chilensis being the largest. Z. jourdani has a length between 17.7 and 36 mm, and a width of 6.1–12 mm.
