= Usechimorpha =

Scientific classification
- Domain: Eukaryota
- Kingdom: Animalia
- Phylum: Arthropoda
- Class: Insecta
- Order: Coleoptera
- Suborder: Polyphaga
- Infraorder: Cucujiformia
- Family: Zopheridae
- Subfamily: Zopherinae
- Tribe: Usechini
- Genus: Usechimorpha; Blaisdell, 1929

Genus of beetles

Usechimorpha is a genus of ironclad beetles in the family Zopheridae. There are at least three described species in Usechimorpha.

== Species ==
These three species belong to the genus Usechimorpha:

- Usechimorpha barberi Blaisdell, 1929
- Usechimorpha montana
- Usechimorpha montanus Doyen in Doyen & Lawrence, 1979
