= Usechus lacerta =

Scientific classification
- Kingdom: Animalia
- Phylum: Arthropoda
- Class: Insecta
- Order: Coleoptera
- Suborder: Polyphaga
- Infraorder: Cucujiformia
- Family: Zopheridae
- Genus: Usechus
- Species: U. lacerta

Binomial name
- Usechus lacerta Motschulsky, 1845

Species of beetle

Usechus lacerta is a species of ironclad beetle in the family Zopheridae. It is found in North America.
