= Colydium nigripenne =

Scientific classification
- Domain: Eukaryota
- Kingdom: Animalia
- Phylum: Arthropoda
- Class: Insecta
- Order: Coleoptera
- Suborder: Polyphaga
- Infraorder: Cucujiformia
- Family: Zopheridae
- Genus: Colydium
- Species: C. nigripenne

Binomial name
- Colydium nigripenne LeConte, 1863

Synonyms
- Colydium bicoloratum Blatchley, 1925

Species of beetle

Colydium nigripenne is a species of cylindrical bark beetle in the family Zopheridae. It is found in North America.
