= Colydium glabriculum =

Scientific classification
- Domain: Eukaryota
- Kingdom: Animalia
- Phylum: Arthropoda
- Class: Insecta
- Order: Coleoptera
- Suborder: Polyphaga
- Infraorder: Cucujiformia
- Family: Zopheridae
- Subfamily: Colydiinae
- Genus: Colydium
- Species: C. glabriculum

Binomial name
- Colydium glabriculum Stephan, 1989

Synonyms
- Colydium chiricahuae Dajoz, 1992

Species of beetle

Colydium glabriculum is a species of cylindrical bark beetle in the family Zopheridae. It is found in North America.
