= Monomma attenuatum subcarinatum =

Scientific classification
- Kingdom: Animalia
- Phylum: Arthropoda
- Class: Insecta
- Order: Coleoptera
- Suborder: Polyphaga
- Infraorder: Cucujiformia
- Family: Zopheridae
- Genus: Monomma
- Species: M. attenuatum
- Subspecies: M. a. subcarinatum

Trinomial name
- Monomma attenuatum subcarinatum Freude, 1958

Beetle subspecies

Monomma attenuatum subcarinatum is a subspecies of beetle in the family Zopheridae.

It lives in East Africa.
