= Z. gracilis =

Z. gracilis may refer to:

- Zopherus gracilis, a beetle species
- Zygodon gracilis, a moss species

== See also ==
- Gracilis (disambiguation)
