= Zopherus granicollis =

Scientific classification
- Kingdom: Animalia
- Phylum: Arthropoda
- Class: Insecta
- Order: Coleoptera
- Suborder: Polyphaga
- Infraorder: Cucujiformia
- Family: Zopheridae
- Subfamily: Zopherinae
- Genus: Zopherus
- Species: Z. granicollis

Binomial name
- Zopherus granicollis Horn, 1885

Species of beetle

Zopherus granicollis is a species of ironclad beetle in the family Zopheridae. It is found in Central America and North America.

== Subspecies ==
These two subspecies belong to the species Zopherus granicollis:

- Zopherus granicollis granicollis Horn, 1885
- Zopherus granicollis ventriosus (Casey, 1907)
