= Rhagodera tuberculata =

Scientific classification
- Domain: Eukaryota
- Kingdom: Animalia
- Phylum: Arthropoda
- Class: Insecta
- Order: Coleoptera
- Suborder: Polyphaga
- Infraorder: Cucujiformia
- Family: Zopheridae
- Genus: Rhagodera
- Species: R. tuberculata

Binomial name
- Rhagodera tuberculata Mannerheim, 1843

Species of beetle

Rhagodera tuberculata is a species of cylindrical bark beetle in the family Zopheridae. It is found in North America.
