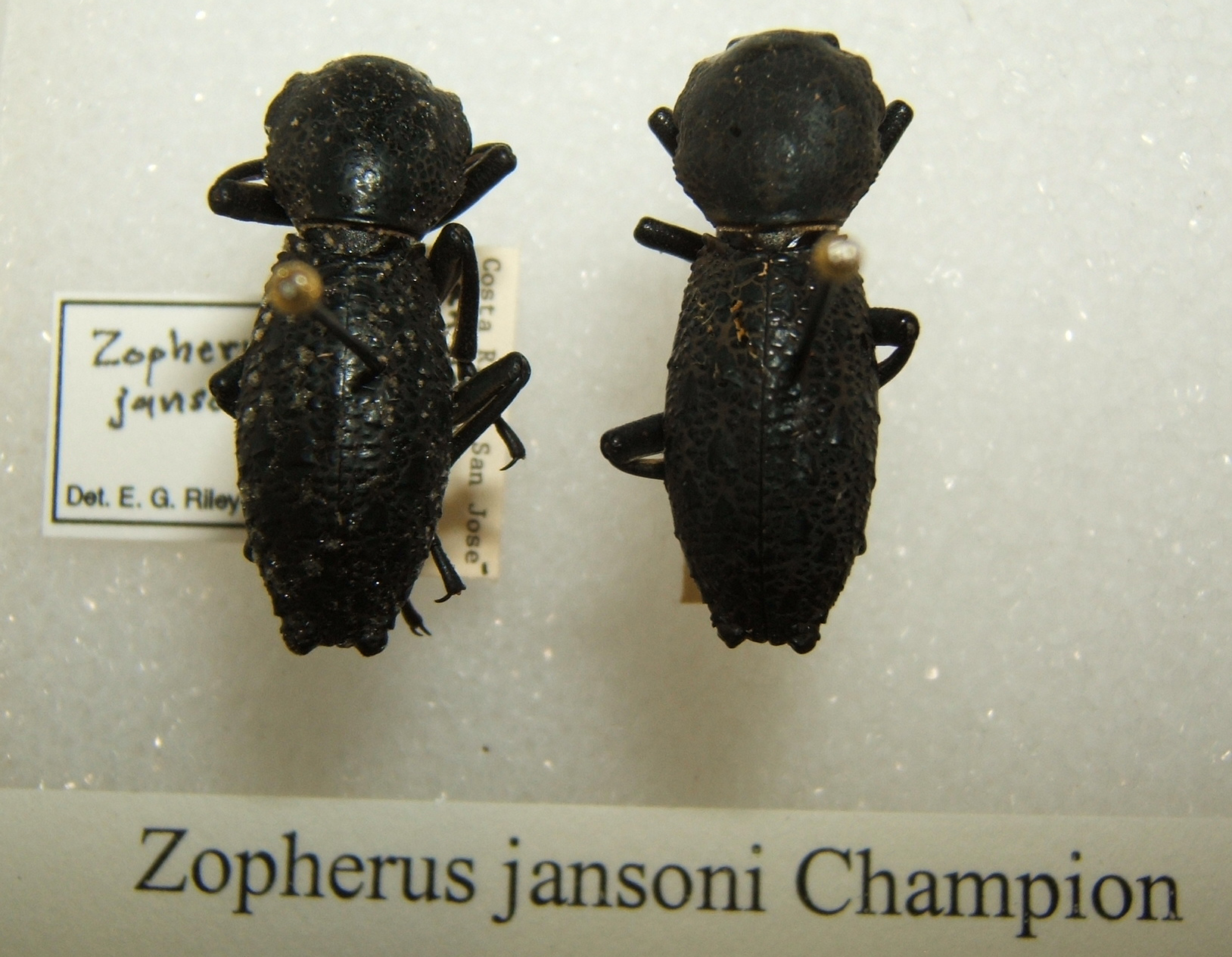

Scientific classification
- Kingdom: Animalia
- Phylum: Arthropoda
- Class: Insecta
- Order: Coleoptera
- Suborder: Polyphaga
- Infraorder: Cucujiformia
- Family: Zopheridae
- Subfamily: Zopherinae
- Genus: Zopherus
- Species: Z. jansoni

Binomial name
- Zopherus jansoni Champion, 1884

= Zopherus jansoni =

Species of beetle

Zopherus jansoni is a species of ironclad beetle in the family Zopheridae.
