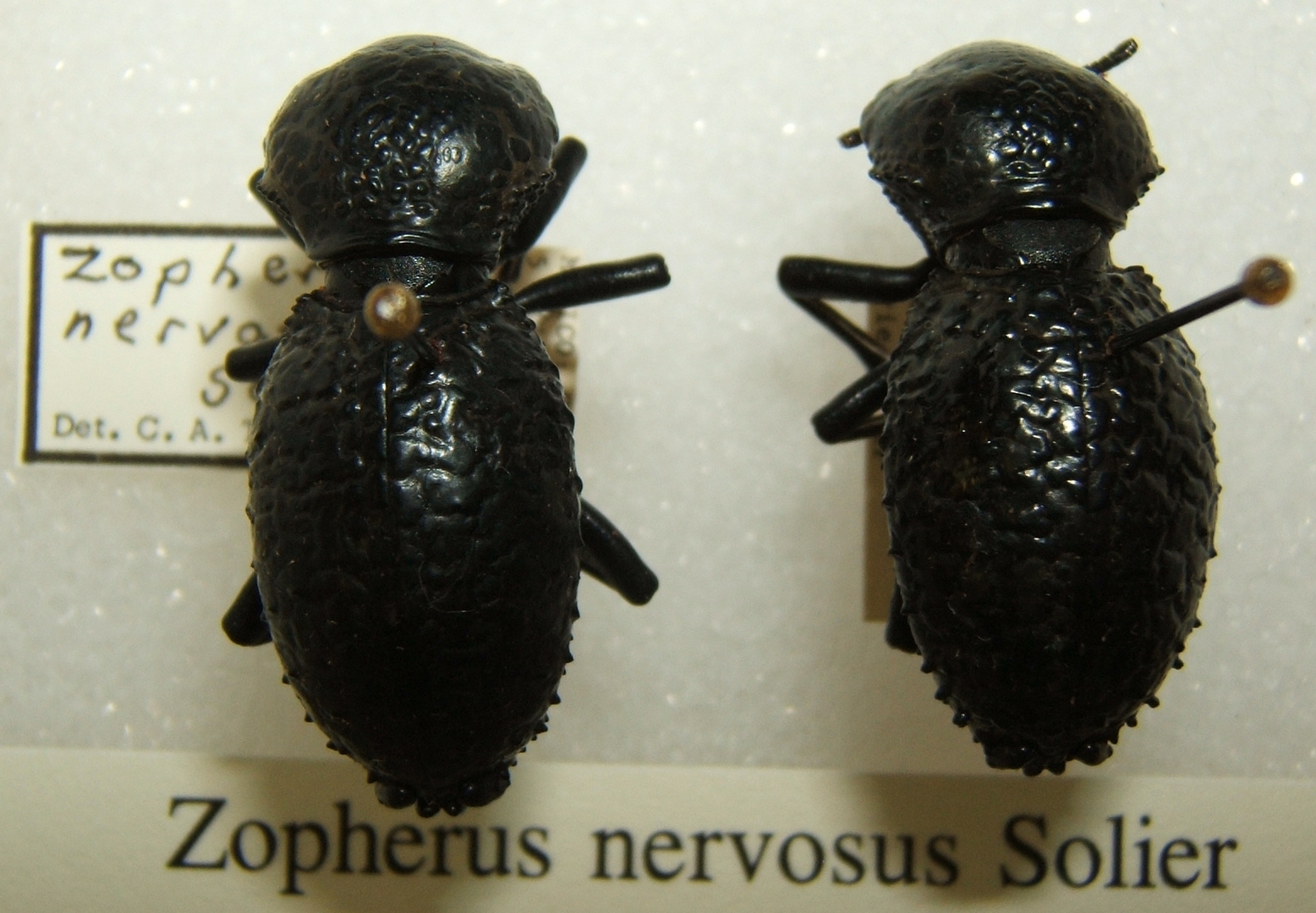

Scientific classification
- Kingdom: Animalia
- Phylum: Arthropoda
- Class: Insecta
- Order: Coleoptera
- Suborder: Polyphaga
- Infraorder: Cucujiformia
- Family: Zopheridae
- Subfamily: Zopherinae
- Genus: Zopherus
- Species: Z. nervosus

Binomial name
- Zopherus nervosus Solier, 1841

= Zopherus nervosus =

Species of beetle

Zopherus nervosus is a species of ironclad beetle in the family Zopheridae.
