= Usechus =

Scientific classification
- Kingdom: Animalia
- Phylum: Arthropoda
- Class: Insecta
- Order: Coleoptera
- Suborder: Polyphaga
- Infraorder: Cucujiformia
- Family: Zopheridae
- Subfamily: Zopherinae
- Tribe: Usechini
- Genus: Usechus; Motschulsky, 1845

Genus of beetles

Usechus is a genus of ironclad beetles in the family Zopheridae. There are at least two described species in Usechus.

== Species ==
These two species belong to the genus Usechus:

- Usechus lacerta Motschulsky, 1845
- Usechus nucleatus Casey, 1889
