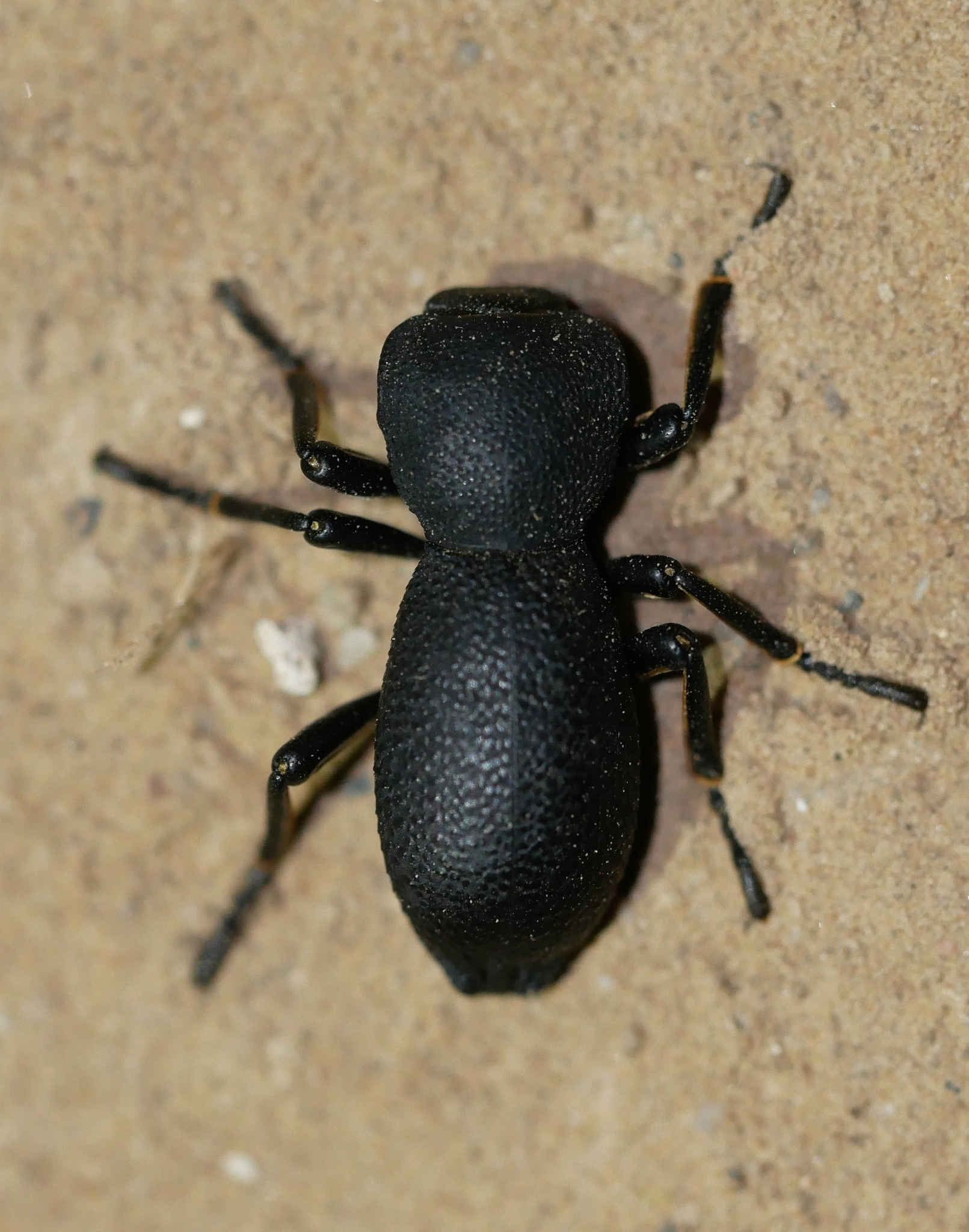

Scientific classification
- Kingdom: Animalia
- Phylum: Arthropoda
- Class: Insecta
- Order: Coleoptera
- Suborder: Polyphaga
- Infraorder: Cucujiformia
- Family: Zopheridae
- Subfamily: Zopherinae
- Genus: Zopherus
- Species: Z. uteanus

Binomial name
- Zopherus uteanus (Casey, 1907)

= Zopherus uteanus =

Species of beetle

Zopherus uteanus is a species of ironclad beetle in the family Zopheridae. It is found in North America.
