= Nosoderma sylvaticum =

Scientific classification
- Kingdom: Animalia
- Phylum: Arthropoda
- Class: Insecta
- Order: Coleoptera
- Suborder: Polyphaga
- Infraorder: Cucujiformia
- Family: Zopheridae
- Genus: Nosoderma
- Species: N. sylvaticum

Binomial name
- Nosoderma sylvaticum García-París, Coca-Abia & Parra-Olea, 2006

Species of beetle

Nosoderma sylvaticum is a beetle, belonging to the genus Nosoderma.
