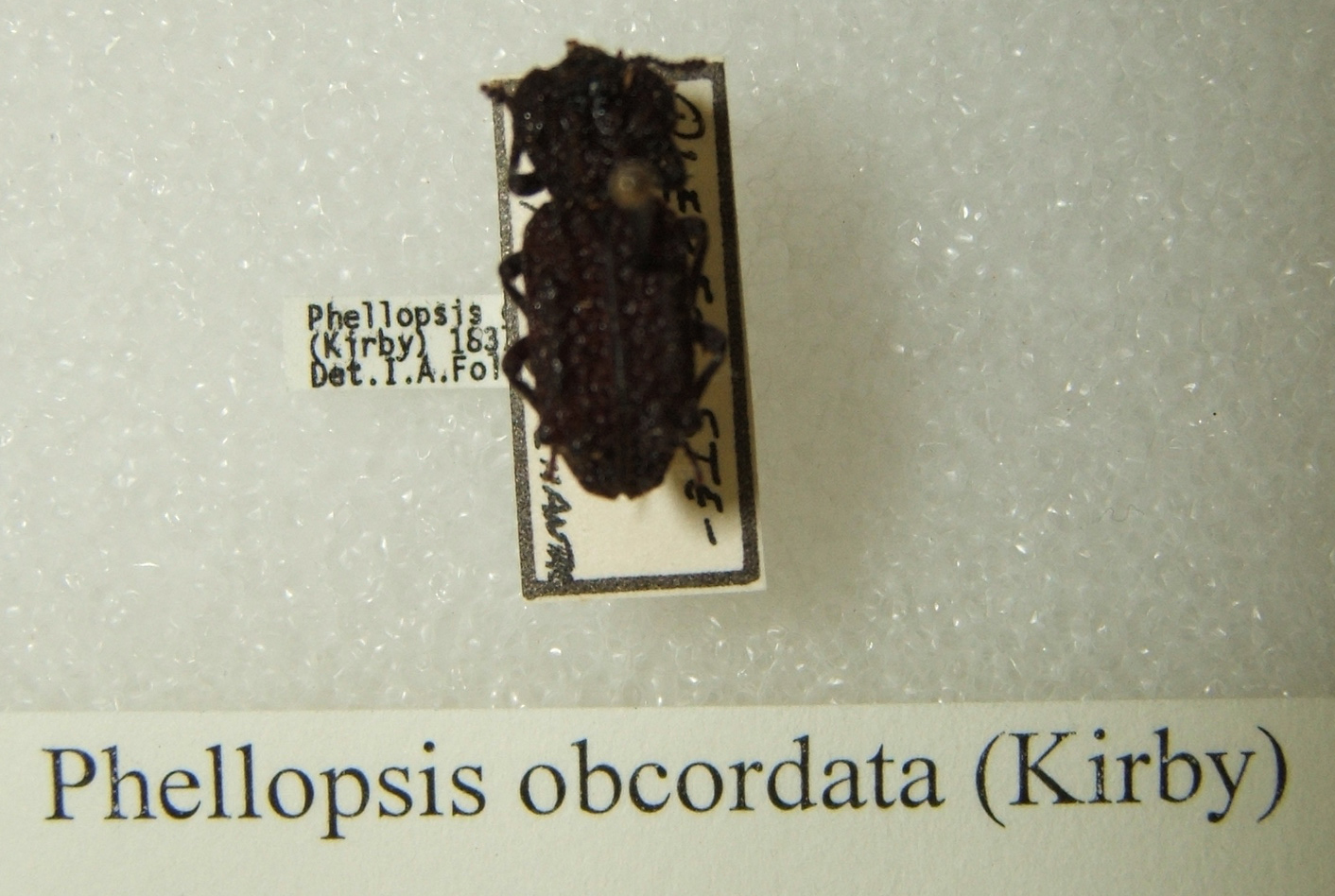
- Phellopsis obcordata, adult

Scientific classification
- Kingdom: Animalia
- Phylum: Arthropoda
- Clade: Pancrustacea
- Class: Insecta
- Order: Coleoptera
- Suborder: Polyphaga
- Infraorder: Cucujiformia
- Family: Zopheridae
- Genus: Phellopsis
- Species: P. obcordata

Binomial name
- Phellopsis obcordata (Kirby, 1873)

= Phellopsis obcordata =

Species of beetle

Phellopsis obcordata is a beetle of the Family Zopheridae occurring in eastern North America. It has a color that can be reddish to brown. It is usually 11/16 mm in length. The name Phellopsis obcordata had been historically confused with a nearly identical western species, Phellopsis porcata, until a revision of the genus in 2008.
