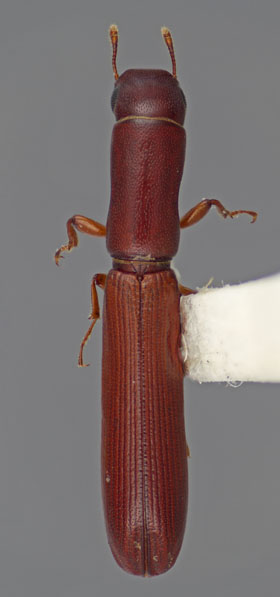

Scientific classification
- Domain: Eukaryota
- Kingdom: Animalia
- Phylum: Arthropoda
- Class: Insecta
- Order: Coleoptera
- Suborder: Polyphaga
- Infraorder: Cucujiformia
- Family: Zopheridae
- Genus: Nematidium
- Species: N. filiforme

Binomial name
- Nematidium filiforme LeConte, 1863

= Nematidium filiforme =

Species of beetle

Nematidium filiforme is a species of cylindrical bark beetle in the family Zopheridae. It is found in North America.
