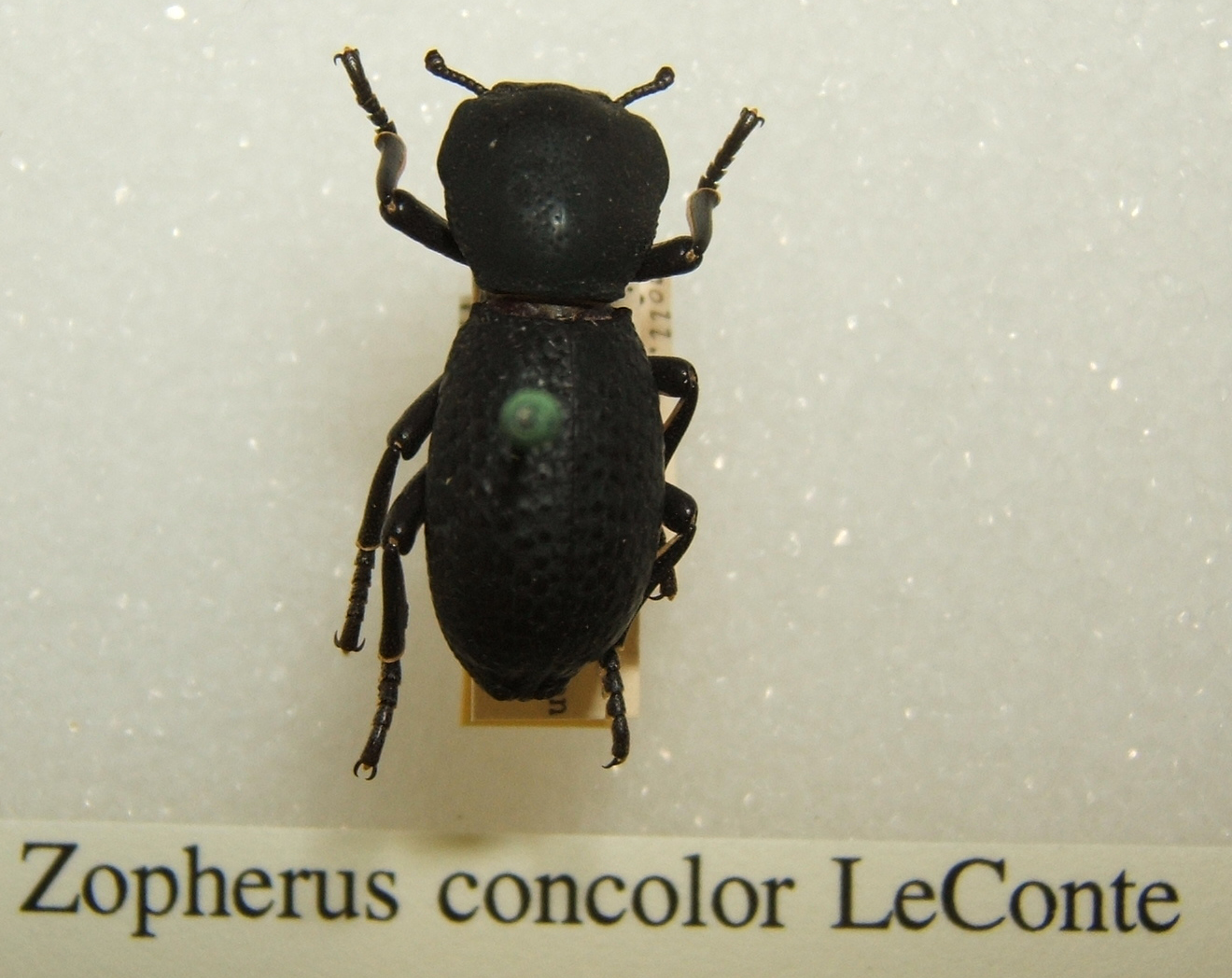
- Zopherus concolor adult taken by Shawn Hanrahan at the Texas A&M University Insect Collection in College Station, Texas.

Scientific classification
- Kingdom: Animalia
- Phylum: Arthropoda
- Class: Insecta
- Order: Coleoptera
- Suborder: Polyphaga
- Infraorder: Cucujiformia
- Family: Zopheridae
- Subfamily: Zopherinae
- Genus: Zopherus
- Species: Z. concolor

Binomial name
- Zopherus concolor LeConte, 1851

= Zopherus concolor =

Species of beetle

Zopherus concolor is a species of ironclad beetle in the family Zopheridae. It is found in North America.
