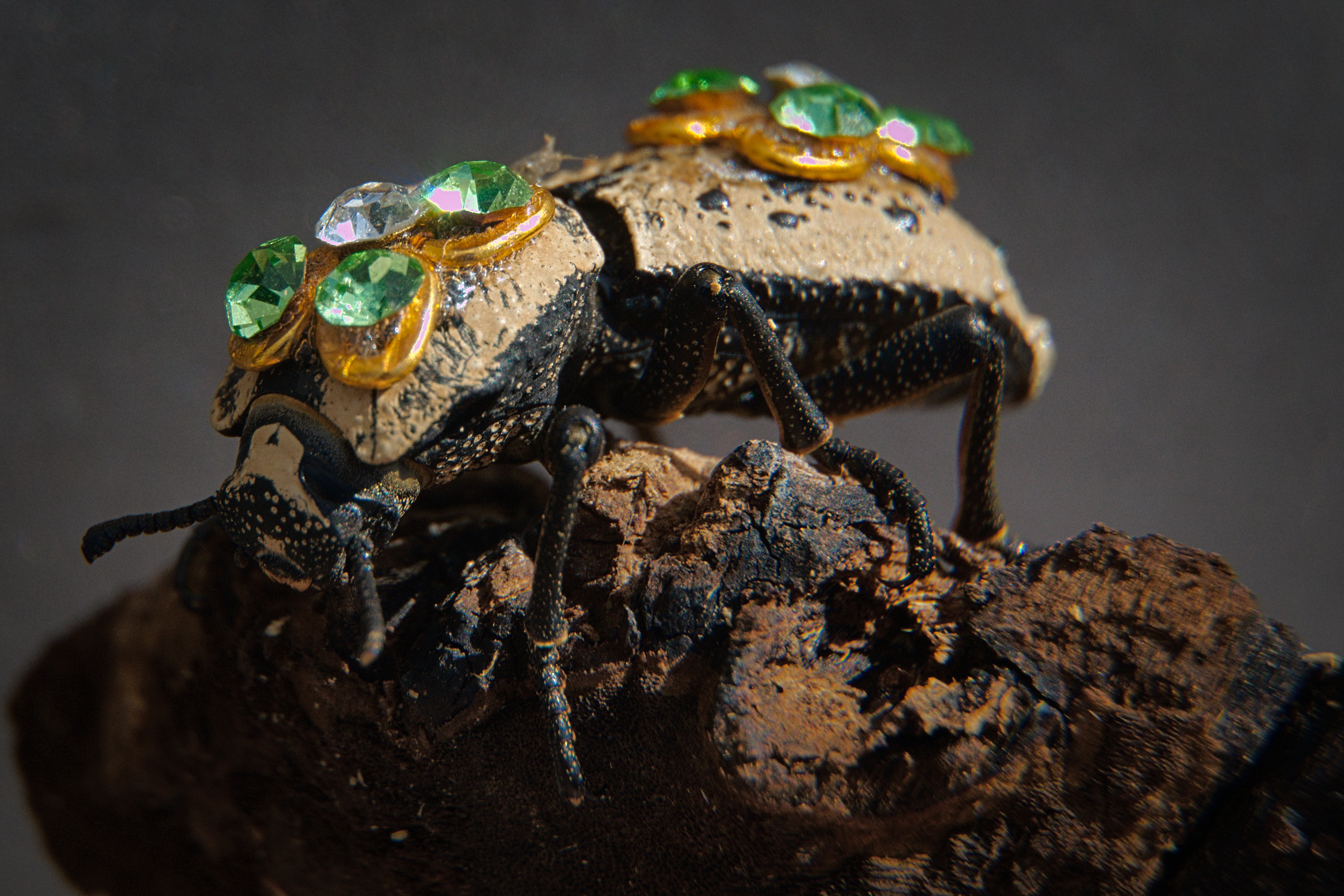

Scientific classification
- Kingdom: Animalia
- Phylum: Arthropoda
- Class: Insecta
- Order: Coleoptera
- Suborder: Polyphaga
- Infraorder: Cucujiformia
- Family: Zopheridae
- Subfamily: Zopherinae
- Genus: Zopherus
- Species: Z. chilensis

Binomial name
- Zopherus chilensis Gray, 1832

Synonyms
- List: Megazopherus chiliensis, Casey, 1907; Megazopherus chilensis, Casey, 1907; Zopherus bremei Guerin-Meneville, 1844; Zopherus chiliensis Champion, 1884; Zopherus insignis Blanchard, 1861; Zopherus Moreletii (nomen nudem), Lucas, 1852

= Zopherus chilensis =

Species of beetle

Zopherus chilensis, also commonly known as the ma'kech or jewelled bug, is a species of ironclad beetle in the family Zopheridae. Despite the name "chilensis", nearly all of the known specimens have been found from Mexico to Venezuela.

== Appearance ==
Z. chilensis is described "muted gold" to "dull white" in colour, with black blotches or tubercles on its back. It is the largest species in the genus Zopherus, and grows between 34 and 46 mm (1.3 and 1.8 in) in length; 13 to 17 mm (0.51 to 0.67 in) in width.

== As living brooches ==
In the Yucatán Peninsula, locals collect specimens of Z. chilensis and attach to their backs rhinestones, pearls, chenille, and small baubles. The beetle is then attached to a small golden leash and worn as jewellery or, more frequently in modern times, sold to tourists. The practice is at least a hundred years old.

== Life cycle, habitat, and diet ==
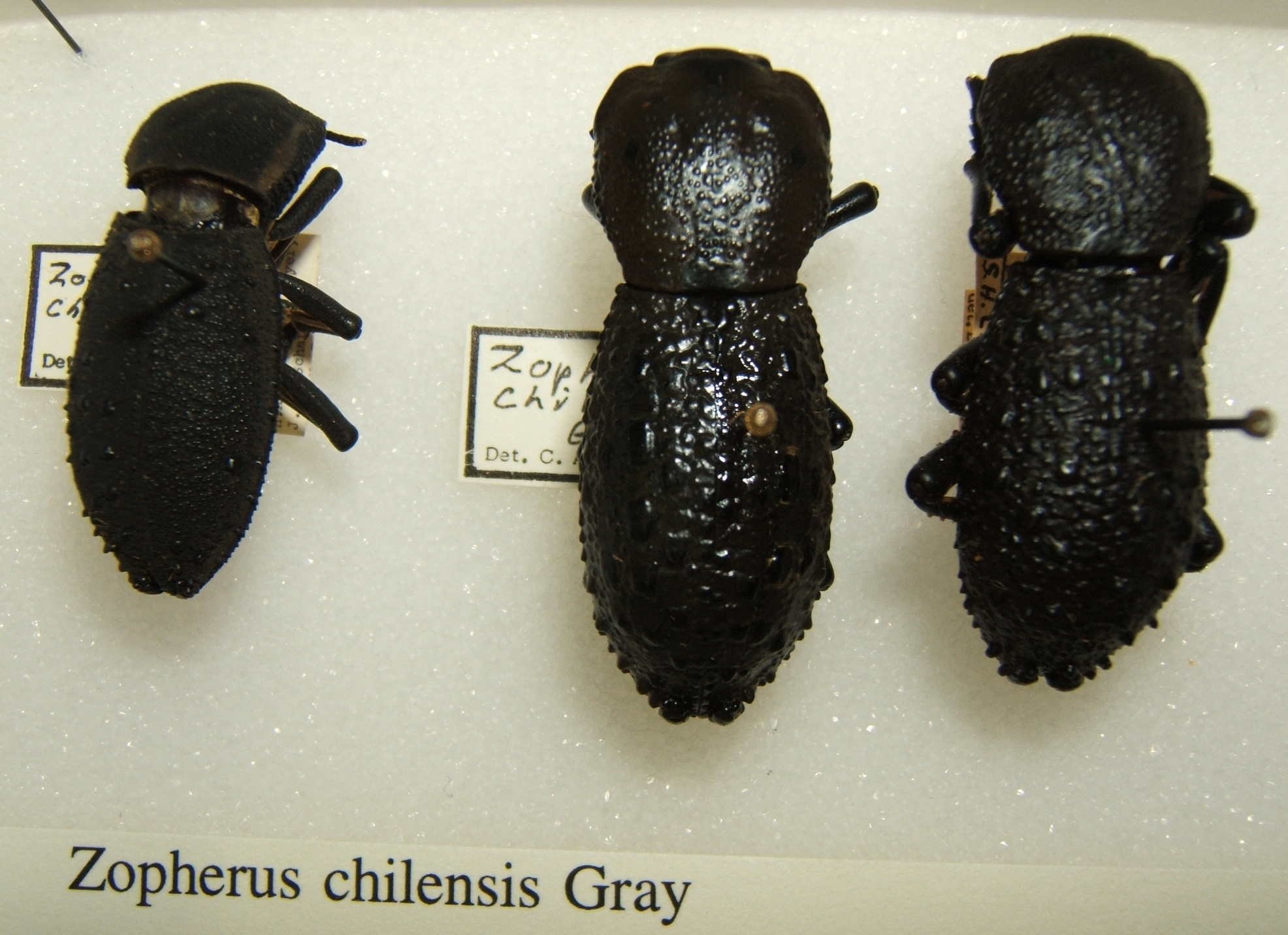

Z. chilensis lives in dead wood in arid forests and other similarly hot, dry, regions. The larvae probably mine into this wood, and feed on fungus and lichen. Adults are found underneath bark and logs, and are noted for their ability to survive for long periods of time with little or no food.
