= Colydium robustum =

Scientific classification
- Domain: Eukaryota
- Kingdom: Animalia
- Phylum: Arthropoda
- Class: Insecta
- Order: Coleoptera
- Suborder: Polyphaga
- Infraorder: Cucujiformia
- Family: Zopheridae
- Genus: Colydium
- Species: C. robustum

Binomial name
- Colydium robustum Stephan, 1989

Species of beetle

Colydium robustum is a species of cylindrical bark beetle in the family Zopheridae. It is found in North America.
