= Zopherus laevicollis =

Scientific classification
- Kingdom: Animalia
- Phylum: Arthropoda
- Clade: Pancrustacea
- Class: Insecta
- Order: Coleoptera
- Suborder: Polyphaga
- Infraorder: Cucujiformia
- Family: Zopheridae
- Subfamily: Zopherinae
- Genus: Zopherus
- Species: Z. laevicollis

Binomial name
- Zopherus laevicollis Solier, 1841

Species of beetle

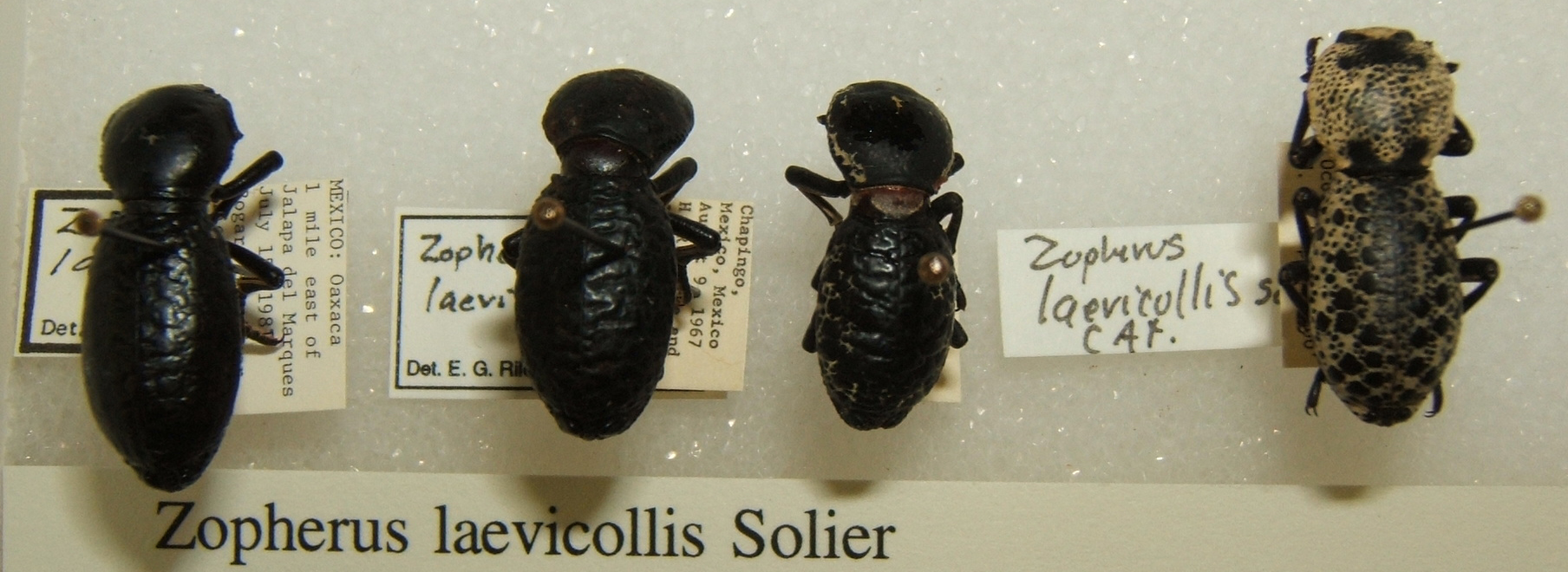
Zopherus laevicollis

Zopherus laevicollis is a species of ironclad beetle in the family Zopheridae.
