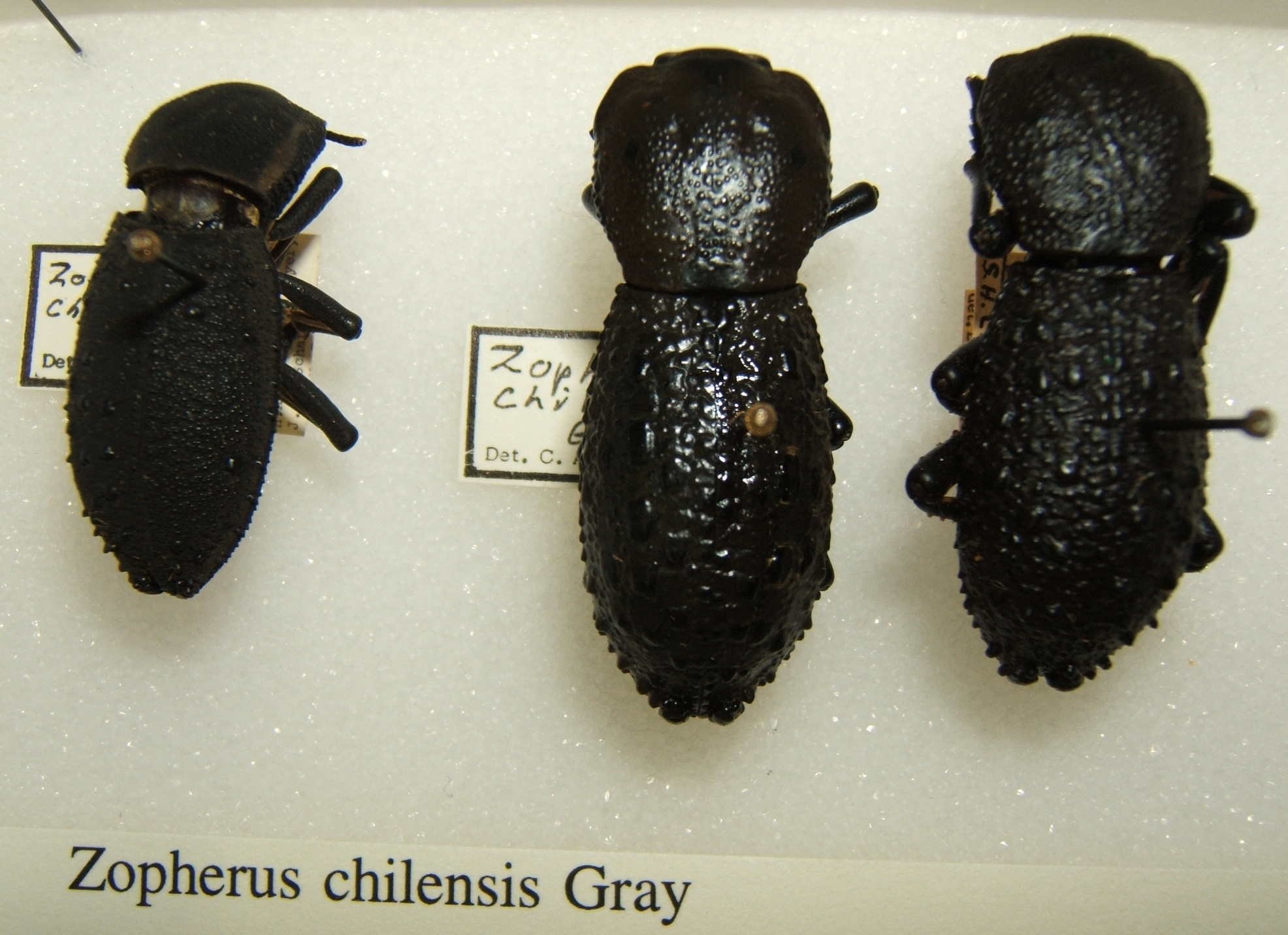
- Zopherus chilensis

Scientific classification
- Kingdom: Animalia
- Phylum: Arthropoda
- Clade: Pancrustacea
- Class: Insecta
- Order: Coleoptera
- Suborder: Polyphaga
- Infraorder: Cucujiformia
- Family: Zopheridae
- Subfamily: Zopherinae
- Genus: Zopherus; Gray, 1832

Type species
- Zopherus mexicanus Gray, 1832

Synonyms
- Zophorus Gray, 1832 (missp.); Zopherodes Casey, 1907; Megazopherus Casey, 1907; Zopherinus Casey, 1907

= Zopherus =

Genus of beetles

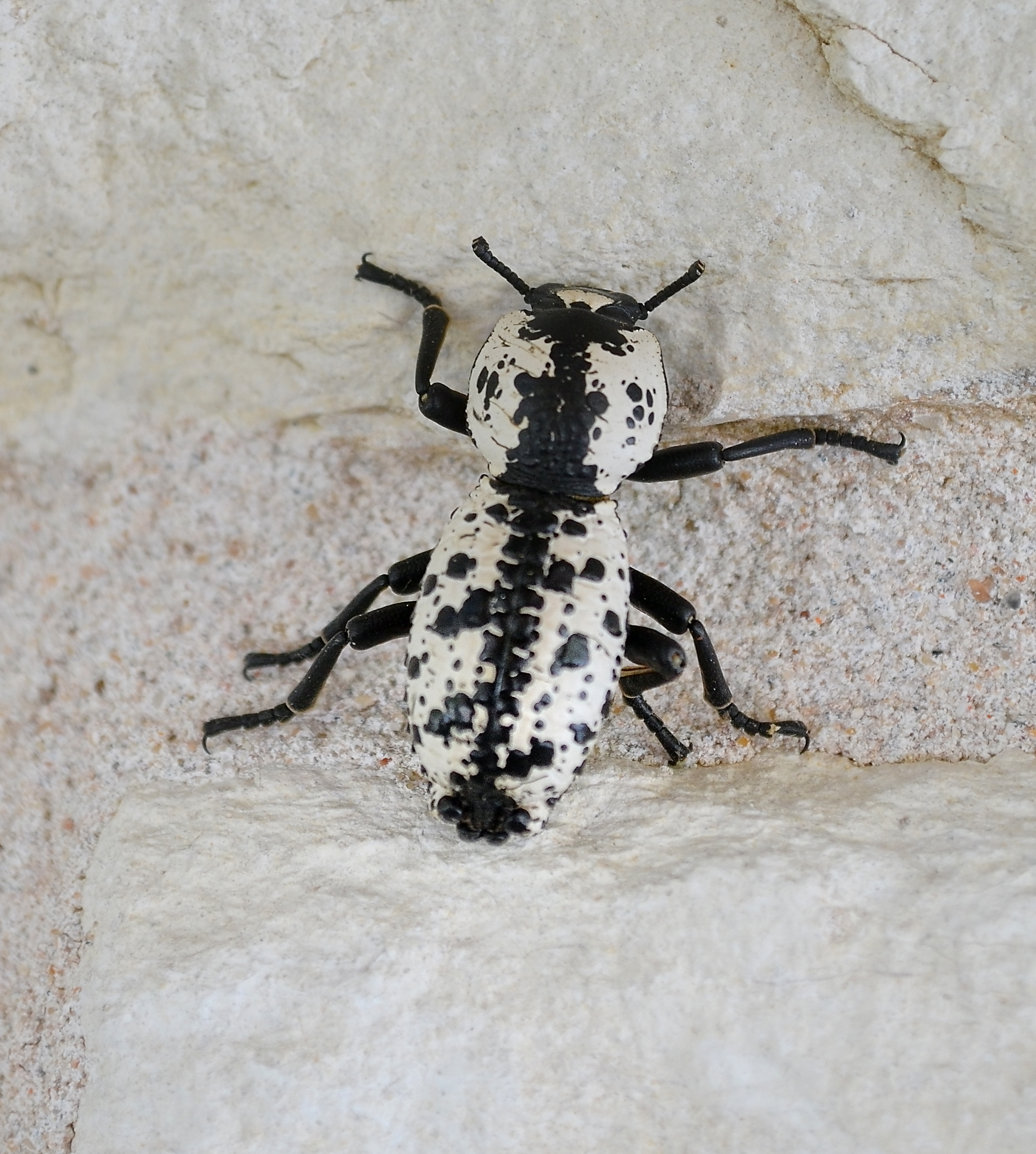
Texas ironclad beetle (Zopherus nodulosus)

Zopherus is a genus of beetles comprising 19 species. They live in the Americas and are adapted to wood-boring.

== Distribution ==
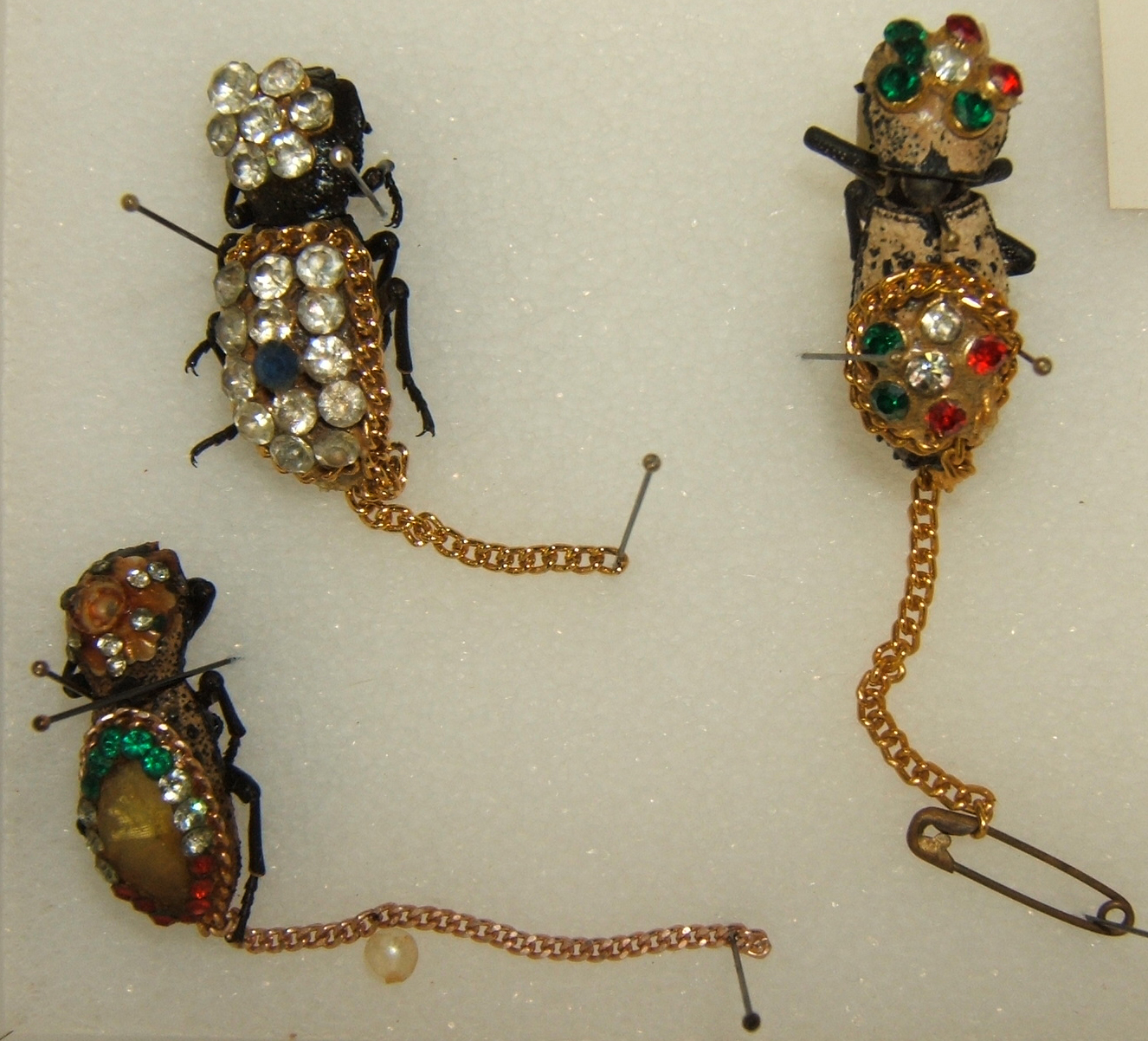
Bejeweled zopherid beetles

Species of Zopherus only live in the Americas, where they are distributed from Venezuela to the southern United States. Ten species live in the United States, five of them in California.

== Description ==
Members of the genus are long and cylindrical, with very thick exoskeletons. Indeed, the elytra are so thick that it is often necessary to drill a hole in them in order to mount specimens. Species living north of the Rio Grande are almost all uniformly black in colour, while the tropical species are almost all strongly patterned in contrasting black and white. The animal's head is largely hidden by the thorax. The elytra are fused together, rendering Zopherus species unable to fly.

== Ecology ==
Zopherus species are adapted for boring into wood, some species even being reported to bore into sound wood, rather than only dead wood. Z. tristis lives under the bark of the desert tamarisk in the Colorado Desert, while Z. granicollis bores into the root crowns of Jeffrey pine (Pinus jeffreyi) and single-leaf pine (Pinus monophylla).

== Taxonomy ==
The genus Zopherus encompasses species previously referred to three other genera, Megazopherus, Zopherinus and Zopherodes, all of which are now synonymized under Zopherus. Many of the species have also been known by a number of taxonomic synonyms. The genus was initially erected in 1832 by George Robert Gray, using the spelling Zophorus. This was later emended by Laporte de Castelnau to the more usual transliteration Zopherus; the authorship should nonetheless ascribed to Gray, and not to Laporte, as many authors have done.

== Use as living jewels ==
The species Zopherus chilensis from Yucatán, Mexico, has been used in jewelry as living jewels.

== Etymology ==
The name Zopherus is from the Greek: zopher, meaning "dusky" or "gloomy".

== Diet ==
Although the zopherus are highly adapted for wood boring they are likely fungivores feeding on fungus growing on dead trees, and some species feed on lichen growing outside on the outer bark.

=== Species ===
Charles A. Triplehorn recognised 19 species in his 1972 monograph:

- Zopherus angulicollis Champion, 1884
- Zopherus championi Triplehorn, 1972
- Zopherus chilensis Gray, 1832
- Zopherus concolor LeConte, 1851
- Zopherus elegans Horn, 1870
- Zopherus gracilis Horn, 1867
- Zopherus granicollis Horn, 1885
- Zopherus jansoni Champion, 1884
- Zopherus jourdani Sallé, 1849
- Zopherus laevicollis Colier, 1841
- Zopherus mexicanus Gray, 1832
- Zopherus nervosus Solier, 1841
- Zopherus nodulosus Solier, 1841
- Zopherus opacus Horn, 1867
- Zopherus sanctaehelenae (Blaisdell, 1931)
- Zopherus solieri Triplehorn, 1972
- Zopherus tristis LeConte, 1851
- Zopherus uteanus (Casey, 1907)
- Zopherus xestus Triplehorn, 1972
