= Rhagodera =

Scientific classification
- Domain: Eukaryota
- Kingdom: Animalia
- Phylum: Arthropoda
- Class: Insecta
- Order: Coleoptera
- Suborder: Polyphaga
- Infraorder: Cucujiformia
- Family: Zopheridae
- Subfamily: Colydiinae
- Genus: Rhagodera; Mannerheim, 1843

Genus of beetles

Rhagodera is a genus of cylindrical bark beetles in the family Zopheridae. There are at least four described species in Rhagodera.

== Species ==
These four species belong to the genus Rhagodera:

- Rhagodera costata Horn, 1867
- Rhagodera interrupta Stephan, 1989
- Rhagodera texana Stephan, 1989
- Rhagodera tuberculata Mannerheim, 1843
