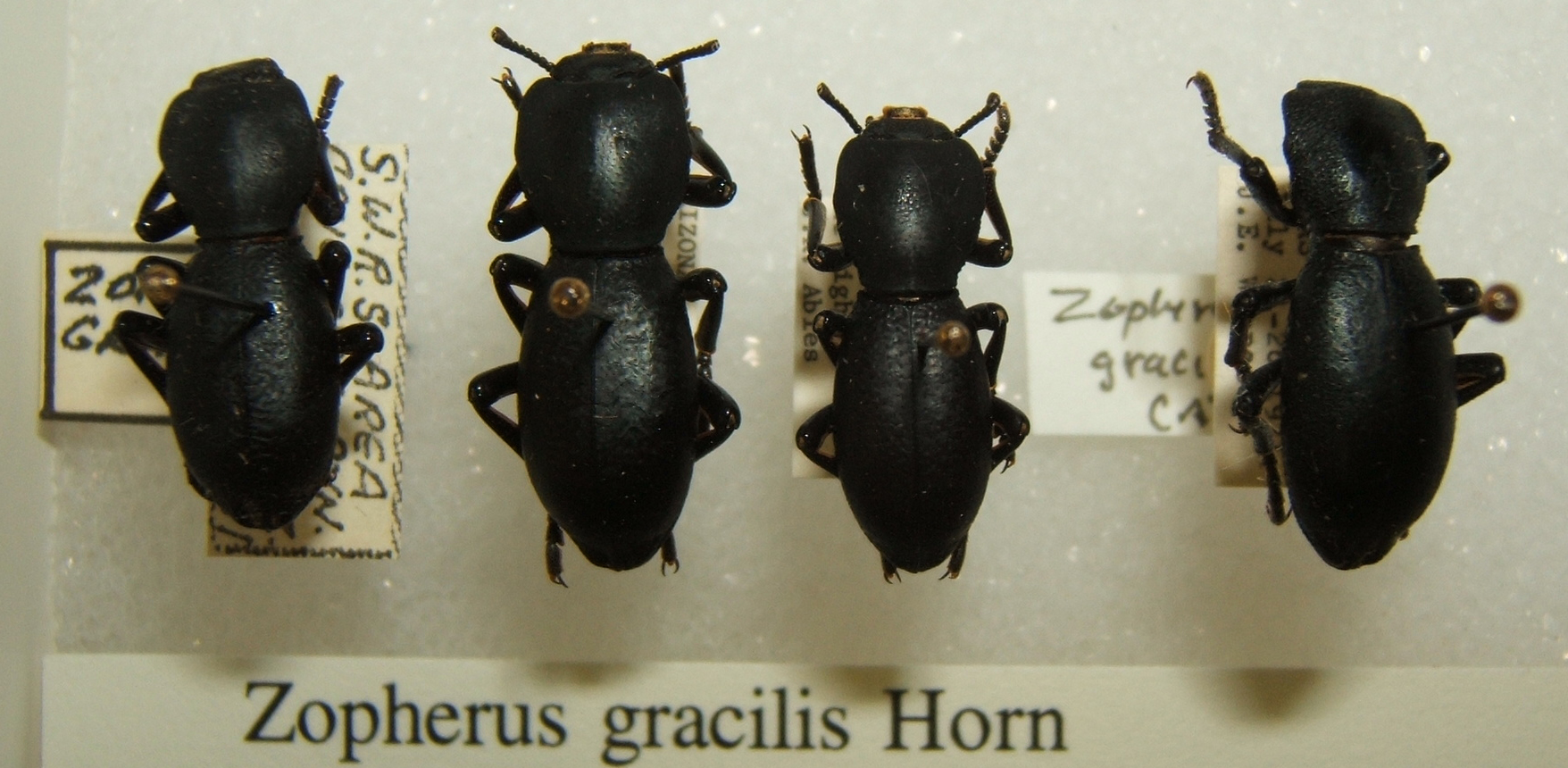
- Specimens in the Texas A&M University Insect Collection

Scientific classification
- Kingdom: Animalia
- Phylum: Arthropoda
- Class: Insecta
- Order: Coleoptera
- Suborder: Polyphaga
- Infraorder: Cucujiformia
- Family: Zopheridae
- Subfamily: Zopherinae
- Genus: Zopherus
- Species: Z. gracilis

Binomial name
- Zopherus gracilis Horn, 1867

= Zopherus gracilis =

Species of beetle

Zopherus gracilis is a species of ironclad beetle in the family Zopheridae. It is found in Central America and North America.
