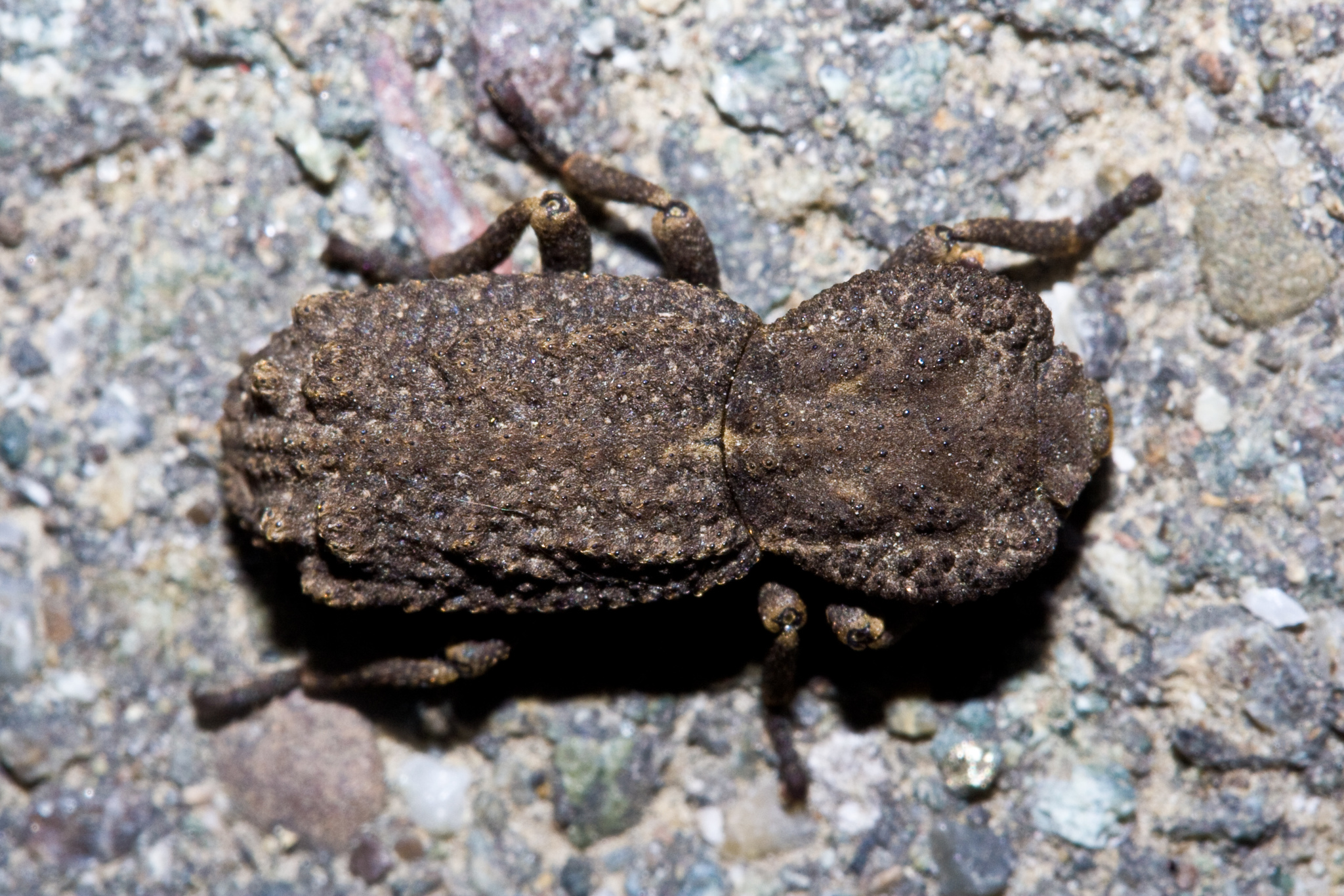
- Adult

Scientific classification
- Domain: Eukaryota
- Kingdom: Animalia
- Phylum: Arthropoda
- Class: Insecta
- Order: Coleoptera
- Suborder: Polyphaga
- Infraorder: Cucujiformia
- Family: Zopheridae
- Genus: Nosoderma
- Species: N. plicatum

Binomial name
- Nosoderma plicatum (LeConte, 1859)

Synonyms
- Phloeodes plicatus (LeConte, 1859)

= Nosoderma plicatum =

Species of beetle

Nosoderma plicatum, formerly classified as Phloeodes plicatus, is a species of beetle in the family Zopheridae. Its generic combination has changed numerous times in modern papers.
