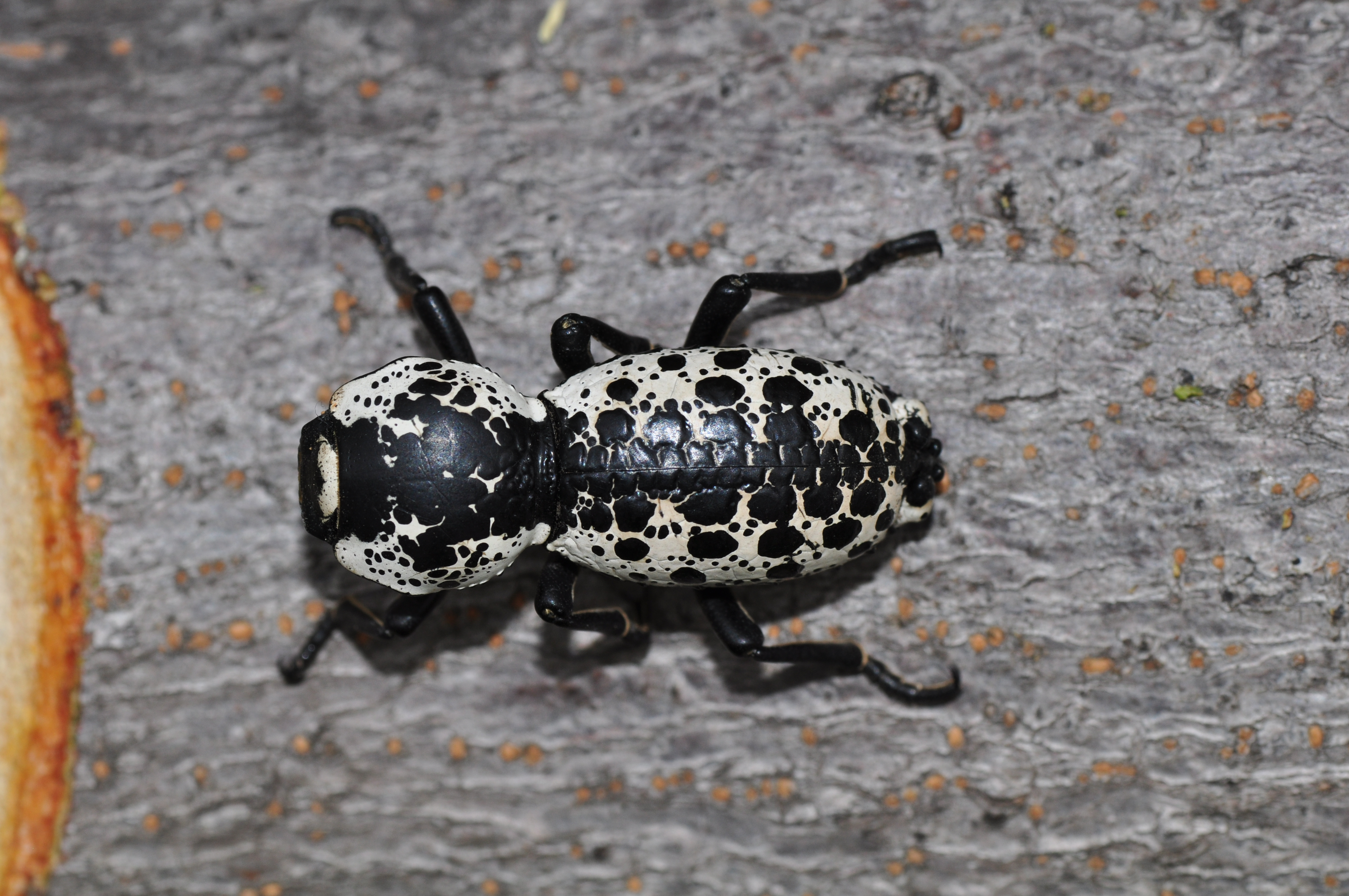

Scientific classification
- Kingdom: Animalia
- Phylum: Arthropoda
- Class: Insecta
- Order: Coleoptera
- Suborder: Polyphaga
- Infraorder: Cucujiformia
- Family: Zopheridae
- Subfamily: Zopherinae
- Genus: Zopherus
- Species: Z. nodulosus

Binomial name
- Zopherus nodulosus Solier, 1841

Subspecies
- Zopherus nodulosus haldemani, Zopherus nodulosus nodulosus

= Zopherus nodulosus =

Species of beetle

Zopherus nodulosus is a species of ironclad beetle in the family Zopheridae. It is found in Central America and North America.

The species name nodulosus refers to the bumps or nodes on the beetle's back.

== Subspecies ==
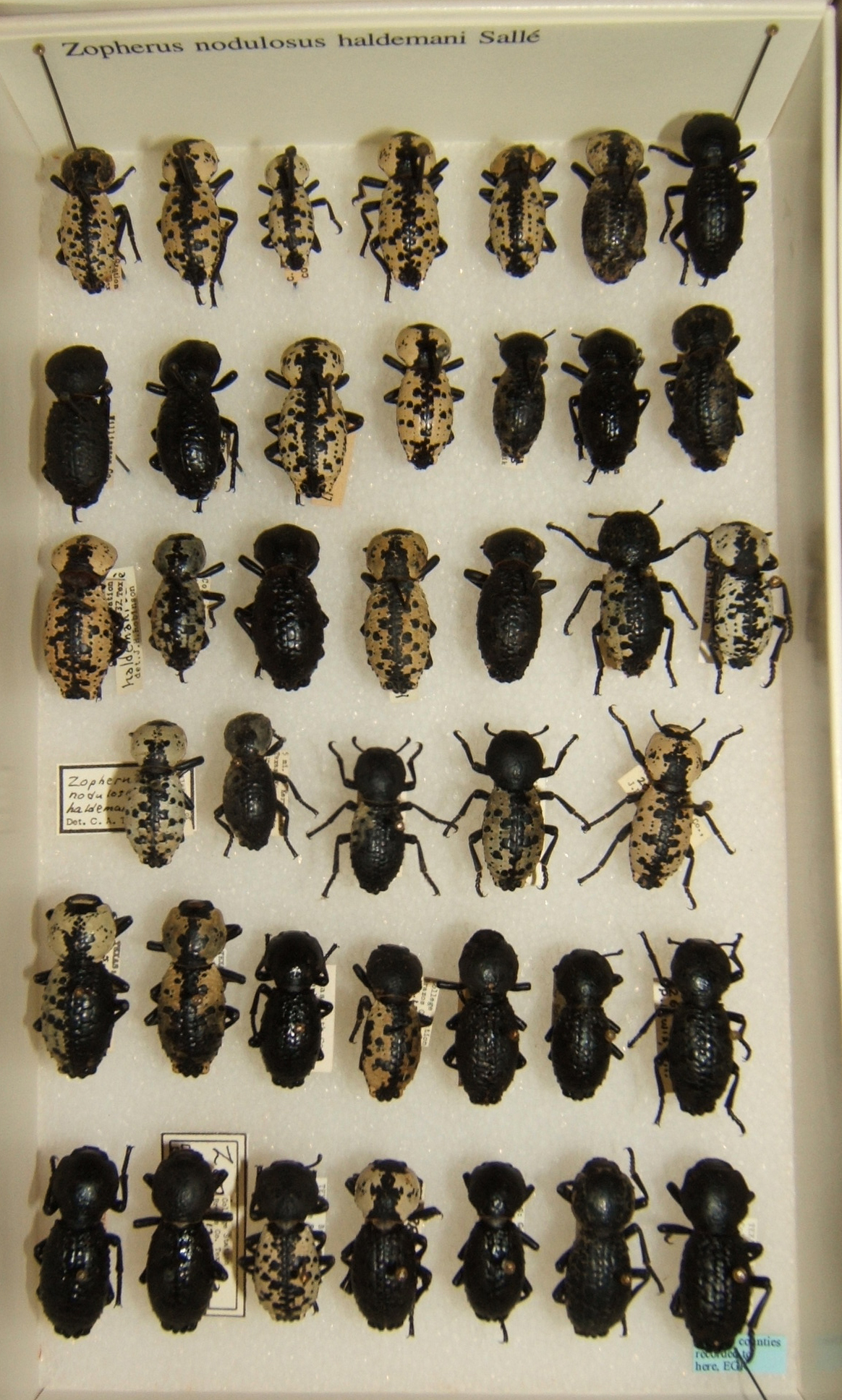
Zopherus nodulosus haldemani pattern variation

=== Z. n. haldemani ===
Z. n. haldemani Horn, 1870, common names Haldeman's ironclad beetle or Texas ironclad beetle, is sometimes treated as a separate species. It can grow between 1.5 and 2 centimetres in length. The body is a blotchy black-and-white pattern, and the legs are fully black. The subspecies name, haldemani, references the Haldeman brothers, Samuel Haldeman and Horace Haldeman, the former a naturalist and philologist, the latter a soldier and one of the first people to concentrate on insect collection in Texas.

They are thought to feed on lichen and dead plant material. Females have been observed laying eggs on American elms, and larvae and pupae have been found in pecan wood, which "apparently serves as the developmental site for this species". They are found in East and Central Texas.

=== Z. n. nodulosus ===
Z. n. nodulosus can grow between 1.4 and 2.8 centimetres in length, and 0.5 to 1.1 cm in width.

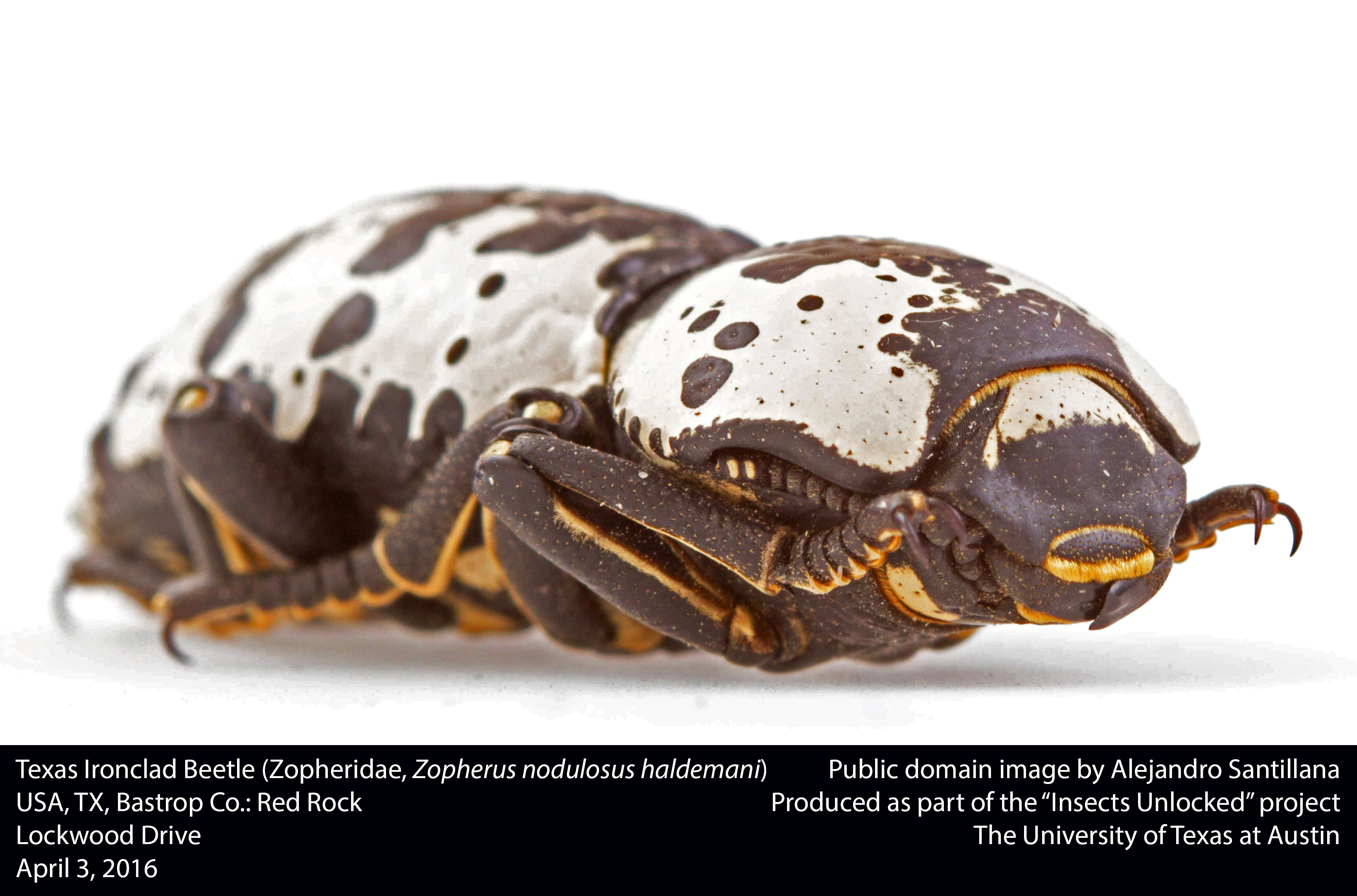
Z. n. haldemani

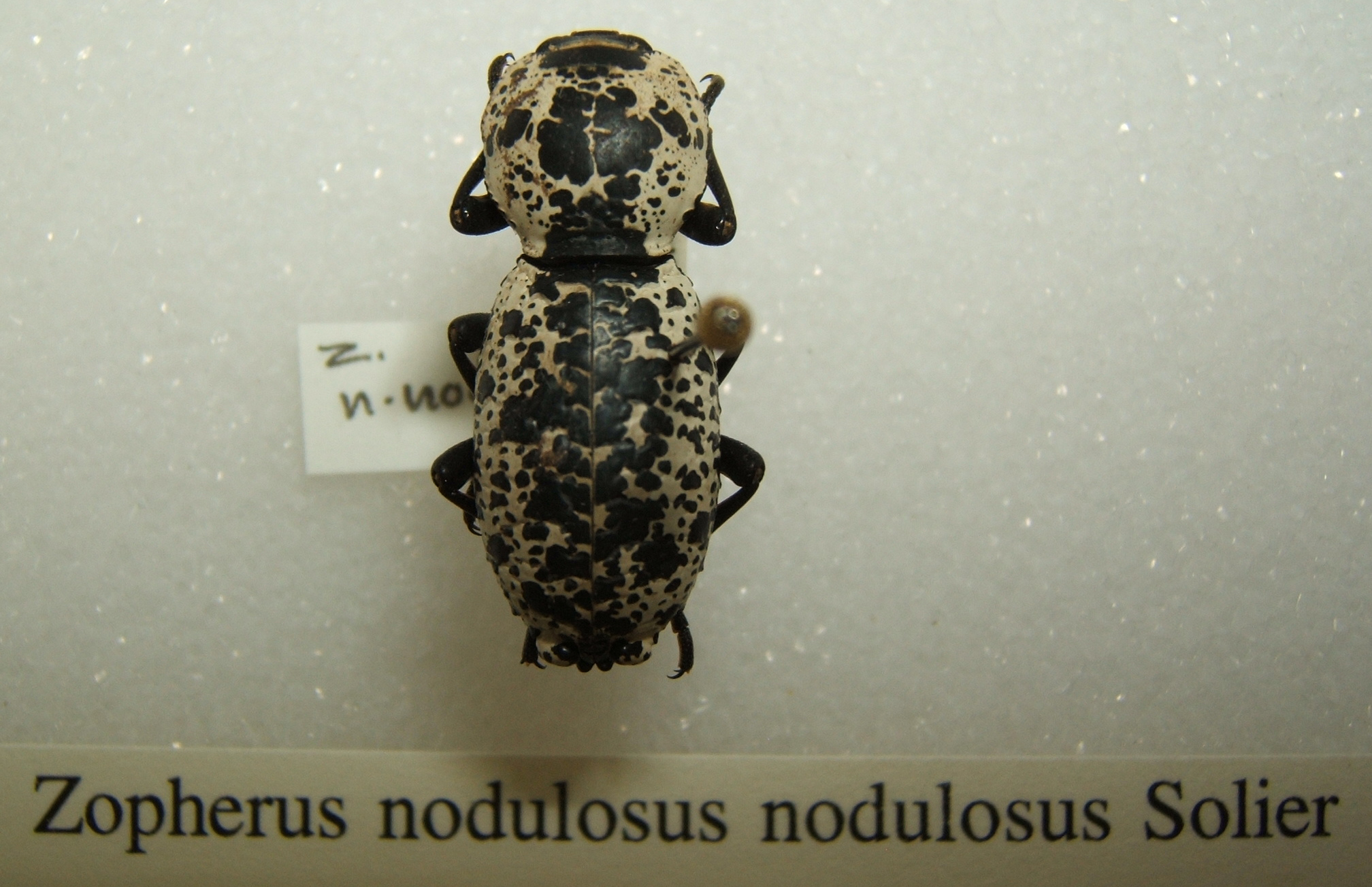
Z. n. nodulosus
