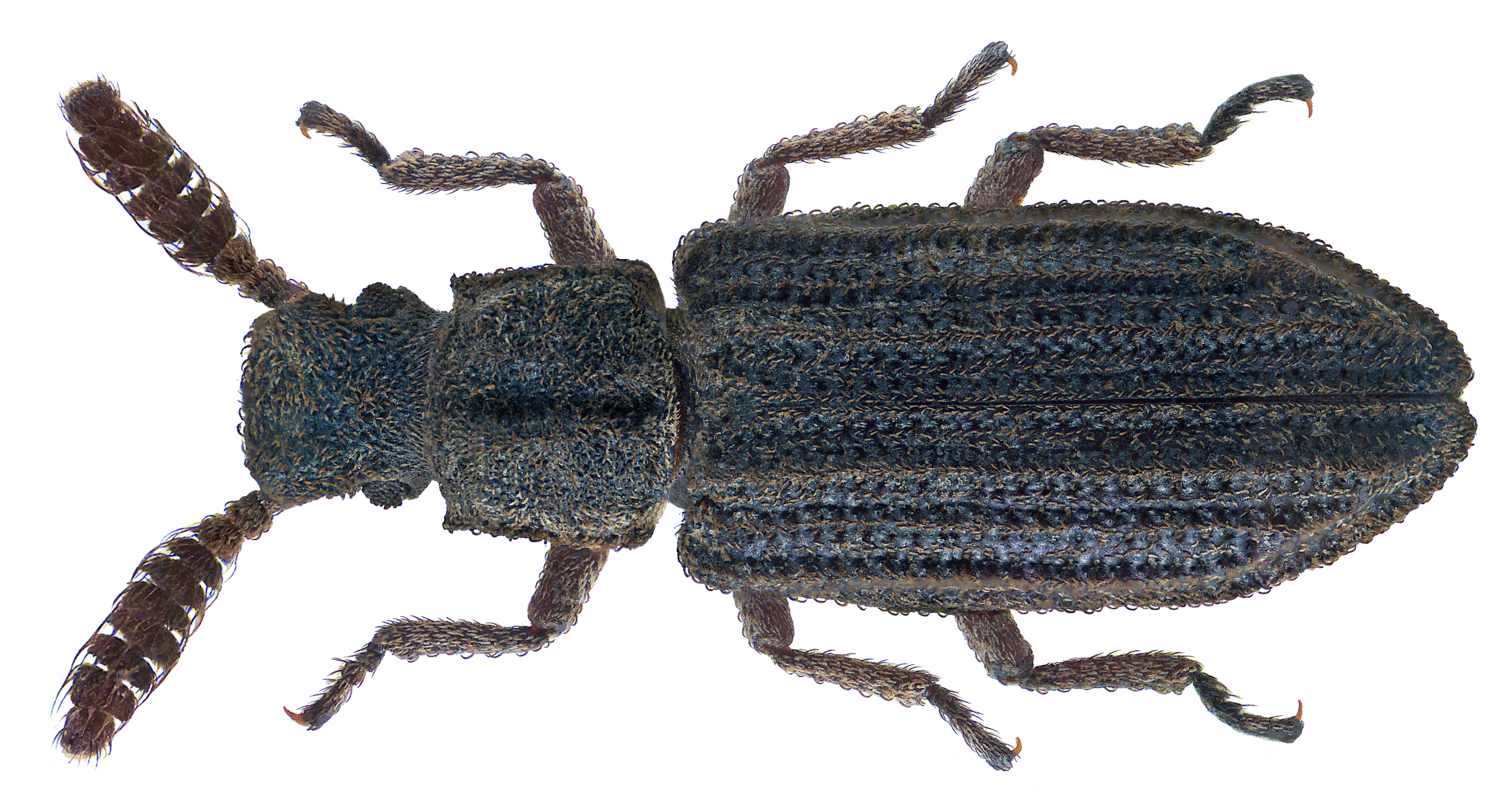
- Orthocerus clavicornis

Scientific classification
- Kingdom: Animalia
- Phylum: Arthropoda
- Class: Insecta
- Order: Coleoptera
- Suborder: Polyphaga
- Infraorder: Cucujiformia
- Family: Zopheridae
- Genus: Orthocerus; Latreille, 1796

= Orthocerus =

Genus of beetles

Orthocerus is a genus of beetles belonging to the family Zopheridae.

The species of this genus are found in Europe.

Species:

- Orthocerus crassicornis (Erichson, 1845)
- Orthocerus clavicornis (Linnaeus, 1758)
