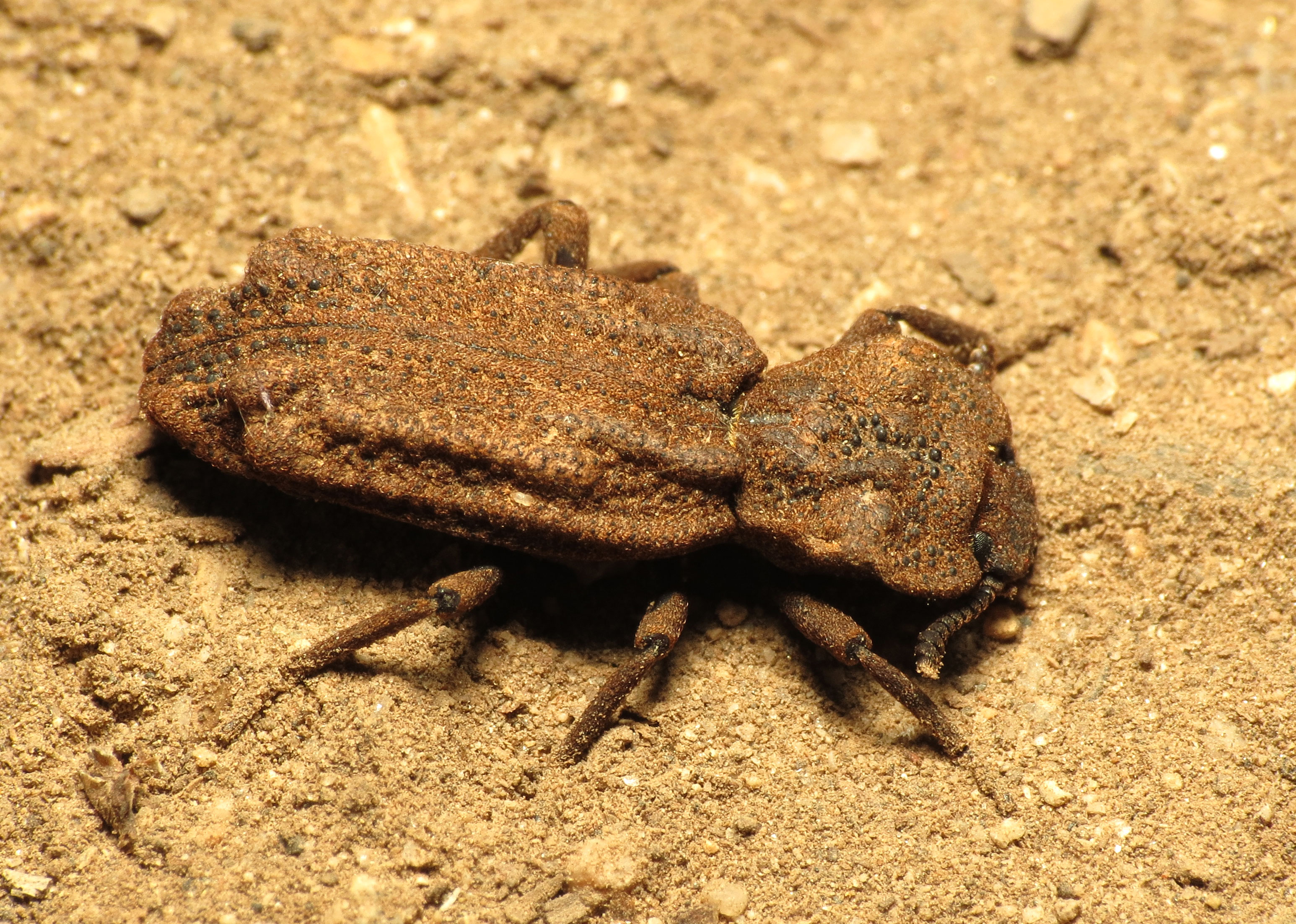
- Phellopsis porcata, adult

Scientific classification
- Kingdom: Animalia
- Phylum: Arthropoda
- Clade: Pancrustacea
- Class: Insecta
- Order: Coleoptera
- Suborder: Polyphaga
- Infraorder: Cucujiformia
- Family: Zopheridae
- Genus: Phellopsis
- Species: P. porcata

Binomial name
- Phellopsis porcata (LeConte, 1853)

= Phellopsis porcata =

Species of beetle

Phellopsis porcata is a beetle of the family Zopheridae. Its range includes parts of North America.

== Biology ==
Both adults and larvae feed on fungi, including Piptoporus betulinus (Polyporales) on birch (Betula papyrifera, B. lenta) and Heterobasidion annosum (Bondarzewiaceae) on balsam fir (Abies balsamea).They have also been reported to feed on fungi on western hemlock (Tsuga heterophylla) and on Lentinus (Polyporaceae). Adults feed on the surface, while larvae burrow into the substrate

When threatened, adult beetles will use thanatosis (feigning death) to avoid predators. This behavior is known from several other species in the Zopherinae.

== Range ==
It is found in the western United States and Canada.
