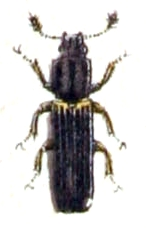

Scientific classification
- Domain: Eukaryota
- Kingdom: Animalia
- Phylum: Arthropoda
- Class: Insecta
- Order: Coleoptera
- Suborder: Polyphaga
- Infraorder: Cucujiformia
- Family: Zopheridae
- Subfamily: Colydiinae
- Genus: Colydium; Fabricius, 1792

= Colydium =

Genus of beetles

Colydium is a genus of cylindrical bark beetles in the family Zopheridae. There are about five described species in Colydium.

== Species ==
- Colydium glabriculum Stephan, 1989
- Colydium lineola Say, 1826
- Colydium nigripenne LeConte, 1863
- Colydium robustum Stephan, 1989
- Colydium thomasi Stephan, 1989
