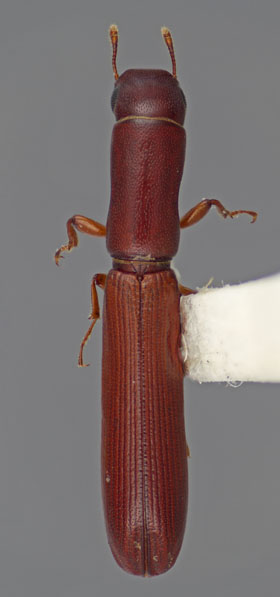
- Nematidium filiforme

Scientific classification
- Kingdom: Animalia
- Phylum: Arthropoda
- Class: Insecta
- Order: Coleoptera
- Suborder: Polyphaga
- Infraorder: Cucujiformia
- Family: Zopheridae
- Subfamily: Colydiinae
- Genus: Nematidium; Erichson, 1845

= Nematidium =

Genus of beetles

Nematidium is a genus of cylindrical bark beetles in the family Zopheridae. There are at least three described species in Nematidium.

== Species ==
These three species belong to the genus Nematidium:

- Nematidium constrictum Dajoz, 1984
- Nematidium filiforme LeConte, 1863
- Nematidium mustela Pascoe, 1863
