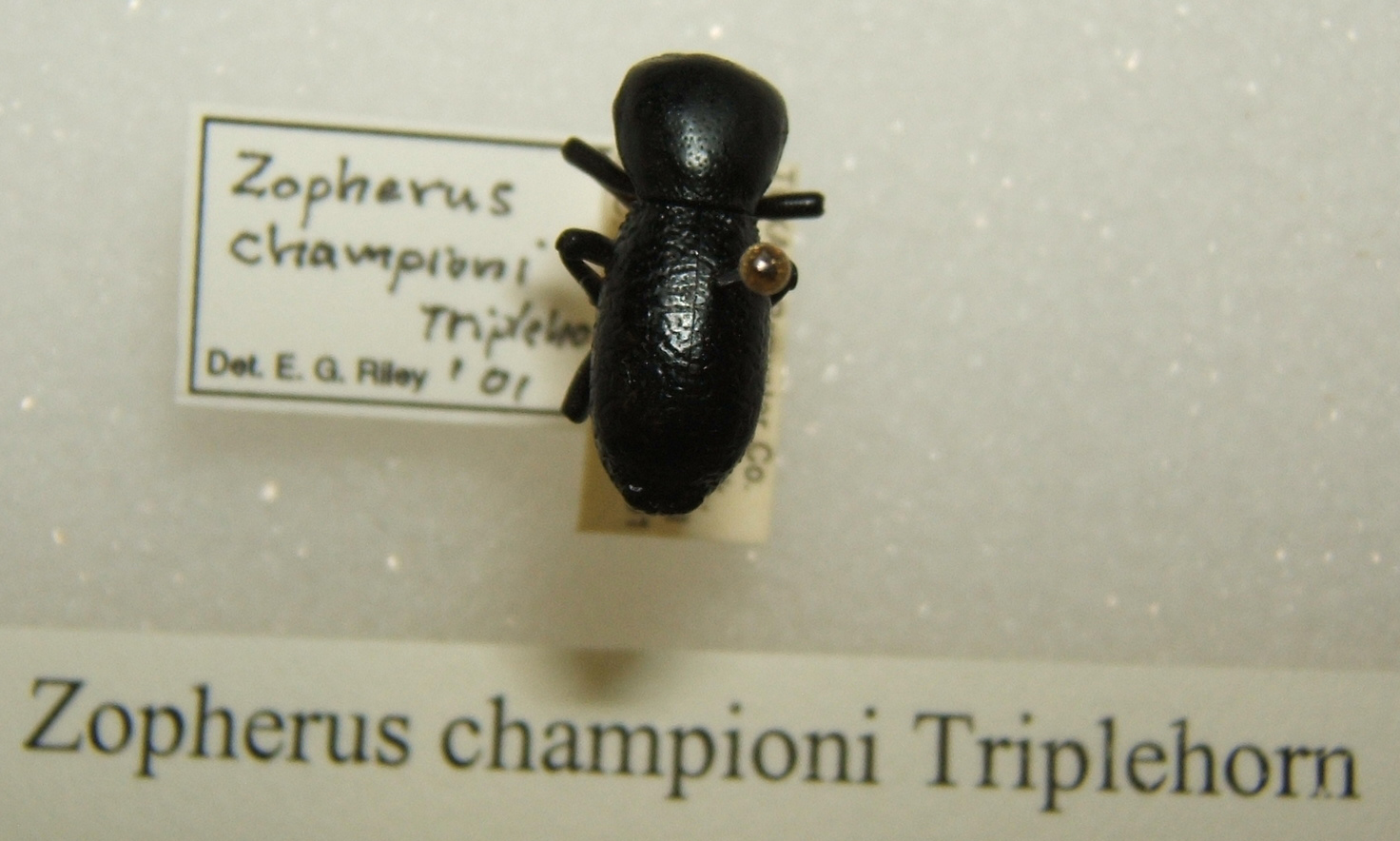
- Zopherus championi

Scientific classification
- Kingdom: Animalia
- Phylum: Arthropoda
- Class: Insecta
- Order: Coleoptera
- Suborder: Polyphaga
- Infraorder: Cucujiformia
- Family: Zopheridae
- Genus: Zopherus
- Species: Z. championi

Binomial name
- Zopherus championi Triplehorn, 1972

= Zopherus championi =

Species of beetle

Zopherus championi is a species of ironclad beetle in the family Zopheridae. It is found in Central America and North America.
