= Monommatini =

Scientific classification
- Domain: Eukaryota
- Kingdom: Animalia
- Phylum: Arthropoda
- Class: Insecta
- Order: Coleoptera
- Suborder: Polyphaga
- Infraorder: Cucujiformia
- Family: Zopheridae
- Subfamily: Zopherinae
- Tribe: Monommatini; Blanchard, 1845

Type genus
- Monomma Klug, 1833

Tribe of beetles

Monommatini is a tribe of beetles known as monommatid beetles. They are in the ironclad beetle family, Zopheridae. There are about 15 genera and 300 described species in Monommatini. They are found worldwide, with the greatest diversity in Madagascar. They are commonly associated with rotting plant matter such as the dry rotting cambium of trees.

== Taxonomy ==
Monommatini has been considered a family (Monommatidae) and subfamily (Monommatinae) in the past, but is now treated as a tribe in the subfamily Zopherinae.
