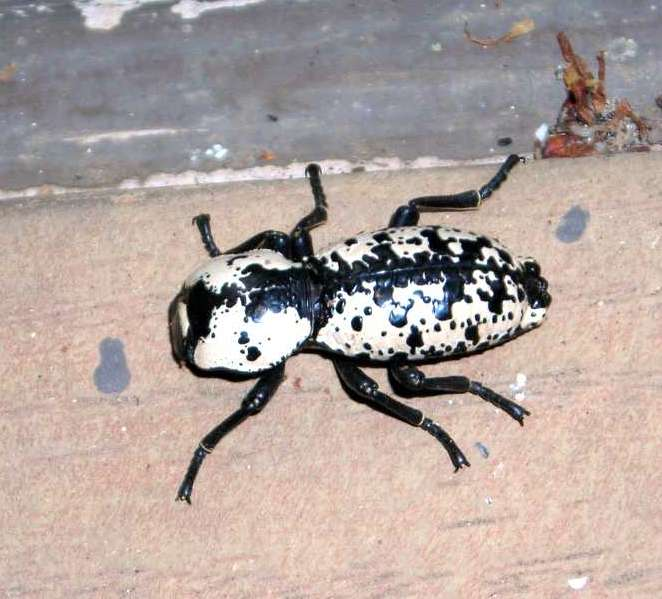
- Ironclad beetle, Zopherus nodulosus haldemani

Scientific classification
- Kingdom: Animalia
- Phylum: Arthropoda
- Clade: Pancrustacea
- Class: Insecta
- Order: Coleoptera
- Suborder: Polyphaga
- Infraorder: Cucujiformia
- Family: Zopheridae
- Subfamily: Zopherinae; Solier, 1834

Tribes
- Latometini Ślipiński and Lawrence, 1999; Monommatini Blanchard, 1845; Phellopsini Ślipiński and Lawrence, 1999; Pycnomerini Erichson, 1845; Usechini Horn, 1867; Zopherini Solier, 1834

= Zopherinae =

Ironclad beetles

Subfamily of beetles

Zopherinae is a subfamily of beetles, commonly known as ironclad beetles. Together with the subfamily Usechinae, they have been treated historically as a family, but have recently been joined by several additional taxa, making the Zopheridae a much larger composite family, and the Zopherinae are now only a small component within it, consisting of seven genera in the tribe Zopherini and one, Phellopsis in its own tribe (Phellopsini).

These beetles likely feed on lichen growing on various trees, and as the common name implies, have one of the hardest of all arthropod exoskeletons; some species have exoskeletons that can withstand up to 3,000 pounds of force. it is almost impossible to drive an insect pin through their bodies without using a small drill to make a hole first, When disturbed, ironclad beetles play dead.

Some species in the genus Zopherus in Mexico are decorated with costume jewelry glued to their bodies, and sold as living brooches, known as ma'kech.

== Selected species ==
- Genus Phellopsis LeConte, 1862

Phellopsis montana Casey, 1907
Phellopsis obcordata (Kirby, 1837)
Phellopsis porcata
Phellopsis robustula Casey, 1907

- Genus Nosoderma Solier, 1841

Nosoderma aequale
Nosoderma diabolicum (LeConte, 1851)
Nosoderma exsculptum
Nosoderma guatemalense
Nosoderma inaequale
Nosoderma plicatum (LeConte, 1859)
Nosoderma sylvaticum
Nosoderma zunilense

- Genus Zopherus Laporte, 1840

Zopherus championi Triplehorn, 1972
Zopherus chilensis
Zopherus concolor LeConte, 1851
Zopherus elegans Horn, 1870
Zopherus gracilis Horn, 1867
Zopherus granicollis Horn, 1885
Zopherus jansoni
Zopherus jourdani
Zopherus laevicollis
Zopherus nervosus
Zopherus nodulosus Solier, 1841
Zopherus opacus Horn, 1867
Zopherus sanctaehelenae (Blaisdell, 1931)
Zopherus tristis LeConte, 1851
Zopherus uteanus (Casey, 1907)
Zopherus xestus Triplehorn, 1972
