= Live insect jewelry =

Jewelry made with insects

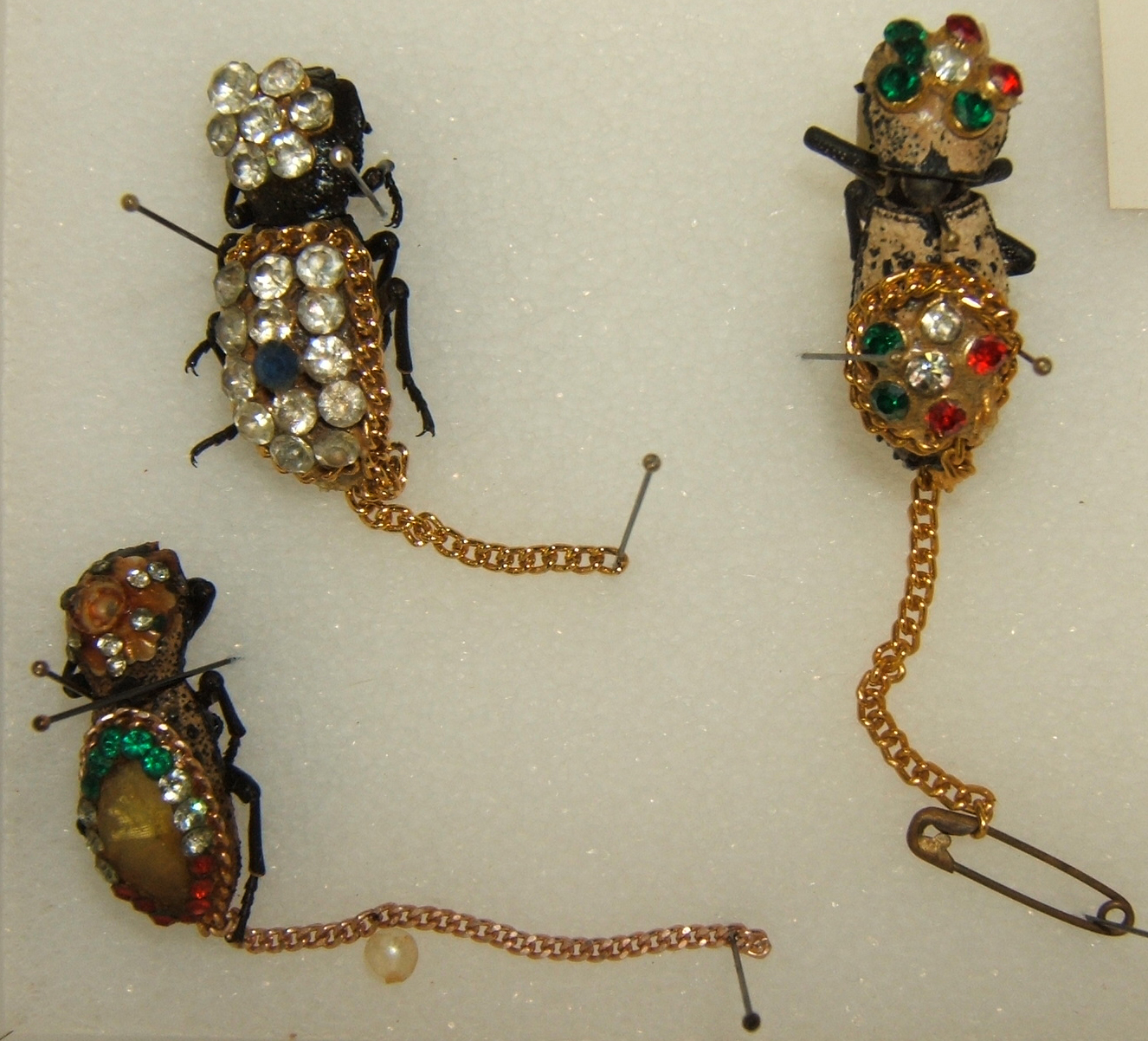
Zopheridae examples of jewelry taken at the Texas A&M University Insect Collection in College Station, Texas

Live insect jewelry refers to jewelry made from living creatures – usually bejeweled oversized insects – which is worn as a fashion accessory. The use of insects as live jewelry has existed for many centuries, with the Egyptians believed to have been the first to have worn insects as jewelry. Ancient Egyptian soldiers commonly wore scarab beetles into battle as the beetles were considered to have supernatural powers of protection against enemies.

== The Mexican maquech ==
Although live jewelry has featured in Mayan cultural traditions for many centuries, it was not until the 1980s that the Mexican maquech made from a subspecies of the zopherus beetle achieved mainstream popularity as live jewelry. The beetle is large, docile, and wingless, and is decorated with gold and semi-precious gemstones and is attached to a decorative safety pin by a chain leash. Marketing for the brooch states that during the Mayan period, women from the Yucatán Peninsula wore maqueches pinned to their chests, over their hearts, to attract and sustain loving relationships.

The tradition is attributed to a story from Mayan folklore though more likely a recent fabrication for tourists considering a purchase. It tells that when a Mayan princess was not permitted to marry a prince from a rival clan whom she loved, she stopped eating and drinking, preferring to die than to live without her lover. In compassion with her plight, a traditional healer with magical powers transformed her into a maquech so that she could spend the rest of her life living as a beautiful brooch on the chest of her lover close to his heart. The current brooch, however, is only worn by women.

A live bejeweled Mexican maquech can trade for as much as US$500 although importation of the beetle to the United States is outlawed.

== The giant Madagascar hissing cockroach ==
In 2006, the giant Madagascar hissing cockroach (or Gromphadorhina portentosa) achieved high profile, short-lived popularity as live jewelry. Fashion designer Jared Gold popularized the "roach brooch" trend with the inclusion of the giant Madagascar hissing cockroach in his 2006 collection. Gold's cockroaches were hand-decorated with Austrian Swarovski crystals, accessorized with a leash set and were sold as "ready to wear" jewelry.

== Response ==
A number of animal rights groups have expressed huge concern in over the use of live jewelry, stating that it is exploitative to the creatures as they "have a similar capacity to feel pain as other more mainstream pets". A 2006, a New York Post story quoted an animal rights spokesman as describing the "roach brooch" as "just the gift for the person who doesn't mind a small animal excreting on them throughout the day." PETA spokesperson Michael McGraw was quoted as saying that the "roach brooch" product "Gives a new, sad meaning to the term 'fashion victim'. Roaches will inherit the Earth, and if it's between the desperate people who wear them and the roaches, our money's on the roaches."

However, proponents of live jewelry have stated that as the wearing of live jewelry is a traditional practice amongst indigenous groups in the Yucatán, the practice would be difficult to cease. Similarly, companies selling live jewelry have stated that with proper care (including storing the insect in a well-heated vivarium) and adequate feeding, many insects used as live jewelry can expect to achieve or exceed the average 2–3 year life span of an insect living in a natural environment.

Following the "roach brooch" featuring on America's Next Top Model, Cycle 89, Black Chandelier, the producer of the Giant Madagascar Hissing Cockroach Brooch, announced that they were temporarily discontinuing the production of "roach brooches" due to "ethical debate" about the product.
