= Nosoderma =

Scientific classification
- Kingdom: Animalia
- Phylum: Arthropoda
- Clade: Pancrustacea
- Class: Insecta
- Order: Coleoptera
- Suborder: Polyphaga
- Infraorder: Cucujiformia
- Family: Zopheridae
- Genus: Nosoderma; Solier, 1841

Species
- 28 species

Synonyms
- Phloeodes pro parte Noserus; Ageonoma; Noserodes; Sesaspis; Verodes

Genus of beetles

Nosoderma is a genus of ironclad beetles from the Americas, with some 28 species including some common and widely distributed species that were earlier placed in the former genus Phloeodes.
