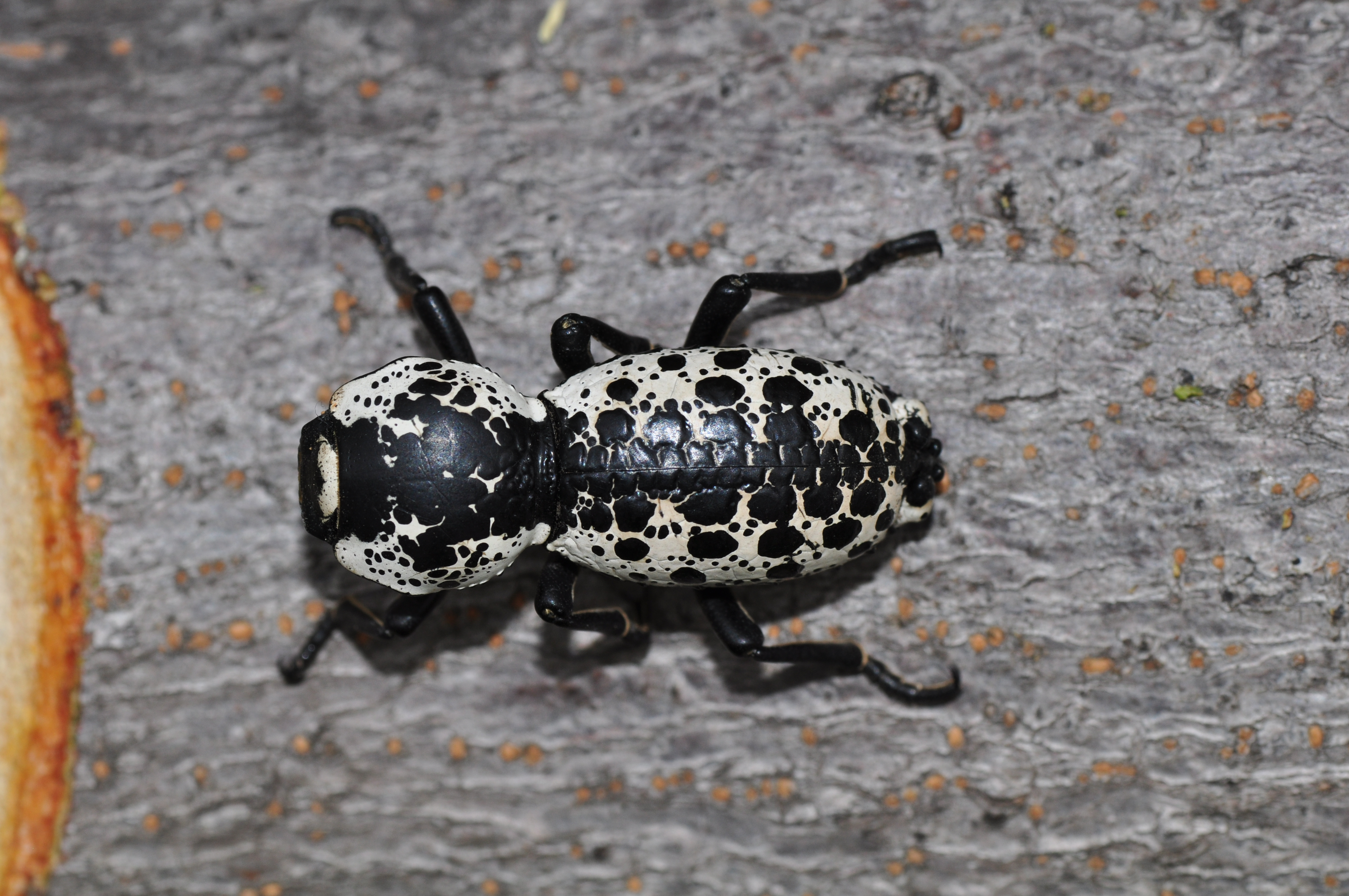
- Ironclad beetle, Zopherus nodulosus (Zopherinae)
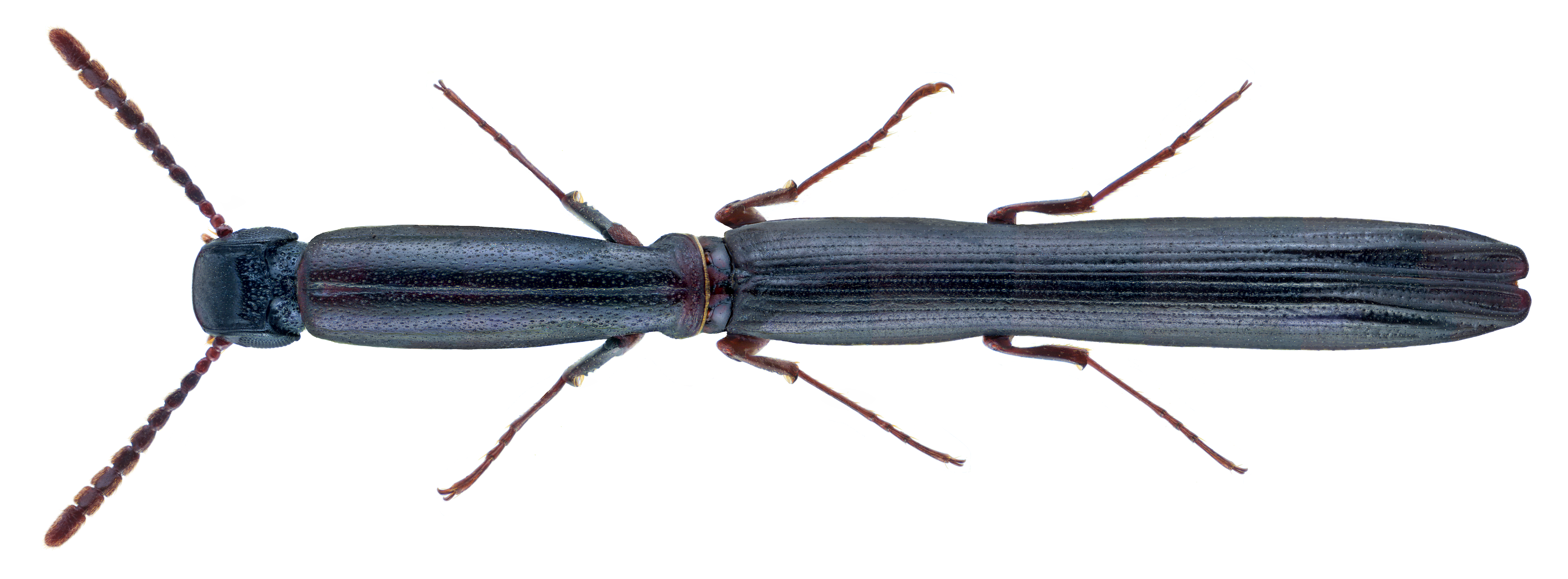
- Aprostoma planifrons (Colydiinae)

Scientific classification
- Kingdom: Animalia
- Phylum: Arthropoda
- Clade: Pancrustacea
- Class: Insecta
- Order: Coleoptera
- Suborder: Polyphaga
- Infraorder: Cucujiformia
- Superfamily: Tenebrionoidea
- Family: Zopheridae; Solier, 1834

Subfamilies
- Colydiinae - cylindrical bark beetles Zopherinae - ironclad beetles

= Zopheridae =

Zopheridae Temporal range: Cenomanian–Recent

Family of beetles

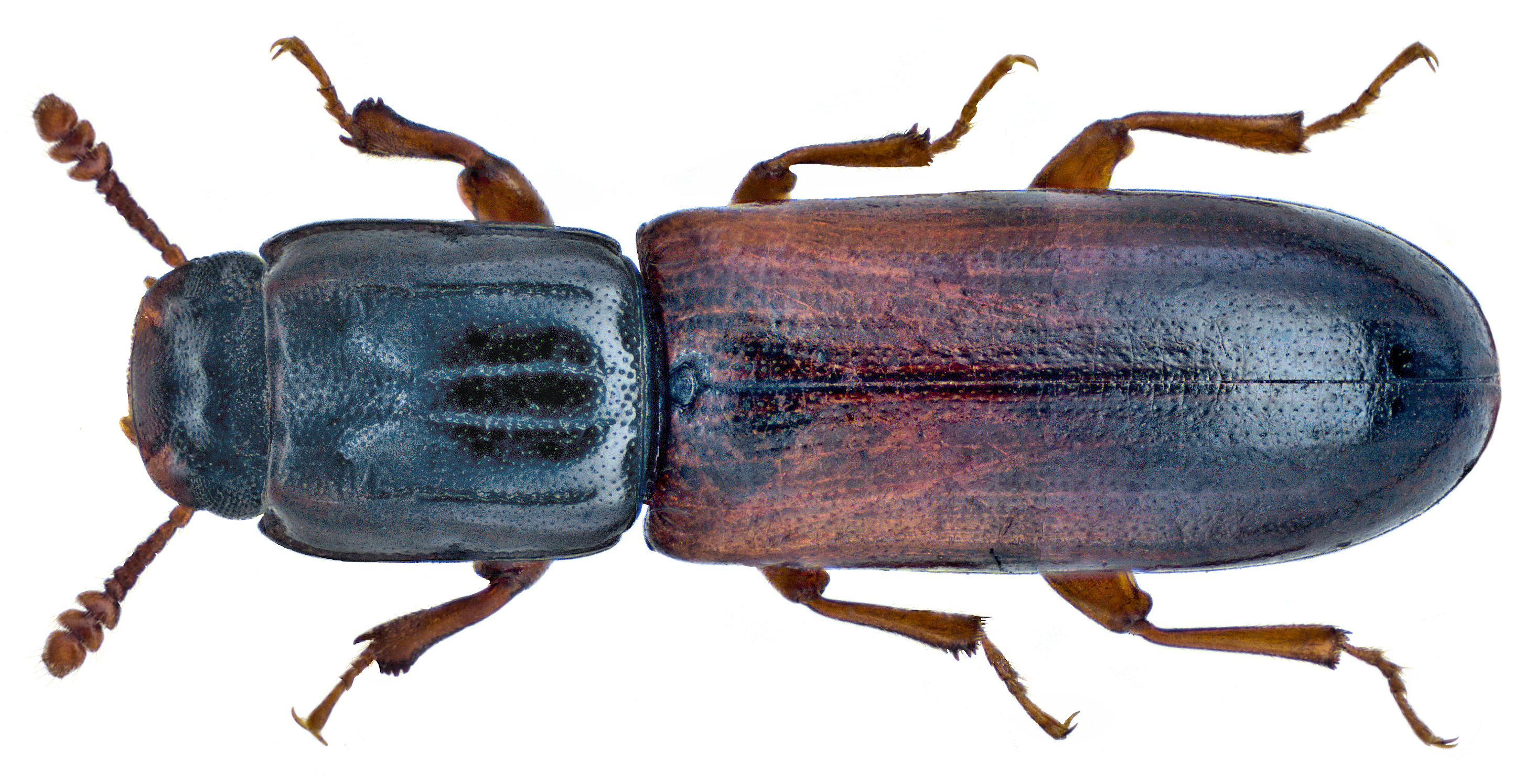
Aulonium ruficorne (Colydiinae)

Zopheridae is a family of beetles belonging to Tenebrionoidea. It has grown considerably in recent years as the members of two other families are now included (Monommatidae and Colydiidae), as subfamilies or (in the former case) even as tribe of subfamily Zopherinae. Some authors accept up to six subfamilies here, while others merge all except the Colydiinae into the Zopherinae.

The family has approximately 190 genera and 1700 species, which are found worldwide. A large number of members of the family feed on rotting wood or fungus associated with rotting wood, though some members of Colydiinae are predatory, or feed on living plant tissue such as roots, stems, flower stalks and fruit.

The oldest fossils of the family are Paleoendeitoma (subfamily Colydiinae, tribe Synchitini) and Cretomysteria from the early Late Cretaceous (Cenomanian) Burmese amber from Myanmar.

== See also ==
- List of subgroups of the order Coleoptera

== Systematics ==
- Colydiinae (subfamily) Erichson, 1842^{i c g b}
  - Acropini (tribe) Sharp, 1894^{c g}
    - Acropis (genus) Burmeister, 1840^{c g}
    - Plagiope Erichson, 1845^{c g}
  - Adimerini Sharp, 1894^{c g}
    - Monoedus Horn, 1882^{i c g b}
  - Colydiini Billberg, 1820^{c g b}
    - Anarmostes Pascoe, 1860^{g}
    - Aulonium Erichson, 1845^{i c g b}
    - Cicones Curtis, 1827^{g}
    - Colydium Fabricius, 1792^{i c g b}
    - Pseudaulonium Reitter, 1877^{c g}
  - Gempylodini Sharp, 1893^{c g}
    - Gempylodes Pascoe, 1863^{c g}
  - Nematidiini G.H. Horn, 1878^{c g}
    - Nematidium Erichson, 1845^{i c g b}
    - Phloeodalis Erichson, 1845^{c g}
  - Ortherocerini Blanchard, 1845^{c g}
    - Orthocerus ^{c g}
  - Rhagoderini G.H. Horn, 1878^{c g}
    - Rhagodera Mannerheim, 1843^{i c g b}
  - Rhopalocerini Reitter, 1911^{c g}
    - Rhopalocerus W. Redtenbacher, 1842^{c g}
  - Synchitini L. Redtenbacher, 1845^{c g}
    - Ablabus Broun, 1880^{g}
    - Bitoma Herbst, 1793^{i c g b}
    - Colobicus Latreille, 1807^{i c g b}
    - Corticus Germar, 1824^{g}
    - Coxelus Dejean, 1821^{i c g b}
    - Diodesma Latreille, 1829^{g}
    - Endophloeus Dejean, 1834^{g}
    - Langelandia Aubé, 1842^{g}
    - Lasconotus Erichson, 1845^{i c g b}
    - Lobogestoria Reitter, 1878^{i c g b}
    - Lyreus Aubé, 1861^{i c g b}
    - Megataphrus Casey, 1890^{i c g b}
    - Paha Dajoz, 1984^{i c g b}
    - Paxillobitoma Lord & Ivie, 2016^{c g}
    - Priolomus Erichson, 1845^{c g}
    - Pristoderus Hope, 1840^{c g}
    - Rechodes Erichson, 1845^{c g}
    - Semicoxelus Alekseev & Pankowski, 2020^{c g}
    - Synchita Hellwig, 1792^{c g}
    - Tarphiomimus Wollaston, 1862^{c g}
    - Tarphius Erichson, 1845^{c g}
    - Trachypholis Erichson, 1845^{c}
    - Xylolaemus Dejean, 1835^{g}
- Zopherinae(subfamily) Solier, 1834^{i c g b}
  - Latometini (tribe) Ślipiński & Lawrence, 1999^{g c}
    - Latometus (genus) Erichson, 1842^{c g}
  - Monommatini Blanchard, 1845^{c g b}
    - Aspathines Champion, 1888^{i c g b}
    - Monomma Klug, 1833^{c g}
  - Phellopsini LeConte, 1862^{i c g b}
    - Phellopsis LeConte, 1862^{i c g b}
  - Pycnomerini Erichson, 1842^{c g b}
    - Pycnomerus Erichson, 1842^{i c g b}
  - Usechini G. H. Horn, 1867^{c g b}
    - Usechus Motschulsky, 1845^{i c g b}
  - Zopherini Solier, 1834^{c g b}
    - Zopherosis A. White, 1859^{c g}
    - Zopherus Laporte, 1840^{i c g b}
  - Zopheromimini Alexeev & Nabhozhenko, 2023^{c g}
    - Zopheromimus Alexeev & Nabozhenko, 2023^{c g}

Data sources: i = ITIS, c = Catalogue of Life, g = GBIF, b = Bugguide.net
