= Phloeonemus catenulatus =

Scientific classification
- Domain: Eukaryota
- Kingdom: Animalia
- Phylum: Arthropoda
- Class: Insecta
- Order: Coleoptera
- Suborder: Polyphaga
- Infraorder: Cucujiformia
- Family: Zopheridae
- Tribe: Synchitini
- Genus: Phloeonemus
- Species: P. catenulatus

Binomial name
- Phloeonemus catenulatus Horn, 1878

Species of beetle

Phloeonemus catenulatus is a species of cylindrical bark beetle in the family Zopheridae. It is found in Central America and North America.
