= Namunaria pacifica =

Scientific classification
- Domain: Eukaryota
- Kingdom: Animalia
- Phylum: Arthropoda
- Class: Insecta
- Order: Coleoptera
- Suborder: Polyphaga
- Infraorder: Cucujiformia
- Family: Zopheridae
- Tribe: Synchitini
- Genus: Namunaria
- Species: N. pacifica

Binomial name
- Namunaria pacifica (Horn, 1878)

Species of beetle

Namunaria pacifica is a species of cylindrical bark beetle in the family Zopheridae. It is found in North America.
