= Megataphrus arizonicus =

Scientific classification
- Domain: Eukaryota
- Kingdom: Animalia
- Phylum: Arthropoda
- Class: Insecta
- Order: Coleoptera
- Suborder: Polyphaga
- Infraorder: Cucujiformia
- Family: Zopheridae
- Tribe: Synchitini
- Genus: Megataphrus
- Species: M. arizonicus

Binomial name
- Megataphrus arizonicus Stephan, 1989

Species of beetle

Megataphrus arizonicus is a species of cylindrical bark beetle in the family Zopheridae. It is found in North America.
