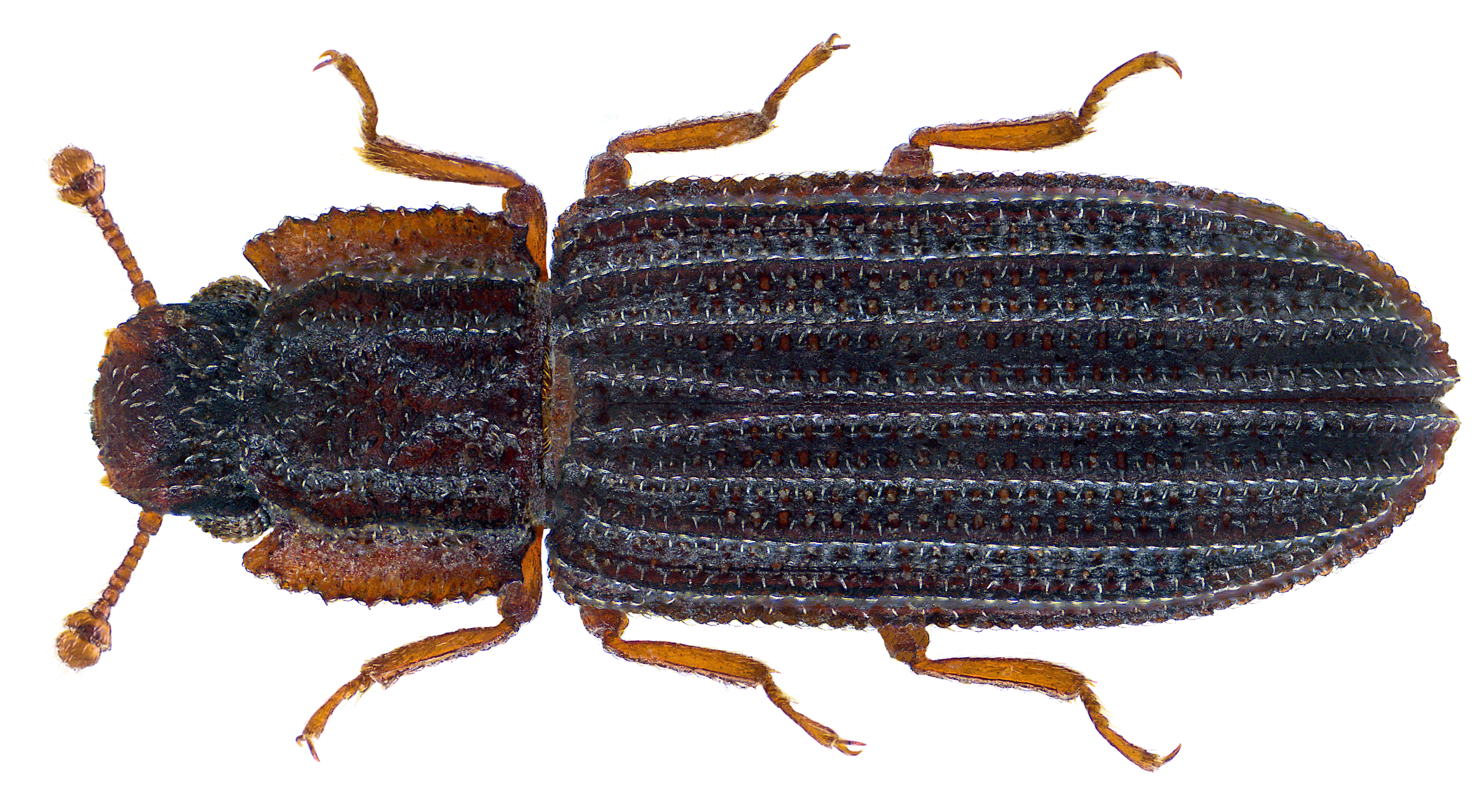

Scientific classification
- Kingdom: Animalia
- Phylum: Arthropoda
- Class: Insecta
- Order: Coleoptera
- Suborder: Polyphaga
- Infraorder: Cucujiformia
- Family: Zopheridae
- Subfamily: Colydiinae
- Tribe: Synchitini
- Genus: Microprius
- Species: M. rufulus

Binomial name
- Microprius rufulus (Motschulsky, 1863)

Synonyms
- Bitoma rufula Motschulsky, 1863; Bitoma crenata ab. rufìpennis Yablokov-Khnzoryan, 1979; Synchitodes frivaldszkyi Reitter, 1877; Synchitodes rufa Reitter, 1881; Bitoma frivaldszkyi Hetschko, 1930; Bitoma rufa Hetschko, 1930; Ditoma frivaldszkyi Reitter, 1922; Ditoma rufa Reitter, 1922; Ditoma rufula Reitter, 1922; Bitoma linearis Wollaston, 1867; Microprius linearis Kocher, 1956; Ditoma opaca Grouvelle, 1892; Microprius opacus Grouvelle, 1908; Microprius confusus Grouvelle, 1908; Microprius raffrayi Grouvelle, 1908; Microprius cubanus Slipinski 1985; Eudesmula california Dajoz 1992

= Microprius rufulus =

Species of beetle

Microprius rufulus is a species of cylindrical bark beetle with a distribution throughout tropical Africa from Cape Verde Islands to Madagascar, northern Africa, Middle East, and South Asia. The species was also introduced to Germany, Cuba, USA, Malta and Cayman Islands.

== Description ==
Specimens are typically about 3.2 mm in length. They be found under bark of trees but are also attracted to light.
