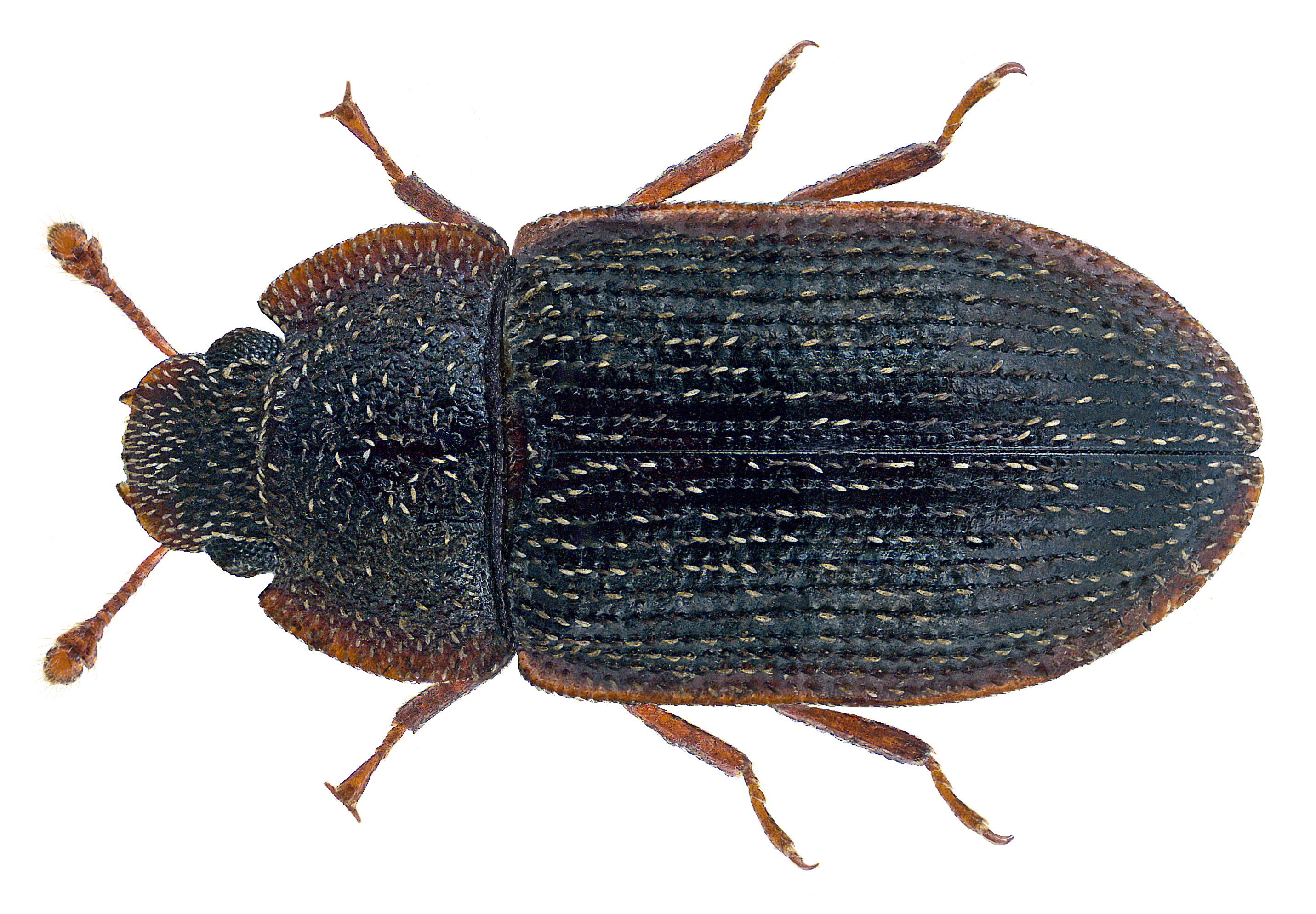

Scientific classification
- Domain: Eukaryota
- Kingdom: Animalia
- Phylum: Arthropoda
- Class: Insecta
- Order: Coleoptera
- Suborder: Polyphaga
- Infraorder: Cucujiformia
- Family: Zopheridae
- Tribe: Synchitini
- Genus: Colobicus
- Species: C. parilis

Binomial name
- Colobicus parilis Pascoe, 1860

= Colobicus parilis =

Species of beetle

Colobicus parilis is a species of cylindrical bark beetle in the family Zopheridae. It is found in Africa, Australia, North America, Oceania, and Southern Asia.
