= Lyreus alleni =

Scientific classification
- Domain: Eukaryota
- Kingdom: Animalia
- Phylum: Arthropoda
- Class: Insecta
- Order: Coleoptera
- Suborder: Polyphaga
- Infraorder: Cucujiformia
- Family: Zopheridae
- Tribe: Synchitini
- Genus: Lyreus
- Species: L. alleni

Binomial name
- Lyreus alleni Ivie & Slipinski, 2001

Species of beetle

Lyreus alleni is a species of cylindrical bark beetle in the family Zopheridae. It is found in North America.
