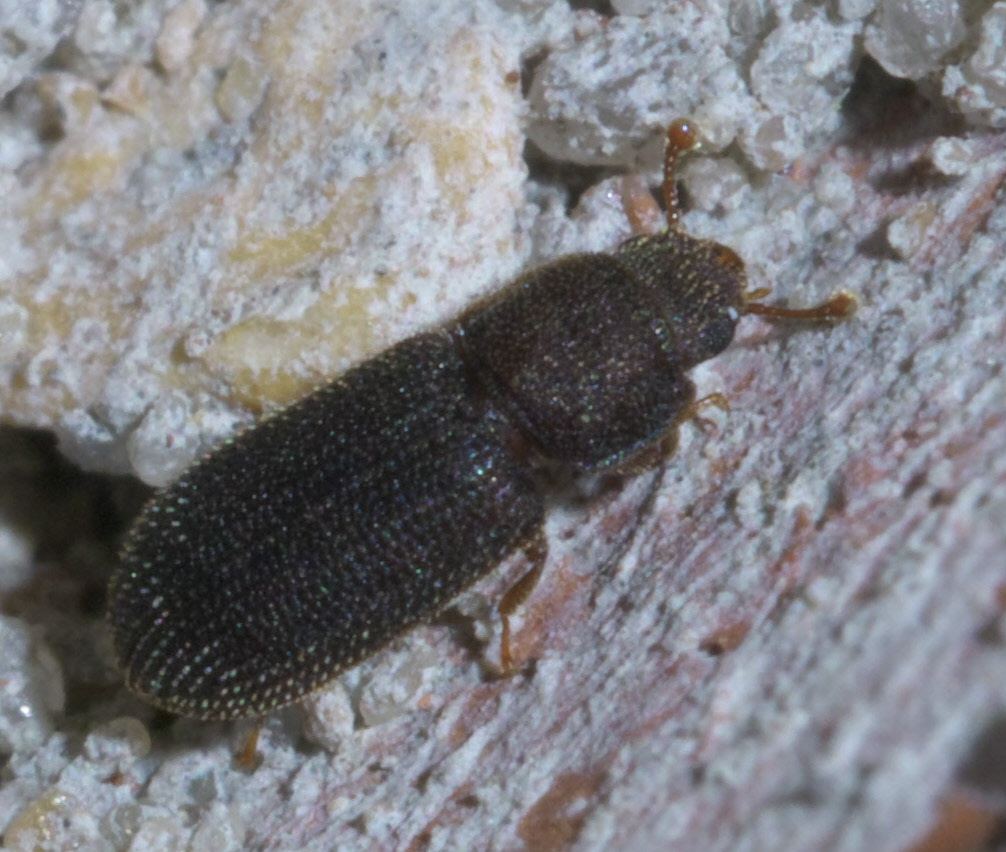

Scientific classification
- Domain: Eukaryota
- Kingdom: Animalia
- Phylum: Arthropoda
- Class: Insecta
- Order: Coleoptera
- Suborder: Polyphaga
- Infraorder: Cucujiformia
- Family: Zopheridae
- Tribe: Synchitini
- Genus: Synchita
- Species: S. fuliginosa

Binomial name
- Synchita fuliginosa Melsheimer, 1846

= Synchita fuliginosa =

Species of beetle

Synchita fuliginosa is a species of cylindrical bark beetle in the family Zopheridae. It is found in North America.

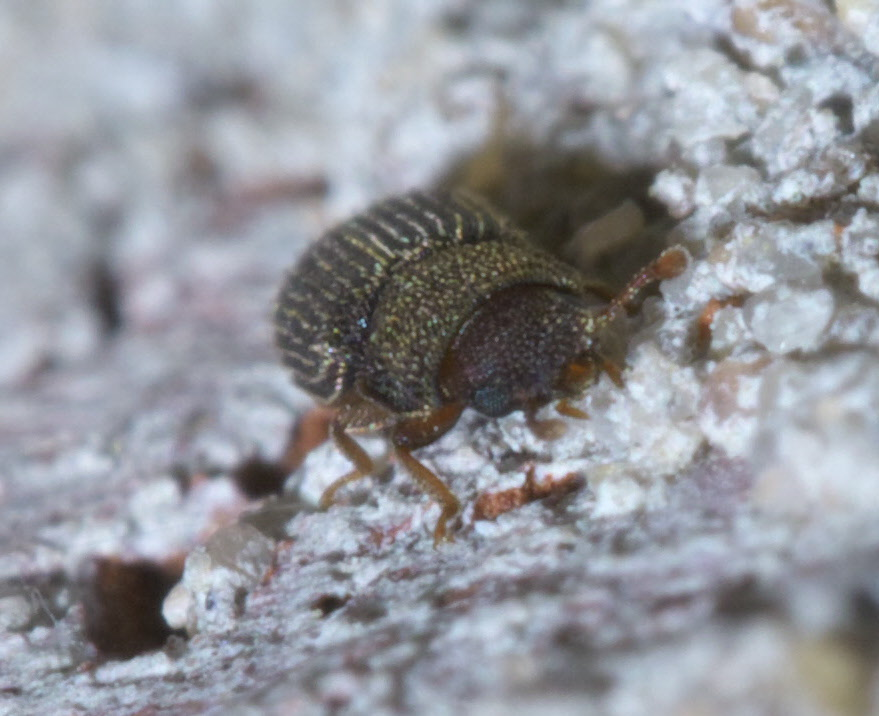
