= Phloeonemus interruptus =

Scientific classification
- Kingdom: Animalia
- Phylum: Arthropoda
- Class: Insecta
- Order: Coleoptera
- Suborder: Polyphaga
- Infraorder: Cucujiformia
- Family: Zopheridae
- Tribe: Synchitini
- Genus: Phloeonemus
- Species: P. interruptus

Binomial name
- Phloeonemus interruptus Reitter, 1877

Species of beetle

Phloeonemus interruptus is a species of cylindrical bark beetle in the family Zopheridae. It is found in Central America and North America.
