= Megataphrus tenuicornis =

Scientific classification
- Kingdom: Animalia
- Phylum: Arthropoda
- Class: Insecta
- Order: Coleoptera
- Suborder: Polyphaga
- Infraorder: Cucujiformia
- Family: Zopheridae
- Tribe: Synchitini
- Genus: Megataphrus
- Species: M. tenuicornis

Binomial name
- Megataphrus tenuicornis Casey, 1890

Species of beetle

Megataphrus tenuicornis is a species of cylindrical bark beetle in the family Zopheridae. It is found in North America.
