= Magnina =

Scientific classification
- Domain: Eukaryota
- Kingdom: Animalia
- Phylum: Arthropoda
- Class: Insecta
- Order: Lepidoptera
- Superfamily: Noctuoidea
- Family: Erebidae
- Tribe: Micronoctuini
- Subtribe: Magnina; Fibiger, 2008

Synonyms
- Magninae Fibiger, 2008

Subtribe of moths

The Magnina are a subtribe of moths of the family Erebidae described by Michael Fibiger in 2008.

== Taxonomy ==
The subtribe was originally described as the subfamily Magninae of the family Micronoctuidae.

== Clades (former tribes) and genera ==
- Magna clade Fibiger, 2008
  - Magna Fibiger, 2008
  - Basalia Fibiger, 2008
  - Palnissa Fibiger, 2008
  - Bilinea Fibiger, 2008
  - Brevis Fibiger, 2008
- Faeculoides clade Fibiger, 2008
  - Rustica Fibiger, 2008
  - Indieditum Fibiger, 2008
  - Faeculoides Fibiger, 2008
