= Aulonium tuberculatum =

Scientific classification
- Domain: Eukaryota
- Kingdom: Animalia
- Phylum: Arthropoda
- Class: Insecta
- Order: Coleoptera
- Suborder: Polyphaga
- Infraorder: Cucujiformia
- Family: Zopheridae
- Tribe: Colydiini
- Genus: Aulonium
- Species: A. tuberculatum

Binomial name
- Aulonium tuberculatum LeConte, 1863

Species of beetle

Aulonium tuberculatum is a species of cylindrical bark beetle in the family Zopheridae. It is found in North America.
