= Lasconotus referendarius =

Scientific classification
- Domain: Eukaryota
- Kingdom: Animalia
- Phylum: Arthropoda
- Class: Insecta
- Order: Coleoptera
- Suborder: Polyphaga
- Infraorder: Cucujiformia
- Family: Zopheridae
- Subfamily: Colydiinae
- Genus: Lasconotus
- Species: L. referendarius

Binomial name
- Lasconotus referendarius Zimmermann, 1869

Species of beetle

Lasconotus referendarius is a species of cylindrical bark beetle in the family Zopheridae. It is found in North America.
