= Lasconotus subcostulatus =

Scientific classification
- Domain: Eukaryota
- Kingdom: Animalia
- Phylum: Arthropoda
- Class: Insecta
- Order: Coleoptera
- Suborder: Polyphaga
- Infraorder: Cucujiformia
- Family: Zopheridae
- Subfamily: Colydiinae
- Genus: Lasconotus
- Species: L. subcostulatus

Binomial name
- Lasconotus subcostulatus Kraus, 1912

Species of beetle

Lasconotus subcostulatus is a species of cylindrical bark beetle in the family Zopheridae. It is found in North America.
