= Aulonium ferrugineum =

Scientific classification
- Domain: Eukaryota
- Kingdom: Animalia
- Phylum: Arthropoda
- Class: Insecta
- Order: Coleoptera
- Suborder: Polyphaga
- Infraorder: Cucujiformia
- Family: Zopheridae
- Tribe: Colydiini
- Genus: Aulonium
- Species: A. ferrugineum

Binomial name
- Aulonium ferrugineum Zimmermann, 1869

Species of beetle

Aulonium ferrugineum is a species of cylindrical bark beetle in the family Zopheridae. It is found in North America.
