= Lasconotus nucleatus =

Scientific classification
- Kingdom: Animalia
- Phylum: Arthropoda
- Class: Insecta
- Order: Coleoptera
- Suborder: Polyphaga
- Infraorder: Cucujiformia
- Family: Zopheridae
- Genus: Lasconotus
- Species: L. nucleatus

Binomial name
- Lasconotus nucleatus Casey, 1890

Species of beetle

Lasconotus nucleatus is a species of cylindrical bark beetle in the family Zopheridae. It is found in North America.
