= Lasconotus laqueatus =

Scientific classification
- Domain: Eukaryota
- Kingdom: Animalia
- Phylum: Arthropoda
- Class: Insecta
- Order: Coleoptera
- Suborder: Polyphaga
- Infraorder: Cucujiformia
- Family: Zopheridae
- Genus: Lasconotus
- Species: L. laqueatus

Binomial name
- Lasconotus laqueatus LeConte, 1866

Species of beetle

Lasconotus laqueatus is a species of cylindrical bark beetle in the family Zopheridae. It is found in Central America and North America.
