= Faeculoides =

Scientific classification
- Domain: Eukaryota
- Kingdom: Animalia
- Phylum: Arthropoda
- Class: Insecta
- Order: Lepidoptera
- Superfamily: Noctuoidea
- Family: Erebidae
- Subtribe: Magnina
- Genus: Faeculoides; Fibiger, 2008

Synonyms
- Faecula Fibiger, 2008 (non Slipinski & Lawrence, 1997: preoccupied)

Genus of moths

Faeculoides is a genus of moths of the family Erebidae first described by Michael Fibiger in 2008. Despite containing some long-known species, the genus' distinctness was noted only in 2008.

Initially and briefly, the genus was known as Faecula. That name was earlier given to a genus of cylindrical bark beetles, and the moth genus was soon renamed.

== Species ==
Three species are presently placed here:

- Faeculoides bifusa
- Faeculoides plumbifusa
- Faeculoides leucopis
