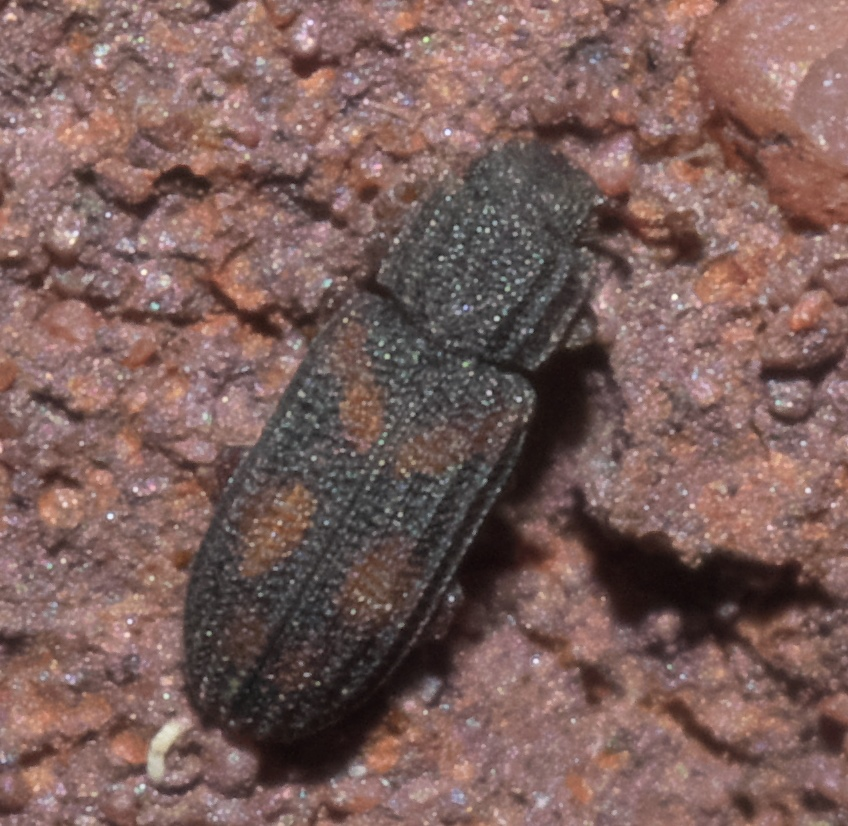

Scientific classification
- Domain: Eukaryota
- Kingdom: Animalia
- Phylum: Arthropoda
- Class: Insecta
- Order: Coleoptera
- Suborder: Polyphaga
- Infraorder: Cucujiformia
- Family: Zopheridae
- Genus: Bitoma
- Species: B. quadriguttata

Binomial name
- Bitoma quadriguttata (Say, 1826)

Synonyms
- Bitoma trinotata Casey, 1924

= Bitoma quadriguttata =

Species of beetle

Bitoma quadriguttata is a species of cylindrical bark beetle in the family Zopheridae. It is found in North America.

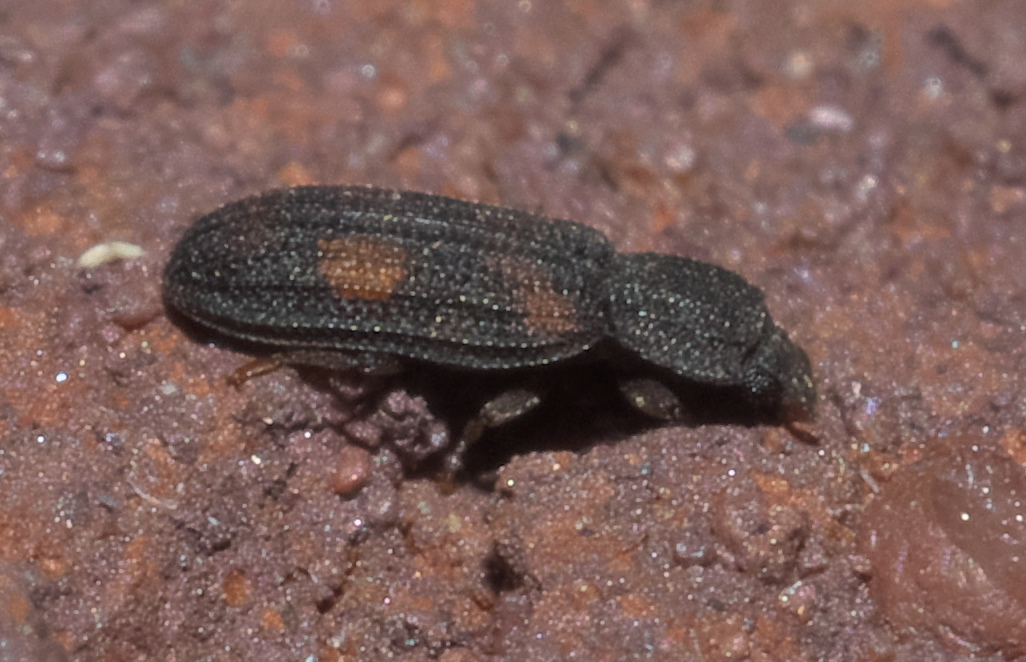

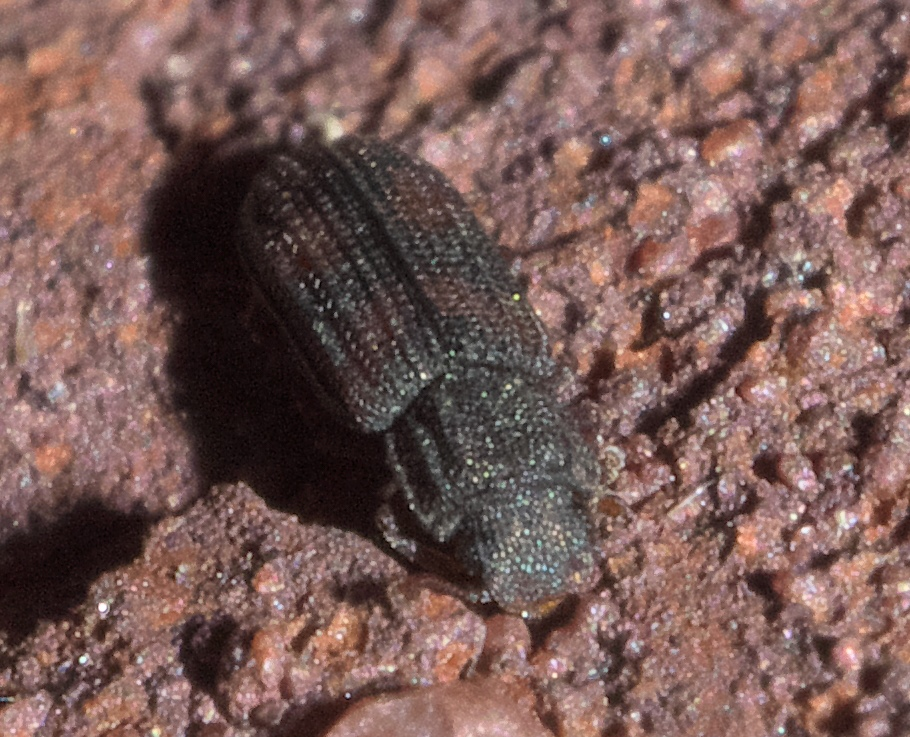
