= Namunaria guttulata =

Scientific classification
- Kingdom: Animalia
- Phylum: Arthropoda
- Clade: Pancrustacea
- Class: Insecta
- Order: Coleoptera
- Suborder: Polyphaga
- Infraorder: Cucujiformia
- Family: Zopheridae
- Genus: Namunaria
- Species: N. guttulata

Binomial name
- Namunaria guttulata (LeConte, 1863)

Species of beetle

Namunaria guttulata is a species of cylindrical bark beetle in the family Zopheridae. It is found in North America.
