= Endeitoma dentata =

Scientific classification
- Domain: Eukaryota
- Kingdom: Animalia
- Phylum: Arthropoda
- Class: Insecta
- Order: Coleoptera
- Suborder: Polyphaga
- Infraorder: Cucujiformia
- Family: Zopheridae
- Genus: Endeitoma
- Species: E. dentata

Binomial name
- Endeitoma dentata (Horn, 1885)

Species of beetle

Endeitoma dentata is a species of cylindrical bark beetle in the family Zopheridae. It is found in North America.
