= Lasconotus vegrandis =

Scientific classification
- Kingdom: Animalia
- Phylum: Arthropoda
- Class: Insecta
- Order: Coleoptera
- Suborder: Polyphaga
- Infraorder: Cucujiformia
- Family: Zopheridae
- Subfamily: Colydiinae
- Genus: Lasconotus
- Species: L. vegrandis

Binomial name
- Lasconotus vegrandis Horn, 1885

Synonyms
- Lasconotus apicalis Casey, 1890; Lasconotus schwarzi Kraus, 1912

Species of beetle

Lasconotus vegrandis is a species of cylindrical bark beetle in the family Zopheridae. It is found in North America.
