= Denophoelus =

Scientific classification
- Domain: Eukaryota
- Kingdom: Animalia
- Phylum: Arthropoda
- Class: Insecta
- Order: Coleoptera
- Suborder: Polyphaga
- Infraorder: Cucujiformia
- Family: Zopheridae
- Tribe: Synchitini
- Genus: Denophoelus; Stephan, 1989
- Species: D. nosodermoides

Binomial name
- Denophoelus nosodermoides (Horn, 1878)

Genus of insects

Denophoelus is a genus of cylindrical bark beetles in the family Zopheridae. There is one described species in Denophoelus, D. nosodermoides.
