= Bitoma neglecta =

Scientific classification
- Domain: Eukaryota
- Kingdom: Animalia
- Phylum: Arthropoda
- Class: Insecta
- Order: Coleoptera
- Suborder: Polyphaga
- Infraorder: Cucujiformia
- Family: Zopheridae
- Subfamily: Colydiinae
- Genus: Bitoma
- Species: B. neglecta

Binomial name
- Bitoma neglecta Stephan, 1989

Species of beetle

Bitoma neglecta is a species of cylindrical bark beetle in the family Zopheridae. It is found in Central America and North America.
