= Cebia rugosa =

Scientific classification
- Kingdom: Animalia
- Phylum: Arthropoda
- Class: Insecta
- Order: Coleoptera
- Suborder: Polyphaga
- Infraorder: Cucujiformia
- Family: Zopheridae
- Genus: Cebia
- Species: C. rugosa

Binomial name
- Cebia rugosa Pascoe, 1863

Species of beetle

Cebia rugosa is a species of cylindrical bark beetle native to India and Sri Lanka.

== Description ==
The body is smaller and flat with average size of 2.5 to 2.9 mm.
