= Monoedus guttatus =

Scientific classification
- Domain: Eukaryota
- Kingdom: Animalia
- Phylum: Arthropoda
- Class: Insecta
- Order: Coleoptera
- Suborder: Polyphaga
- Infraorder: Cucujiformia
- Family: Zopheridae
- Genus: Monoedus
- Species: M. guttatus

Binomial name
- Monoedus guttatus LeConte, 1882

Species of beetle

Monoedus guttatus is a species of cylindrical bark beetle in the family Zopheridae. It is found in the Caribbean Sea and North America.
