= Paha laticollis =

Scientific classification
- Domain: Eukaryota
- Kingdom: Animalia
- Phylum: Arthropoda
- Class: Insecta
- Order: Coleoptera
- Suborder: Polyphaga
- Infraorder: Cucujiformia
- Family: Zopheridae
- Genus: Paha
- Species: P. laticollis

Binomial name
- Paha laticollis (LeConte, 1863)

Synonyms
- Bitoma paradisea Blatchley, 1930

Species of beetle

Paha laticollis is a species of cylindrical bark beetle in the family Zopheridae. It is found in North America.
