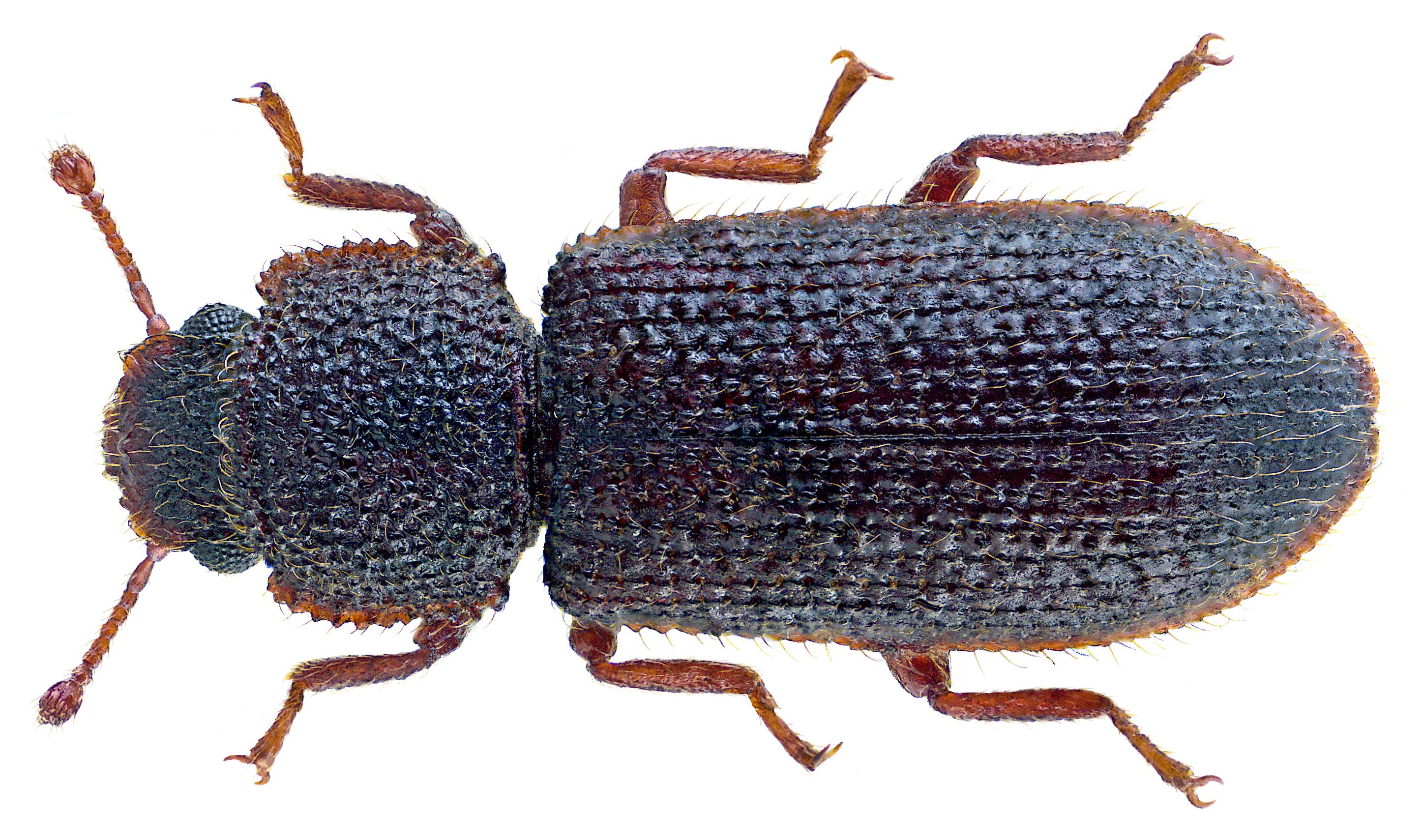

Scientific classification
- Domain: Eukaryota
- Kingdom: Animalia
- Phylum: Arthropoda
- Class: Insecta
- Order: Coleoptera
- Suborder: Polyphaga
- Infraorder: Cucujiformia
- Family: Zopheridae
- Genus: Endeitoma
- Species: E. granulata

Binomial name
- Endeitoma granulata (Say, 1826)

Synonyms
- Asynchita granulata Hinton, 1936; Endeitoma floridana Casey, 1924

= Endeitoma granulata =

Species of beetle

Endeitoma granulata is a species of cylindrical bark beetle in the family Zopheridae. It is found in North America.
