= Lasconotus intricatus =

Scientific classification
- Domain: Eukaryota
- Kingdom: Animalia
- Phylum: Arthropoda
- Class: Insecta
- Order: Coleoptera
- Suborder: Polyphaga
- Infraorder: Cucujiformia
- Family: Zopheridae
- Subfamily: Colydiinae
- Genus: Lasconotus
- Species: L. intricatus

Binomial name
- Lasconotus intricatus Kraus, 1912

Synonyms
- Lasconotus krausi Hatch, 1962

Species of beetle

Lasconotus intricatus is a species of cylindrical bark beetle in the family Zopheridae. It is found in North America.
