= Aulonium longum =

Scientific classification
- Domain: Eukaryota
- Kingdom: Animalia
- Phylum: Arthropoda
- Class: Insecta
- Order: Coleoptera
- Suborder: Polyphaga
- Infraorder: Cucujiformia
- Family: Zopheridae
- Tribe: Colydiini
- Genus: Aulonium
- Species: A. longum

Binomial name
- Aulonium longum LeConte, 1866

Species of beetle

Aulonium longum is a species of cylindrical bark beetle in the family Zopheridae. It is found in North America.
