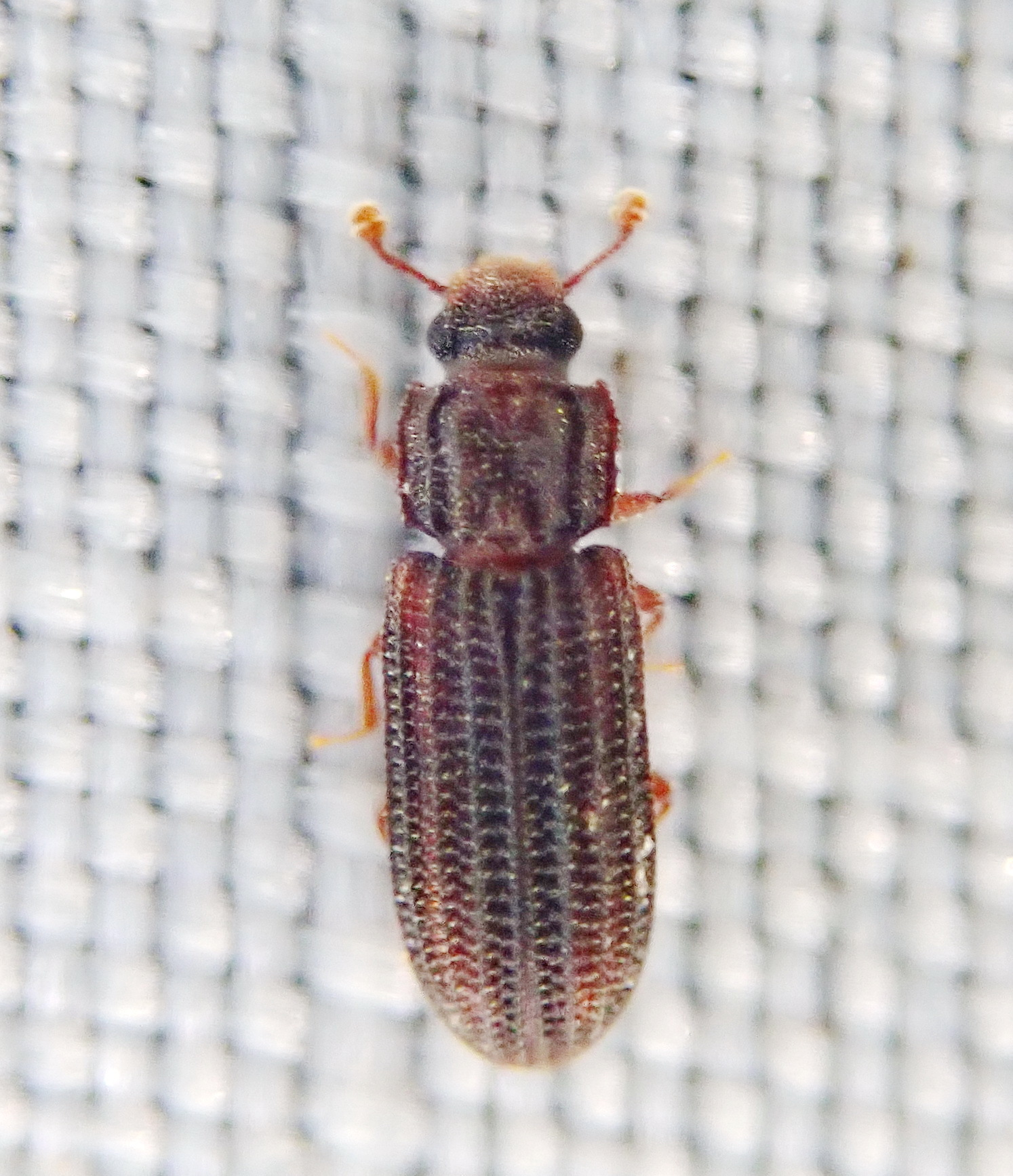
- Bitoma quadricollis, Virginia

Scientific classification
- Kingdom: Animalia
- Phylum: Arthropoda
- Class: Insecta
- Order: Coleoptera
- Suborder: Polyphaga
- Infraorder: Cucujiformia
- Family: Zopheridae
- Subfamily: Colydiinae
- Genus: Bitoma
- Species: B. quadricollis

Binomial name
- Bitoma quadricollis (Horn, 1885)

Synonyms
- Bitoma sobrina Casey, 1924

= Bitoma quadricollis =

Species of beetle

Bitoma quadricollis is a species of cylindrical bark beetle in the family Zopheridae. It is found in North America. Larvae develop on Hypoxylon fungi.
