= Bitoma carinata =

Scientific classification
- Kingdom: Animalia
- Phylum: Arthropoda
- Class: Insecta
- Order: Coleoptera
- Suborder: Polyphaga
- Infraorder: Cucujiformia
- Family: Zopheridae
- Genus: Bitoma
- Species: B. carinata

Binomial name
- Bitoma carinata (LeConte, 1863)

Species of beetle

Bitoma carinata is a species of cylindrical bark beetle in the family Zopheridae. It is found in North America.
