= Bilinea bilineata =

Scientific classification
- Kingdom: Animalia
- Phylum: Arthropoda
- Class: Insecta
- Order: Lepidoptera
- Superfamily: Noctuoidea
- Family: Erebidae
- Genus: Bilinea
- Species: B. bilineata

Binomial name
- Bilinea bilineata (Hampson, 1907)

Synonyms
- Tolpia bilineata Hampson, 1907

Species of moth

Bilinea bilineata is a moth of the family Erebidae first described by George Hampson in 1907. It is known from south-central Sri Lanka.

The species occurs in warm, moist forested mountains. Adults have been found in February, May, August, October and November, suggesting multiple generations per year.

The wingspan is 15–19 mm.
