= Basalia nilgiroides =

Scientific classification
- Domain: Eukaryota
- Kingdom: Animalia
- Phylum: Arthropoda
- Class: Insecta
- Order: Lepidoptera
- Superfamily: Noctuoidea
- Family: Erebidae
- Genus: Basalia
- Species: B. nilgiroides

Binomial name
- Basalia nilgiroides Fibiger, 2008

Species of moth

Basalia nilgiroides is a moth of the family Erebidae first described by Michael Fibiger in 2008. It is known from the Nilgiri Hills of south-central India.

Adults have been recorded in April.

The wingspan is about 13 mm.
