= Eudesma =

Scientific classification
- Kingdom: Animalia
- Phylum: Arthropoda
- Clade: Pancrustacea
- Class: Insecta
- Order: Coleoptera
- Suborder: Polyphaga
- Infraorder: Cucujiformia
- Family: Zopheridae
- Tribe: Synchitini
- Genus: Eudesma; LeConte, 1863
- Species: E. undulata

Binomial name
- Eudesma undulata (Melsheimer, 1846)

Genus of insects

Eudesma is a genus of cylindrical bark beetles in the family Zopheridae. There is one described species in Eudesma, E. undulata.
