= Phloeonemus =

Scientific classification
- Kingdom: Animalia
- Phylum: Arthropoda
- Class: Insecta
- Order: Coleoptera
- Suborder: Polyphaga
- Infraorder: Cucujiformia
- Family: Zopheridae
- Subfamily: Colydiinae
- Tribe: Synchitini
- Genus: Phloeonemus; Erichson, 1845

Genus of beetles

Phloeonemus is a genus of cylindrical bark beetles in the family Zopheridae. There are at least three described species in Phloeonemus.

== Species ==
These three species belong to the genus Phloeonemus:

- Phloeonemus catenulatus Horn, 1878
- Phloeonemus interruptus Reitter, 1877
- Phloeonemus martorelli Fisher
