= Rustica nigrops =

Scientific classification
- Domain: Eukaryota
- Kingdom: Animalia
- Phylum: Arthropoda
- Class: Insecta
- Order: Lepidoptera
- Superfamily: Noctuoidea
- Family: Erebidae
- Genus: Rustica
- Species: R. nigrops

Binomial name
- Rustica nigrops Fibiger, 2008

Species of moth

Rustica nigrops is a moth of the family Erebidae first described by Michael Fibiger in 2008. It is known from the mountains of central Sri Lanka.

The wingspan is 12–14 mm.
