= Bilinea bilineatissima =

Scientific classification
- Domain: Eukaryota
- Kingdom: Animalia
- Phylum: Arthropoda
- Class: Insecta
- Order: Lepidoptera
- Superfamily: Noctuoidea
- Family: Erebidae
- Genus: Bilinea
- Species: B. bilineatissima

Binomial name
- Bilinea bilineatissima Fibiger, 2008

Species of moth

Bilinea bilineatissima is a moth of the family Erebidae first described by Michael Fibiger in 2008. It is known from southern Sri Lanka.

The species occurs in warm, moist forested mountains. Adults have been found from February to November, suggesting many generations per year.

The wingspan is 13–15 mm.
