= Faeculoides bifusa =

Scientific classification
- Domain: Eukaryota
- Kingdom: Animalia
- Phylum: Arthropoda
- Class: Insecta
- Order: Lepidoptera
- Superfamily: Noctuoidea
- Family: Erebidae
- Genus: Faeculoides
- Species: F. bifusa

Binomial name
- Faeculoides bifusa (Fibiger, 2008)

Synonyms
- Faecula bifusa Fibiger, 2008

Species of moth

Faeculoides bifusa is a moth of the family Erebidae first described by Michael Fibiger in 2008. It is known from the mountains of central Sri Lanka.

Adults have been found from March to July, suggesting several generations per year.

The wingspan is 11.5–13 mm.
