= Rustica =

Scientific classification
- Kingdom: Animalia
- Phylum: Arthropoda
- Class: Insecta
- Order: Lepidoptera
- Superfamily: Noctuoidea
- Family: Erebidae
- Subtribe: Magnina
- Genus: Rustica; Fibiger, 2008

Genus of moths

Rustica is a genus of moths of the family Erebidae erected by Michael Fibiger in 2008.

== Species ==
- Rustica pseudouncus Fibiger, 2008
- Rustica nigrops Fibiger, 2008
- Rustica basiprocessus Fibiger, 2008
- Rustica dulcis Fibiger, 2008
- Rustica septemmeri Fibiger, 2008
