= Faeculoides plumbifusa =

Scientific classification
- Kingdom: Animalia
- Phylum: Arthropoda
- Class: Insecta
- Order: Lepidoptera
- Superfamily: Noctuoidea
- Family: Erebidae
- Genus: Faeculoides
- Species: F. plumbifusa

Binomial name
- Faeculoides plumbifusa (Hampson, 1907)

Synonyms
- Tolpia plumbifusa Hampson, 1907; Faecula plumbifusa (Hampson, 1907)

Species of moth

Faeculoides plumbifusa is a moth of the family Erebidae first described by George Hampson in 1907. It is known from the mountains of central Sri Lanka.

Adults have been found in September.

The wingspan is about 11 mm.
