= Indieditum =

Scientific classification
- Domain: Eukaryota
- Kingdom: Animalia
- Phylum: Arthropoda
- Class: Insecta
- Order: Lepidoptera
- Superfamily: Noctuoidea
- Family: Erebidae
- Subtribe: Magnina
- Genus: Indieditum; Fibiger, 2008
- Species: I. subnilgiri

Binomial name
- Indieditum subnilgiri Fibiger, 2008

Genus of moths

Indieditum is a monotypic moth genus of the family Erebidae. Its only species, Indieditum subnilgiri, is known from the Nilgiri Mountains of southern India. Both the genus and the species were first described by Michael Fibiger in 2008.

The wingspan is about 10 mm.
