= Rustica pseudouncus =

Scientific classification
- Domain: Eukaryota
- Kingdom: Animalia
- Phylum: Arthropoda
- Class: Insecta
- Order: Lepidoptera
- Superfamily: Noctuoidea
- Family: Erebidae
- Genus: Rustica
- Species: R. pseudouncus

Binomial name
- Rustica pseudouncus Fibiger, 2008

Species of moth

Rustica pseudouncus is a moth of the family Erebidae first described by Michael Fibiger in 2008. It is known from southern Sri Lanka.

Adults have been found from February to July, suggesting multiple generations per year.

The wingspan is 12–15 mm.
