= Faeculoides leucopis =

Scientific classification
- Kingdom: Animalia
- Phylum: Arthropoda
- Class: Insecta
- Order: Lepidoptera
- Superfamily: Noctuoidea
- Family: Erebidae
- Genus: Faeculoides
- Species: F. leucopis

Binomial name
- Faeculoides leucopis (Hampson, 1907)

Synonyms
- Tolpia leucopis Hampson, 1907; Faecula leucopis (Hampson, 1907)

Species of moth

Faeculoides leucopis is a moth of the family Erebidae first described by George Hampson in 1907. It is known from the mountains of southern India and Sri Lanka.

Adults have been found from May to June and from October to December.

The wingspan is 10–14 mm.
