= Basalia cucullatelloides =

Scientific classification
- Domain: Eukaryota
- Kingdom: Animalia
- Phylum: Arthropoda
- Class: Insecta
- Order: Lepidoptera
- Superfamily: Noctuoidea
- Family: Erebidae
- Genus: Basalia
- Species: B. cucullatelloides

Binomial name
- Basalia cucullatelloides Fibiger, 2008

Species of moth

Basalia cucullatelloides is a moth of the family Erebidae first described by Michael Fibiger in 2008. It is known from south-central India.

Adults have been recorded in September.

The wingspan is 12–15 mm.
