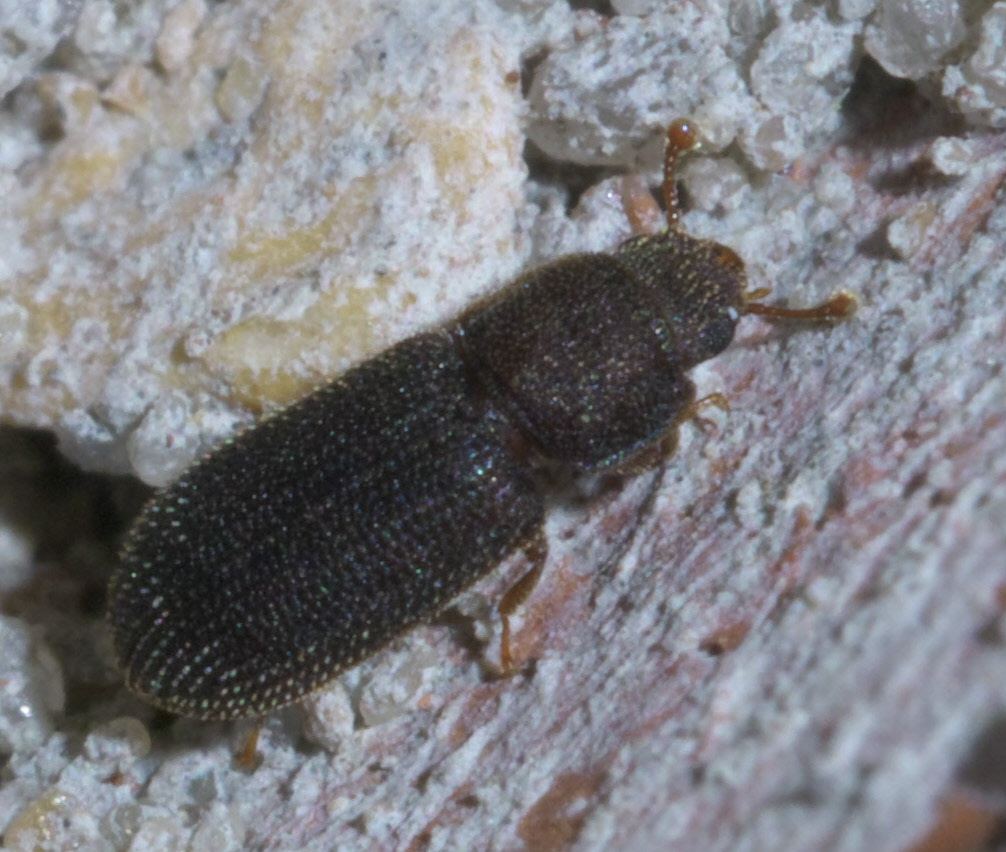
- Synchita fuliginosa

Scientific classification
- Domain: Eukaryota
- Kingdom: Animalia
- Phylum: Arthropoda
- Class: Insecta
- Order: Coleoptera
- Suborder: Polyphaga
- Infraorder: Cucujiformia
- Family: Zopheridae
- Subfamily: Colydiinae
- Tribe: Synchitini
- Genus: Synchita; Hellwig, 1792

= Synchita =

Genus of beetles

Synchita is a genus of cylindrical bark beetles in the family Zopheridae. There are about 20 described species in Synchita. The genus was first described in 1792 by Johann Christian Ludwig Hellwig.

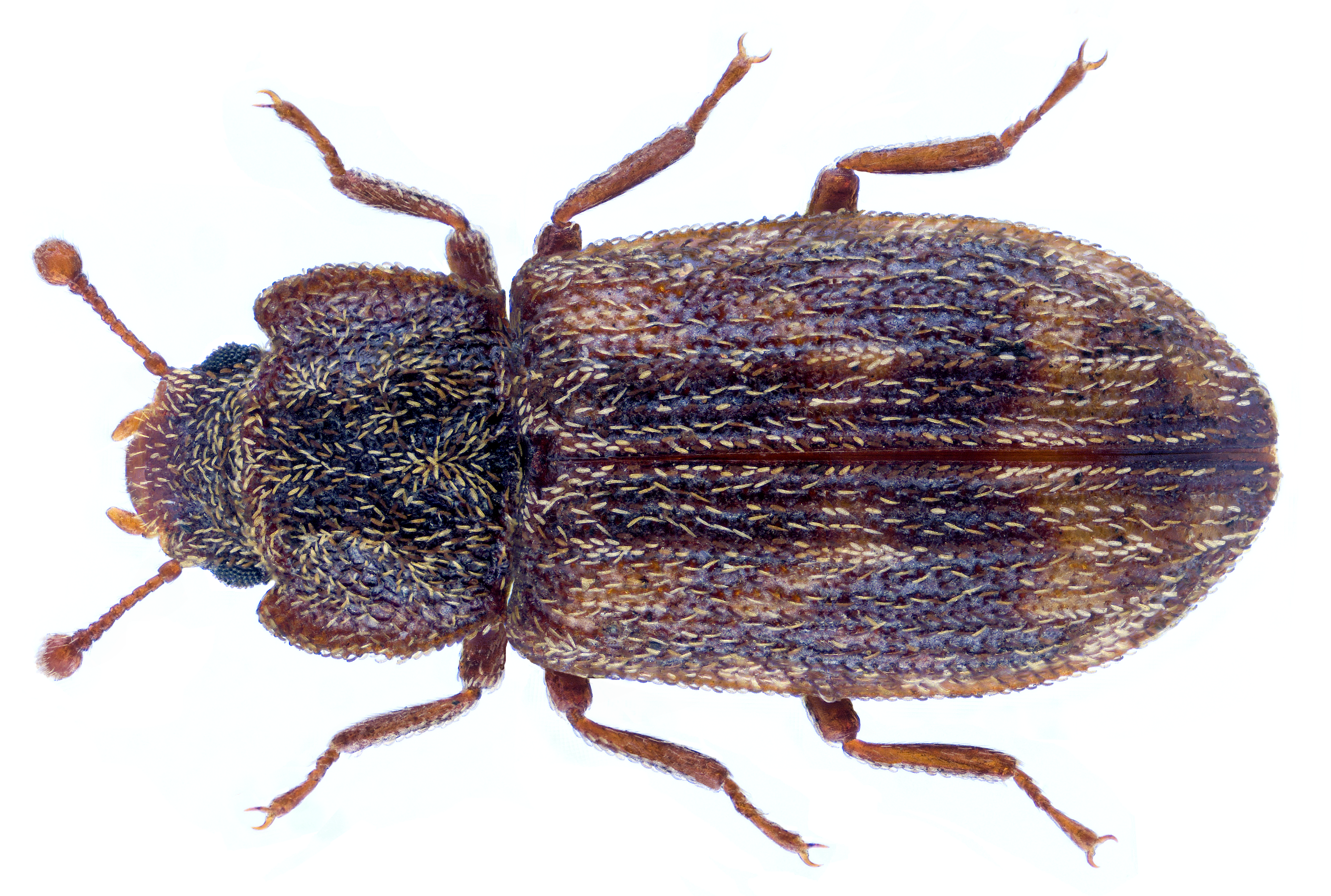
Synchita variegata

== Species ==
These species belong to the genus Synchita:

- Synchita amoena (Fairmaire, 1850)
- Synchita dubia Hinton
- Synchita exilis (Grouvelle, 1898)
- Synchita fallax Schuh, 1998
- Synchita floridana Casey
- Synchita fuliginosa Melsheimer, 1846
- Synchita grouvellei
- Synchita humeralis (Fabricius, 1792)
- Synchita lecontei
- Synchita mediolanensis A.Villa & G.B.Villa, 1833
- Synchita multimaculata (Grouvelle, 1902
- Synchita nigripennis LeConte, 1863
- Synchita obscura Horn 1885
- Synchita parvula Guérin-Méneville 1844
- Synchita picta Erichson, 1845
- Synchita pauxilla (Pascoe, 1863
- Synchita separanda (Reitter, 1882)
- Synchita striatopunctata (Guérin-Méneville 1844)
- Synchita undata Guérin-Méneville, 1844
- Synchita variegata Hellwig, 1792
