= Lyreus =

Scientific classification
- Domain: Eukaryota
- Kingdom: Animalia
- Phylum: Arthropoda
- Class: Insecta
- Order: Coleoptera
- Suborder: Polyphaga
- Infraorder: Cucujiformia
- Family: Zopheridae
- Subfamily: Colydiinae
- Tribe: Synchitini
- Genus: Lyreus; Aubé, 1861

Genus of beetles

Lyreus is a genus of cylindrical bark beetles in the family Zopheridae. There are at least three described species in Lyreus.

== Species ==
These three species belong to the genus Lyreus:

- Lyreus alleni Ivie & Slipinski, 2001
- Lyreus septemstriatus Fancello & Leo, 1991
- Lyreus subterraneus Aubé, 1861
