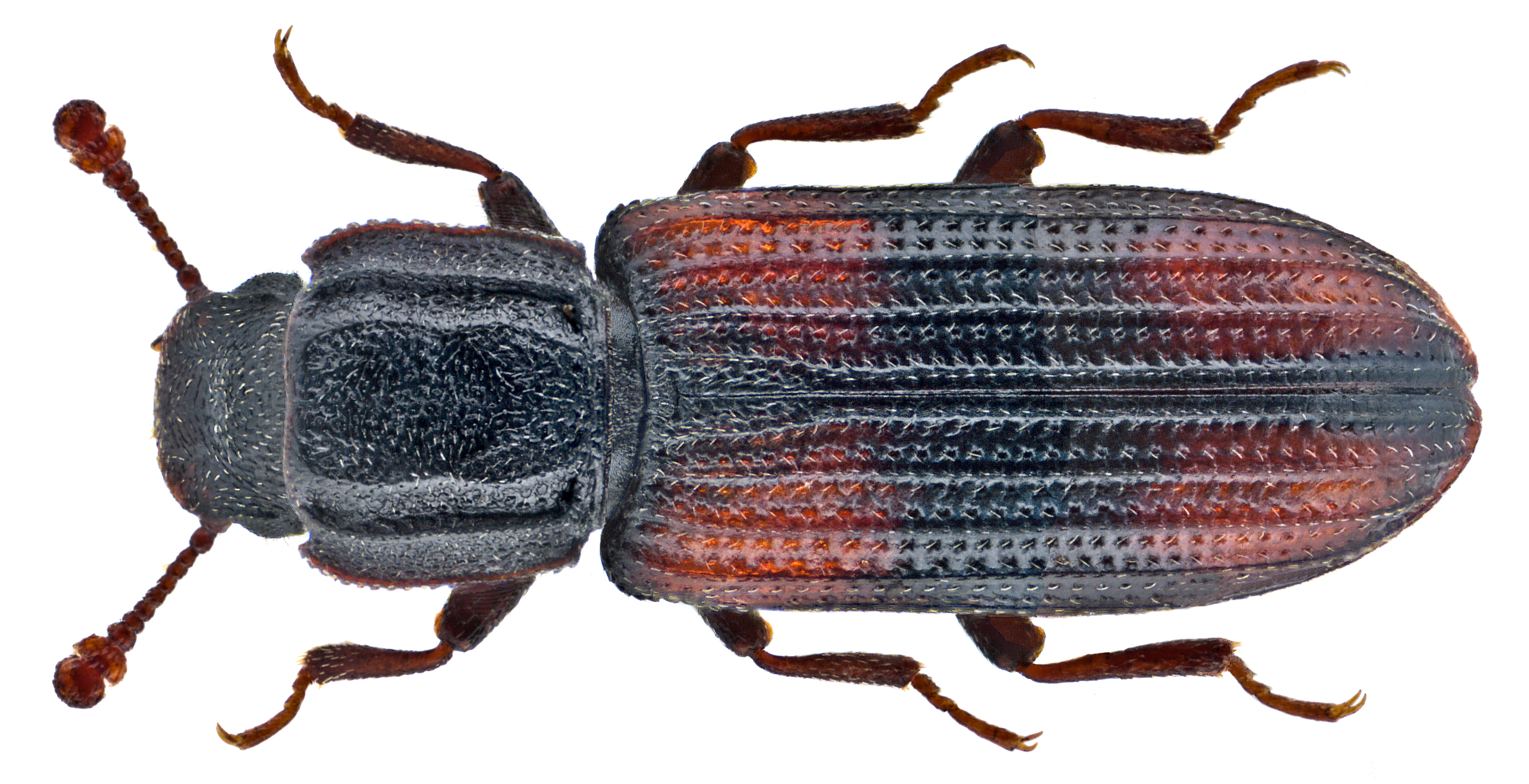

Scientific classification
- Domain: Eukaryota
- Kingdom: Animalia
- Phylum: Arthropoda
- Class: Insecta
- Order: Coleoptera
- Suborder: Polyphaga
- Infraorder: Cucujiformia
- Family: Zopheridae
- Genus: Bitoma
- Species: B. crenata

Binomial name
- Bitoma crenata (Fabricius, 1775)

= Bitoma crenata =

Species of beetle

Bitoma crenata is a species of cylindrical bark beetle in the family Zopheridae. It is found in North America and Europe.

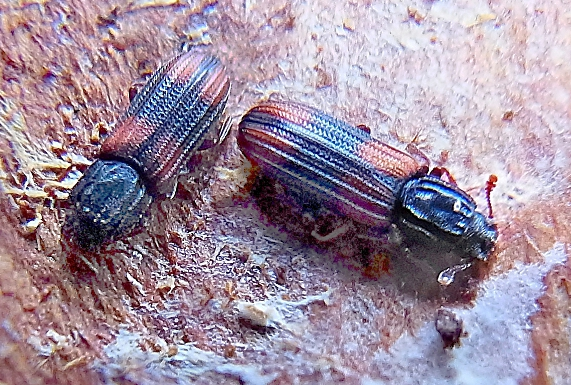

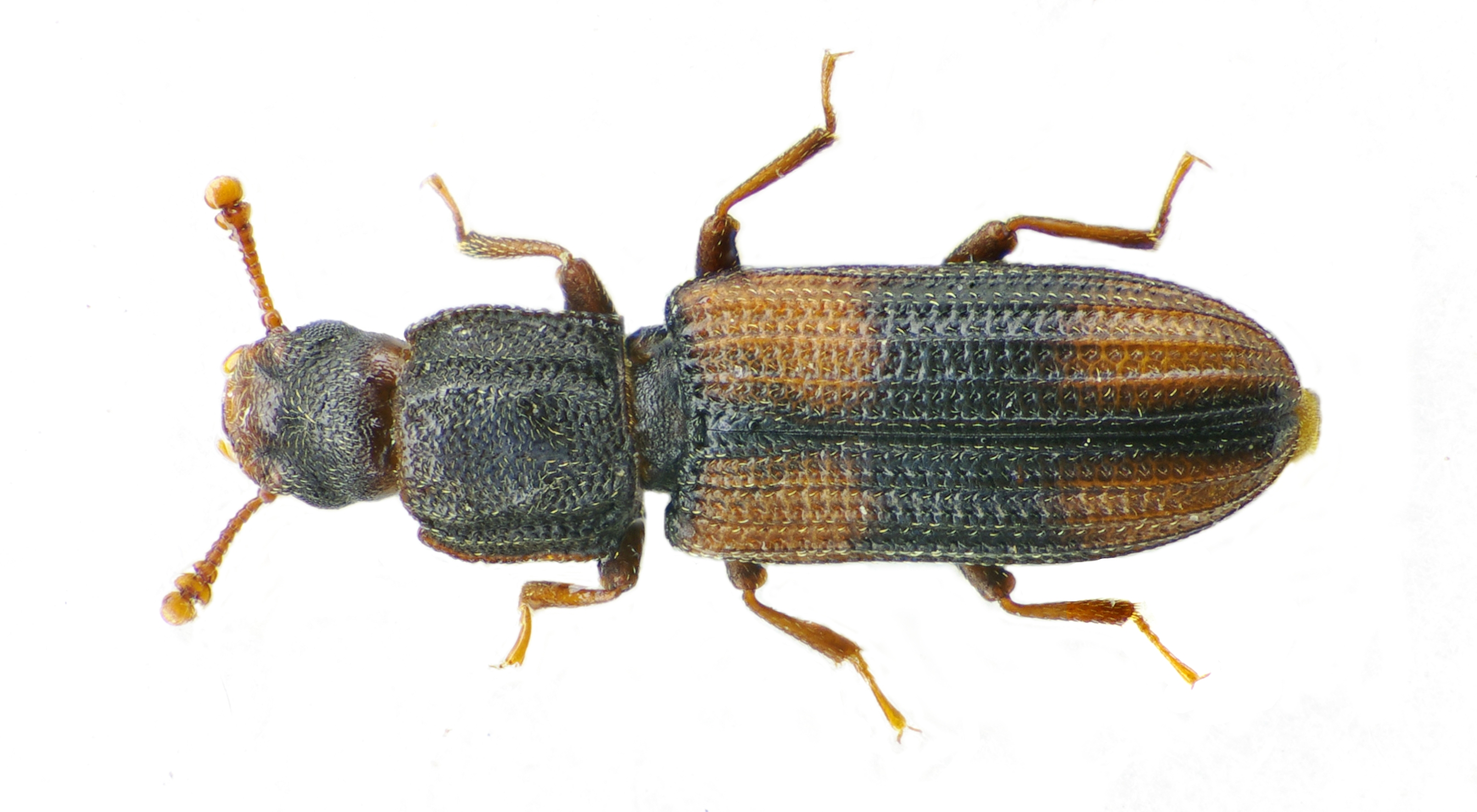
