= Basalia =

Scientific classification
- Domain: Eukaryota
- Kingdom: Animalia
- Phylum: Arthropoda
- Class: Insecta
- Order: Lepidoptera
- Superfamily: Noctuoidea
- Family: Erebidae
- Subtribe: Magnina
- Genus: Basalia; Fibiger, 2008

Genus of moths

Basalia is a genus of moths of the family Erebidae erected by Michael Fibiger in 2008.

== Species ==
- Basalia nilgiroides Fibiger, 2008
- Basalia serius Fibiger, 2008
- Basalia cucullatelloides Fibiger, 2008
- Basalia melanosticta (Hampson, 1907)
