= Pseudocorticus =

Scientific classification
- Kingdom: Animalia
- Phylum: Arthropoda
- Class: Insecta
- Order: Coleoptera
- Suborder: Polyphaga
- Infraorder: Cucujiformia
- Family: Zopheridae
- Tribe: Synchitini
- Genus: Pseudocorticus; Hinton, 1935
- Species: P. blairi

Binomial name
- Pseudocorticus blairi Hinton, 1935

Genus of beetles

Pseudocorticus is a genus of cylindrical bark beetles in the family Zopheridae. There is one described species in Pseudocorticus, P. blairi.
