= Acolobicus =

Scientific classification
- Domain: Eukaryota
- Kingdom: Animalia
- Phylum: Arthropoda
- Class: Insecta
- Order: Coleoptera
- Suborder: Polyphaga
- Infraorder: Cucujiformia
- Family: Zopheridae
- Tribe: Synchitini
- Genus: Acolobicus; Sharp, 1894
- Species: A. erichsoni

Binomial name
- Acolobicus erichsoni (Reitter, 1877)

Genus of insects

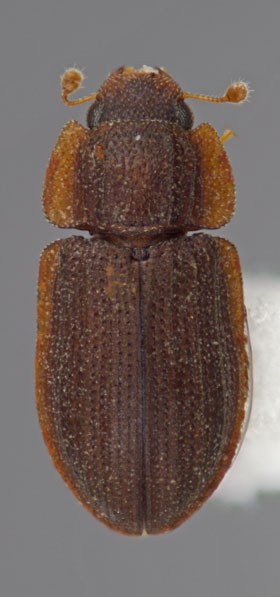
Acolobicus erichsoni, preserved specimen

Acolobicus is a genus of cylindrical bark beetles in the family Zopheridae. There is one described species in Acolobicus, A. erichsoni.
