= Megataphrus =

Scientific classification
- Kingdom: Animalia
- Phylum: Arthropoda
- Class: Insecta
- Order: Coleoptera
- Suborder: Polyphaga
- Infraorder: Cucujiformia
- Family: Zopheridae
- Subfamily: Colydiinae
- Tribe: Synchitini
- Genus: Megataphrus; Casey, 1890

Genus of beetles

Megataphrus is a genus of cylindrical bark beetles in the family Zopheridae. There are at least three described species in Megataphrus.

== Species ==
These three species belong to the genus Megataphrus:

- Megataphrus arizonicus Stephan, 1989
- Megataphrus chandleri Stephan, 1989
- Megataphrus tenuicornis Casey, 1890
