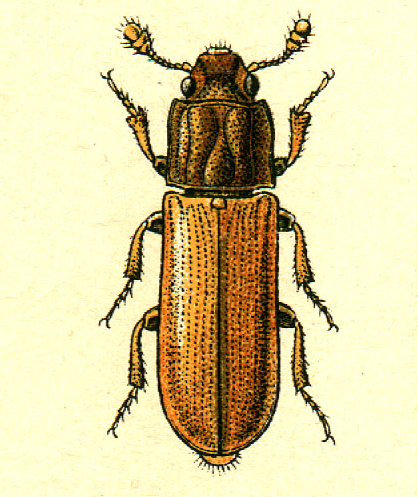
- Aulonium trisulcum

Scientific classification
- Kingdom: Animalia
- Phylum: Arthropoda
- Class: Insecta
- Order: Coleoptera
- Suborder: Polyphaga
- Infraorder: Cucujiformia
- Family: Zopheridae
- Subfamily: Colydiinae
- Tribe: Colydiini
- Genus: Aulonium; Erichson, 1845

= Aulonium =

Genus of cylindrical bark beetles

Aulonium is a genus of cylindrical bark beetles in the family Zopheridae.

== Selected species ==
- Aulonium aequicolle LeConte, 1859
- Aulonium bicolor (Herbst, 1797)
- Aulonium bidentatum Fabricius, 1801
- Aulonium cylindricum Hinton, 1936
- Aulonium ferrugineum Zimmermann, 1869
- Aulonium grande Dajoz, 1980
- Aulonium guyanense Dajoz, 1980
- Aulonium longicolle Dajoz, 1980
- Aulonium longum LeConte, 1866
- Aulonium minutum Dajoz, 1980
- Aulonium parallelopipedum (Say, 1826)
- Aulonium ruficorne (Olivier, 1790)
- Aulonium sulcicolle Wollaston, 1864
- Aulonium thoracicum Dajoz, 1980
- Aulonium trisulcum (Geoffroy, 1785)
- Aulonium tuberculatum LeConte, 1863
- Aulonium ulmoides (Pascoe, 1860)
- Aulonium vicinum Dajoz, 1980
