= Rustica dulcis =

Scientific classification
- Domain: Eukaryota
- Kingdom: Animalia
- Phylum: Arthropoda
- Class: Insecta
- Order: Lepidoptera
- Superfamily: Noctuoidea
- Family: Erebidae
- Genus: Rustica
- Species: R. dulcis

Binomial name
- Rustica dulcis Fibiger, 2008

Species of moth

Rustica dulcis is a moth of the family Erebidae first described by Michael Fibiger in 2008. It is known from the mountains of Sikkim in northern India.

The wingspan is about 13 mm.
