= Basalia melanosticta =

Scientific classification
- Domain: Eukaryota
- Kingdom: Animalia
- Phylum: Arthropoda
- Class: Insecta
- Order: Lepidoptera
- Superfamily: Noctuoidea
- Family: Erebidae
- Genus: Basalia
- Species: B. melanosticta

Binomial name
- Basalia melanosticta (Hampson, 1907)

Synonyms
- Tolpia melanosticta Hampson, 1907

Species of moth

Basalia melanosticta is a moth of the family Erebidae first described by George Hampson in 1907. It is known from the Palani Hills of south-central India.

Adults have been recorded in August.

The wingspan is 17–19 mm.
