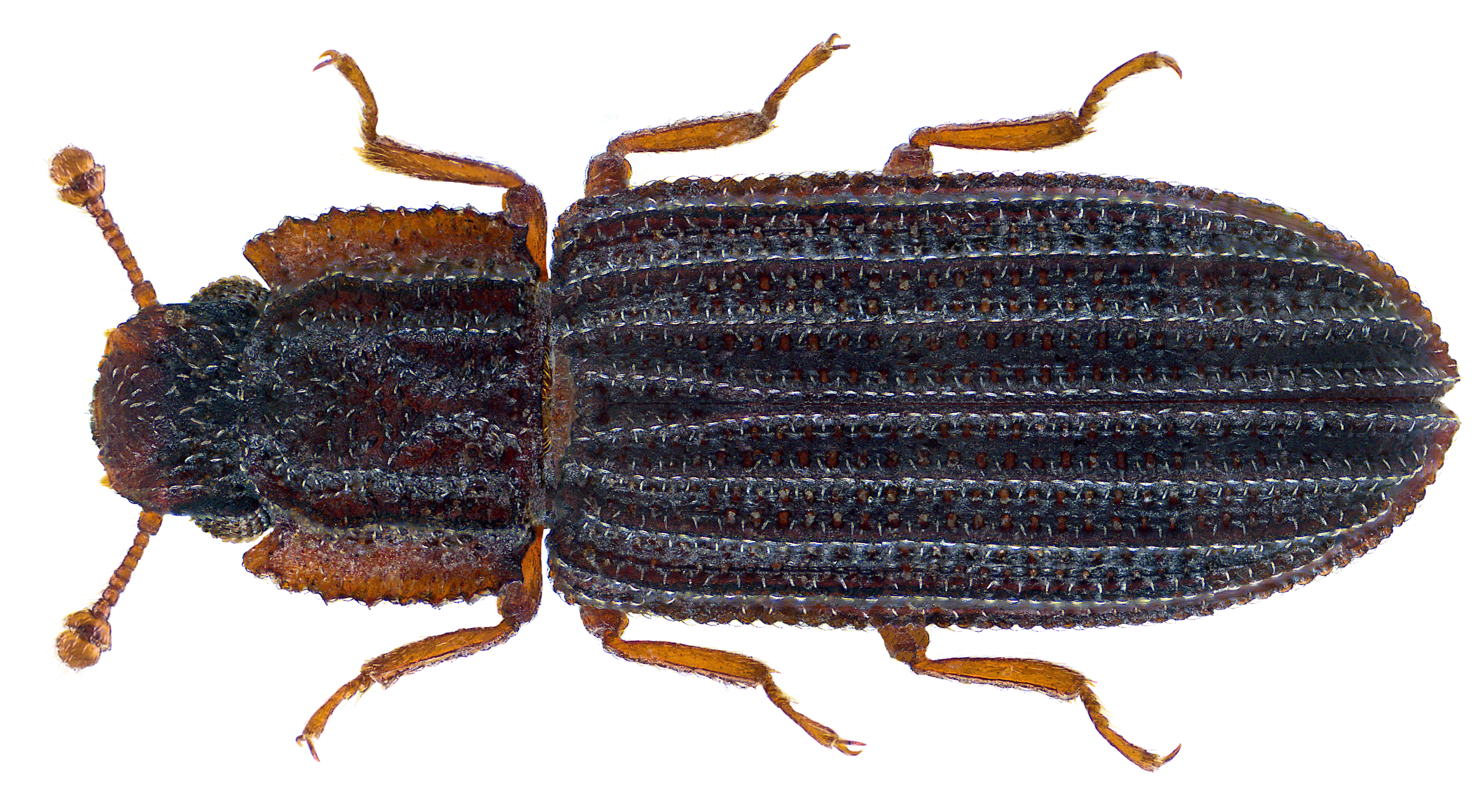
- Microprius rufulus

Scientific classification
- Kingdom: Animalia
- Phylum: Arthropoda
- Class: Insecta
- Order: Coleoptera
- Suborder: Polyphaga
- Infraorder: Cucujiformia
- Family: Zopheridae
- Subfamily: Colydiinae
- Tribe: Synchitini
- Genus: Microprius; Fairmaire, 1868

= Microprius =

Genus of beetles

Microprius is a genus of cylindrical bark beetles in the family Zopheridae. There are at least four described species in Microprius, found in eastern and southeastern Asia, North America, and Europe.

== Species ==
These four species belong to the genus Microprius:

- Microprius demissus (Pascoe, 1863)
- Microprius terrenus Fairmaire, 1868
- Microprius opacus (Sharp, 1885)
- Microprius rufulus (Motschulsky, 1863)
