= Lobogestoria =

Scientific classification
- Kingdom: Animalia
- Phylum: Arthropoda
- Class: Insecta
- Order: Coleoptera
- Suborder: Polyphaga
- Infraorder: Cucujiformia
- Family: Zopheridae
- Tribe: Synchitini
- Genus: Lobogestoria; Reitter, 1878
- Species: L. gibbicollis

Binomial name
- Lobogestoria gibbicollis Reitter, 1878

Genus of beetles

Lobogestoria is a genus of cylindrical bark beetles in the family Zopheridae. There is one described species in Lobogestoria, L. gibbicollis.
