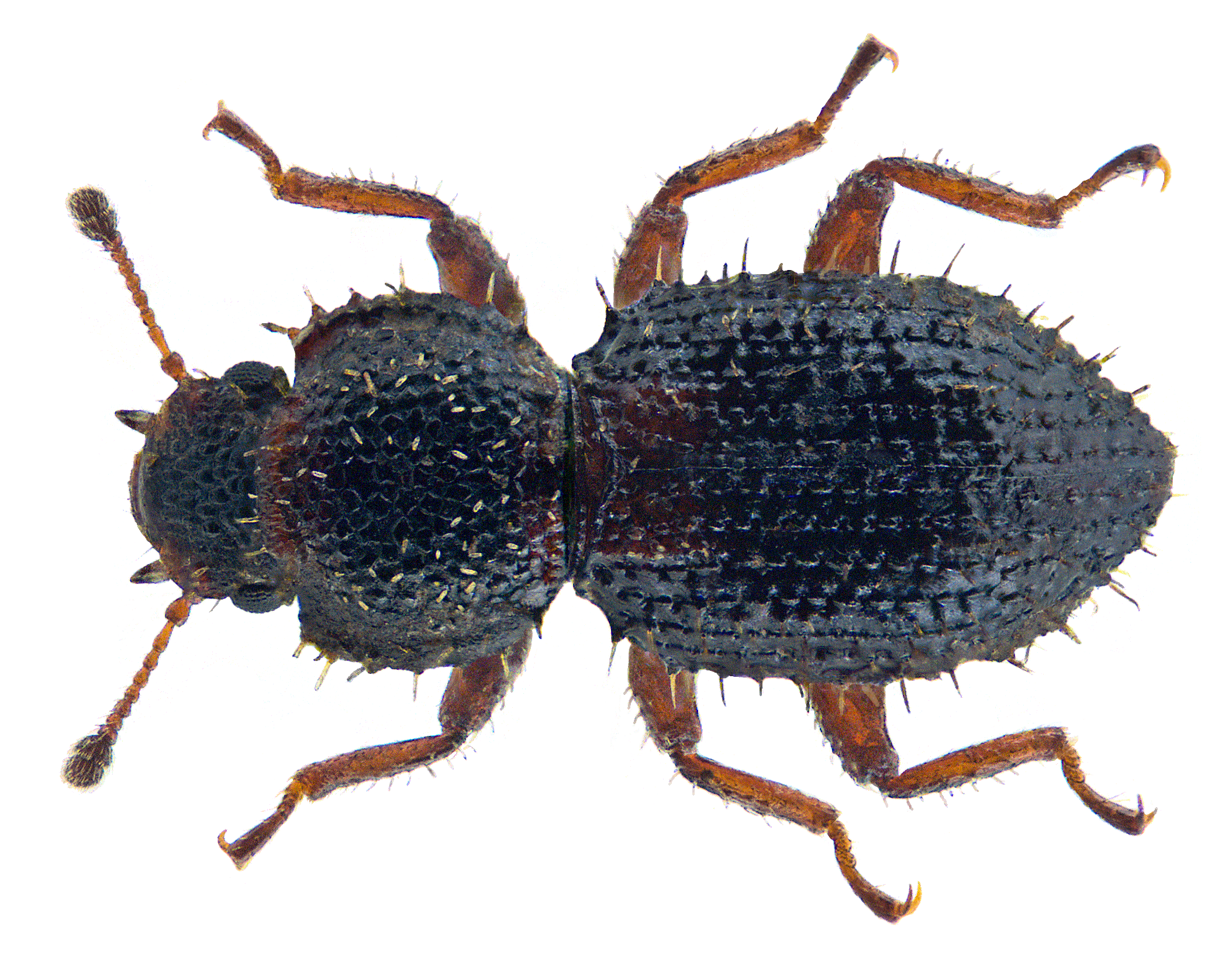

Scientific classification
- Kingdom: Animalia
- Phylum: Arthropoda
- Class: Insecta
- Order: Coleoptera
- Suborder: Polyphaga
- Infraorder: Cucujiformia
- Family: Zopheridae
- Subfamily: Colydiinae
- Tribe: Synchitini
- Genus: Coxelus; Dejean, 1821

= Coxelus =

Genus of beetles

Coxelus is a genus of cylindrical bark beetles in the family Zopheridae. There are about 10 described species of Coxelus.

== Species ==
These 10 species belong to the genus Coxelus:

- Coxelus alinae Dajoz, 1973
- Coxelus bituberculatus (Frivaldszky, 1893)
- Coxelus clarus Broun, 1882
- Coxelus grossanus Broun, 1885
- Coxelus insularis (Grouvelle, 1899)
- Coxelus longus
- Coxelus pictus (J.Sturm, 1807)
- Coxelus serratus Horn, 1885
- Coxelus thoracicus Broun, 1895
- Coxelus unicolor Motschulsky, 1863
