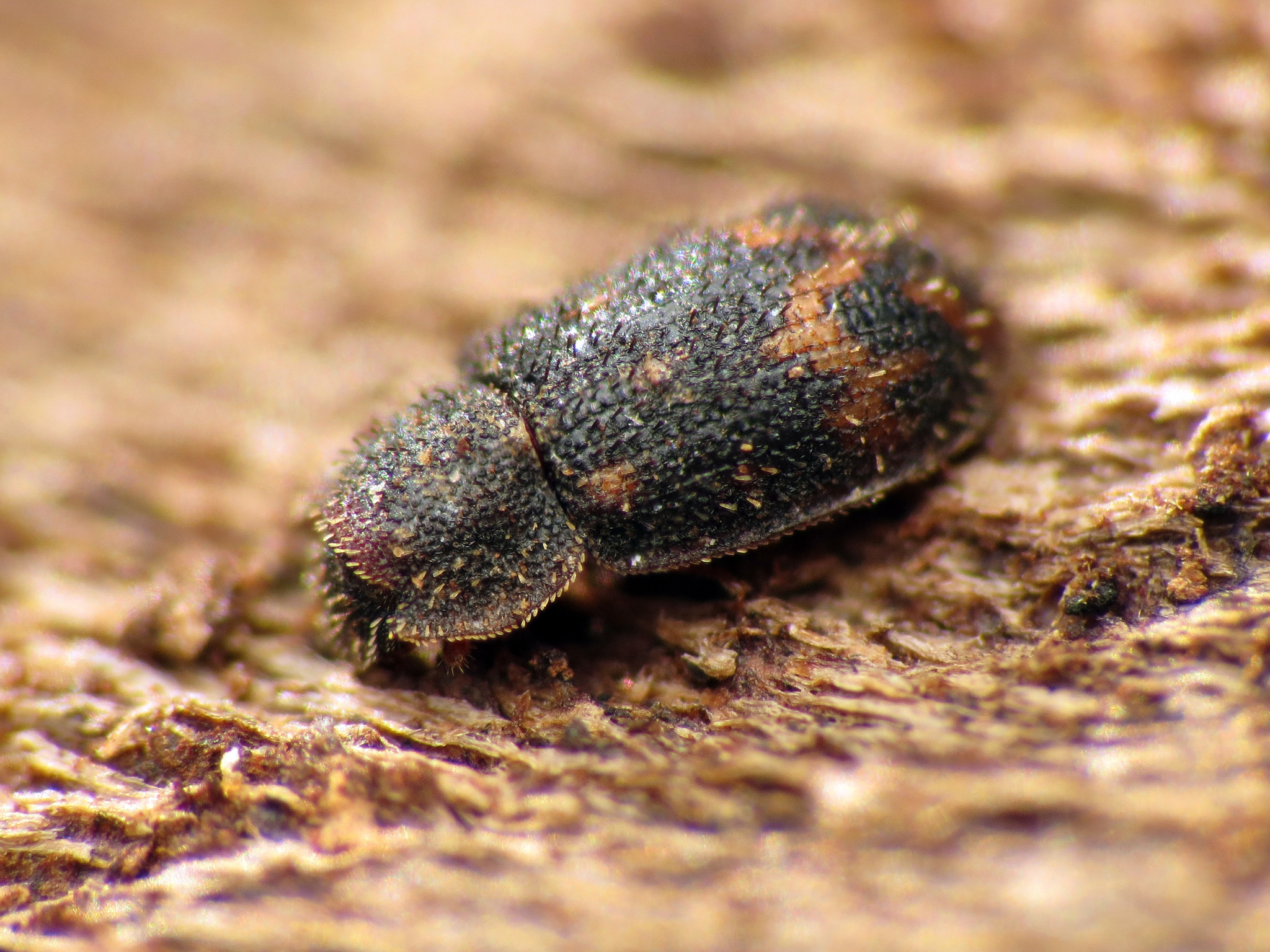
- Eucicones marginalis

Scientific classification
- Kingdom: Animalia
- Phylum: Arthropoda
- Class: Insecta
- Order: Coleoptera
- Suborder: Polyphaga
- Infraorder: Cucujiformia
- Family: Zopheridae
- Subfamily: Colydiinae
- Tribe: Synchitini
- Genus: Eucicones; Sharp, 1894

= Eucicones =

Genus of beetles

Eucicones is a genus of cylindrical bark beetles in the family Zopheridae. There are at least two described species in the genus Eucicones.

== Species ==
These two species belong to the genus Eucicones:

- Eucicones marginalis (Melsheimer, 1846)
- Eucicones oblongopunctata (Wickham, 1913)
