= Bilinea =

Scientific classification
- Domain: Eukaryota
- Kingdom: Animalia
- Phylum: Arthropoda
- Class: Insecta
- Order: Lepidoptera
- Superfamily: Noctuoidea
- Family: Erebidae
- Subtribe: Magnina
- Genus: Bilinea; Fibiger, 2008

Genus of moths

Bilinea is a genus of moths of the family Erebidae first described by Michael Fibiger in 2008.

== Species ==
- Bilinea bilineata (Hampson, 1907)
- Bilinea bilineatissima Fibiger, 2008
