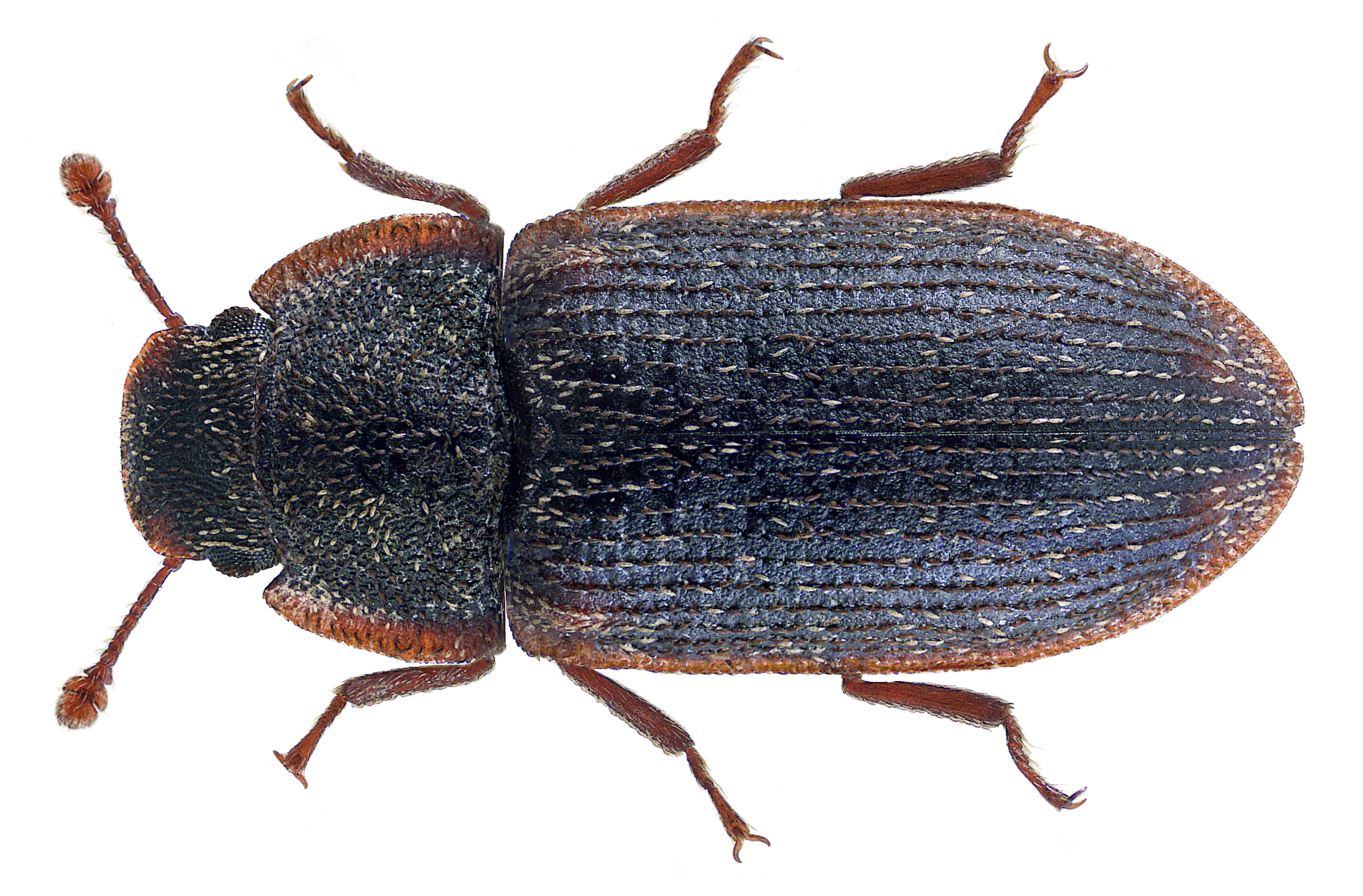
- Colobicus hirtus

Scientific classification
- Kingdom: Animalia
- Phylum: Arthropoda
- Class: Insecta
- Order: Coleoptera
- Suborder: Polyphaga
- Infraorder: Cucujiformia
- Family: Zopheridae
- Subfamily: Colydiinae
- Tribe: Synchitini
- Genus: Colobicus; Latreille, 1807

= Colobicus =

Genus of beetles

Colobicus is a genus of cylindrical bark beetles in the family Zopheridae. There are at least four described species in Colobicus.

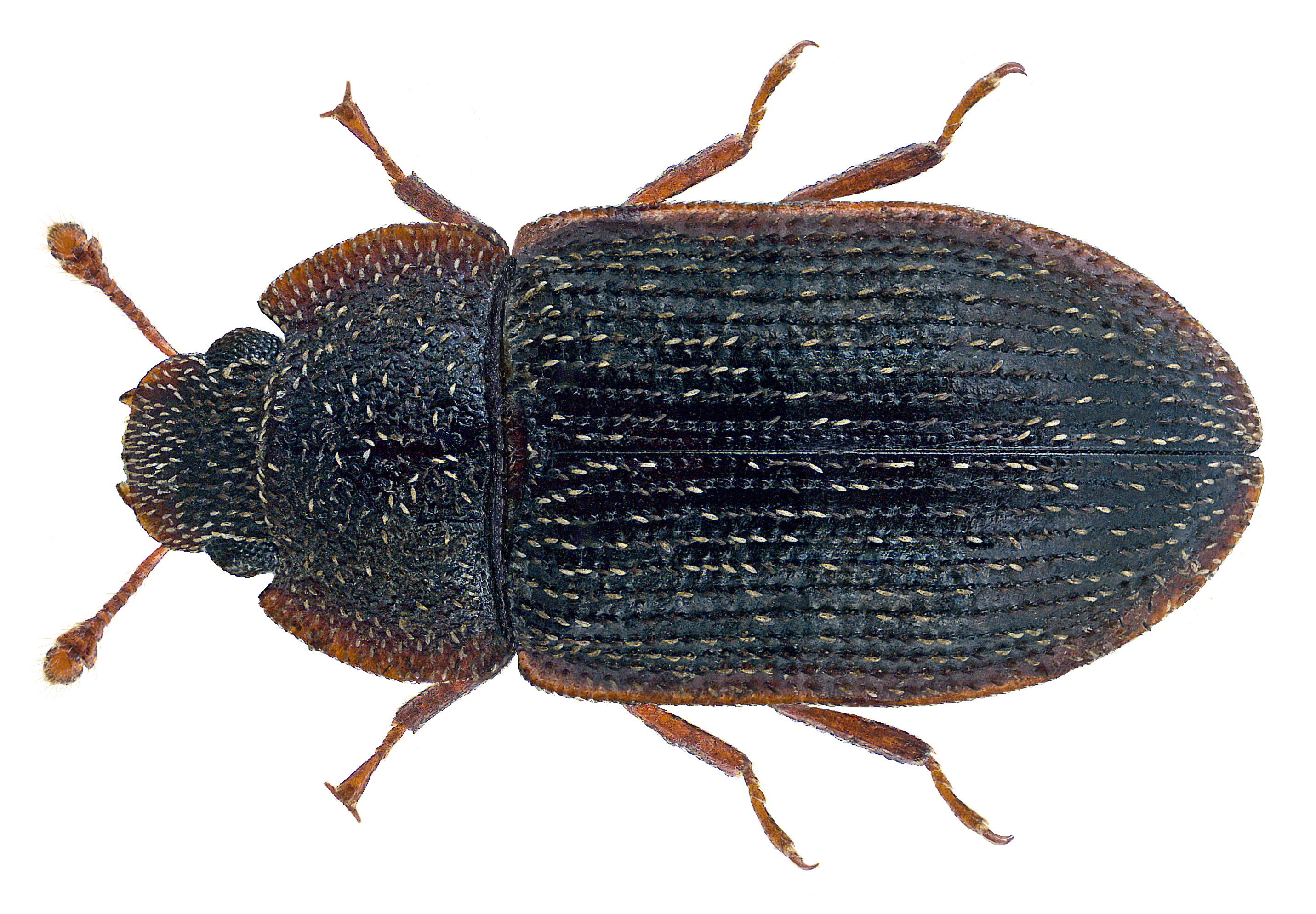
Colobicus parilis

== Species ==
These four species belong to the genus Colobicus:

- Colobicus hirtus (Rossi, 1790)
- Colobicus indicus Motschulsky, 1863
- Colobicus latiusculus Motschulsky, 1863
- Colobicus parilis Pascoe, 1860
