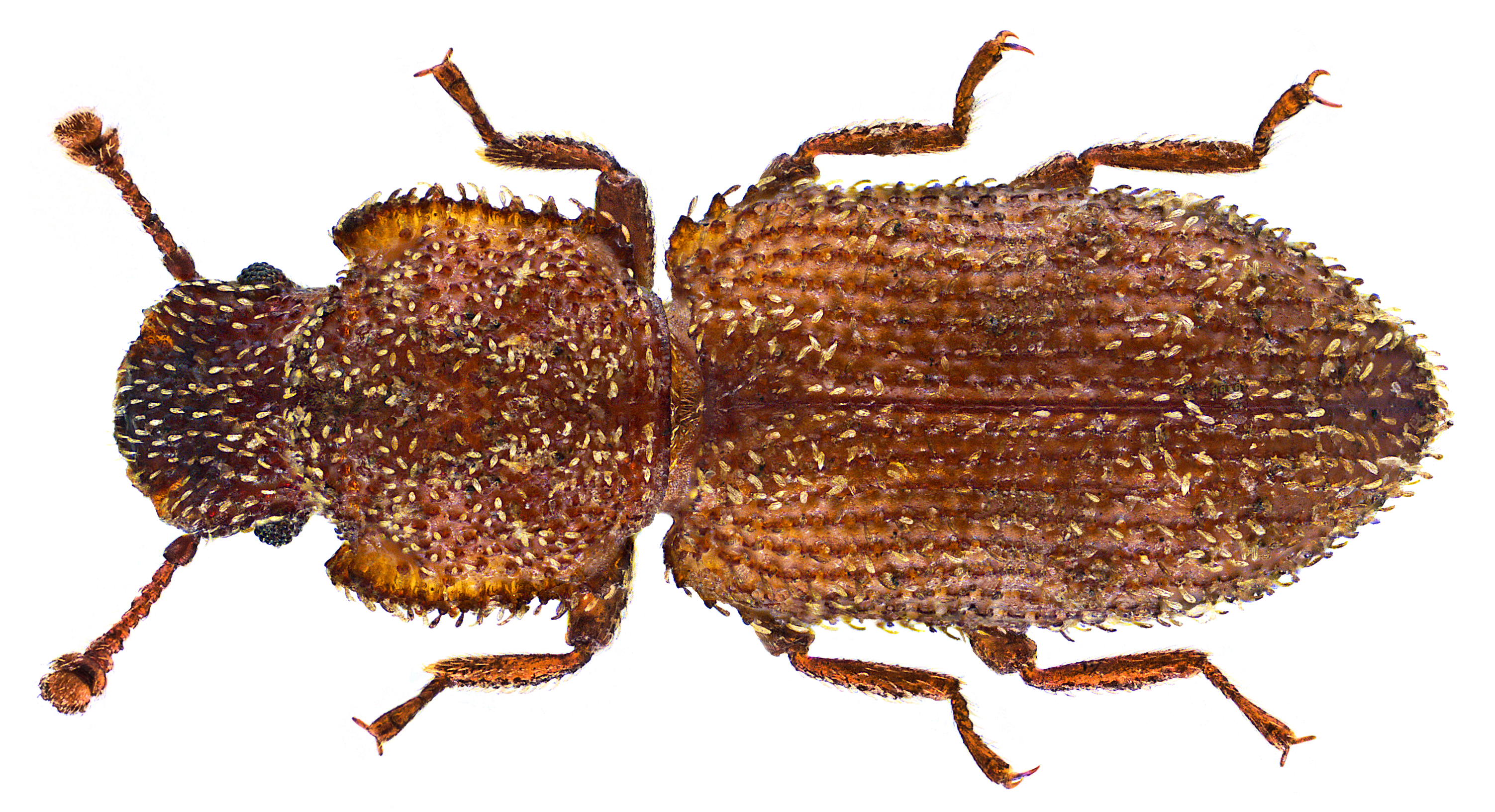
- Namunaria angustata

Scientific classification
- Domain: Eukaryota
- Kingdom: Animalia
- Phylum: Arthropoda
- Class: Insecta
- Order: Coleoptera
- Suborder: Polyphaga
- Infraorder: Cucujiformia
- Family: Zopheridae
- Subfamily: Colydiinae
- Tribe: Synchitini
- Genus: Namunaria; Reitter, 1882

= Namunaria =

Genus of beetles

Namunaria is a genus of cylindrical bark beetles in the family Zopheridae, first described by Edmund Reitter in 1882. There are at least two described species in Namunaria.

== Species ==
These two species belong to the genus Namunaria:

- Namunaria guttulata (LeConte, 1863)
- Namunaria pacifica (Horn, 1878)

BioLib lists 7 species and fails to include the two listed by GBIF:

- Namunaria australis (Grouvelle, 1893)
- Namunaria bhutanensis (Šlipinski, 1981)
- Namunaria chinensis Schuh, 1999
- Namunaria communis (Carter & Zeck, 1937)
- Namunaria mammillaris Schuh, 1999
- Namunaria picta (Sharp, 1885)
- Namunaria rufonotata (Carter & Zeck, 1937)
