= Basalia serius =

Scientific classification
- Domain: Eukaryota
- Kingdom: Animalia
- Phylum: Arthropoda
- Class: Insecta
- Order: Lepidoptera
- Superfamily: Noctuoidea
- Family: Erebidae
- Genus: Basalia
- Species: B. serius

Binomial name
- Basalia serius Fibiger, 2008

Species of moth

Basalia serius is a moth of the family Erebidae first described by Michael Fibiger in 2008. It is known from Tamil Nadu in south-central India.

The wingspan is about 15 mm.
