= Monoedus =

Scientific classification
- Domain: Eukaryota
- Kingdom: Animalia
- Phylum: Arthropoda
- Class: Insecta
- Order: Coleoptera
- Suborder: Polyphaga
- Infraorder: Cucujiformia
- Family: Zopheridae
- Subfamily: Colydiinae
- Tribe: Synchitini
- Genus: Monoedus; Horn, 1882

Synonyms
- Adimerus Sharp, 1894

Genus of beetles

Monoedus is a genus of cylindrical bark beetles in the family Zopheridae. There are about eight described species in Monoedus.

== Species ==
These eight species belong to the genus Monoedus:

- Monoedus grouvellei Dajoz, 1975
- Monoedus guttatus LeConte, 1882
- Monoedus hirtus Dajoz, 1975
- Monoedus horni Grouvelle, 1908
- Monoedus lecontei Fleutiaux & Sallé, 1889
- Monoedus obscurus Grouvelle, 1908
- Monoedus pubescens Dajoz, 1984
- Monoedus zonatus Grouvelle, 1908
