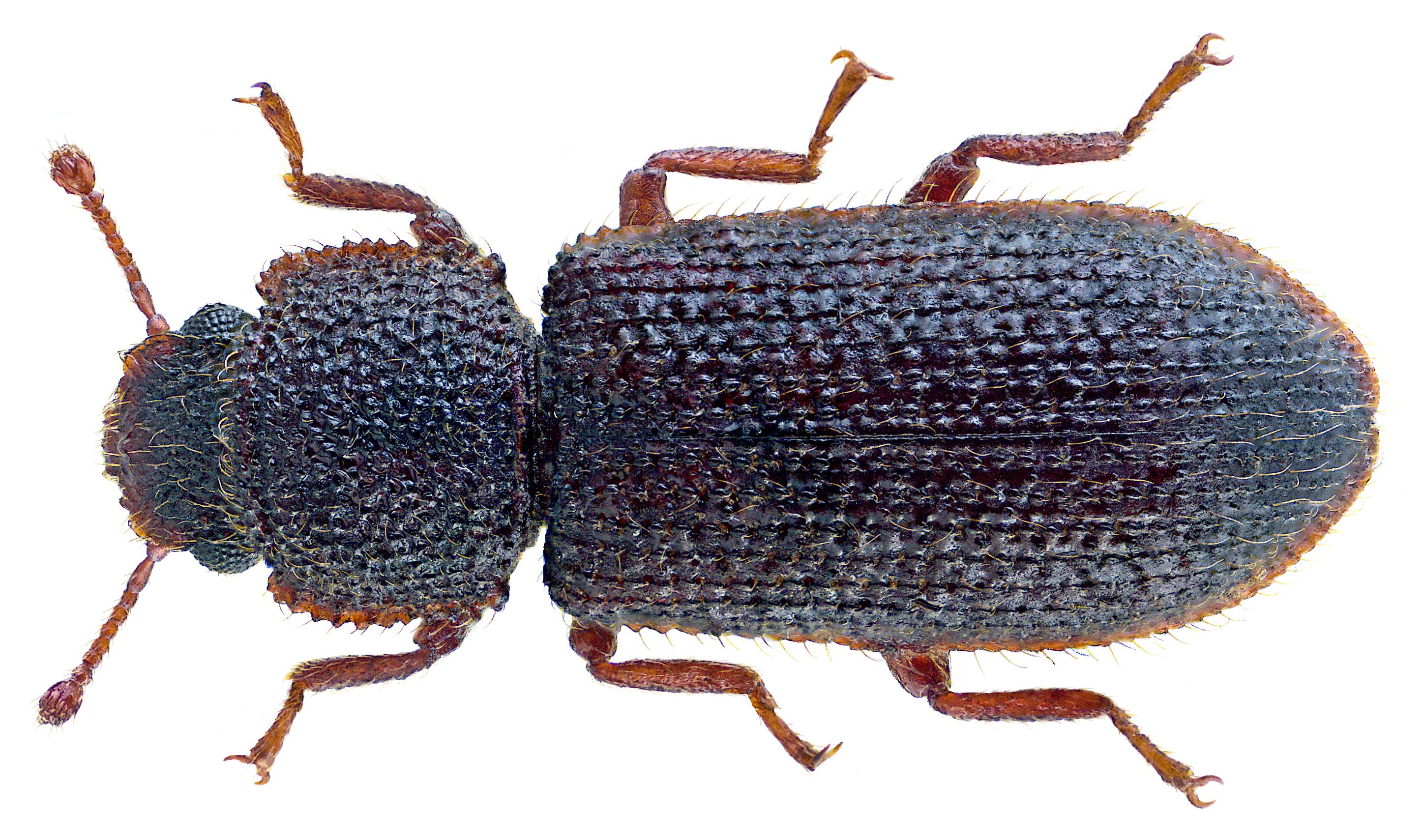
- Endeitoma granulata

Scientific classification
- Kingdom: Animalia
- Phylum: Arthropoda
- Class: Insecta
- Order: Coleoptera
- Suborder: Polyphaga
- Infraorder: Cucujiformia
- Family: Zopheridae
- Subfamily: Colydiinae
- Genus: Endeitoma; Sharp, 1894

= Endeitoma =

Genus of beetles

Endeitoma is a genus of cylindrical bark beetles in the family Zopheridae. There are at least 2 described species in Endeitoma.

== Species ==
- Endeitoma dentata (Horn, 1885)
- Endeitoma granulata (Say, 1826)
