= Palnissa =

Scientific classification
- Domain: Eukaryota
- Kingdom: Animalia
- Phylum: Arthropoda
- Class: Insecta
- Order: Lepidoptera
- Superfamily: Noctuoidea
- Family: Erebidae
- Genus: Palnissa; Fibiger, 2008
- Species: P. spatula

Binomial name
- Palnissa spatula Fibiger, 2008

Genus of moths

Palnissa is a monotypic moth genus of the family Erebidae. Its only species, Palnissa spatula, is known from the Palani Hills of south-central India. Both the genus and the species were first described by Michael Fibiger in 2008.

The wingspan is about 11 mm.
