= Paha (beetle) =

Scientific classification
- Domain: Eukaryota
- Kingdom: Animalia
- Phylum: Arthropoda
- Class: Insecta
- Order: Coleoptera
- Suborder: Polyphaga
- Infraorder: Cucujiformia
- Family: Zopheridae
- Subfamily: Colydiinae
- Genus: Paha; Dajoz, 1984

Genus of beetles

Paha is a genus of cylindrical bark beetles in the family Zopheridae. There are at least two described species in Paha.

== Species ==
These two species belong to the genus Paha:

- Paha guadalupensis Dajoz, 1984
- Paha laticollis (LeConte, 1863)
