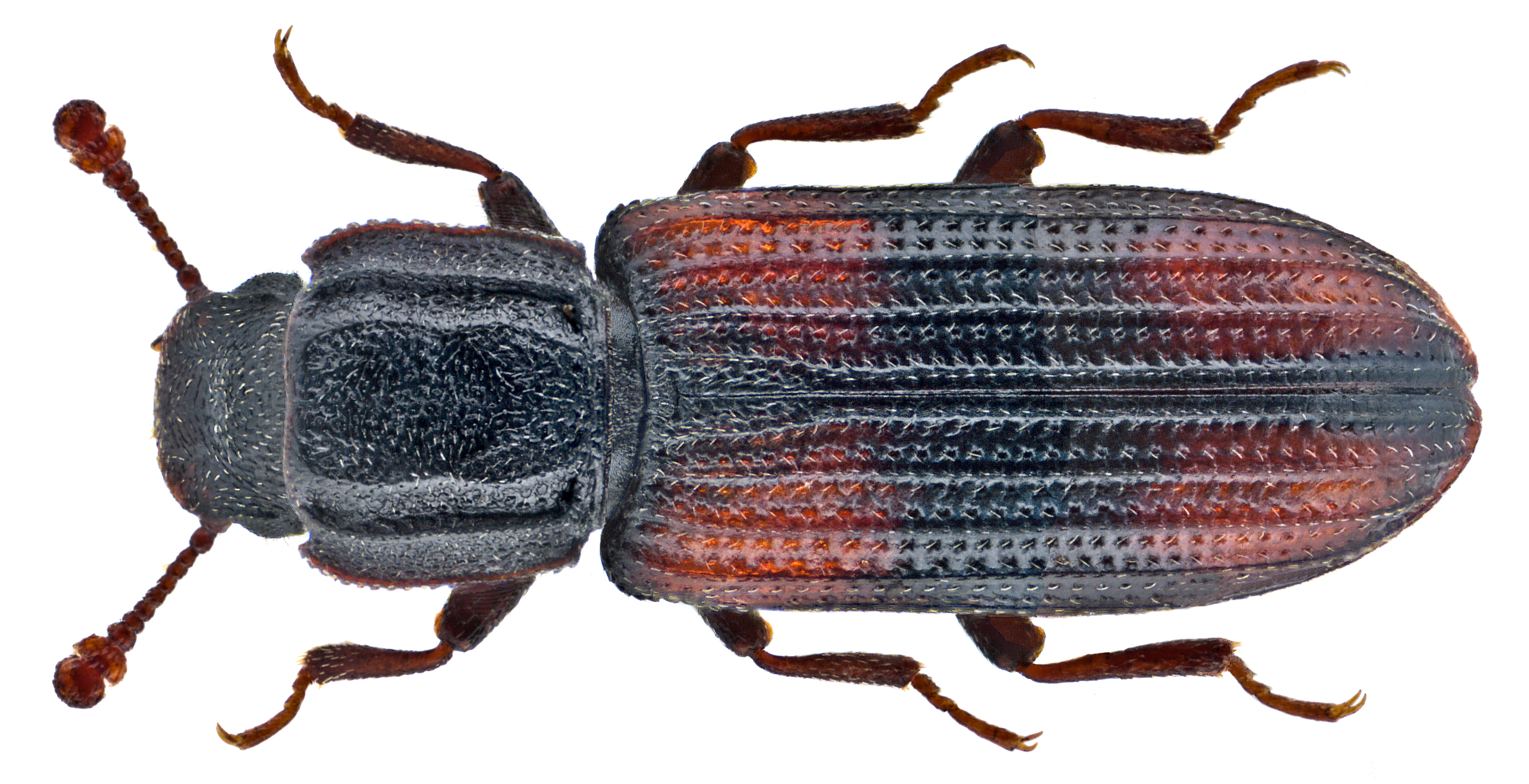
- Bitoma crenata

Scientific classification
- Kingdom: Animalia
- Phylum: Arthropoda
- Class: Insecta
- Order: Coleoptera
- Suborder: Polyphaga
- Infraorder: Cucujiformia
- Family: Zopheridae
- Subfamily: Colydiinae
- Genus: Bitoma; Herbst, 1793

Synonyms
- Eulachus Erichson, 1845

= Bitoma =

Genus of beetles

Bitoma is a genus of cylindrical bark beetles in the family Zopheridae. There are about 15 described species in Bitoma.

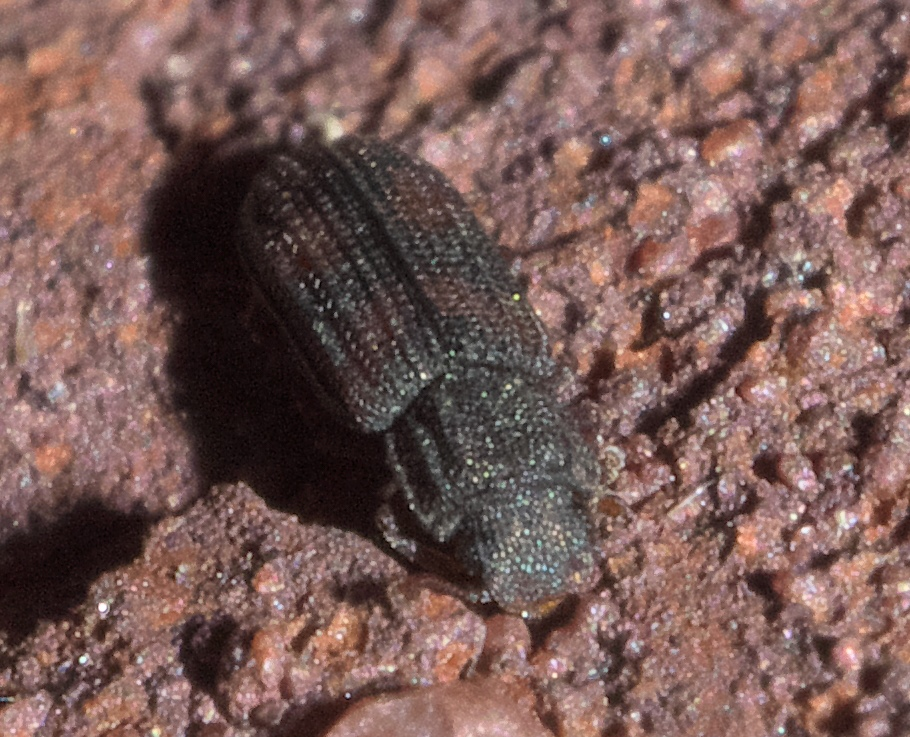
Bitoma quadriguttata

== Species ==
- Bitoma brevipes (Sharp, 1894)
- Bitoma carinata (LeConte, 1863)
- Bitoma crenata (Fabricius, 1775)
- Bitoma discolor Schaeffer, 1907
- Bitoma exarata (Pascoe, 1863)
- Bitoma gracilis Sharp, 1894
- Bitoma granulata (Blatchley, 1910)
- Bitoma neglecta Stephan, 1989
- Bitoma ornata (LeConte, 1858)
- Bitoma parallela (Sharp, 1885)
- Bitoma pinicola Schaeffer, 1907
- Bitoma quadricollis (Horn, 1885)
- Bitoma quadriguttata (Say, 1826)
- Bitoma sulcata (LeConte, 1858)
- Bitoma vittata Schaeffer, 1907
