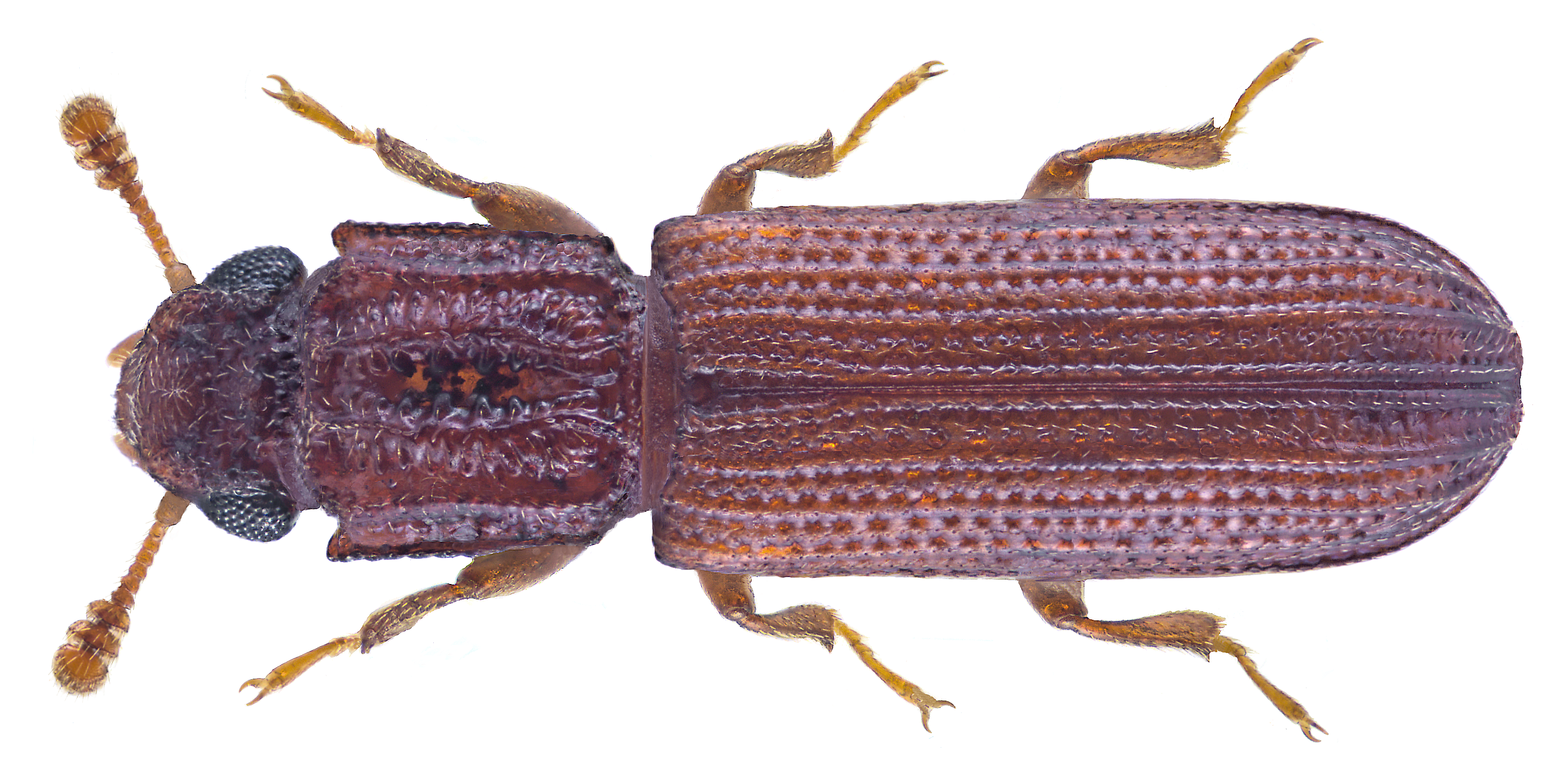
- Size: 3,1 mm. 1400-1800 m leg

Scientific classification
- Kingdom: Animalia
- Phylum: Arthropoda
- Class: Insecta
- Order: Coleoptera
- Suborder: Polyphaga
- Infraorder: Cucujiformia
- Family: Zopheridae
- Subfamily: Colydiinae
- Genus: Lasconotus; Erichson, 1845

= Lasconotus =

Genus of beetles

Lasconotus is a genus of cylindrical bark beetles in the family Zopheridae. There are at least 20 described species in Lasconotus.

== Species ==
These 21 species belong to the genus Lasconotus:

- Lasconotus bitomoides Kraus, 1912
- Lasconotus borealis Horn, 1878
- Lasconotus complex LeConte, 1859
- Lasconotus concavus Casey, 1890
- Lasconotus fiskei Kraus, 1912
- Lasconotus fitzgibbonae Kingsolver, Stephan & Moser, 2006
- Lasconotus flexuosus Kraus, 1912
- Lasconotus intricatus Kraus, 1912
- Lasconotus knulli Stephan, 1989
- Lasconotus laqueatus LeConte, 1866
- Lasconotus linearis Crotch, 1874
- Lasconotus nucleatus Casey, 1890
- Lasconotus pertenuis Casey, 1890
- Lasconotus planipennis Kraus, 1912
- Lasconotus pusillus LeConte, 1863
- Lasconotus referendarius Zimmermann, 1869
- Lasconotus servus Horn, 1885
- Lasconotus simplex LeConte, 1866
- Lasconotus subcostulatus Kraus, 1912
- Lasconotus tuberculatus Kraus, 1912
- Lasconotus vegrandis Horn, 1885
