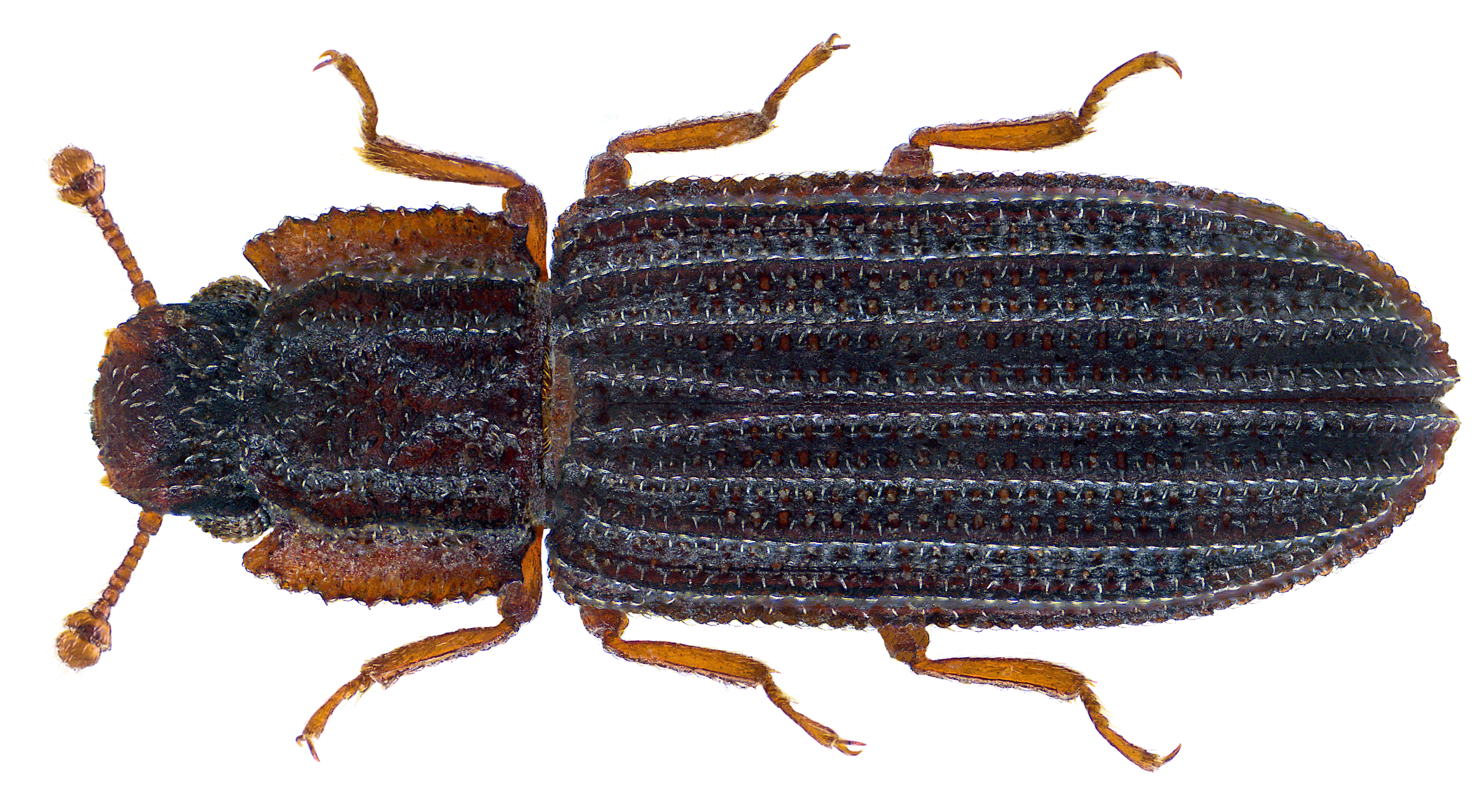
- Microprius rufulus

Scientific classification
- Kingdom: Animalia
- Phylum: Arthropoda
- Class: Insecta
- Order: Coleoptera
- Suborder: Polyphaga
- Infraorder: Cucujiformia
- Family: Zopheridae
- Subfamily: Colydiinae
- Tribe: Synchitini; Erichson, 1845

Type genus
- Synchita Hellwig, 1792

= Synchitini =

Synchitini Temporal range: Cenomanian–Recent

Tribe of beetles

Synchitini is a tribe of cylindrical bark beetles in the family Zopheridae. There are about 19 genera and at least 40 described species in Synchitini.

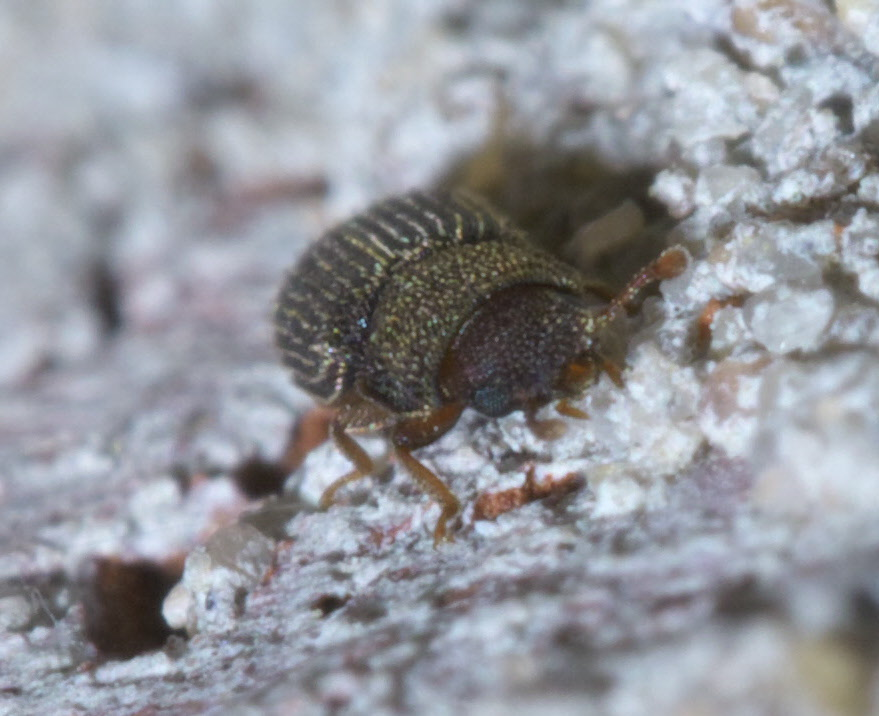
Synchita fuliginosa

== Genera ==
These 19 genera belong to the tribe Synchitini:

- Acolobicus Sharp, 1894^{i c g b}
- Bitoma Herbst, 1793^{i c g b}
- Colobicus Latreille, 1807^{i c g b}
- Coxelus Dejean, 1821^{i c g b}
- Denophoelus Stephan, 1989^{i c g b}
- Endeitoma Sharp, 1894^{i c g b}
- Eucicones Sharp, 1894^{i c g b}
- Eudesma LeConte, 1863^{i c g b}
- Lasconotus Erichson, 1845^{i c g b}
- Lobogestoria Reitter, 1878^{i c g b}
- Lyreus Aubé, 1861^{i c g b}
- Megataphrus Casey, 1890^{i c g b}
- Microprius Fairmaire, 1868^{i c g b}
- Monoedus Horn, 1882^{i c g b}
- Namunaria Reitter, 1882^{i c g b}
- Paha Dajoz, 1984^{i c g b}
- Phloeonemus Erichson, 1845^{i c g b}
- Pseudocorticus Hinton, 1935^{i c g b}
- Synchita Hellwig, 1792^{i c g b}

Data sources: i = ITIS, c = Catalogue of Life, g = GBIF, b = Bugguide.net

=== Fossil genera ===
- †Paleoendeitoma Deng et al. 2017 Burmese amber, Myanmar, Cenomanian
