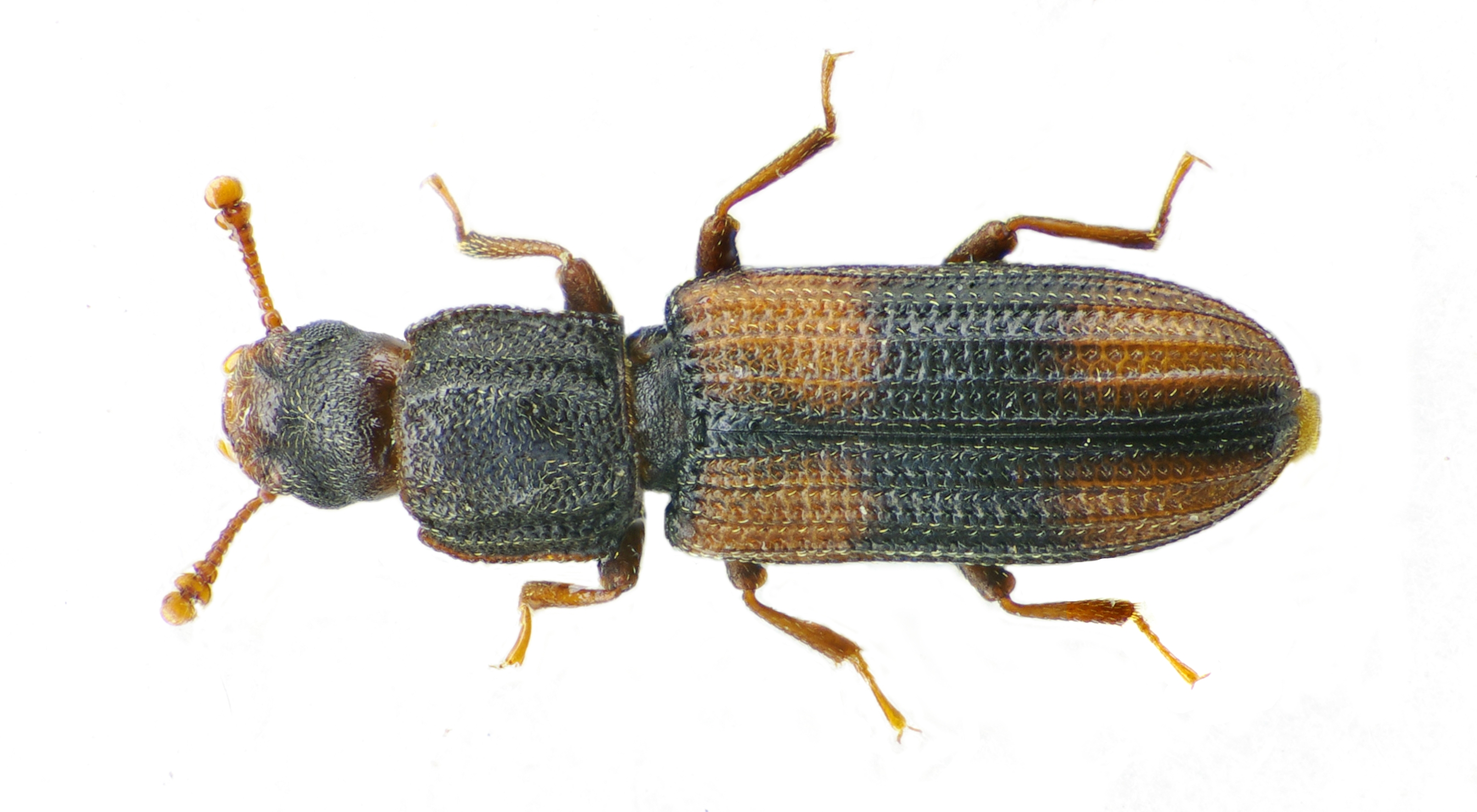
- Bitoma crenata Imago

Scientific classification
- Kingdom: Animalia
- Phylum: Arthropoda
- Clade: Pancrustacea
- Class: Insecta
- Order: Coleoptera
- Suborder: Polyphaga
- Infraorder: Cucujiformia
- Family: Zopheridae
- Subfamily: Colydiinae; Billberg, 1820

Diversity
- About 140 genera in 6–9 tribes

Synonyms
- Colydiidae

= Colydiinae =

Colydiinae Temporal range: Cenomanian–Present

Subfamily of beetles

Synchita variegata associated with Kretzschmaria deusta

Colydiinae is a subfamily of beetles, commonly known as cylindrical bark beetles. They have been treated historically as a family Colydiidae, but have been moved into the Zopheridae, where they constitute the bulk of the diversity of the newly expanded family, with about 140 genera worldwide. They are diverse for example in the Australian region, from where about 35 genera are known; in Europe, though, only 20 genera are found and many of these only with few species.

Little is known about the biology of these beetles. Most feed on fungi, others are carnivores and eat small arthropods such as bark beetles.

== Systematics and taxonomy ==
Up to 9 tribes are accepted by various authors; others, however, synonymize some of these. Formerly, many additional tribes were recognized, but the Synchitini, for example, are today generally held to include a number of these tribes, and are even sometimes merged into the Colydiini.

The tribes are:

- Acropini
- Adimerini
- Colydiini Billberg, 1820
- Gempylodini
- Nematidiini
- Orthocerini Blanchard, 1845 (= Sarrotriini Billberg, 1820 (nom. rej.))
- Rhagoderini
- Rhopalocerini
- Synchitini Erichson, 1845 (sometimes in Colydiini)

Delimitation of the Colydiinae against the other lineages of Zopheridae is usually unproblematic. The only significant case of dispute may be the Pycnomerini, which is a small lineage of Zopheridae incertae sedis and was formerly considered an independent family like the "Colydiidae". That treatment is almost certainly wrong, but whether these beetles should be placed in Zopheridae as an additional subfamily Pycnomerinae, or treated as tribe Pycnomerini – and if the latter, whether they are better included in the Colydiinae or the Zopherinae – is still disputed.

=== Selected genera ===
Genera of cylindrical bark beetles include:

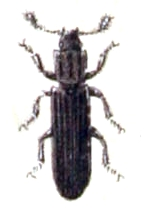
Colydium elongatum of the tribe Colydiini

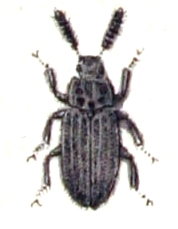
Orthocerus clavicornis of the disputed tribe Orthocerini

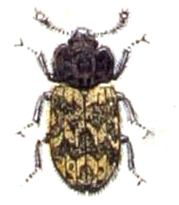
Synchita variegata of the disputed tribe Synchitini

- Ablabus Broun, 1880
- Acolobicus
- Acolophoides Slipinski & Lawrence, 1997
- Acolophus Sharp, 1885
- Acostonotus Slipinski & Lawrence, 1997
- Acropis Burmeister, 1840
- Afrorthocerus
- Allobitoma Broun, 1921
- Alluauditoma
- Anosyana
- Antilissus Sharp, 1879
- Ascomma
- Asprotera
- Asynchita
- Atyscus
- Aulonium Erichson, 1845
- Bhutania
- Bitoma Herbst, 1793
- Bolcocius Dajoz, 1977
- Bulasconotus Ślipiński & Lawrence, 1997
- Bupala
- Cacotarphius
- Caprodes Pascoe, 1863
- Catolaemus
- Cebia Pascoe, 1863
- Cerchanotus Erichson, 1845
- Chorasus Sharp, 1882 (including Vitiacus)
- Cicablabus Slipinski & Lawrence, 1997
- Cicones
- Ciconissus Broun, 1893 (including Caanthus)
- Colobicones Grouvelle, 1918
- Colobicus Latreille, 1807
- Colydium Fabricius, 1792
- Colydodes
- Corticus Germar, 1824
- Coxelus Dejean, 1821
- Dechomus
- Denophloeus
- Diodesma Latreille, 1829
- Diplagia Reitter, 1882
- Diplotoma
- Ditomoidea
- Emilka
- Endeitoma Sharp, 1894
- Endocoxelus
- Endophloeus Dejean, 1834
- Enhypnon Carter, 1919
- Epistranodes Slipinski & Lawrence, 1997
- Epistranus Sharp, 1878
- Erylus
- Eucicones
- Eudesma
- Eulachus
- Faecula Slipinski & Lawrence, 1997
- Fenerivia
- Gempylodes Pascoe 1863
- Glenentela Broun, 1893
- Glyphocryptus Sharp, [1885]
- Helioctamenus Schaufuss, 1882
- Heterargus Sharp, 1886 (including Gathocles, Protarphius)
- Holopleuridia
- Hyberis
- Hystricones
- Isotarphius
- Kanantsia
- Labrotrichus
- Langelandia Aubé, 1843
- Lascobitoma Slipinski & Lawrence, 1997
- Lasconotus Erichson, 1845
- Lascotonus
- Lascotrichus
- Lastrema Reitter, 1882
- Linophloeus
- Lobogestoria
- Lobomesa Slipinski & Lawrence, 1997
- Lyreus Aubé, 1861
- Madacones
- Madadesia
- Madenphloeus
- Mamakius
- Megataphrus
- Microprius Fairmaire, 1868
- Microsicus
- Mnionychus
- Monoedus Horn, 1882 (including Adimerus)
- Munaria Reitter, 1882
- Namunaria Reitter, 1882 (including Sympanotus)
- Nematidium Erichson, 1845
- Neotrichus Sharp, 1885
- Niphopelta Reitter, 1882
- Norix Broun, 1893
- Nosodomodes Reitter, 1922
- Notocoxelus Ślipiński & Lawrence, 1997
- Orthocerus Latreille, 1796 (including Sarrotrium)
- Paha
- Paratarphius
- Paryphus
- Pharax
- Phloeodalis
- Phloeonemus
- Phormesa
- Phorminx Carter & Zeck, 1937
- Phreatus
- Priolomopsis
- Priolomus
- Pristoderus Hope, 1840 (= Dryptops, Enarsus, Recyntus, Sparactus, Ulonotus)
- Prosteca Wollaston, 1860
- Pseudendestes Lawrence, 1980
- Pseudocorticus
- Pseudotarphius
- Rechodes
- Rhagodera Mannerheim 1843
- Rhopalocerus Redtenbacher, 1842
- Rytinotus Broun, 1880
- Sallachius
- Sassaka
- Sechellotoma
- Sprecodes
- Synagathis Carter & Zeck, 1937
- Syncalus Sharp, 1876 (including Acosmetus)
- Synchita Hellwig, 1792
- Tarphiablabus Ślipiński & Lawrence, 1997
- Tarphiomimus Wollaston, 1873
- Tarphiosoma
- Tarphius Erichson, 1845
- Tentablabus Slipinski & Lawrence, 1997
- Todima Grouvelle, 1893
- Todimopsis Ślipiński & Lawrence, 1997
- Trachypholis Erichson, 1845
- Trigonophloeus
- Xylolaemus Redtenbacher, 1858
- Zanclea

The genera Pycnomerodes, Pycnomerus and Rhizonium are sometimes included in the Colydiinae too. Other authors consider the latter incertae sedis among the Tenebrionoidea; for the former two, see above. The species Xylolaemus sakhnovi was described in 2014 from a fossil preserved in Baltic amber, which dates to the Middle Eocene. This was the first species of Xylolaemus described from the fossil record. The extinct genus Paleoendeitoma, belonging to the extant tribe Synchitini is known from the Cenomanian aged Burmese amber of Myanmar.

== See also ==
- List of beetle species recorded in Britain – superfamily Tenebrionoidea
