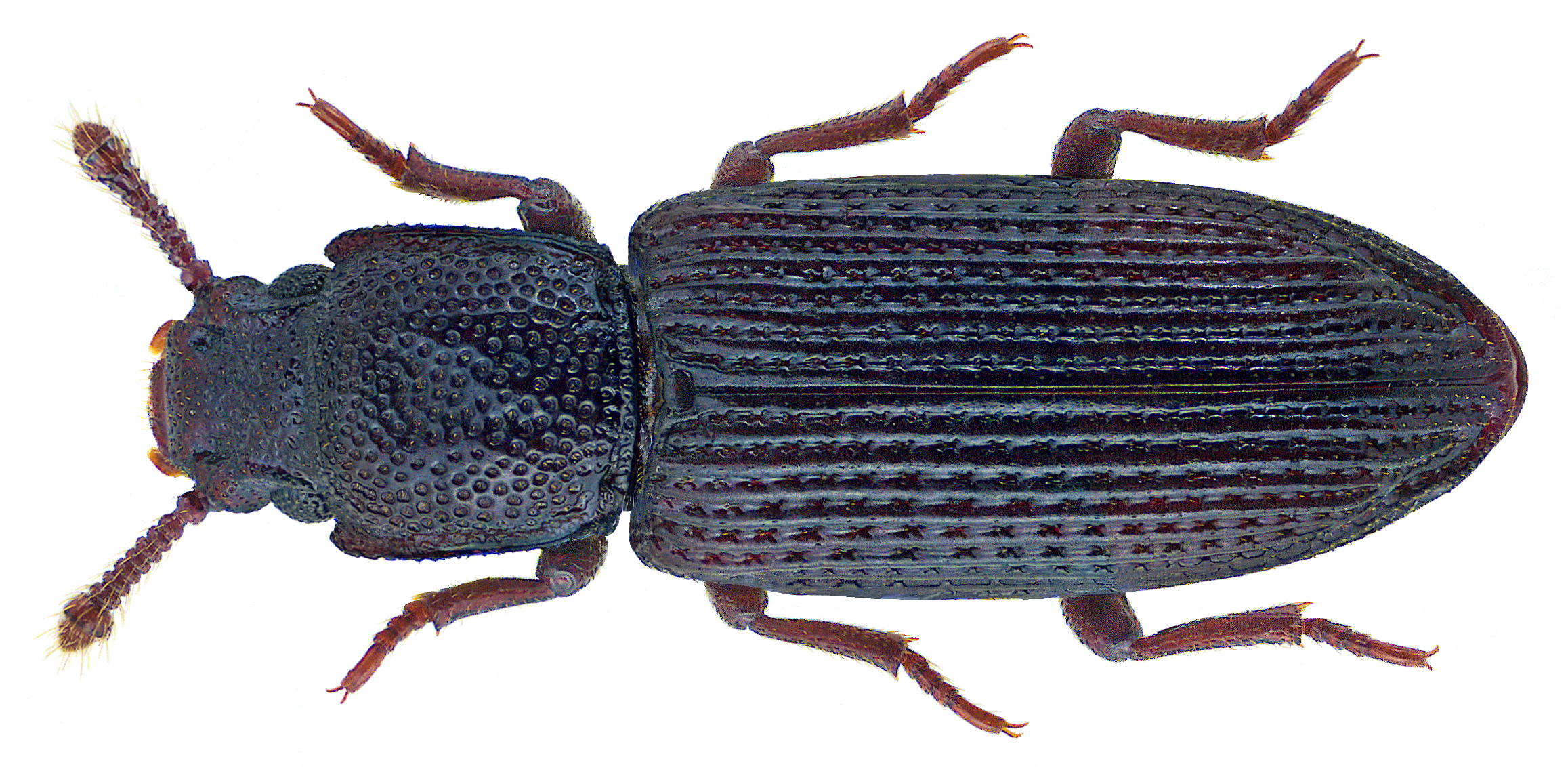
- Pycnomerus depressiusculus 3,7 mm

Scientific classification
- Kingdom: Animalia
- Phylum: Arthropoda
- Class: Insecta
- Order: Coleoptera
- Suborder: Polyphaga
- Infraorder: Cucujiformia
- Family: Zopheridae
- Genus: Pycnomerus
- Species: P. depressiusculus

Binomial name
- Pycnomerus depressiusculus (White, 1846)

= Pycnomerus depressiusculus =

Species of beetle

Pycnomerus depressiusculus is a species of beetle in family Zopheridae. It is found in the Palearctic.
