= Pycnomerus haematodes =

Scientific classification
- Domain: Eukaryota
- Kingdom: Animalia
- Phylum: Arthropoda
- Class: Insecta
- Order: Coleoptera
- Suborder: Polyphaga
- Infraorder: Cucujiformia
- Family: Zopheridae
- Genus: Pycnomerus
- Species: P. haematodes

Binomial name
- Pycnomerus haematodes (Fabricius, 1801)

Species of beetle

Pycnomerus haematodes is a species of ironclad beetle in the family Zopheridae. It is found in North America.
