= Pycnomerus reflexus =

Scientific classification
- Domain: Eukaryota
- Kingdom: Animalia
- Phylum: Arthropoda
- Class: Insecta
- Order: Coleoptera
- Suborder: Polyphaga
- Infraorder: Cucujiformia
- Family: Zopheridae
- Genus: Pycnomerus
- Species: P. reflexus

Binomial name
- Pycnomerus reflexus (Say, 1826)

Synonyms
- Endectus nitidus LeConte, 1861

Species of beetle

Pycnomerus reflexus is a species of ironclad beetle belonging to the family Zopheridae. It is distributed across North America.
