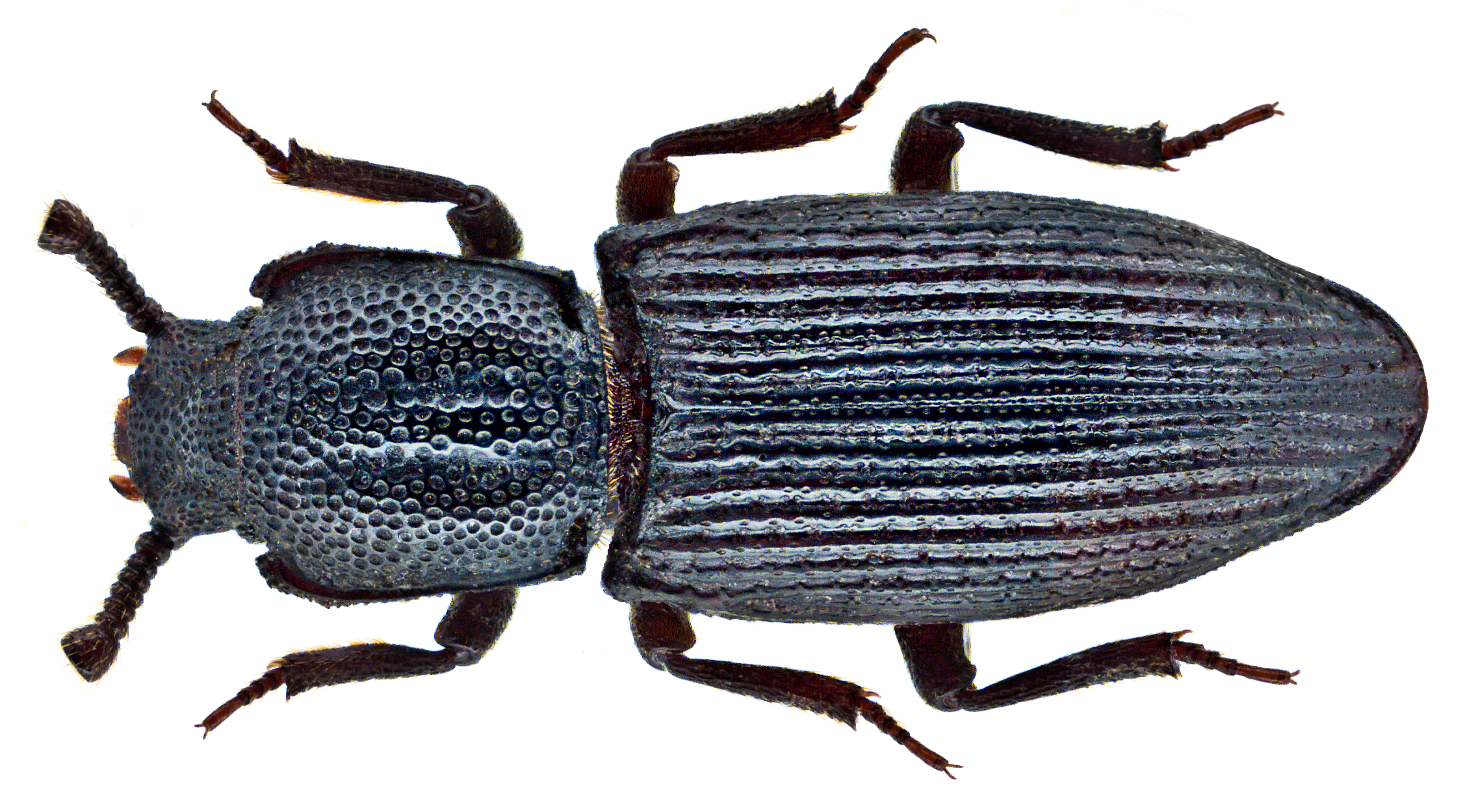
- Pycnomerus sulcicollis

Scientific classification
- Kingdom: Animalia
- Phylum: Arthropoda
- Class: Insecta
- Order: Coleoptera
- Suborder: Polyphaga
- Infraorder: Cucujiformia
- Family: Zopheridae
- Subfamily: Zopherinae
- Tribe: Pycnomerini
- Genus: Pycnomerus; Erichson, 1842

Synonyms
- Penthelispa Pascoe, 1860

= Pycnomerus =

Genus of beetles

Pycnomerus is a genus of ironclad beetles in the family Zopheridae. There are more than 20 described species in Pycnomerus.

== Species ==
These 28 species belong to the genus Pycnomerus:

- Pycnomerus antennalis Hinton
- Pycnomerus arboreus Broun, 1885
- Pycnomerus arizonicus Stephan, 1989
- Pycnomerus biimpressus Reiter, 1877
- Pycnomerus borbonicus Dajoz, 1989
- Pycnomerus corpulentus (Reitter, 1877)
- Pycnomerus fuliginosus Erichson, 1842
- Pycnomerus haematodes (Fabricius, 1801)
- Pycnomerus inexpectus Jacquelin du Val, 1859
- Pycnomerus inexspectus Jacquelin du Val, 1858
- Pycnomerus infimus (Grouvelle, 1902)
- Pycnomerus italicus (Ganglbauer, 1899)
- Pycnomerus nevermanni Hinton
- Pycnomerus prebblei
- Pycnomerus quercus Stephan, 1989
- Pycnomerus reflexus (Say, 1826)
- Pycnomerus rimatara
- Pycnomerus rufescens Broun, 1882
- Pycnomerus rufipennis (Montrouzier, 1861)
- Pycnomerus sculpturatus Sharp, 1885
- Pycnomerus sexualis Hinton
- Pycnomerus sharpi Hetschko, 1928
- Pycnomerus simukovi Alekseev, 2015
- Pycnomerus stenosoma Champion
- Pycnomerus sulcicollis LeConte, 1863
- Pycnomerus thrinax Ivie & Slipinski, 2000
- Pycnomerus uniformis Ivie & Slipinski, 1989
- Pycnomerus valentinei Ivie & Slipinski
