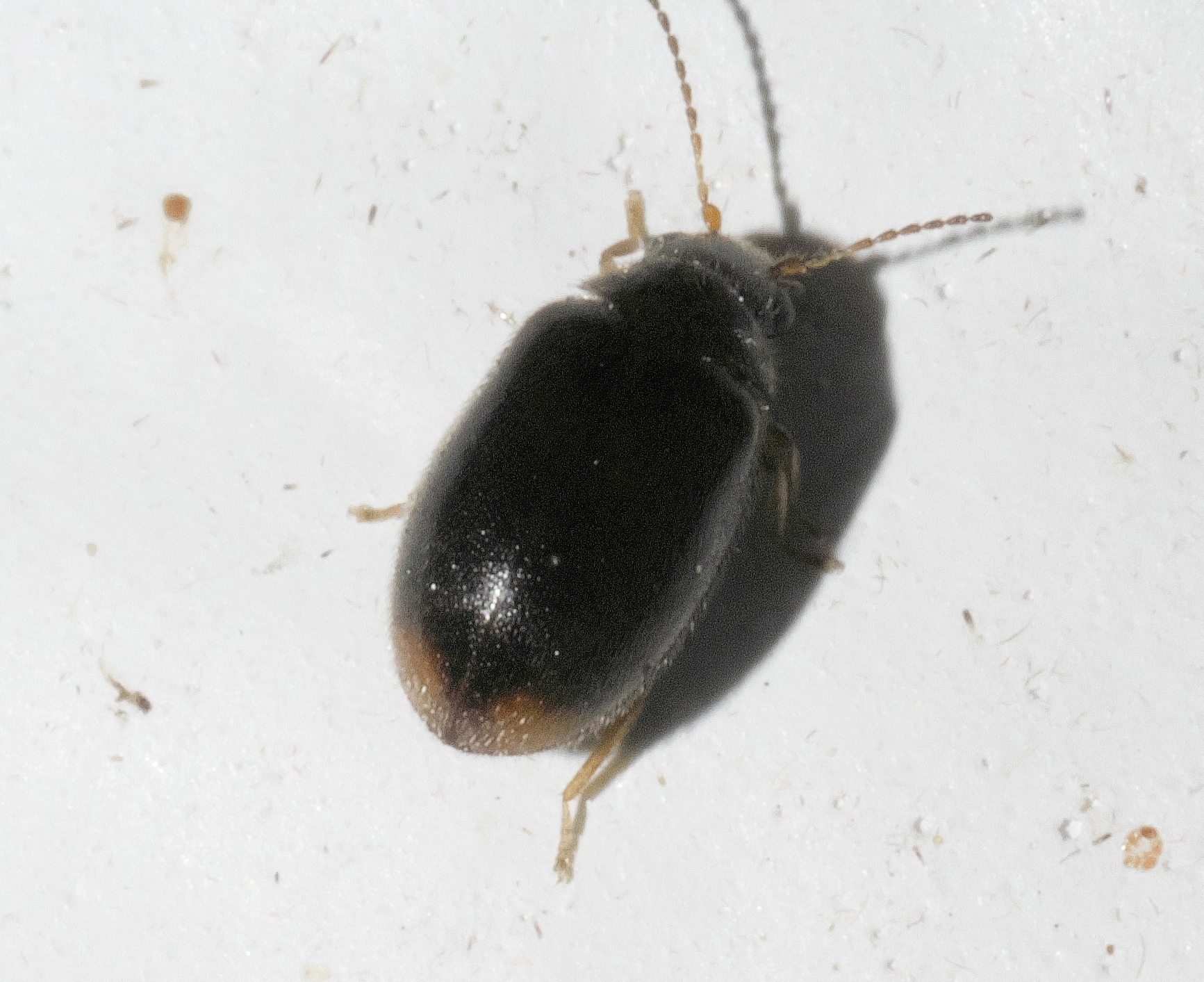
- Contacyphon pusillus, Oklahoma

Scientific classification
- Kingdom: Animalia
- Phylum: Arthropoda
- Class: Insecta
- Order: Coleoptera
- Suborder: Polyphaga
- Infraorder: Elateriformia
- Family: Scirtidae
- Genus: Contacyphon
- Species: C. pusillus

Binomial name
- Contacyphon pusillus (LeConte, 1853)

Synonyms
- Cyphon neopadi Klausnitzer, 1976; Contacyphon neopadi (Klausnitzer, 1976)

= Contacyphon pusillus =

Species of beetle

Contacyphon pusillus is a species of marsh beetle in the family Scirtidae. It is found in North America from British Columbia east to Quebec and south to Florida. Contacyphon neopadi was synonymized with C. pusillus and all previously documented occurrences of C. padi in North America are now considered to be this species.
