= Elodes apicalis =

Scientific classification
- Domain: Eukaryota
- Kingdom: Animalia
- Phylum: Arthropoda
- Class: Insecta
- Order: Coleoptera
- Suborder: Polyphaga
- Infraorder: Elateriformia
- Family: Scirtidae
- Genus: Elodes
- Species: E. apicalis

Binomial name
- Elodes apicalis (LeConte, 1866)

Species of beetle

Elodes apicalis is a species of marsh beetle in the family Scirtidae. It is found in North America.
