= Elodes maculicollis =

Scientific classification
- Domain: Eukaryota
- Kingdom: Animalia
- Phylum: Arthropoda
- Class: Insecta
- Order: Coleoptera
- Suborder: Polyphaga
- Infraorder: Elateriformia
- Family: Scirtidae
- Genus: Elodes
- Species: E. maculicollis

Binomial name
- Elodes maculicollis Horn, 1880

Species of beetle

Elodes maculicollis is a species of marsh beetle in the family Scirtidae. It is found in North America.
