= Contacyphon cooperi =

Scientific classification
- Domain: Eukaryota
- Kingdom: Animalia
- Phylum: Arthropoda
- Class: Insecta
- Order: Coleoptera
- Suborder: Polyphaga
- Infraorder: Elateriformia
- Family: Scirtidae
- Genus: Contacyphon
- Species: C. cooperi

Binomial name
- Contacyphon cooperi (Schaeffer, 1931)

Synonyms
- Cyphon cooperi Schaeffer, 1931

Species of beetle

Contacyphon cooperi is a species of marsh beetle in the family Scirtidae. It is found in North America.
