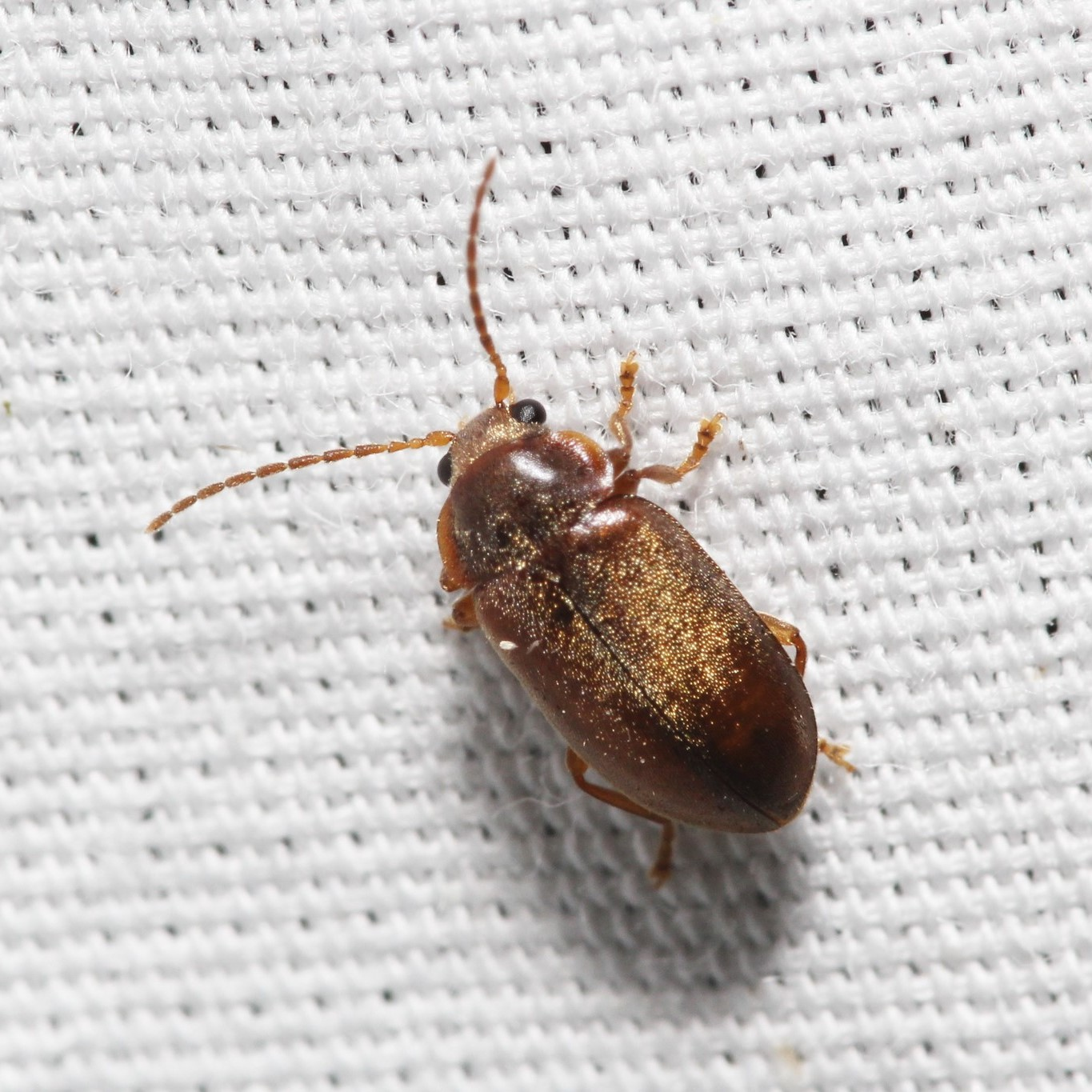

Scientific classification
- Kingdom: Animalia
- Phylum: Arthropoda
- Class: Insecta
- Order: Coleoptera
- Suborder: Polyphaga
- Infraorder: Elateriformia
- Family: Scirtidae
- Genus: Microcara
- Species: M. explanata

Binomial name
- Microcara explanata (LeConte, 1866)

= Microcara explanata =

Species of beetle

Microcara explanata is a species of marsh beetle in the family Scirtidae. It is found in North America.
