= Herthania concinna =

Scientific classification
- Domain: Eukaryota
- Kingdom: Animalia
- Phylum: Arthropoda
- Class: Insecta
- Order: Coleoptera
- Suborder: Polyphaga
- Infraorder: Elateriformia
- Family: Scirtidae
- Genus: Herthania
- Species: H. concinna

Binomial name
- Herthania concinna (LeConte, 1853)

Synonyms
- Cyphon concinnus (LeConte, 1853)

Species of beetle

Herthania concinna is a species of marsh beetle in the family Scirtidae. It is found in North America.
