= Alpestriscyphon spurgeon =

Scientific classification
- Domain: Eukaryota
- Kingdom: Animalia
- Phylum: Arthropoda
- Class: Insecta
- Order: Coleoptera
- Suborder: Polyphaga
- Infraorder: Elateriformia
- Family: Scirtidae
- Genus: Alpestriscyphon
- Species: A. spurgeon

Binomial name
- Alpestriscyphon spurgeon Watts, Bradford, Cooper & Libonatti, 2020

Species of diving beetle

Alpestriscyphon spurgeon is a species of freshwater diving beetle in the family Scirtidae, first described in 2020 by Chris Watts and others. This beetle is only found in the wet tropics of Queensland.
