= Alpestriscyphon bartlefrere =

Scientific classification
- Domain: Eukaryota
- Kingdom: Animalia
- Phylum: Arthropoda
- Class: Insecta
- Order: Coleoptera
- Suborder: Polyphaga
- Infraorder: Elateriformia
- Family: Scirtidae
- Genus: Alpestriscyphon
- Species: A. bartlefrere

Binomial name
- Alpestriscyphon bartlefrere Watts, Bradford, Cooper & Libonatti, 2020

Species of diving beetle

Alpestriscyphon bartlefrere is a species of freshwater diving beetle in the family Scirtidae, first described in 2020 by Chris Watts and others.

It is named for Mount Bartle Frere in Queensland, where the paratypes were found.
