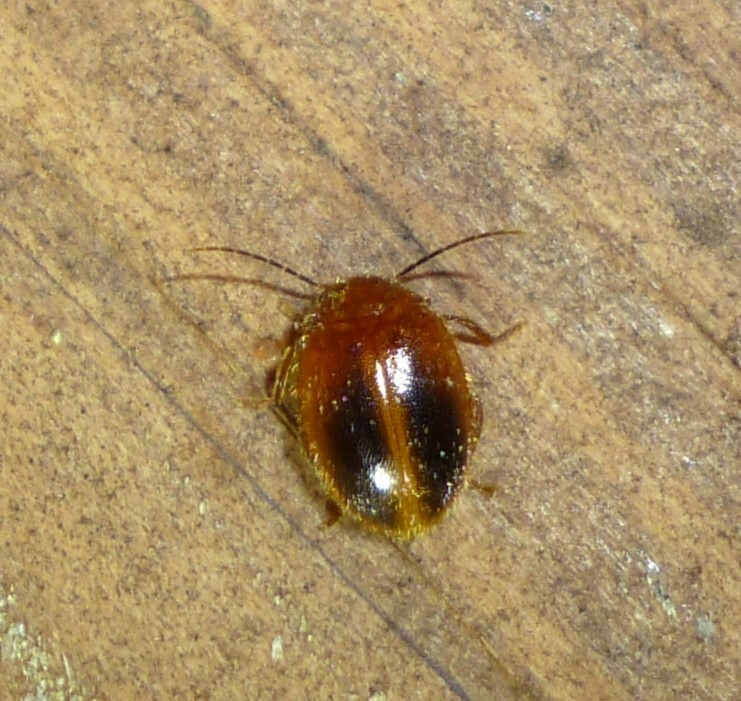

Scientific classification
- Domain: Eukaryota
- Kingdom: Animalia
- Phylum: Arthropoda
- Class: Insecta
- Order: Coleoptera
- Suborder: Polyphaga
- Infraorder: Elateriformia
- Family: Scirtidae
- Genus: Prionocyphon
- Species: P. limbatus

Binomial name
- Prionocyphon limbatus LeConte, 1866

= Prionocyphon limbatus =

Species of beetle

Prionocyphon limbatus is a species of marsh beetle in the family Scirtidae. It is found in eastern North America.
