= Sacodes fuscipennis =

Scientific classification
- Kingdom: Animalia
- Phylum: Arthropoda
- Clade: Pancrustacea
- Class: Insecta
- Order: Coleoptera
- Suborder: Polyphaga
- Infraorder: Elateriformia
- Family: Scirtidae
- Genus: Sacodes
- Species: S. fuscipennis

Binomial name
- Sacodes fuscipennis (Guérin-Méneville, 1843)

Synonyms
- Elodes fuscipennis Guérin-Méneville, 1843

Species of beetle

Sacodes fuscipennis is a species of marsh beetle in the family Scirtidae. It is found in the eastern United States.
