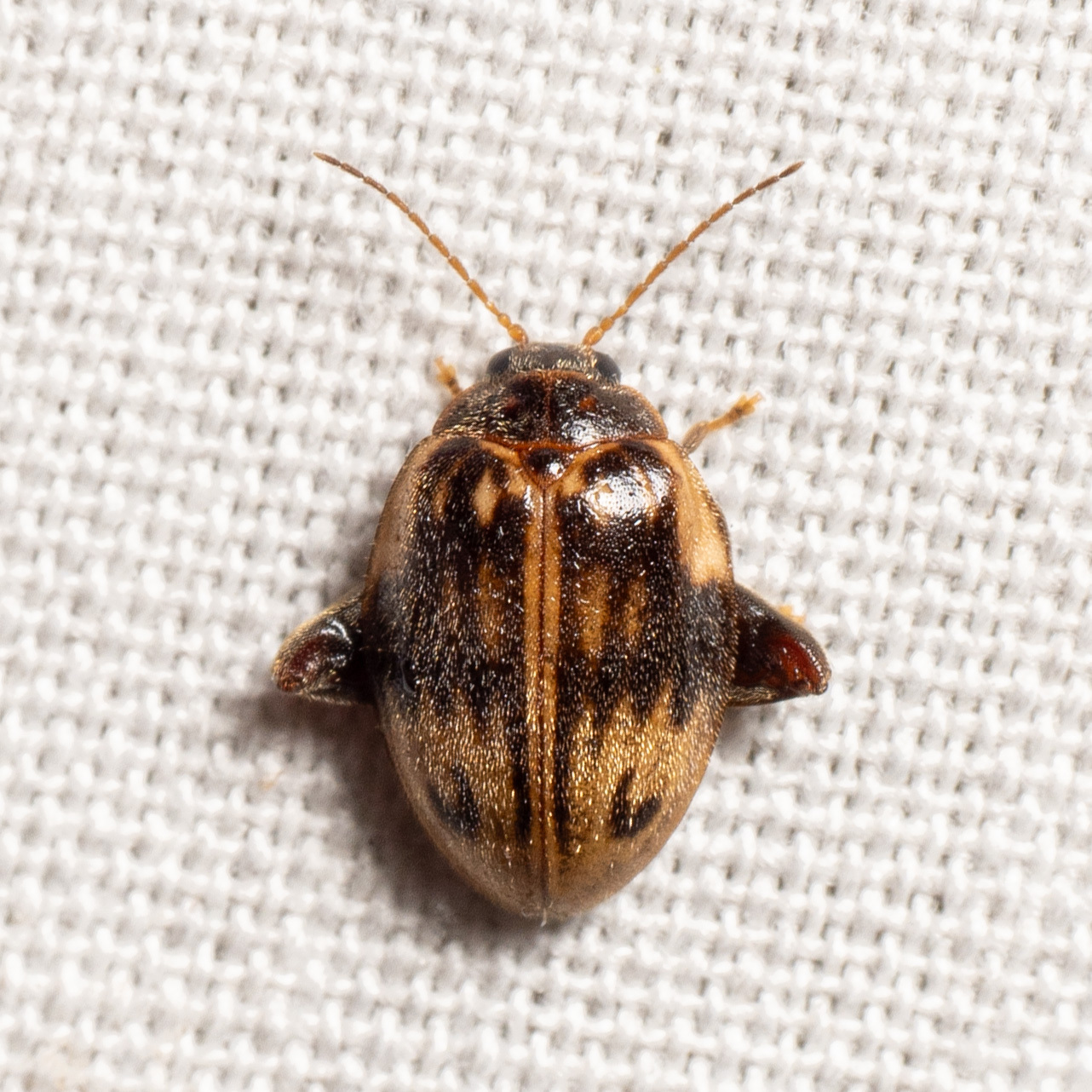

Scientific classification
- Domain: Eukaryota
- Kingdom: Animalia
- Phylum: Arthropoda
- Class: Insecta
- Order: Coleoptera
- Suborder: Polyphaga
- Infraorder: Elateriformia
- Family: Scirtidae
- Genus: Ora
- Species: O. texana

Binomial name
- Ora texana Champion, 1897

= Ora texana =

Species of beetle

Ora texana, the Texas flea marsh beetle, is a species of marsh beetle in the family Scirtidae. It is found from Virginia to Texas in the United States south to Costa Rica.
