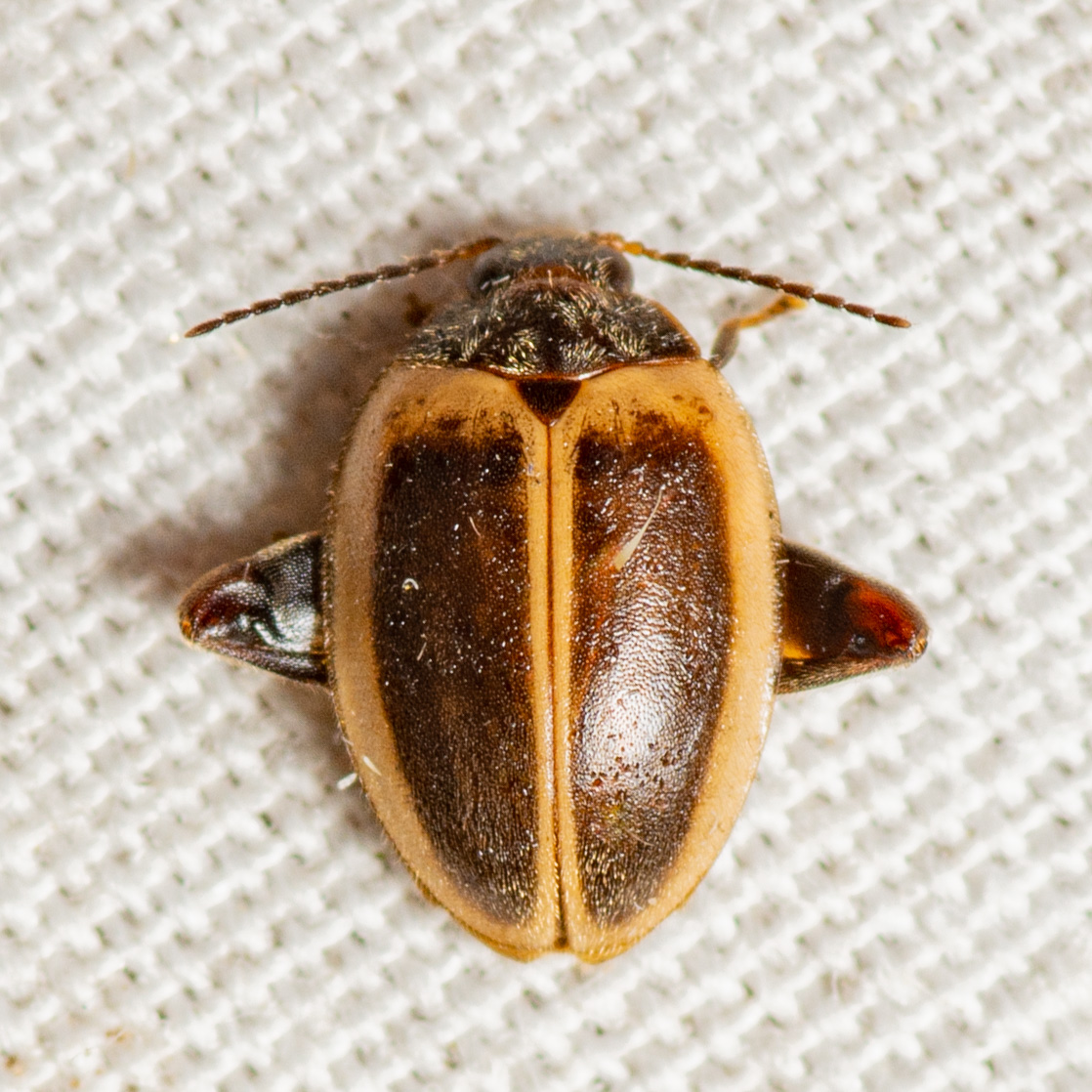

Scientific classification
- Domain: Eukaryota
- Kingdom: Animalia
- Phylum: Arthropoda
- Class: Insecta
- Order: Coleoptera
- Suborder: Polyphaga
- Infraorder: Elateriformia
- Family: Scirtidae
- Genus: Ora
- Species: O. discoidea

Binomial name
- Ora discoidea Champion, 1897

= Ora discoidea =

Species of beetle

Ora discoidea is a species of marsh beetle in the family Scirtidae. It is found in Central America and North America from Texas to Florida.
