= Ora troberti =

Scientific classification
- Kingdom: Animalia
- Phylum: Arthropoda
- Clade: Pancrustacea
- Class: Insecta
- Order: Coleoptera
- Suborder: Polyphaga
- Infraorder: Elateriformia
- Family: Scirtidae
- Genus: Ora
- Species: O. troberti

Binomial name
- Ora troberti (Guérin-Méneville, 1861)

Species of beetle

Ora troberti is a species of marsh beetle in the family Scirtidae. It is found in Florida and Texas in the United States south through Central America.
