= Nyholmia confusa =

Scientific classification
- Domain: Eukaryota
- Kingdom: Animalia
- Phylum: Arthropoda
- Class: Insecta
- Order: Coleoptera
- Suborder: Polyphaga
- Infraorder: Elateriformia
- Family: Scirtidae
- Genus: Nyholmia
- Species: N. confusa

Binomial name
- Nyholmia confusa (Brown, 1930)

Synonyms
- Cyphon confusus Brown, 1930; Cyphon horioni Klausnitzer, 1976

Species of beetle

Nyholmia confusa is a species of marsh beetle in the family Scirtidae. It is found in North America.
