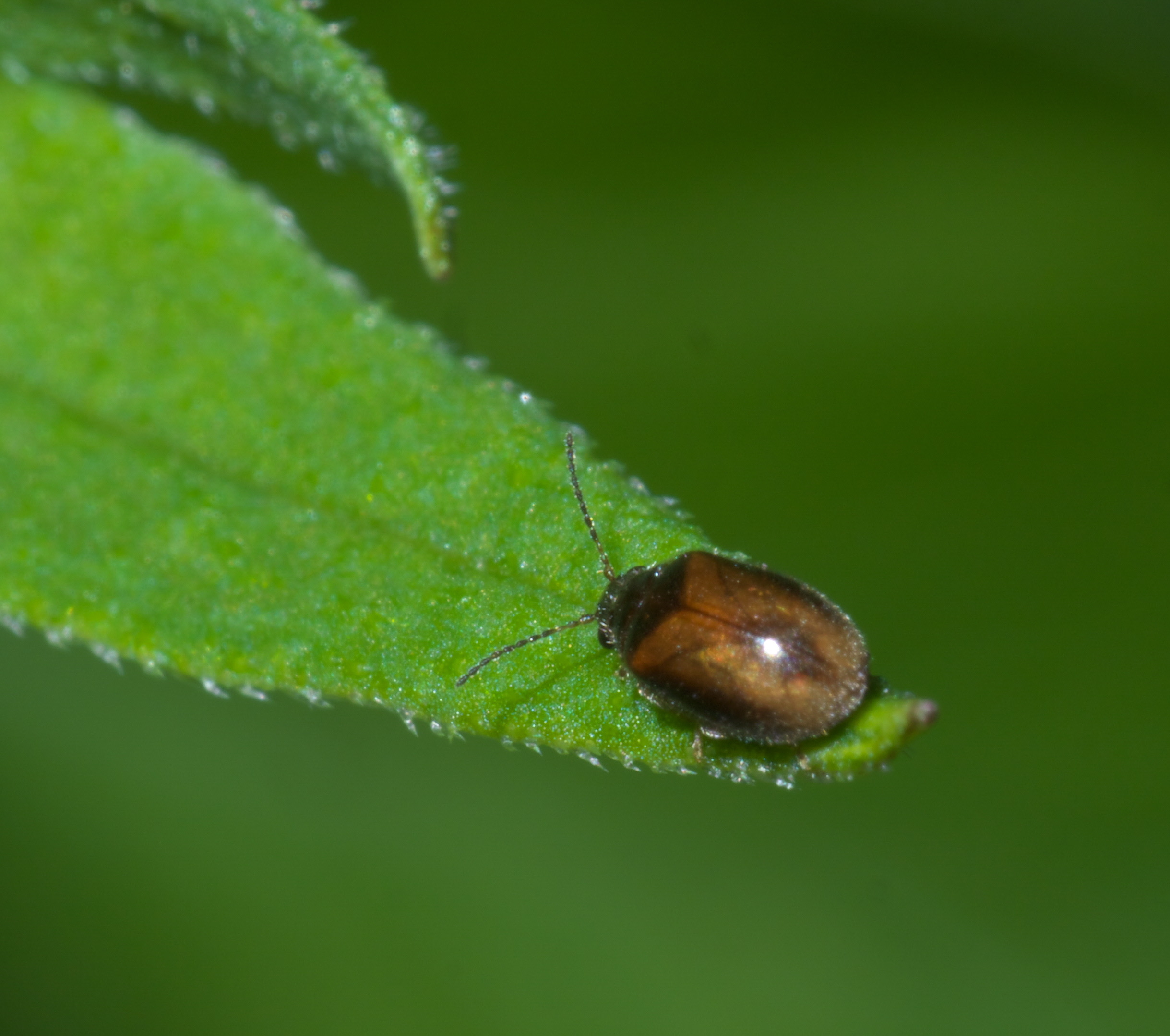

Scientific classification
- Domain: Eukaryota
- Kingdom: Animalia
- Phylum: Arthropoda
- Class: Insecta
- Order: Coleoptera
- Suborder: Polyphaga
- Infraorder: Elateriformia
- Family: Scirtidae
- Genus: Contacyphon; Des Gozis, 1886

Synonyms
- Cyphon of authors, not of Paykull, 1799 (junior synonym of Elodes Latreille, 1796)

= Contacyphon =

Genus of beetles

Contacyphon is a genus of marsh beetles in the family Scirtidae. There are over 100 described species in Contacyphon, all of which were formerly treated under the deprecated name Cyphon, which was recognized as an objectively invalid name.

== Selected species ==
- Contacyphon americanus (Pic, 1913)
- Contacyphon arcuatus (Hatch, 1962)
- Contacyphon coarctatus (Paykull, 1799)
- Contacyphon cooperi (Schaeffer, 1931)
- Contacyphon exiguus (Horn, 1880)
- Contacyphon fuscescens (Klausnitzer, 1976)
- Contacyphon johni (Klausnitzer, 1976)
- Contacyphon kongsbergensis (Munster, 1923)
- Contacyphon modestus (LeConte, 1853)
- Contacyphon neovariabilis (Klausnitzer, 1976)
- Contacyphon obscurellus (Klausnitzer, 1976)
- Contacyphon ochreatus (Klausnitzer, 1976)
- Contacyphon padi (Linnaeus, 1758)
- Contacyphon perplexus (Blatchley, 1914)
- Contacyphon pubescens (Fabricius, 1792)
- Contacyhphon punctatus (LeConte, 1853)
- Contacyphon pusillus (LeConte, 1853)
- Contacyphon setulipennis (Klausnitzer, 1976)
- Contacyphon variabilis (Thunberg, 1785)
