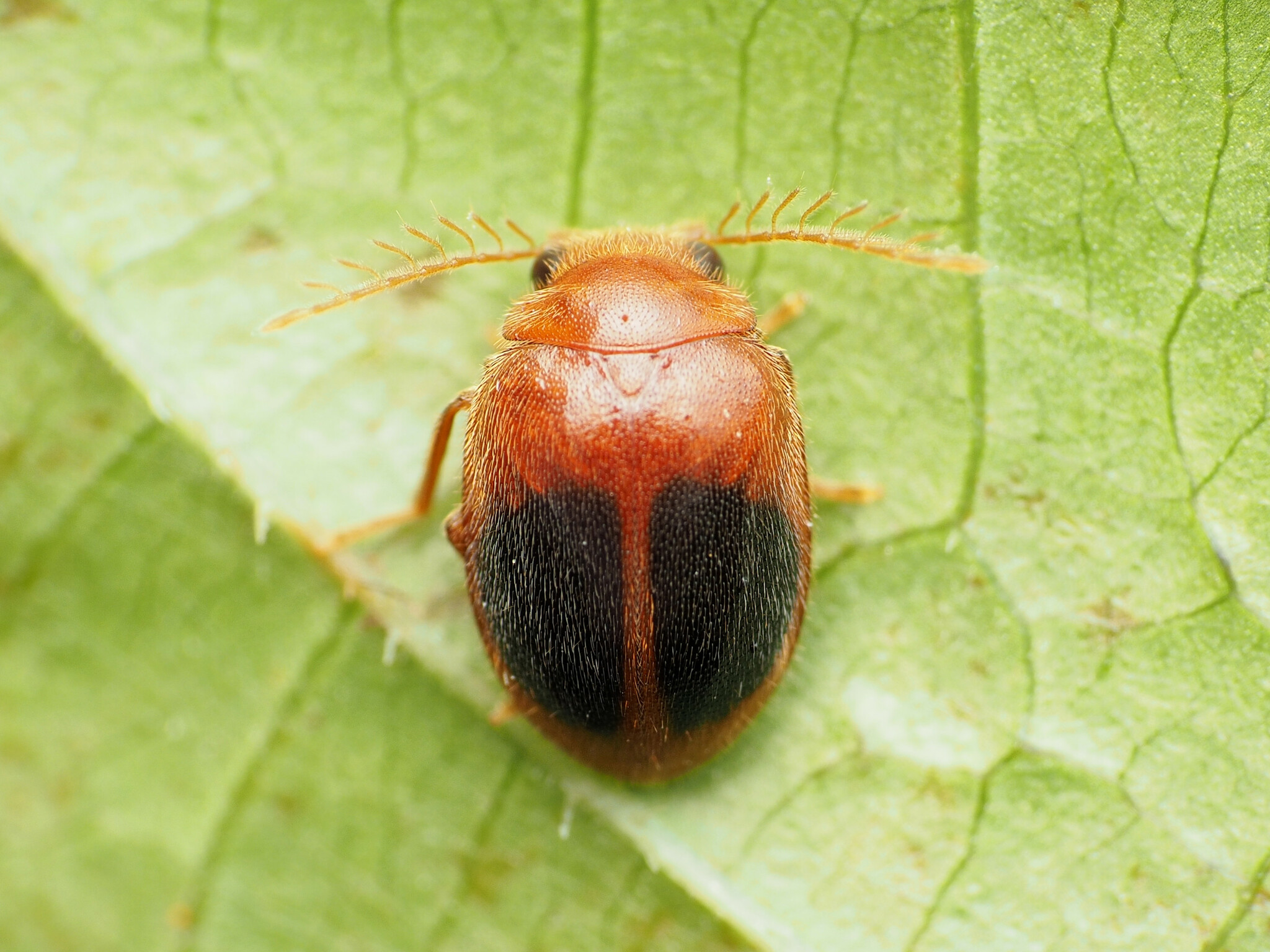
- Adult male P. discoideus

Scientific classification
- Domain: Eukaryota
- Kingdom: Animalia
- Phylum: Arthropoda
- Class: Insecta
- Order: Coleoptera
- Suborder: Polyphaga
- Infraorder: Elateriformia
- Family: Scirtidae
- Genus: Prionocyphon
- Species: P. discoideus

Binomial name
- Prionocyphon discoideus (Say, 1825)

= Prionocyphon discoideus =

Species of beetle

Prionocyphon discoideus is a species of marsh beetle in the family Scirtidae. It is found in eastern North America.

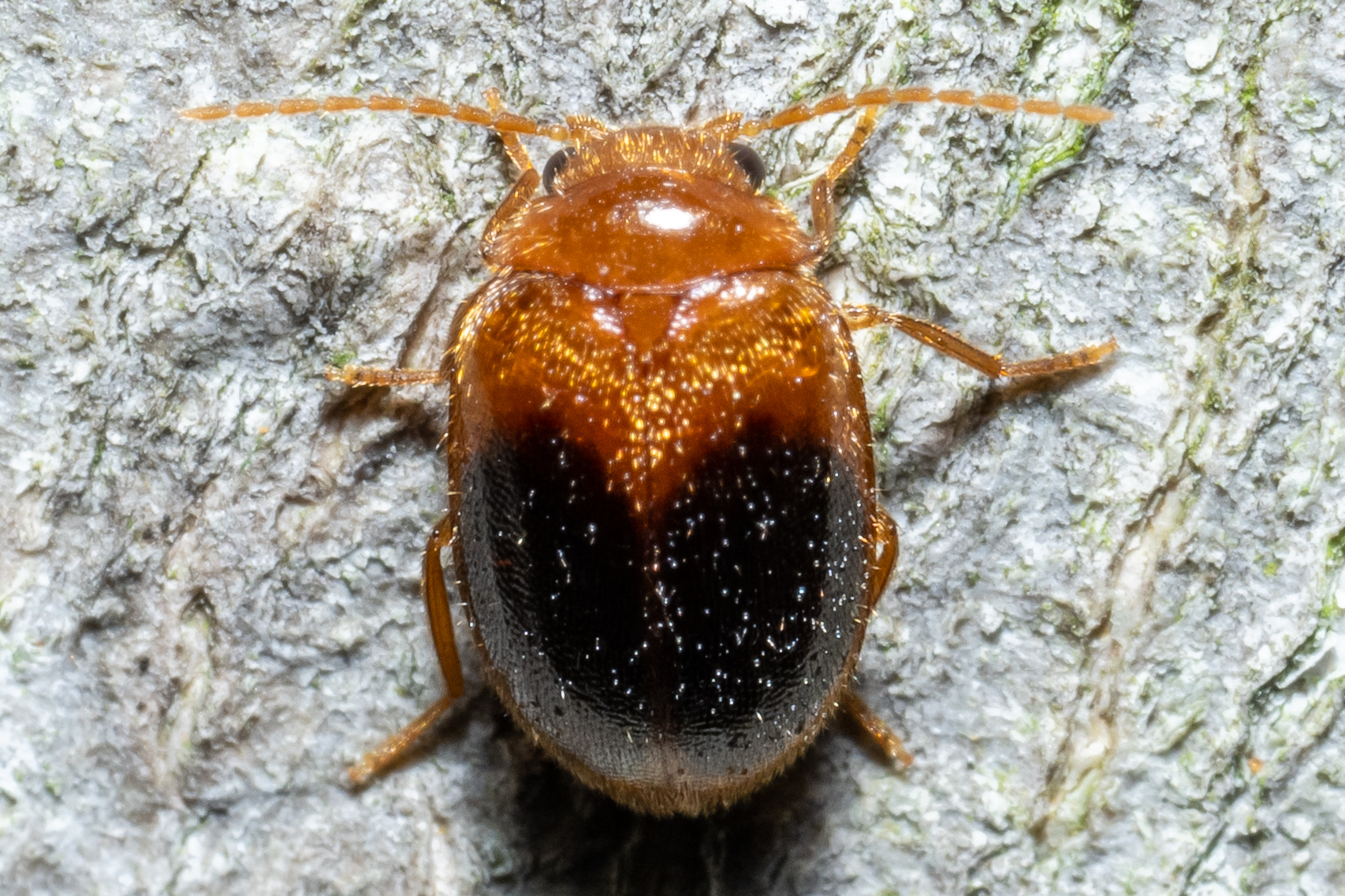
Adult female
