= Scirtes goliai =

Scientific classification
- Domain: Eukaryota
- Kingdom: Animalia
- Phylum: Arthropoda
- Class: Insecta
- Order: Coleoptera
- Suborder: Polyphaga
- Infraorder: Elateriformia
- Family: Scirtidae
- Genus: Scirtes
- Species: S. goliai

Binomial name
- Scirtes goliai Epler, 2012

Species of beetle

Scirtes goliai is a species of marsh beetle in the family Scirtidae. It was described based on specimens from southern Florida, the Cayman Islands, and the Bahamas and is expected to generally occur in the Caribbean bioregion.
