= Contacyphon variabilis =

Scientific classification
- Kingdom: Animalia
- Phylum: Arthropoda
- Clade: Pancrustacea
- Class: Insecta
- Order: Coleoptera
- Suborder: Polyphaga
- Infraorder: Elateriformia
- Family: Scirtidae
- Genus: Contacyphon
- Species: C. variabilis

Binomial name
- Contacyphon variabilis (Thunberg, 1785)

Synonyms
- Cyphon punctatus (LeConte, 1853)

Species of beetle

Contacyphon variabilis is a species of marsh beetle in the family Scirtidae. It is found in Europe, Northern Asia, and North America.
