= Scirtes plagiatus =

Scientific classification
- Domain: Eukaryota
- Kingdom: Animalia
- Phylum: Arthropoda
- Class: Insecta
- Order: Coleoptera
- Suborder: Polyphaga
- Infraorder: Elateriformia
- Family: Scirtidae
- Genus: Scirtes
- Species: S. plagiatus

Binomial name
- Scirtes plagiatus Schaeffer, 1906

Species of beetle

Scirtes plagiatus is a species of marsh beetle in the family Scirtidae. It is found in North America.
