= Contacyphon americanus =

Scientific classification
- Kingdom: Animalia
- Phylum: Arthropoda
- Class: Insecta
- Order: Coleoptera
- Suborder: Polyphaga
- Infraorder: Elateriformia
- Family: Scirtidae
- Genus: Contacyphon
- Species: C. americanus

Binomial name
- Contacyphon americanus (Pic, 1913)

Synonyms
- Cyphon americanus Pic, 1913

Species of beetle

Contacyphon americanus is a species of marsh beetle in the family Scirtidae. It is found in North America.
