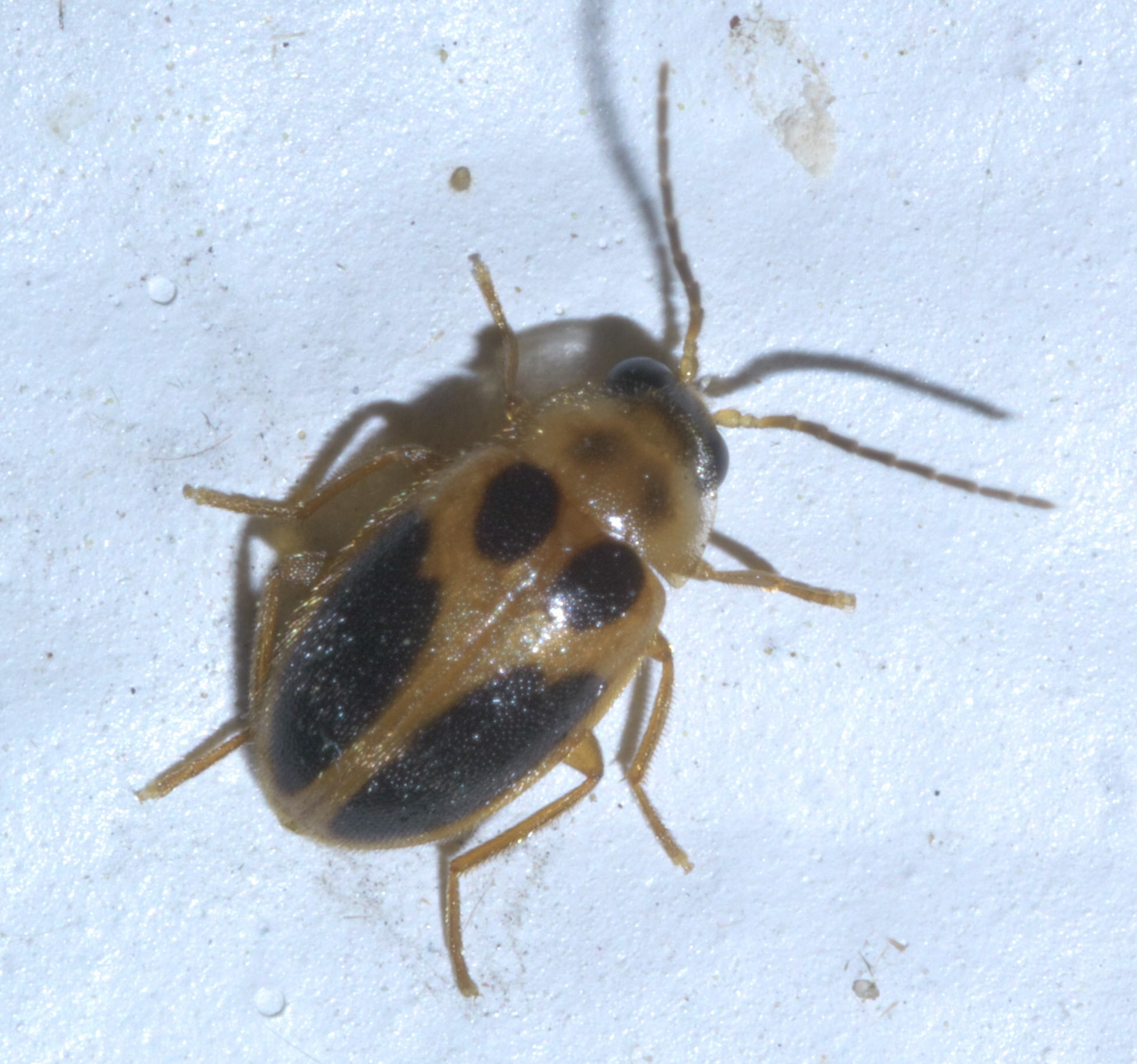

Scientific classification
- Kingdom: Animalia
- Phylum: Arthropoda
- Clade: Pancrustacea
- Class: Insecta
- Order: Coleoptera
- Suborder: Polyphaga
- Infraorder: Elateriformia
- Family: Scirtidae
- Genus: Sacodes
- Species: S. pulchella

Binomial name
- Sacodes pulchella (Guérin-Méneville, 1843)

Synonyms
- Elodes pulchella Guérin-Méneville, 1843

= Sacodes pulchella =

Species of beetle

Sacodes pulchella, the beautiful marsh beetle, is a species of marsh beetle in the family Scirtidae. It is found in the eastern and central United States and southeastern Canada.

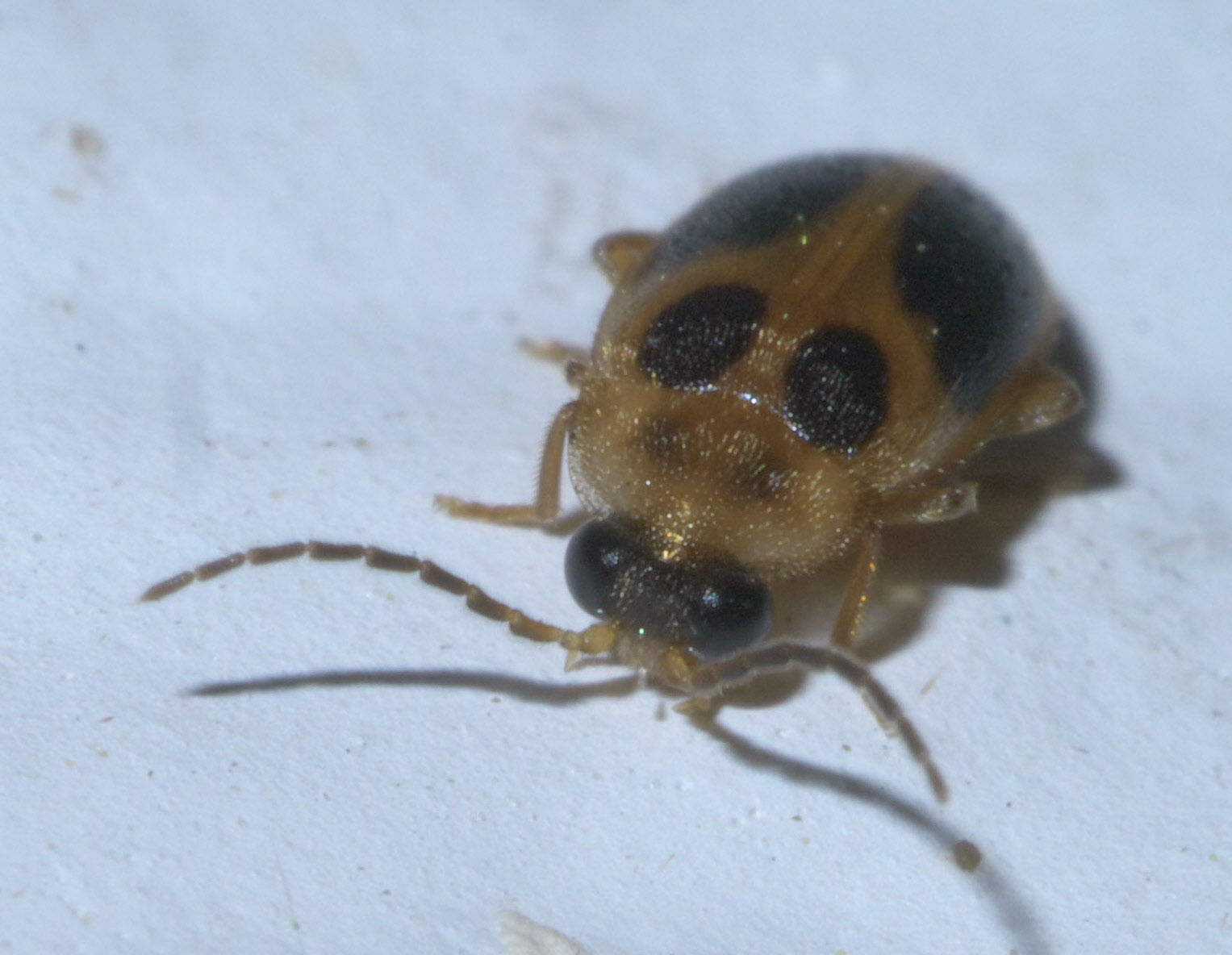
Beautiful marsh beetle, Sacodes pulchella
