= Nyholmia collaris =

Scientific classification
- Kingdom: Animalia
- Phylum: Arthropoda
- Clade: Pancrustacea
- Class: Insecta
- Order: Coleoptera
- Suborder: Polyphaga
- Infraorder: Elateriformia
- Family: Scirtidae
- Genus: Nyholmia
- Species: N. collaris

Binomial name
- Nyholmia collaris (Guérin-Méneville, 1843)

Species of beetle

Nyholmia collaris is a species of marsh beetle in the family Scirtidae. It is found in North America.
