= Ora hyacintha =

Scientific classification
- Domain: Eukaryota
- Kingdom: Animalia
- Phylum: Arthropoda
- Class: Insecta
- Order: Coleoptera
- Suborder: Polyphaga
- Infraorder: Elateriformia
- Family: Scirtidae
- Genus: Ora
- Species: O. hyacintha

Binomial name
- Ora hyacintha Blatchley, 1914

Species of beetle

Ora hyacintha is a species of marsh beetle in the family Scirtidae. It is only known to occur in Florida.
