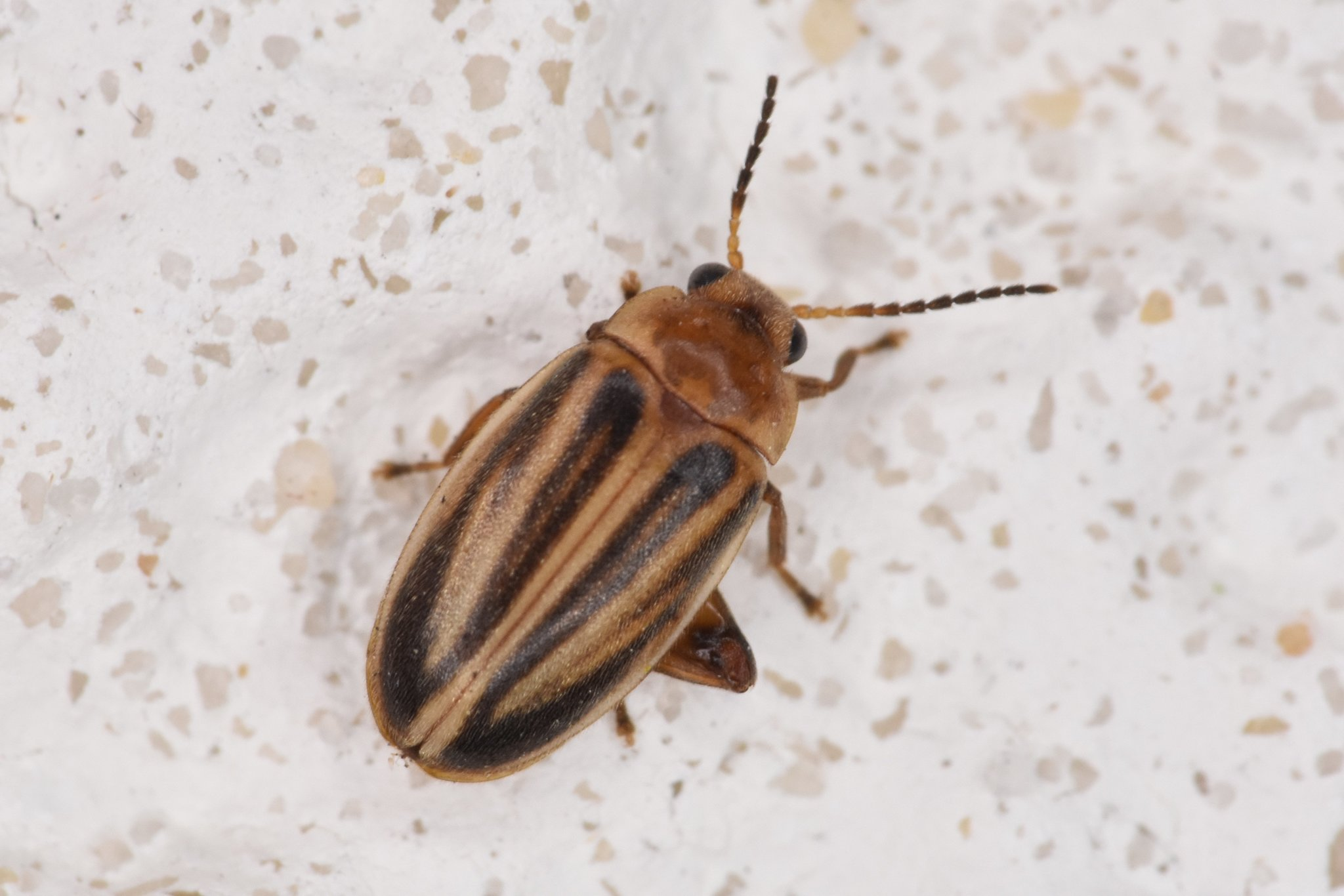

Scientific classification
- Kingdom: Animalia
- Phylum: Arthropoda
- Clade: Pancrustacea
- Class: Insecta
- Order: Coleoptera
- Suborder: Polyphaga
- Infraorder: Elateriformia
- Family: Scirtidae
- Genus: Scirtes
- Species: S. oblongus

Binomial name
- Scirtes oblongus Guérin-Méneville, 1861

= Scirtes oblongus =

Species of beetle

Scirtes oblongus is a species of marsh beetle in the family Scirtidae. It is found in North America.
