= Contacyphon perplexus =

Scientific classification
- Domain: Eukaryota
- Kingdom: Animalia
- Phylum: Arthropoda
- Class: Insecta
- Order: Coleoptera
- Suborder: Polyphaga
- Infraorder: Elateriformia
- Family: Scirtidae
- Genus: Contacyphon
- Species: C. perplexus

Binomial name
- Contacyphon perplexus (Blatchley, 1914)

Synonyms
- Cyphon perplexus Blatchley, 1914

Species of beetle

Contacyphon perplexus is a species of marsh beetle in the family Scirtidae. It is found in North America.
