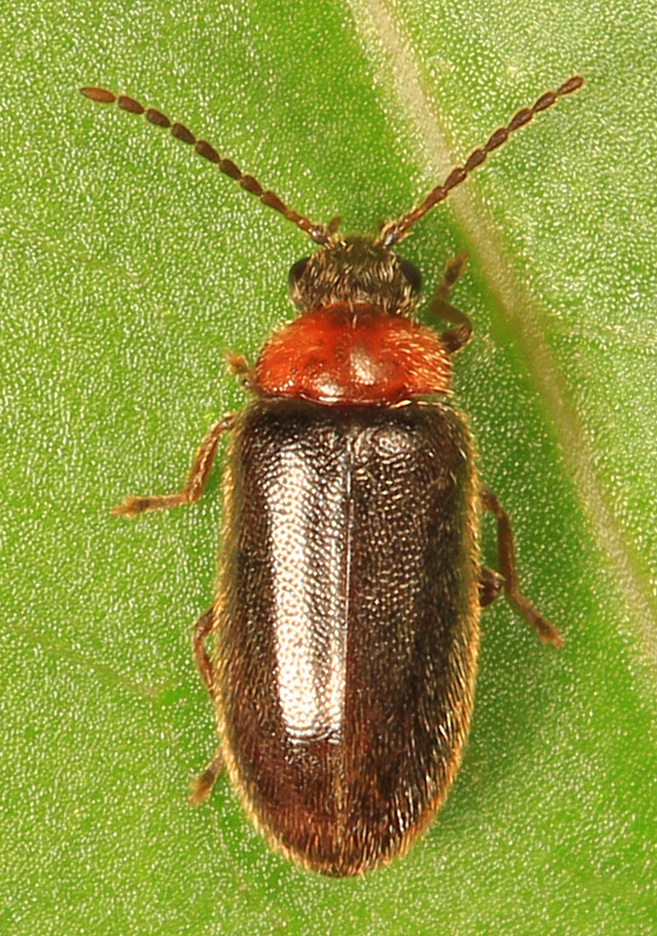

Scientific classification
- Kingdom: Animalia
- Phylum: Arthropoda
- Class: Insecta
- Order: Coleoptera
- Suborder: Polyphaga
- Infraorder: Elateriformia
- Family: Scirtidae
- Genus: Hemicyphon; LeConte, 1866
- Species: H. ruficollis

Binomial name
- Hemicyphon ruficollis (Say, 1825)

Synonyms
- Exneria ruficollis Cyphon ruficollis Lampyris ruficollis

= Hemicyphon =

Genus of beetles

Hemicyphon is a genus of marsh beetles in the family Scirtidae. There is one described species in Hemicyphon, Hemicyphon ruficollis, which occurs in eastern North America. The species was previously placed in Exneria and Cyphon. Hemicyphon was originally described as a subgenus of Cyphon by LeConte in 1866.
