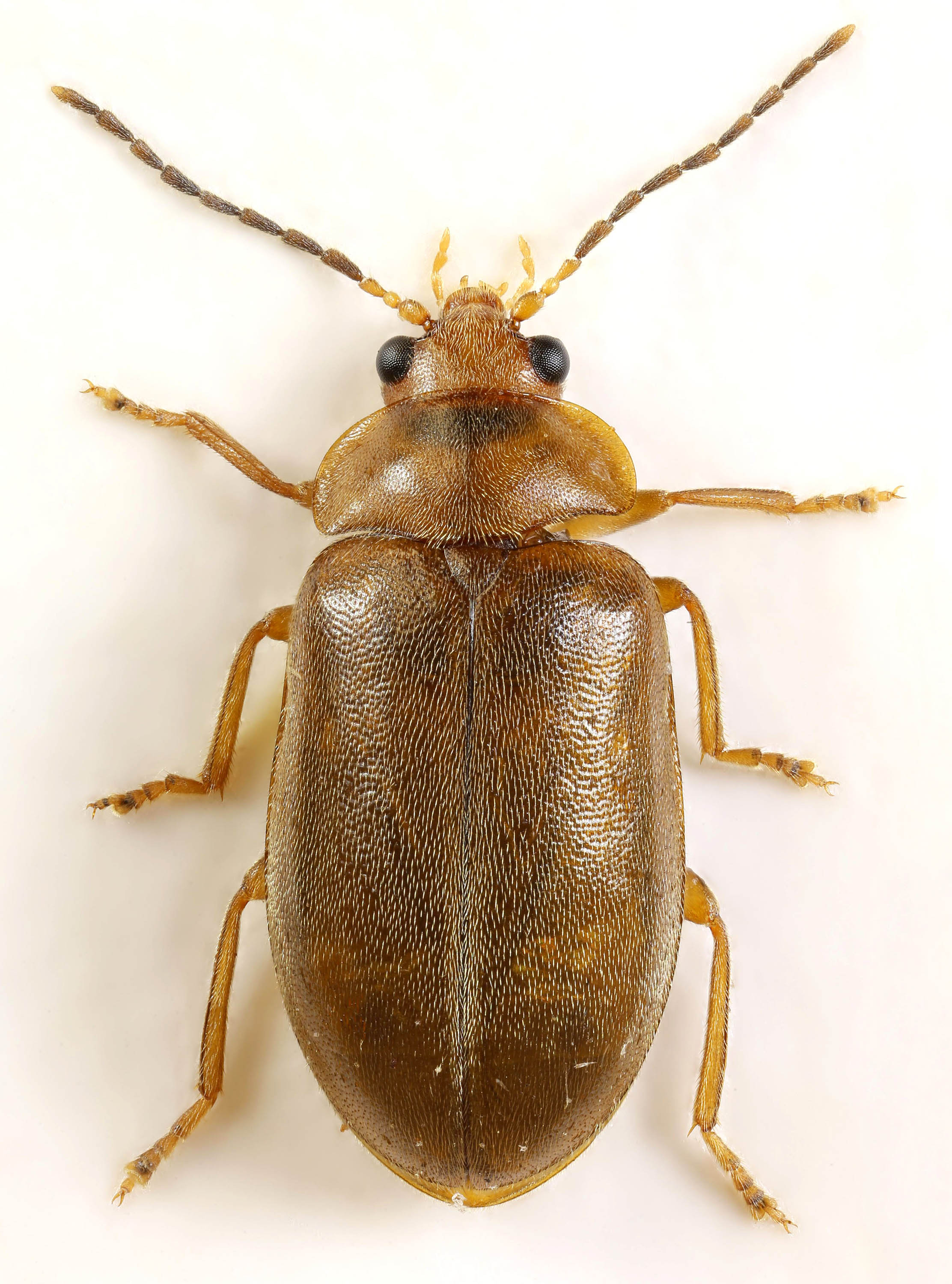
- Microcara testacea

Scientific classification
- Kingdom: Animalia
- Phylum: Arthropoda
- Class: Insecta
- Order: Coleoptera
- Suborder: Polyphaga
- Infraorder: Elateriformia
- Family: Scirtidae
- Genus: Microcara; Thomson, 1859

= Microcara =

Genus of beetles

Microcara is a genus of marsh beetles in the family Scirtidae. There are about 10 described species in Microcara.

== Species ==
These 10 species belong to the genus Microcara:

- Microcara dispar Seidlitz, 1872
- Microcara dufaui Legros, 1947
- Microcara explanata (LeConte, 1866)
- Microcara omissa Klausnitzer, 1972
- Microcara pilosula Reitter, 1911
- Microcara testacea (Linnaeus, 1767)
- † Microcara dokhturovi Yablokov-Khnzorian, 1960
- † Microcara kusnezovi Yablokov-Khnzorian, 1960
- † Microcara znojkoi Yablokov-Khnzorian, 1960
- † Microcara zubkovi Yablokov-Khnzorian, 1960
