= Alpestriscyphon =

Scientific classification
- Domain: Eukaryota
- Kingdom: Animalia
- Phylum: Arthropoda
- Class: Insecta
- Order: Coleoptera
- Suborder: Polyphaga
- Infraorder: Elateriformia
- Family: Scirtidae
- Genus: Alpestriscyphon; Watts, Bradford, Cooper & Libonatti, 2020

Genus of Scirtidae

Alpestriscyphon is a genus of marsh beetle in the Scirtidae family, first described in 2020 by Chris Watts and others. The type species is Alpestriscyphon spurgeon.

Species of this genus are found only in the wet tropics of Queensland, Australia.

== Species list ==
(listed as accepted)

- Alpestriscyphon bartlefrere Watts, Bradford, Cooper & Libonatti, 2020
- Alpestriscyphon spurgeon Watts, Bradford, Cooper & Libonatti, 2020
