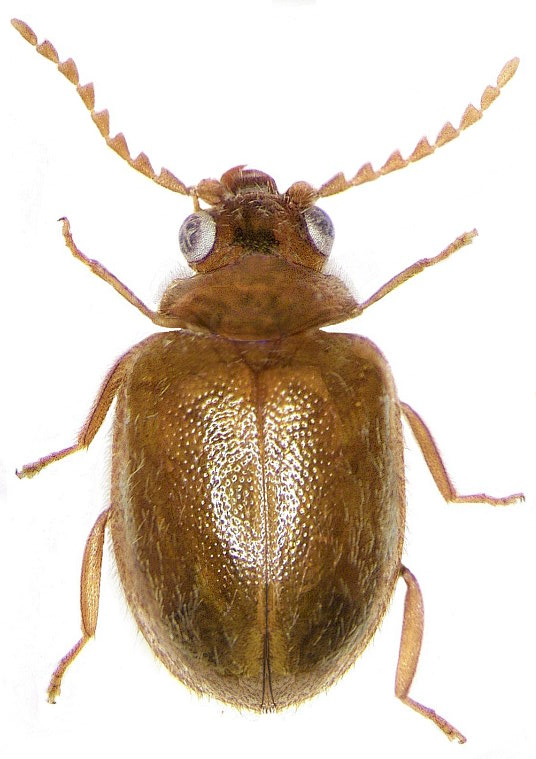
- Prionocyphon serricornis

Scientific classification
- Domain: Eukaryota
- Kingdom: Animalia
- Phylum: Arthropoda
- Class: Insecta
- Order: Coleoptera
- Suborder: Polyphaga
- Infraorder: Elateriformia
- Family: Scirtidae
- Genus: Prionocyphon; Redtenbacher, 1858

= Prionocyphon =

Genus of beetles

Prionocyphon is a genus of marsh beetles in the family Scirtidae. There are at least 20 described species in Prionocyphon.

== Species ==
These 20 species belong to the genus Prionocyphon:

- Orientoprionocyphon herthae Klausnitzer, 2009
- Orientoprionocyphon rutai Klausnitzer, 2009
- Orientoprionocyphon yoshitomii Klausnitzer, 2009
- Prionocyphon anticetestaceus Klausnitzer, 1976
- Prionocyphon costipennis Ruta, 2010
- Prionocyphon discoideus (Say, 1825)
- Prionocyphon fuscipennis Kiesenwetter, 1874
- Prionocyphon hemisphaerius Klausnitzer, 2013
- Prionocyphon laosensis Yoshitomi & Satô, 2003
- Prionocyphon limbatus LeConte, 1866
- Prionocyphon macrodascilloides Ruta, 2010
- Prionocyphon minusculus Klausnitzer, 1980
- Prionocyphon monteithi Watts, 2010
- Prionocyphon ornatus Abeille de Perrin, 1881
- Prionocyphon ovalis Kiesenwetter, 1874
- Prionocyphon ruthsteuerae Klausnitzer, 2009
- Prionocyphon serricornis (Müller, 1821)
- Prionocyphon sexmaculatus Lewis, 1895
- Prionocyphon umbratilis Klausnitzer, 1976
- Prionocyphon weigeli Klausnitzer, 2009
