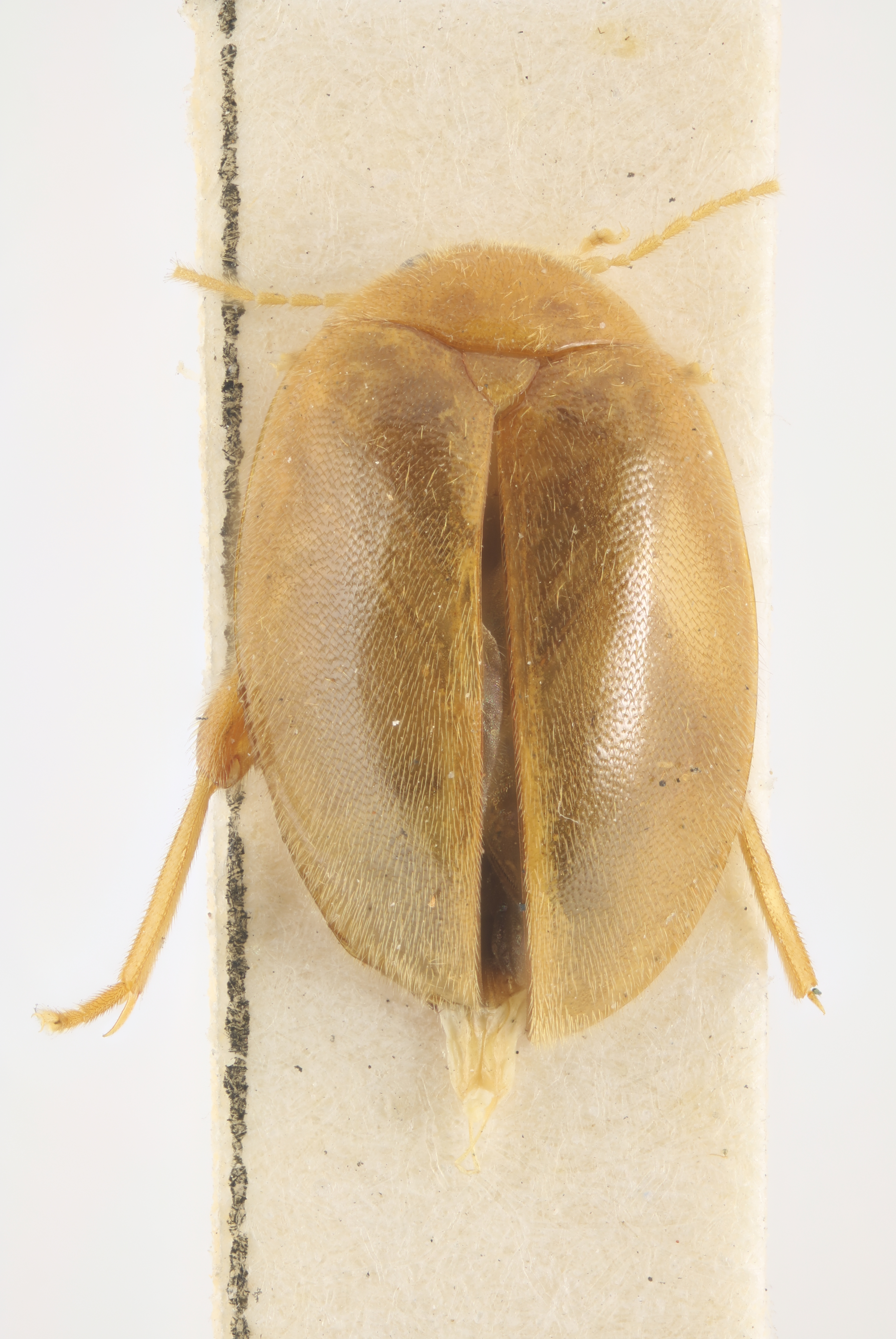
- Spumacinctus championi

Scientific classification
- Kingdom: Animalia
- Phylum: Arthropoda
- Clade: Pancrustacea
- Class: Insecta
- Order: Coleoptera
- Suborder: Polyphaga
- Infraorder: Elateriformia
- Family: Scirtidae
- Genus: Spumacinctus; Jorge, Libonatti, Benetti, & Hamada, 2026

= Spumacinctus =

Genus of beetles

Spumacinctus is a genus of beetles in the family Scirtidae with three described species that occur in the Neotropical realm.

== Species ==
These three species belong to the genus Spumacinctus:

- Spumacinctus championi (Picado, 1912)
- Spumacinctus mindu Jorge, Libonatti, Benetti, & Hamada, 2026
- Spumacinctus porcicaudalis Jorge, Libonatti, Benetti, & Hamada, 2026
