= Herthania =

Scientific classification
- Domain: Eukaryota
- Kingdom: Animalia
- Phylum: Arthropoda
- Class: Insecta
- Order: Coleoptera
- Suborder: Polyphaga
- Infraorder: Elateriformia
- Family: Scirtidae
- Genus: Herthania; Klausnitzer, 2006

Genus of beetles

Herthania is a genus of marsh beetles in the family Scirtidae. There are at least seven described species in Herthania.

== Species ==
These seven species belong to the genus Herthania in the Nearctic:

- Herthania cherokee Zwick, 2010
- Herthania compta (Klausnitzer, 1976)
- Herthania concinna (LeConte, 1853)
- Herthania confinis (Klausnitzer, 1976)
- Herthania exigua (Horn, 1880)
- Herthania obscura (Guérin-Méneville, 1843)
- Herthania yoshitomii Klausnitzer, 2016
