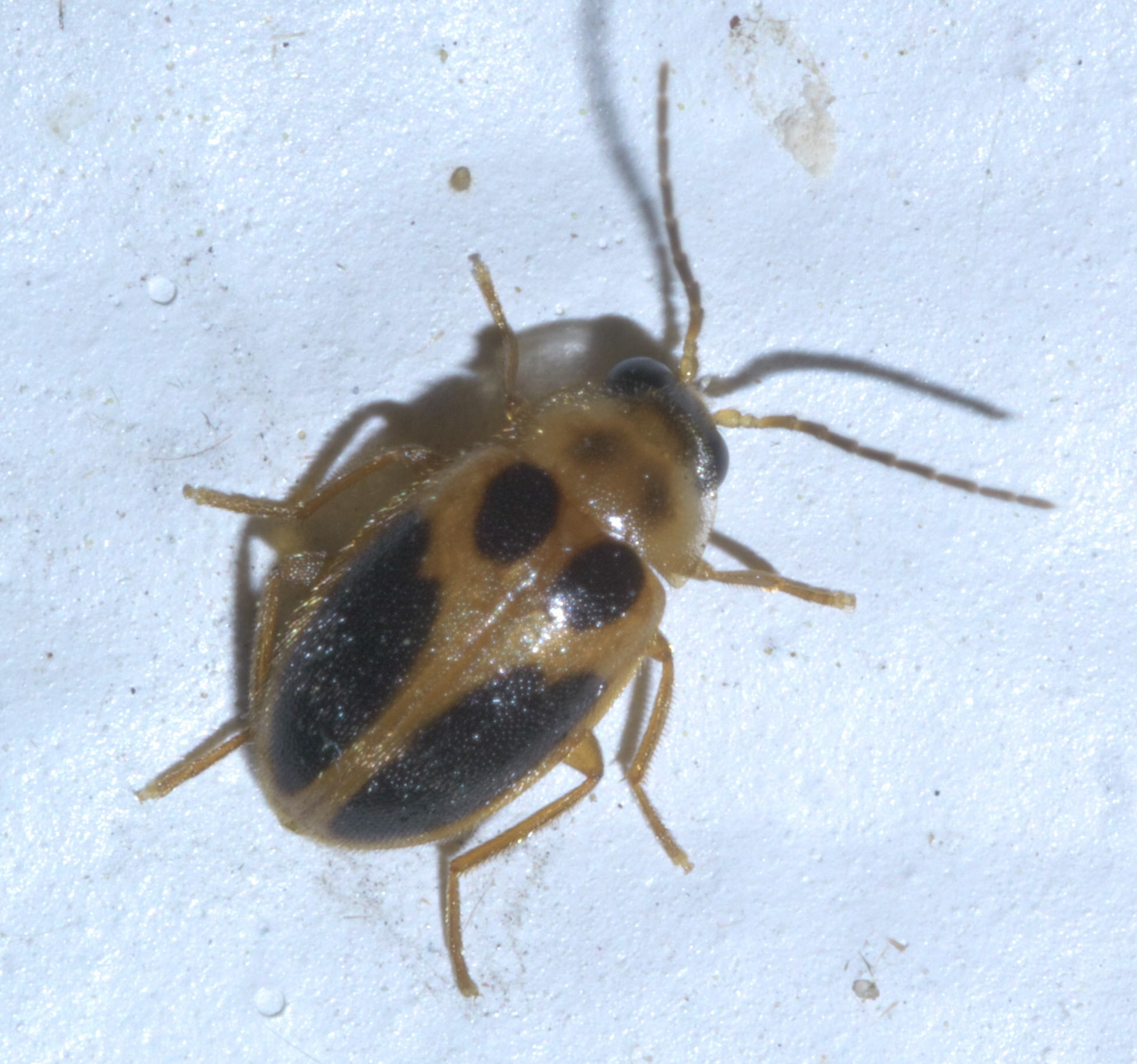
- Sacodes pulchella

Scientific classification
- Kingdom: Animalia
- Phylum: Arthropoda
- Class: Insecta
- Order: Coleoptera
- Suborder: Polyphaga
- Infraorder: Elateriformia
- Family: Scirtidae
- Genus: Sacodes; LeConte, 1853

Synonyms
- Flavohelodes Klausnitzer, 1980

= Sacodes =

Genus of beetles

Sacodes is a genus of marsh beetles in the family Scirtidae. There are about seven described species in Sacodes.

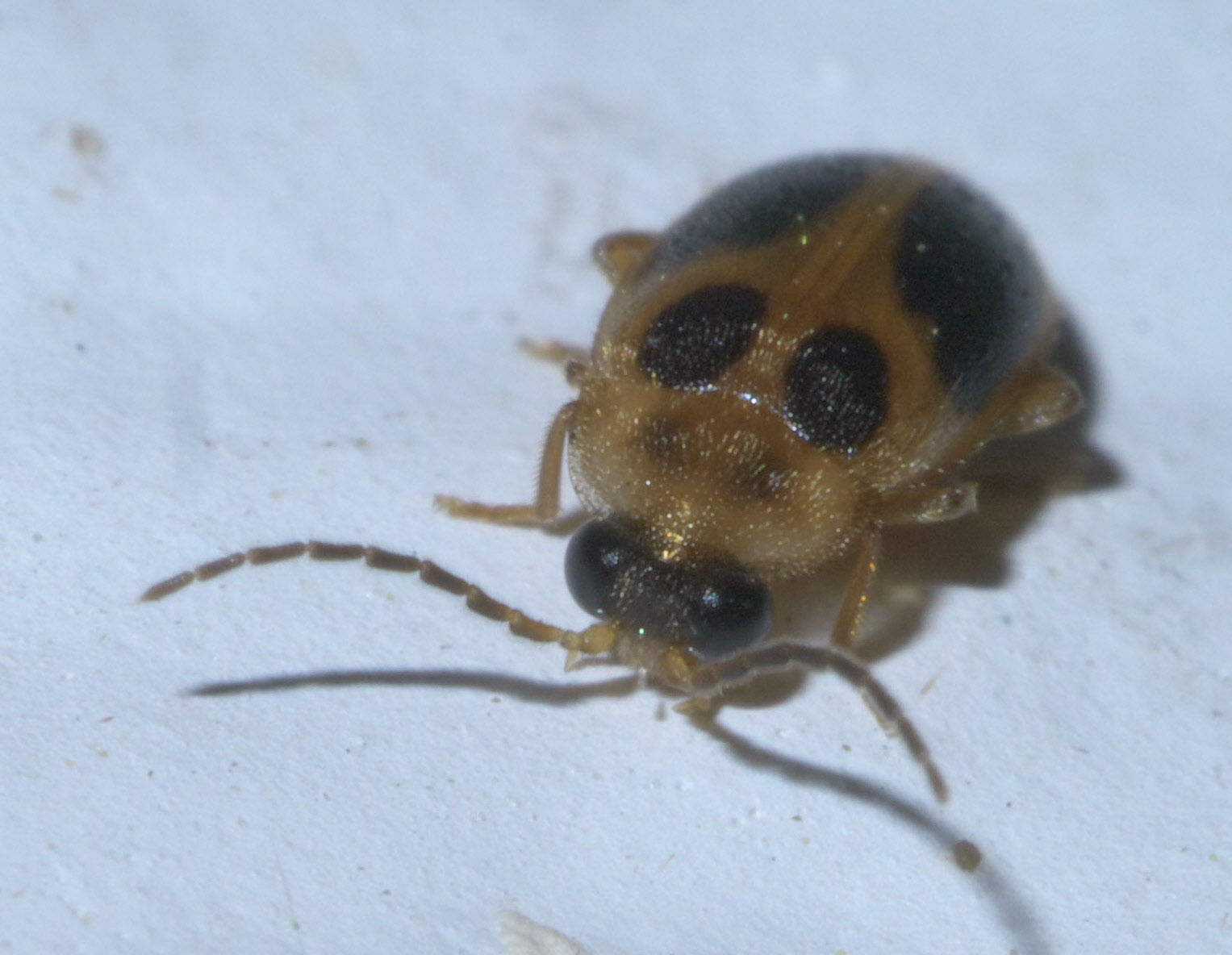
S. pulchella

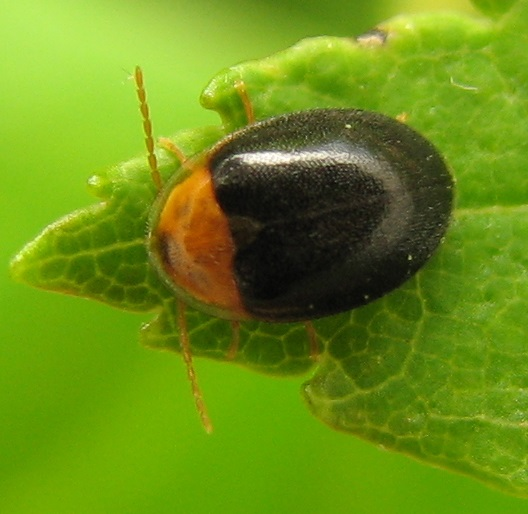
S. thoracica

== Species ==
These seven species belong to the genus Sacodes:

- Sacodes elongata Yoshitomi, 2012^{g}
- Sacodes fuscipennis (Guérin-Méneville, 1843)^{i c g b}
- Sacodes humeralis (Yoshitomi & Sato, 1996)^{g}
- Sacodes leei Yoshitomi & Satô, 2004^{g}
- Sacodes pulchella (Guérin-Méneville, 1843)^{i c g b} (beautiful marsh beetle)
- Sacodes taiwanensis (Yoshitomi & Sato, 1996)^{g}
- Sacodes thoracica (Guérin-Méneville, 1843)^{i c g b}

Data sources: i = ITIS, c = Catalogue of Life, g = GBIF, b = Bugguide.net
