= Sarabandus =

Scientific classification
- Domain: Eukaryota
- Kingdom: Animalia
- Phylum: Arthropoda
- Class: Insecta
- Order: Coleoptera
- Suborder: Polyphaga
- Infraorder: Elateriformia
- Family: Scirtidae
- Genus: Sarabandus; Leech, 1955

Genus of beetles

Sarabandus is a genus of marsh beetles in the family Scirtidae. There are at least two described species in Sarabandus.

== Species ==
These two species belong to the genus Sarabandus:

- Sarabandus monticola Nakane, 1963
- Sarabandus robustus (LeConte, 1875)
