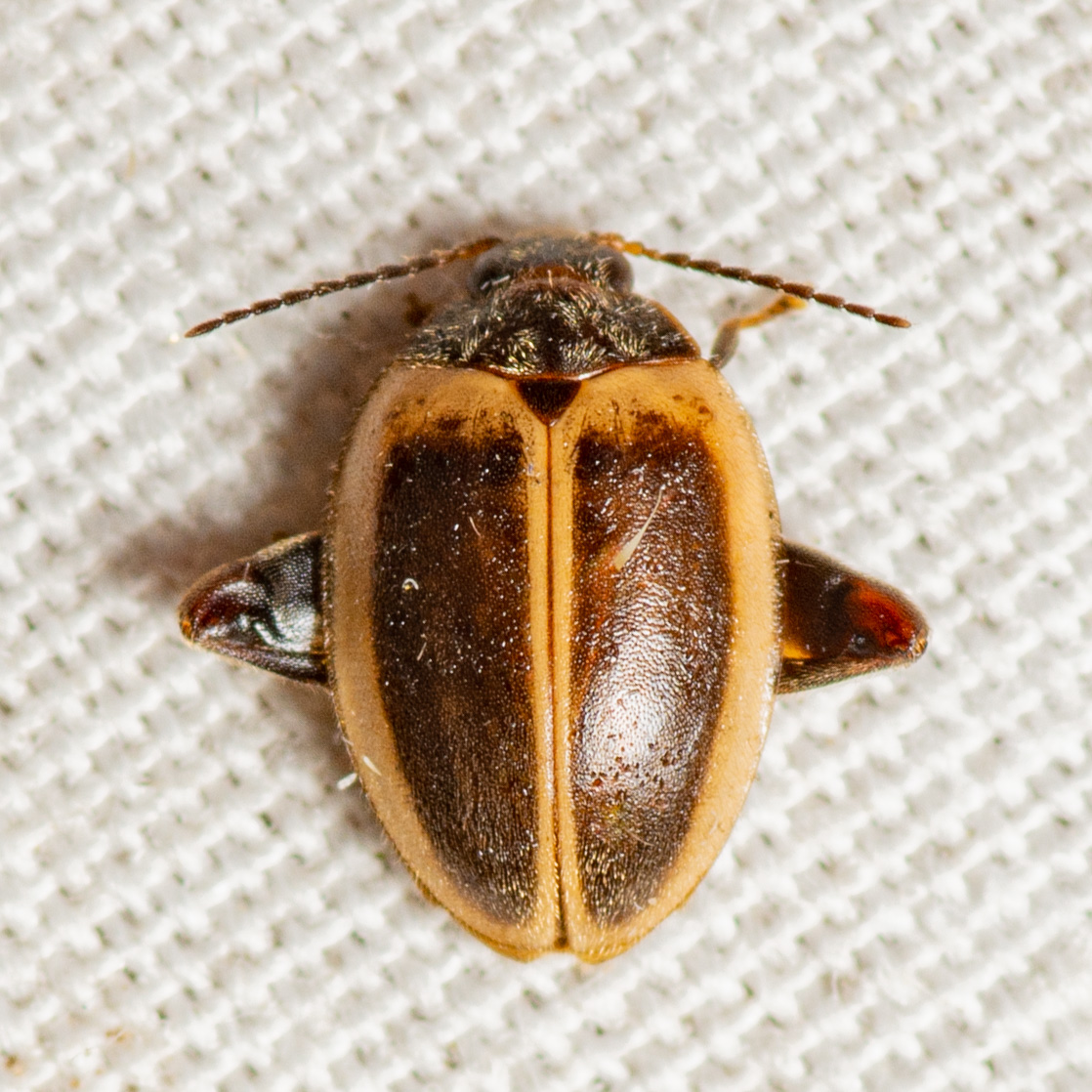
- Ora discoidea

Scientific classification
- Kingdom: Animalia
- Phylum: Arthropoda
- Class: Insecta
- Order: Coleoptera
- Suborder: Polyphaga
- Infraorder: Elateriformia
- Family: Scirtidae
- Genus: Ora; Clark, 1865

= Ora (beetle) =

Genus of beetles

Ora is a genus of flea marsh beetles in the family Scirtidae. There are about 17 described species in Ora.

== Species ==
These 17 species belong to the genus Ora:

- Ora atroapicalis Pic, 1928^{g}
- Ora bivittata Pic, 1922^{g}
- Ora brevieminentia Libonatti, 2014^{g}
- Ora bruchi Pic, 1928^{g}
- Ora depressa Fabricius, 1801^{g}
- Ora discoidea Champion, 1897^{i c g b}
- Ora dufaui Legros, 1947^{g}
- Ora hyacintha Blatchley, 1914^{i c g b}
- Ora improtecta Watts, 2004^{g}
- Ora marmorata Clark, 1865
- Ora mediolineata Pic, 1928^{g}
- Ora megadepressa Libonatti, 2014^{g}
- Ora nigropunctata Motschulsky, 1863^{g}
- Ora okinawanus (Nakane, 1963)
- Ora platensis Brethes, 1925^{g}
- Ora semibrunnea Pic, 1922^{g}
- Ora texana Champion, 1897^{i c g b} (Texas flea marsh beetle)
- Ora troberti (Guérin-Méneville, 1861)^{i c g b}
- Ora wagneri Pic, 1928^{g}
- Ora zacki Epler, 2026

Data sources: i = ITIS, c = Catalogue of Life, g = GBIF, b = Bugguide.net
