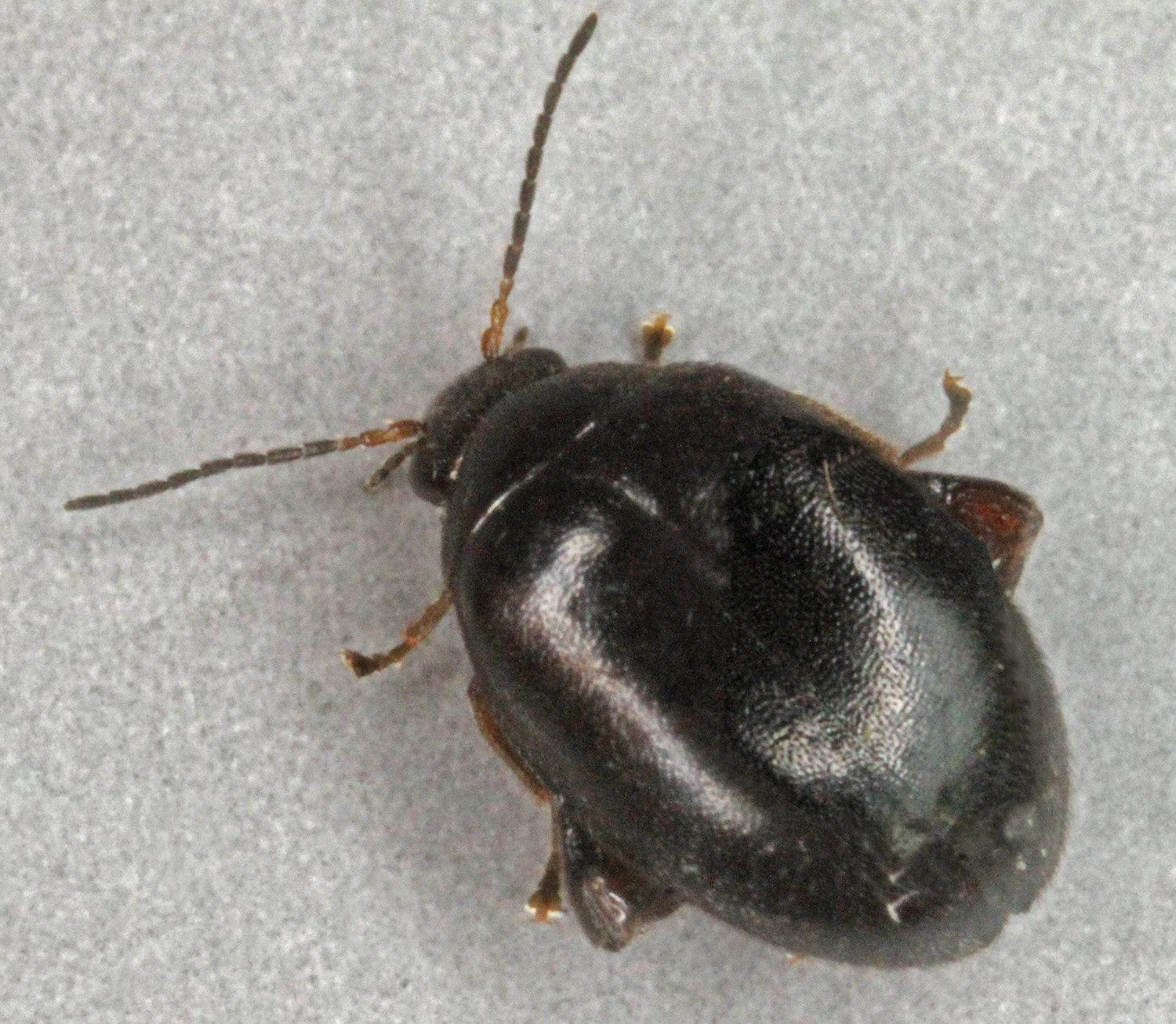
- Scirtes hemisphaericus

Scientific classification
- Kingdom: Animalia
- Phylum: Arthropoda
- Clade: Pancrustacea
- Class: Insecta
- Order: Coleoptera
- Suborder: Polyphaga
- Infraorder: Elateriformia
- Family: Scirtidae
- Genus: Scirtes; Illiger, 1807

= Scirtes =

Genus of beetles

Scirtes is a genus of marsh beetles in the family Scirtidae. There are more than 80 described species in Scirtes.

== Species ==
These 84 species belong to the genus Scirtes:

- Scirtes adustus Boheman, 1858
- Scirtes affinis Motschulsky, 1858
- Scirtes albamaculatus Watts.However, 2004
- Scirtes albotaeniatus Yoshitomi
- Scirtes auratus Watts, 2004
- Scirtes axillaris Motschulsky, 1863
- Scirtes babeldaobensis Yoshitomi
- Scirtes bimaculaticeps Pic, 1918
- Scirtes bo Klausnitzer, 2016
- Scirtes brisbanensis Pic, 1956
- Scirtes caledonicus Bourgeois, 1884
- Scirtes californicus Motschulsky, 1845
- Scirtes canescens Motschulsky, 1863
- Scirtes caraguata Libonatti, 2017
- Scirtes cayennensis Guérin, 1861
- Scirtes championi Picado, 1913
- Scirtes circumcisus Kirejtschuk & Nel, 2013
- Scirtes confinis
- Scirtes constans Pic, 1918
- Scirtes convexiusculus Motschulsky, 1863
- Scirtes dentatus Libonatti, 2017
- Scirtes dicerorhinus Klausnitzer, 2016
- Scirtes diversenotatus Pic, 1930
- Scirtes dufaui Pic, 1916
- Scirtes ebenus Ruta & Yoshitomi, 2010
- Scirtes elegans
- Scirtes elisabethae Pic, 1955
- Scirtes exoletus Waterhouse, 1880
- Scirtes flavohumeralis
- Scirtes gallus Libonatti, 2017
- Scirtes gelimensis Ruta, 2014
- Scirtes goliai Epler, 2012
- Scirtes goodrichi Springer & Waller, 2021
- Scirtes grandis (Motschulsky, 1863)
- Scirtes gressitti Yoshitomi
- Scirtes guillaumati Pic, 1918
- Scirtes haemisphaericus
- Scirtes helicoidalis Libonatti, 2017
- Scirtes helmsi Blackburn, 1892
- Scirtes hemisphaericus (Linnaeus, 1767)
- Scirtes herthae Klausnitzer, 2005
- Scirtes humeralis Horn, 1895
- Scirtes insularis Champion, 1897
- Scirtes japonicus Kiesenwetter, 1874
- Scirtes lemoulti Pic, 1913
- Scirtes lynnae Watts, Cooper & Saint, 2017
- Scirtes mahensis
- Scirtes majerorum Klausnitzer, 2016
- Scirtes maynei Pic, 1955
- Scirtes micronesianus Yoshitomi
- Scirtes nigropunctatus Motschulsky, 1863
- Scirtes nocturnus Pic, 1955
- Scirtes oblongus Guérin-Méneville, 1861
- Scirtes okinawanus Nakane, 1963
- Scirtes orbicularis (Panzer, 1793)
- Scirtes orbiculatus (Fabricius, 1801)
- Scirtes ovalis Blatchley, 1924
- Scirtes ovatulus Lewis, 1895
- Scirtes palauensis Yoshitomi
- Scirtes piceolus Blatchley, 1924
- Scirtes pinjarraensis Watts, 2004
- Scirtes plagiatus Schaeffer, 1906
- Scirtes quadrifossulata Pic, 1916
- Scirtes rufonotatus Pic, 1915
- Scirtes rutai Watts, Cooper & Saint, 2017
- Scirtes sakishimanus Satô & Chûjô, 1972
- Scirtes scheat Klausnitzer, 2003
- Scirtes serratus Watts, Cooper & Saint, 2017
- Scirtes seychellensis Champion, 1924
- Scirtes seydeli Pic, 1955
- Scirtes sobrinus Lewis, 1895
- Scirtes talamauensis Klausnitzer, 2016
- Scirtes testaceicornis Pic, 1913
- Scirtes testaceus Fabricius, 1801
- Scirtes tibialis Guerin-Meneville, 1843
- Scirtes tigmanensis
- Scirtes tinianensis Yoshitomi
- Scirtes townshendi Pic, 1918
- Scirtes tsumaguro Satô & Chûjô, 1972
- Scirtes variegata Guérin, 1843
- Scirtes victoris Pic, 1918
- Scirtes wanati Ruta & Yoshitomi, 2010
- Scirtes zerchei
- Scirtes zwicki Watts, Cooper & Saint, 2017
- Scyrtes japonicus Kiesenwetter, 1874
