= Nyholmia =

Scientific classification
- Domain: Eukaryota
- Kingdom: Animalia
- Phylum: Arthropoda
- Class: Insecta
- Order: Coleoptera
- Suborder: Polyphaga
- Infraorder: Elateriformia
- Family: Scirtidae
- Genus: Nyholmia; Klausnitzer, 2013

Genus of beetles

Nyholmia is a genus of marsh beetles in the family Scirtidae. There are about five described species in Nyholmia.

== Species ==
These five species belong to the genus Nyholmia:

- Nyholmia bicolor (LeConte, 1853)
- Nyholmia collaris (Guérin-Méneville, 1843)
- Nyholmia confusa (Brown, 1930)
- Nyholmia drymophila (Young & Stribling, 1990)
- Nyholmia okiensis Yoshitomi & Hayashi, 2016
