= Contacyphon padi =

Scientific classification
- Kingdom: Animalia
- Phylum: Arthropoda
- Class: Insecta
- Order: Coleoptera
- Suborder: Polyphaga
- Infraorder: Elateriformia
- Family: Scirtidae
- Genus: Contacyphon
- Species: C. padi

Binomial name
- Contacyphon padi (Linnaeus, 1758)

Synonyms
- Cyphon pusillus (LeConte, 1853)

Species of beetle

Contacyphon padi is a species of marsh beetle in the family Scirtidae. It is found in Europe and Northern Asia (excluding China).
