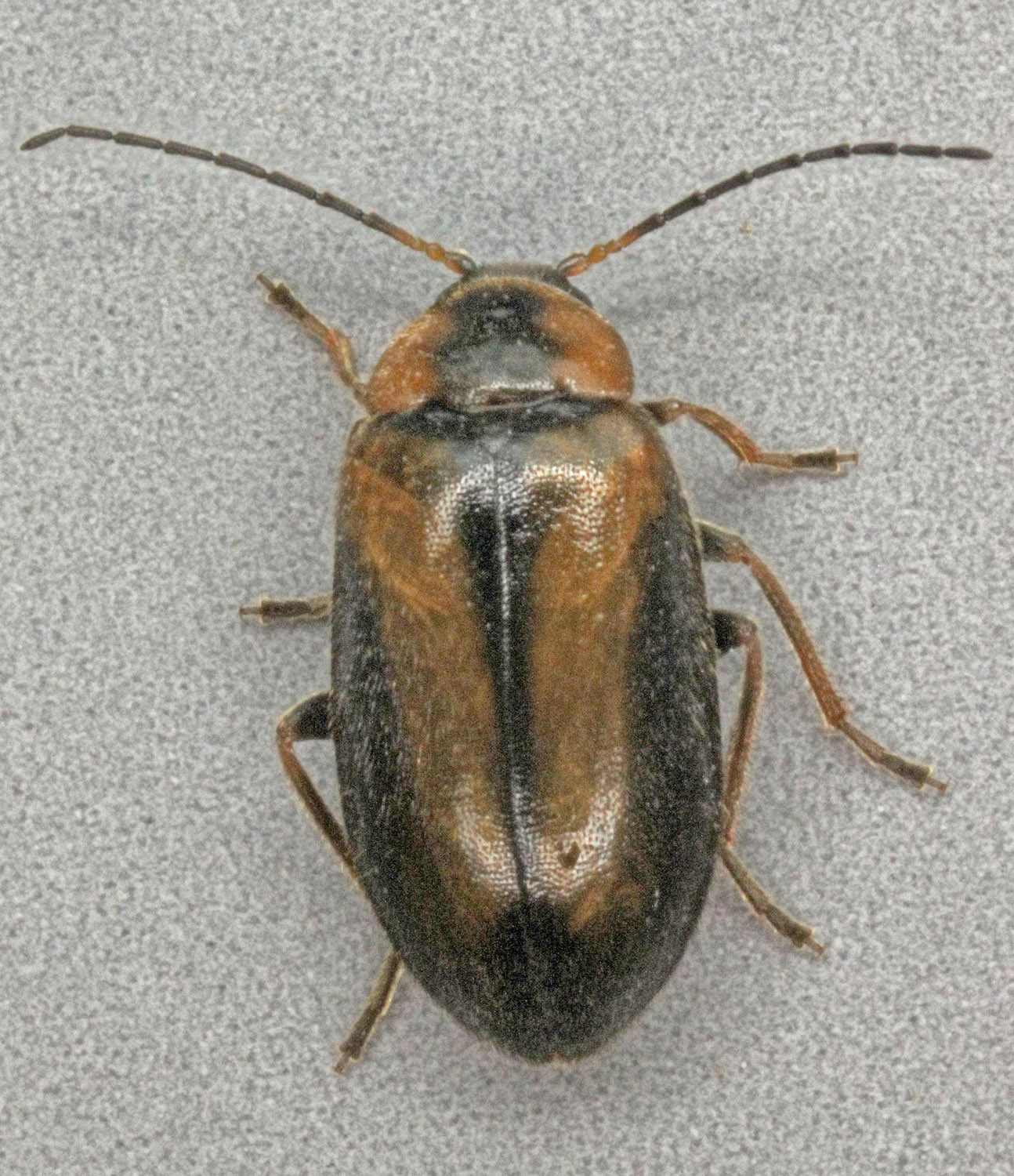
- Elodes marginata

Scientific classification
- Kingdom: Animalia
- Phylum: Arthropoda
- Class: Insecta
- Order: Coleoptera
- Suborder: Polyphaga
- Infraorder: Elateriformia
- Family: Scirtidae
- Genus: Elodes; Latreille, 1796

Synonyms
- Cyphon Paykull, 1799; Helodes Duval, 1861 (Preocc.); Hemicyphon LeConte, 1866

= Elodes =

Genus of beetles

Elodes is a genus of marsh beetles in the family Scirtidae. There are more than 60 described species in Elodes.

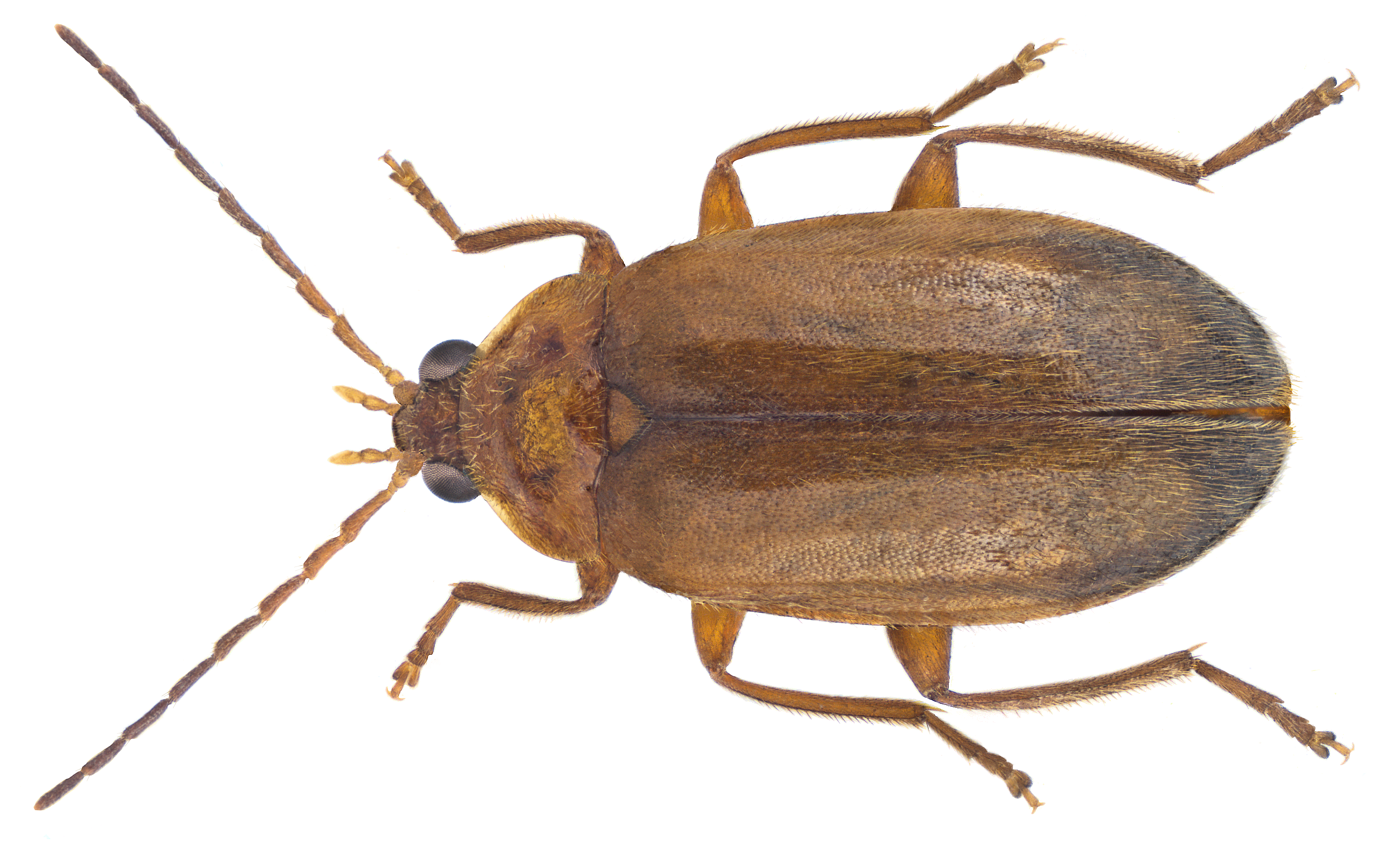
Elodes minuta

== Species ==
- Elodes abeillei Klausnitzer, 1990
- Elodes amamiensis Satô, 1966
- Elodes amicula Klausnitzer, 1980
- Elodes angelini Klausnitzer, 1987
- Elodes angusta Hatch, 1962
- Elodes apicalis (LeConte, 1866)
- Elodes aquatica (Blaisdell, 1940)
- Elodes arcana Klausnitzer, 1972
- Elodes australis Klausnitzer, 1990
- Elodes bertiae Klausnitzer, 1988
- Elodes brasiliensis Guérin-Méneville, 1843
- Elodes bulgharensis Klausnitzer, 1980
- Elodes calabriae Klausnitzer, 1987
- Elodes chrysocomes (Abeille de Perrin, 1872)
- Elodes chrysosomes Abeille, 1872
- Elodes clemenceaui Pic, 1918
- Elodes combusta Guérin-Méneville, 1843
- Elodes corsica Pic, 1898
- Elodes cretica Klausnitzer, 1973
- Elodes denticulata Klausnitzer, 1973
- Elodes elegans Yoshitomi, 1997
- Elodes elongata Tournier, 1869
- Elodes emarginata Hatch, 1962
- Elodes estiennei Pic, 1918
- Elodes fayollei Pic, 1918
- Elodes genei Guérin-Méneville, 1843
- Elodes globulus Klausnitzer, 1990
- Elodes impressa Hatch, 1962
- Elodes johni Klausnitzer, 1975
- Elodes kojimai Nakane, 1963
- Elodes lloydi Pic, 1918
- Elodes longulus Klausnitzer, 1990
- Elodes maculicollis Horn, 1880
- Elodes malickyi Klausnitzer, 1976
- Elodes marginata (Fabricius, 1798)
- Elodes marginicollis Guérin-Méneville, 1843
- Elodes marnei Pic, 1918
- Elodes minuta (Linnaeus, 1767)
- Elodes nebrodensis Ragusa, 1885
- Elodes nimbata (Panzer, 1794)
- Elodes nocturna Klausnitzer, 1979
- Elodes novacretica Klausnitzer, 1990
- Elodes nunenmacheri Wolcott, 1922
- Elodes oblonga Guérin-Méneville, 1843
- Elodes pendens Klausnitzer, 1990
- Elodes peninsularis Pic, 1898
- Elodes petaini Pic, 1918
- Elodes pichoni Pic, 1918
- Elodes pollux Klausnitzer, 2008
- Elodes pseudominuta Klausnitzer, 1971
- Elodes raynali Pic, 1918
- Elodes scutellaris Tournier, 1868
- Elodes secundocretica Klausnitzer, 1976
- Elodes sericea Kiesenwetter, 1859
- Elodes sieberi Klausnitzer, 1973
- Elodes sororum Pic, 1918
- Elodes takahashii Yoshitomi, 2005
- Elodes tournieri Kiesenwetter, 1871
- Elodes tricuspis Nyholm, 1985
- Elodes venetae Klausnitzer, 1987
- Elodes wiisoni Pic, 1918
- † Elodes beigeli Klausnitzer, 2012
- † Elodes mysticopalpalis Klausnitzer, 2012
- † Elodes egregia (Klausnitzer, 1976)
- † Elodes minax (Klausnitzer, 1976)
- † Elodes modesta (Klausnitzer, 1976)
- † Elodes setosa (Klausnitzer, 1976)
- † Elodes transversa (Klausnitzer, 1976)
