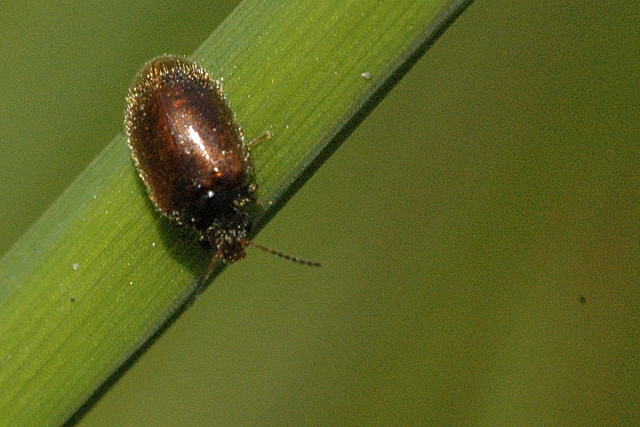
- Contacyphon padi

Scientific classification
- Kingdom: Animalia
- Phylum: Arthropoda
- Clade: Pancrustacea
- Class: Insecta
- Order: Coleoptera
- Suborder: Polyphaga
- Infraorder: Elateriformia
- Superfamily: Scirtoidea
- Family: Scirtidae; Fleming, 1821

Subfamilies
- Nipponocyphoninae; Scirtinae; Stenocyphoninae

Synonyms
- Elodiidae Shuckard, 1839

= Scirtidae =

Scirtidae Temporal range: Cenomanian–Recent

Family of beetles

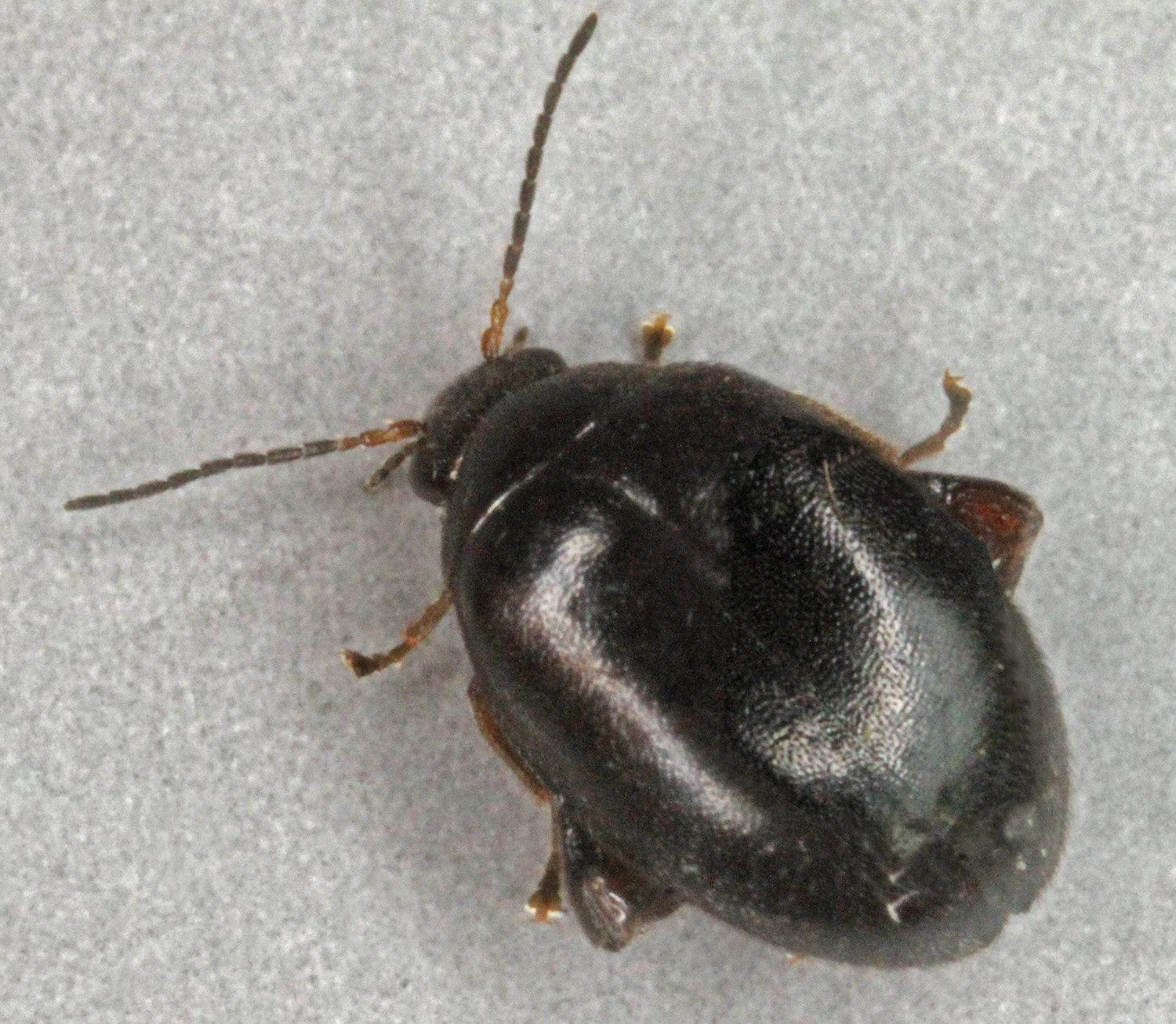
Scirtes hemisphaericus, North Wales

Scirtidae is a family of beetles (Coleoptera). These beetles are commonly referred to as marsh beetles, as the larvae are typically associated with stagnant water, but can be found in flowing water. Adults prefer decomposing plant material near the water's edge. More than an estimated 600 species are known worldwide, distributed among at least 60 genera.

== Genera ==
These 82 genera belong to the family Scirtidae:

- Accolabass Watts, 2009
- Alpestriscyphon Watts, Cooper & Libonatti, 2020
- Amplectopus Sharp, 1886
- Anocyphon Watts, Cooper & Libonatti, 2020
- Anthocara Watts, Cooper & Libonatti, 2020
- Anticyphon Ruta, 2016
- Atopida White, 1846
- Austrocyphon Zwick, 2013
- Brachelodes Yablokov-Khnzorian, 1961
- Brachycyphon Fairmaire, 1896
- Byrrhopsis Champion, 1913
- Calvariopsis Ruta, 2019
- Calvarium Pic, 1918
- Chameloscyphon Watts, 2011
- Chilarboreus Ruta, 2011
- Contacyphon Des Gozis, 1886
- Copiacyphon Watts, Cooper & Libonatti, 2020
- Cygnocyphon Zwick, 2015
- Cyphanodes Broun, 1893
- Cyphanus Sharp, 1878
- Cyphonogenius Yablokov-Khnzorian, 1961
- Cyphotelus Sharp, 1878
- Cyprobius Sharp, 1878
- Daploeuros Watts, 2011
- Dasyscyphon Watts, 2011
- Elodes Latreille, 1796
- Eurycyphon Watts, 2011
- Exochomoscirtes Pic, 1916
- Furcacyphon Watts, Cooper & Libonatti, 2020
- Hemicyphon LeConte, 1866
- Herthania Klausnitzer, 2006
- Heterocyphon Armstrong, 1953
- Hiekecyphon Klausnitzer, 2016
- Hydrocyphon Redtenbacher, 1858
- Indiocyphon Pic, 1918
- Latuscara Watts, Cooper & Libonatti, 2020
- Leptocyphon Zwick, 2015
- Macrocyphon Pic, 1918
- Macrodascillus Carter, 1935
- Meatopida Kialka & Ruta, 2018
- Memorocyphon Pic, 1918
- Mescirtes Motschulsky, 1863
- Mesocyphon Sharp, 1878
- Microcara Thomson, 1859
- Miocyphon Wickham, 1914
- Nanocyphon Zwick, 2013
- Nasutuscyphon Watts, Cooper & Libonatti, 2020
- Nektriscyphon Watts, Cooper & Libonatti, 2020
- Neocyphon Ruta, Libonatti, Epler, & Klausnitzer, 2026
- Nipponocyphon Lawrence & Yoshitomi, 2007
- Nothocyphon Zwick, 2015
- Nyholmia Klausnitzer, 2013
- Odeles Klausnitzer, 2004
- Ora Clark, 1865 (flea marsh beetles)
- Papuacyphon Zwick, 2014
- Paracyphon Zwick, 2015
- Peneveronatus Armstrong, 1953
- Perplexacara Watts, Bradford & Cooper, 2021
- Petrocyphon Watts, 2011
- Pictacara Watts, Cooper & Libonatti, 2020
- Plagiocyphon Yablokov-Khnzorian, 1961
- Prionocyphon Redtenbacher, 1858
- Prionoscirtes Champion, 1897
- Pseudomicrocara Armstrong, 1953
- Pumiliocara Watts, Cooper & Libonatti, 2020
- Ruborcara Watts, Cooper & Libonatti, 2020
- Sacodes LeConte, 1853
- Saltuscyphon Watts, Cooper & Libonatti, 2020
- Saprocyphon Watts, Cooper & Libonatti, 2020
- Sarabandus Leech, 1955
- Scirtes Illiger, 1807
- Sisyracyphon Watts, Cooper & Libonatti, 2020
- Spaniosdascillus Watts, 2011
- Spilotocyphon Watts, Cooper & Libonatti, 2020
- Spumacinctus Jorge, Libonatti, Benetti, & Hamada, 2026
- Stenocyphon Lawrence, 2001
- Tasmanocyphon Zwick, 2013
- Tectocyphon Zwick, 2015
- Tenebriocyphon Watts, Cooper & Libonatti, 2020
- Vadumcyphon Watts, Cooper & Libonatti, 2020
- Veronatus Sharp, 1878
- Yoshitomia Klausnitzer, 2013
- Ypsiloncyphon Klausnitzer, 2009

=== Fossil genera ===
- †Mesernobius Engel 2010 Burmese amber, Myanmar, Cenomanian
- †Miocyphon Wickham 1914 Florissant Formation, Colorado, Eocene
