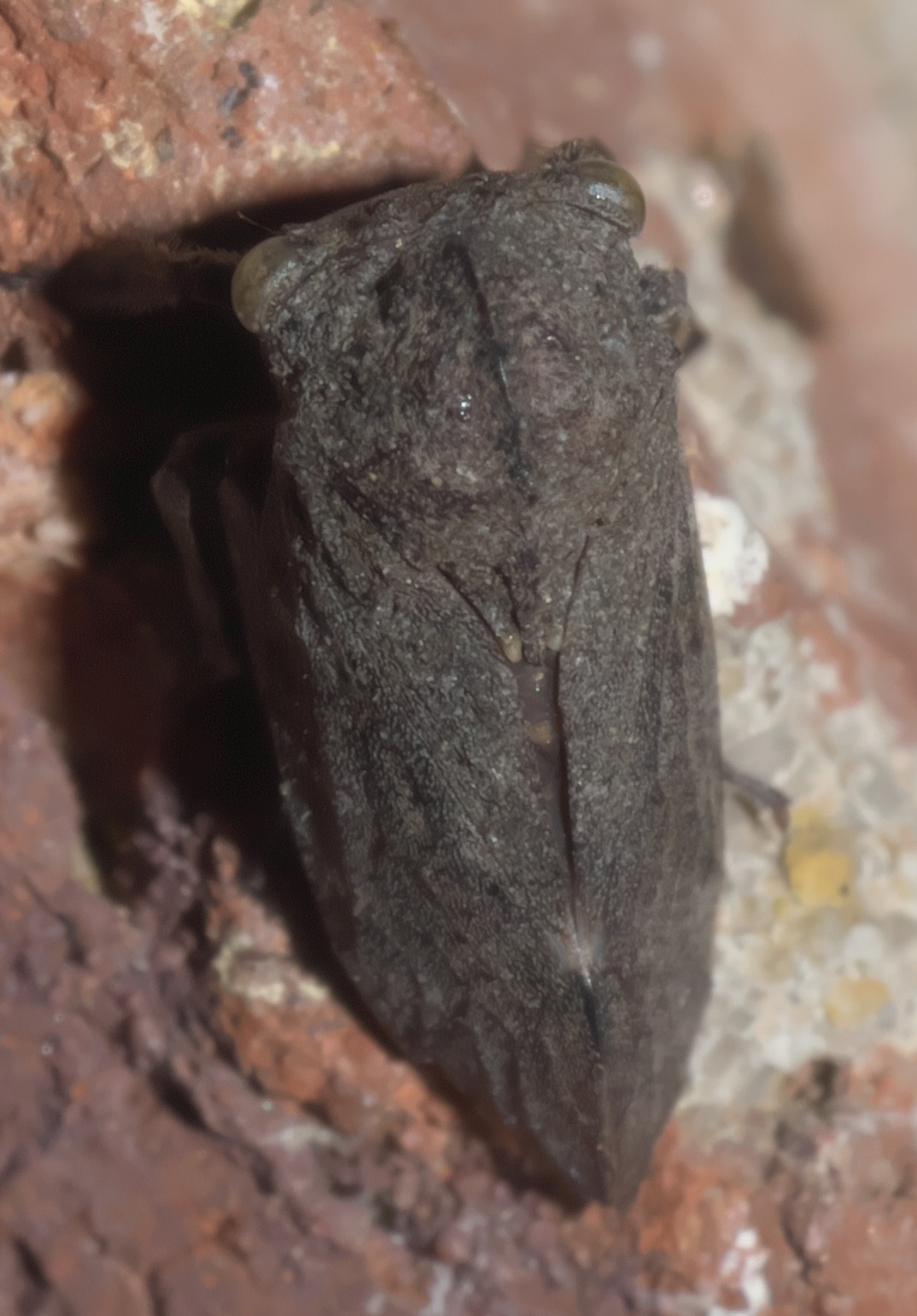
- Microcentrus caryae

Scientific classification
- Domain: Eukaryota
- Kingdom: Animalia
- Phylum: Arthropoda
- Class: Insecta
- Order: Hemiptera
- Suborder: Auchenorrhyncha
- Family: Membracidae
- Subfamily: Stegaspidinae; Haupt, 1929

= Stegaspidinae =

Subfamily of treehoppers

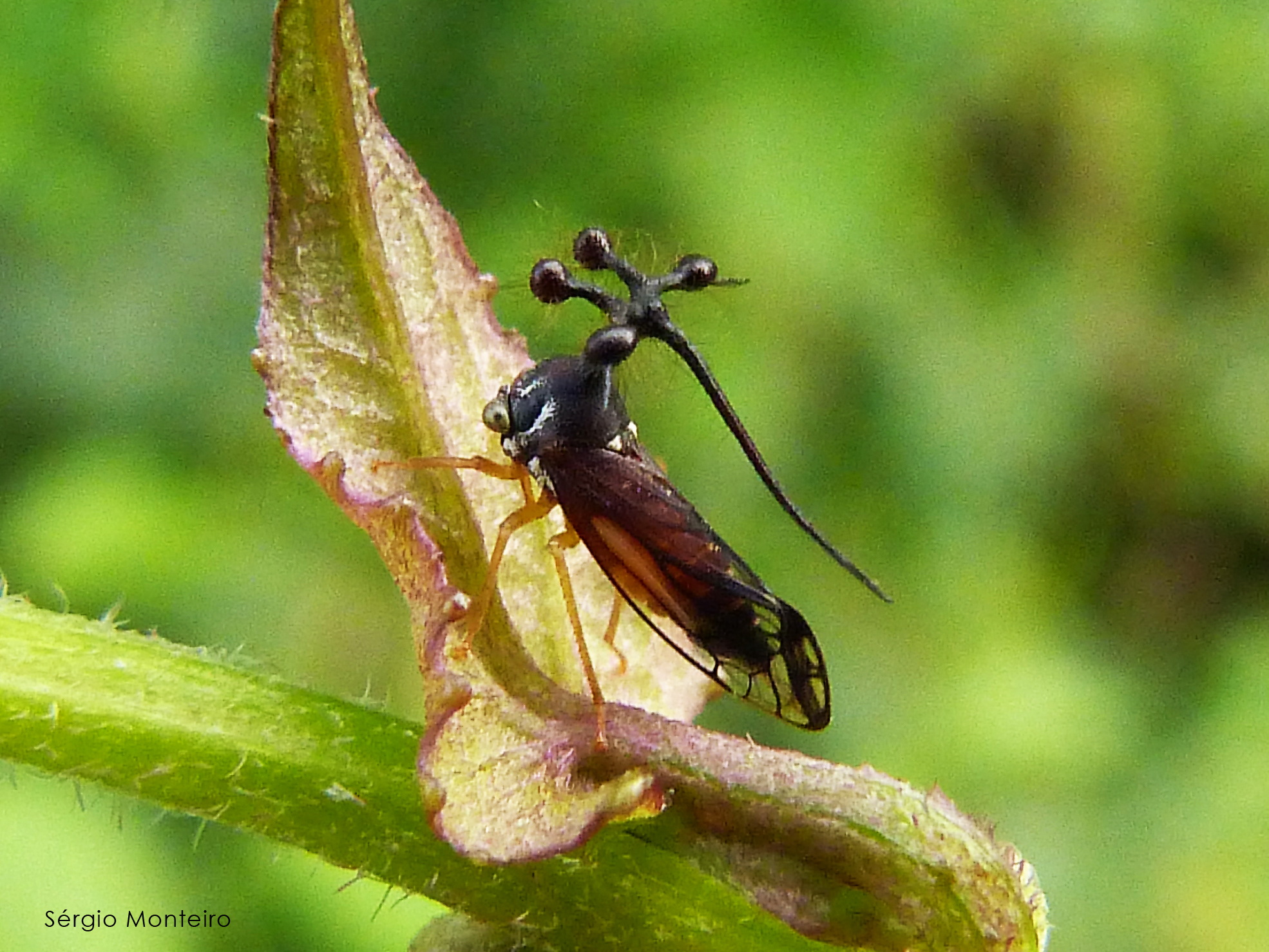
Bocydium globulare

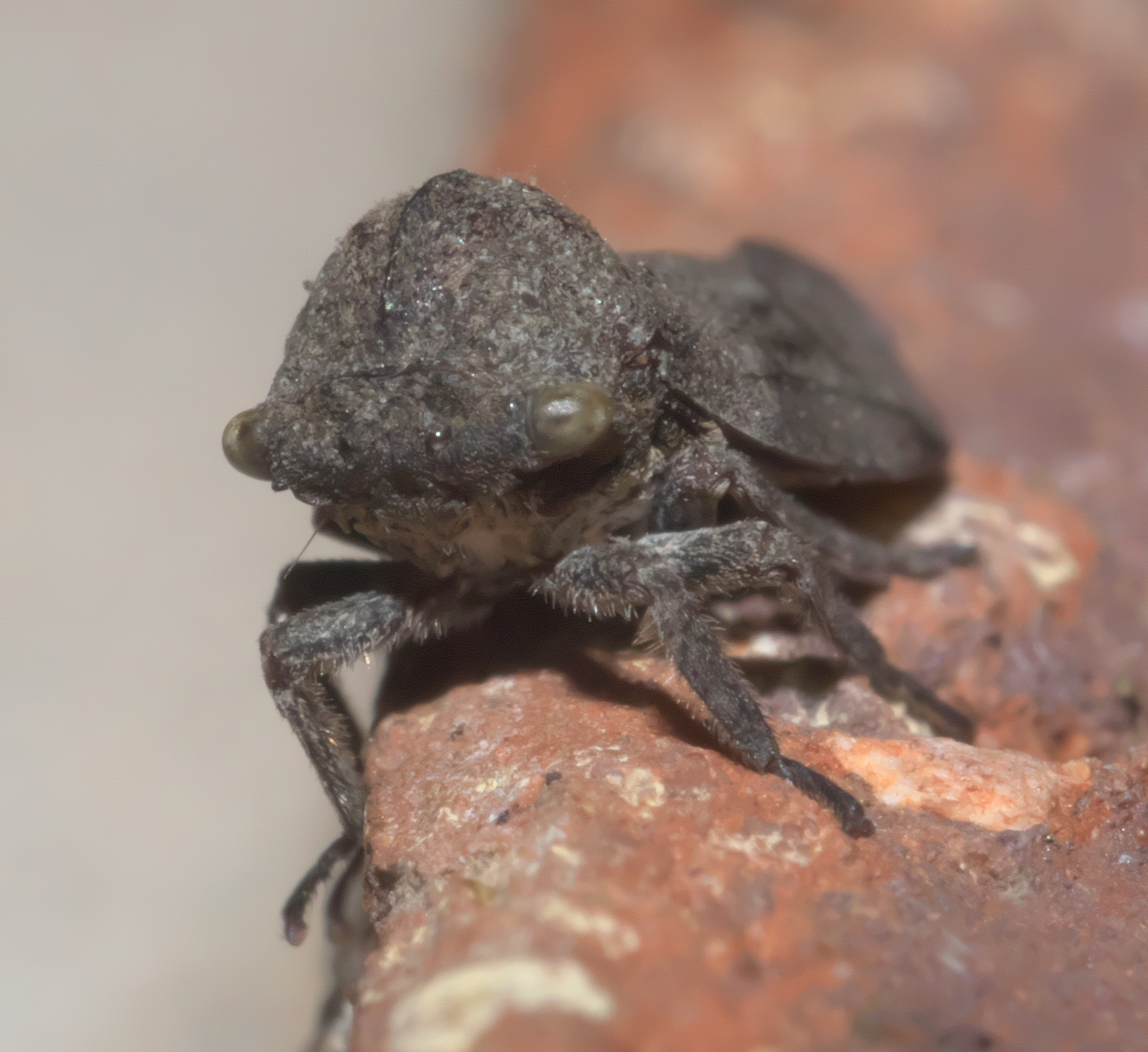
Microcentrus caryae

Stegaspidinae is a subfamily of treehoppers in the family Membracidae.

== Genera ==
These genera are members of the subfamily Stegaspidinae:

- Antillotolania Ramos, 1957^{c g}
- Bocydium Latreille, 1829^{c g}
- Centruchoides Fowler, 1896^{c g}
- Deiroderes Ramos, 1957^{c g}
- Flexocentrus Goding, 1926^{c g}
- Glischrocentrus Fowler, 1896^{c g}
- Lirania Stål, 1860^{c g}
- Lycoderes Germar, 1835^{c g}
- Microcentrus Stal, 1869^{c g b}
- Oeda Amyot & Audinet-Serville, 1843^{c g}
- Smerdalea Fowler, 1896^{c g}
- Stegaspis Germar, 1833^{c g}
- Stylocentrus Stål, 1869^{c g}
- Tumecauda Goding, 1930^{c g}
- Umbelligerus Deitz, 1975^{c g}

Data sources: i = ITIS, c = Catalogue of Life, g = GBIF, b = Bugguide.net
