= Antillotolania =

Scientific classification
- Domain: Eukaryota
- Kingdom: Animalia
- Phylum: Arthropoda
- Class: Insecta
- Order: Hemiptera
- Suborder: Auchenorrhyncha
- Family: Membracidae
- Subfamily: Stegaspidinae
- Genus: Antillotolania; Ramos, 1957

Species
- Antillotolania doramariae; Antillotolania microcentroides; Antillotolania myricae

Diversity
- 3 species

Genus of true bugs

Antillotolania is a genus of treehoppers in the family Membracidae. It is found in the Caribbean islands.
