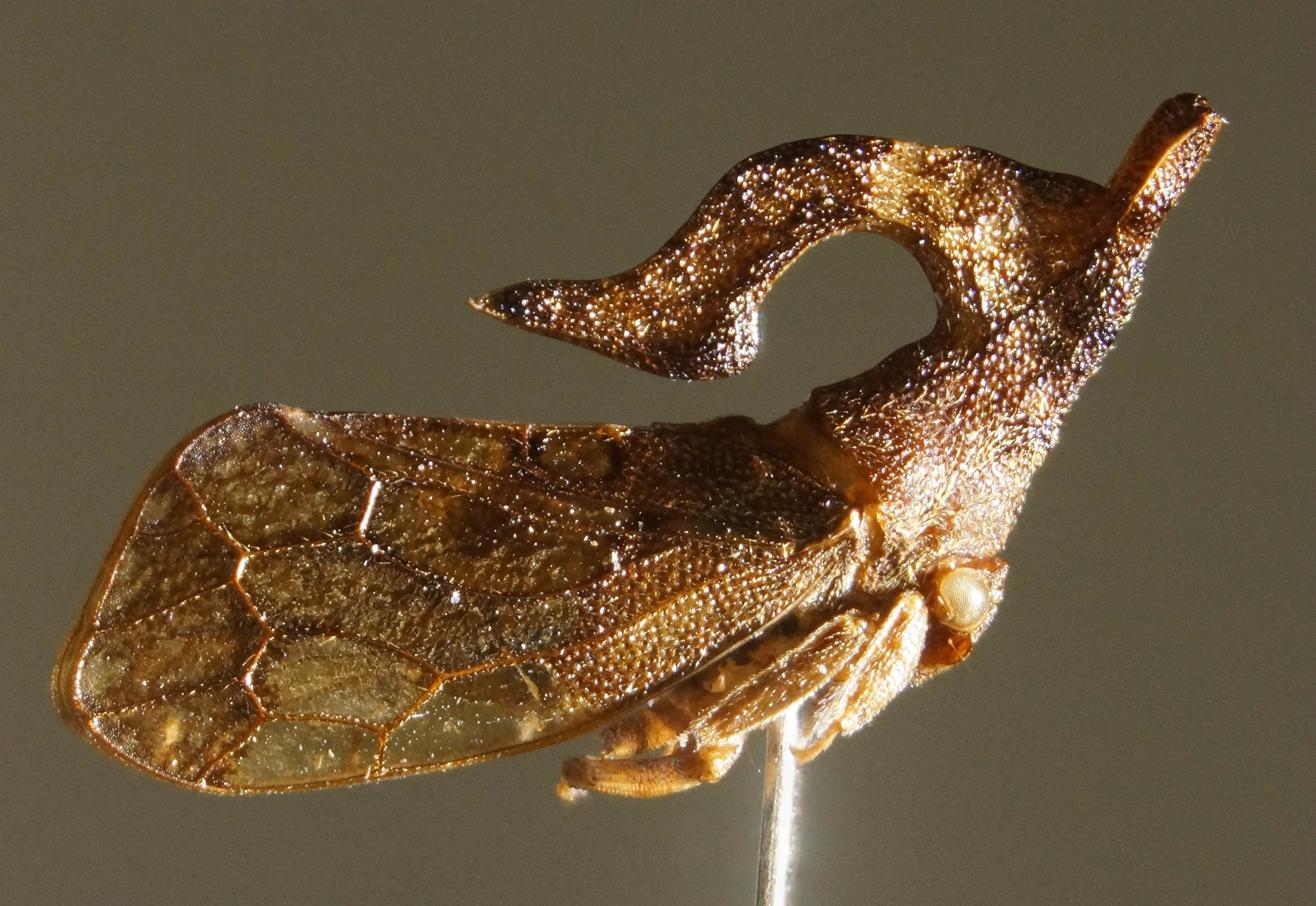
- Lycoderes gaffa

Scientific classification
- Domain: Eukaryota
- Kingdom: Animalia
- Phylum: Arthropoda
- Class: Insecta
- Order: Hemiptera
- Suborder: Auchenorrhyncha
- Family: Membracidae
- Subfamily: Stegaspidinae
- Genus: Lycoderes; Germar, 1835

= Lycoderes =

Genus of insects

Lycoderes is a genus of treehoppers belonging to the subfamily Stegaspidinae. It was first described by the German entomologist Ernst Friedrich Germar in 1835, and contains 18 species.

== Distribution ==
Lycoderes is found across Central and South America, stretching from Mexico in the northwest to Brazil in the southeast.

== Species ==
Lycoderes contains the following species:

- Lycoderes albinoi Creão-Duarte & Cabral, 2017
- Lycoderes alvarengai Sakakibara, 1972
- Lycoderes ancora (Germar, 1821)
- Lycoderes apertus (Walker, 1858)
- Lycoderes argutus Sakakibara, 1992
- Lycoderes clavatus Sakakibara, 1972
- Lycoderes fabricii Metcalf & Wade, 1965
- Lycoderes foliatus Sakakibara, 1972
- Lycoderes furcifer Sakakibara, 1970
- Lycoderes gaffa Fairmaire, 1846
- Lycoderes gladiator Germar, 1835
- Lycoderes luctans Stål, 1862
- Lycoderes mitratus Germar, 1835
- Lycoderes petasus Fairmaire, 1846
- Lycoderes reichardti Sakakibara, 1972
- Lycoderes turritus Sakakibara, 1970
- Lycoderes unicolor Fairmaire, 1846
- Lycoderes wygodzinskyi Sakakibara, 1972
