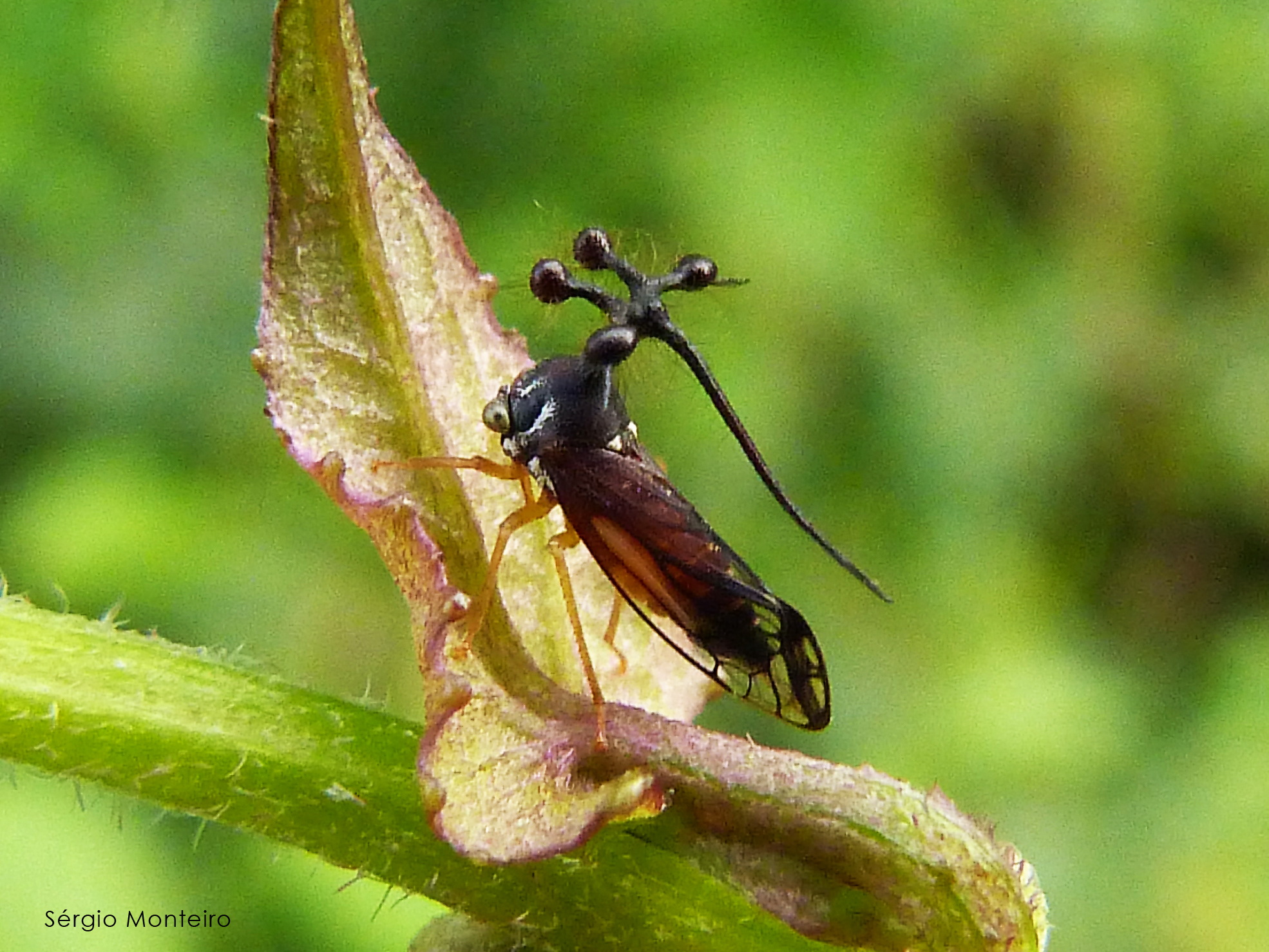
- Bocydium globulare

Scientific classification
- Kingdom: Animalia
- Phylum: Arthropoda
- Class: Insecta
- Order: Hemiptera
- Suborder: Auchenorrhyncha
- Family: Membracidae
- Subfamily: Stegaspidinae
- Genus: Bocydium; Latreille, 1829

= Bocydium =

Genus of true bugs

Bocydium is a genus of insects in the treehopper family, Membracidae. A 1999 classification identified 14 species in the genus, distributed around the Neotropics.

== Species ==
Species include:

- Bocydium amischoglobum Sakakibara, 1981
- Bocydium anisobullatum Sakakibara, 1981
- Bocydium astilatum Richter, 1955
- Bocydium bilobum Flórez-V, 2017
- Bocydium bulliferum Goding, 1930
- Bocydium duoglobum Cryan, 1999
- Bocydium germarii Guérin-Méneville, 1844
- Bocydium globulare Fabricius, 1803
- Bocydium globuliferum Pallas, 1766
- Bocydium hadronotum Flórez-V, 2017
- Bocydium mae Flórez-V, 2017
- Bocydium nigrofasciatum Richter, 1955
- Bocydium racemiferum Sakakibara, 1981
- Bocydium rufiglobum Fairmaire, 1846
- Bocydium sakakibarai Flórez-V, 2017
- Bocydium sanmiguelense Flórez-V, 2017
- Bocydium sexvesicatum Sakakibara, 1981
- Bocydium sphaerulatum Sakakibara, 1981
- Bocydium tatamaense Flórez-V, 2017
- Bocydium tintinnabuliferum Lesson, 1832
