= Tumecauda =

Scientific classification
- Domain: Eukaryota
- Kingdom: Animalia
- Phylum: Arthropoda
- Class: Insecta
- Order: Hemiptera
- Suborder: Auchenorrhyncha
- Family: Membracidae
- Subfamily: Stegaspidinae
- Genus: Tumecauda; Goding, 1930

Genus of insects

Tumecauda is a genus of treehoppers belonging to the subfamily Stegaspidinae. It contains 4 species.

== Species ==
- Tumecauda magnifica (Strümpel, 1988)
- Tumecauda pygmaea Cryan, Robertson & Deitz, 2004
- Tumecauda schaefferi Goding, 1930
- Tumecauda serraticornis (Funkhouser, 1930)
