= Centruchoides =

Scientific classification
- Domain: Eukaryota
- Kingdom: Animalia
- Phylum: Arthropoda
- Class: Insecta
- Order: Hemiptera
- Suborder: Auchenorrhyncha
- Family: Membracidae
- Subfamily: Stegaspidinae
- Genus: Centruchoides; Fowler, 1896

Type species
- Centruchoides laticornis Fowler, 1896

Genus of insects

Centruchoides is a genus of treehoppers belonging to the subfamily Stegaspidinae. It contains two species.

- Centruchoides laticornis Fowler, 1896
- Centruchoides oppugnans (Walker, 1858)
