= Lirania =

Scientific classification
- Kingdom: Animalia
- Phylum: Arthropoda
- Clade: Pancrustacea
- Class: Insecta
- Order: Hemiptera
- Suborder: Auchenorrhyncha
- Family: Membracidae
- Genus: Lirania; Stål, 1862
- Species: L. bituberculata

Binomial name
- Lirania bituberculata Stål, 1862

Genus of insects

Lirania is a genus of treehoppers in the subfamily Stegaspidinae. It contains a single species, Lirania bituberculata.
