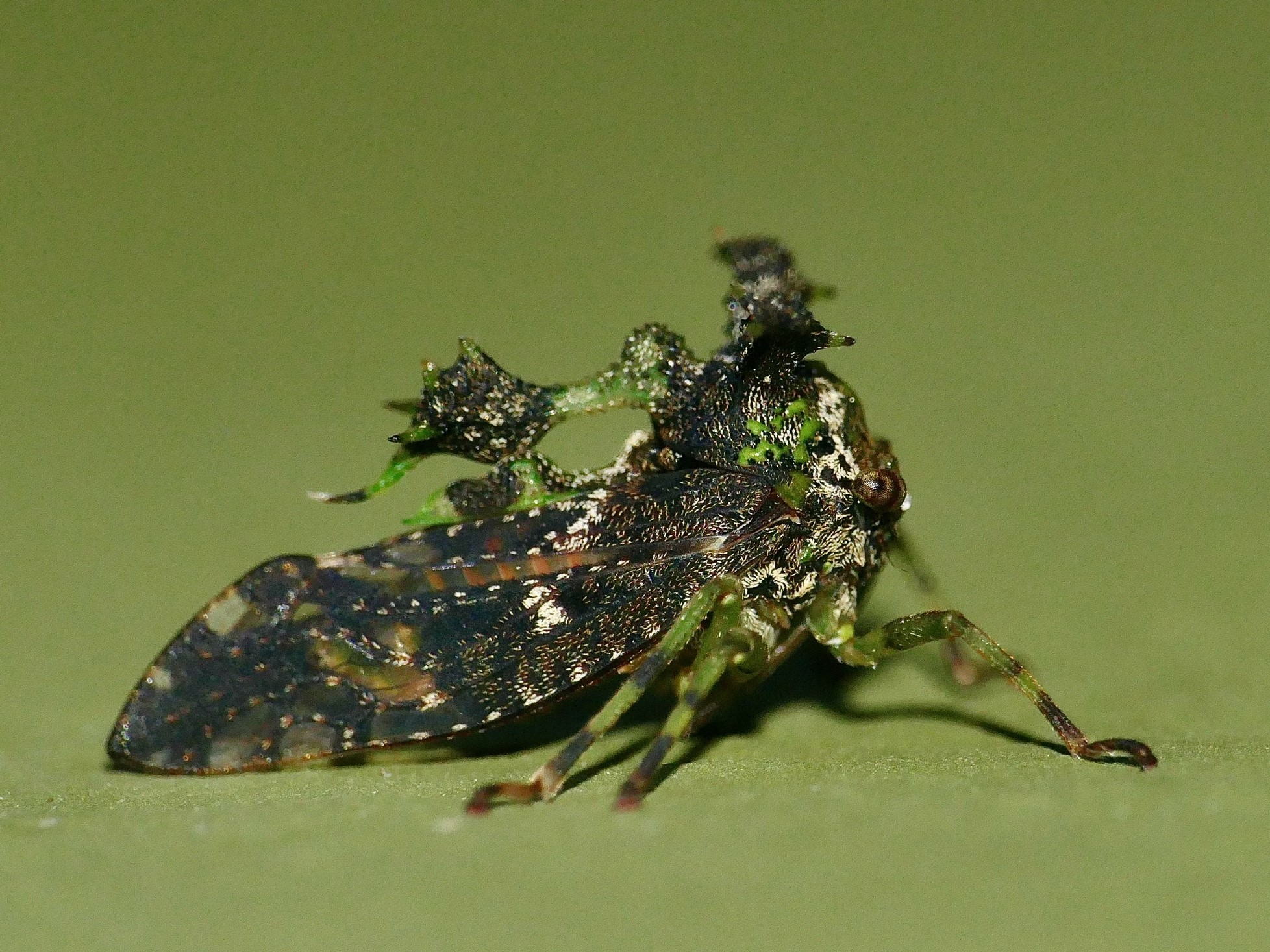
- Smerdalea horrescens

Scientific classification
- Domain: Eukaryota
- Kingdom: Animalia
- Phylum: Arthropoda
- Class: Insecta
- Order: Hemiptera
- Suborder: Auchenorrhyncha
- Family: Membracidae
- Subfamily: Stegaspidinae
- Genus: Smerdalea; Fowler, 1896

= Smerdalea =

Genus of insects

Smerdalea is a genus of treehoppers belonging to the subfamily Stegaspidinae. It was erected by William Weekes Fowler in 1896, and contains five species.

== Distribution ==
Smerdalea is found across Central and South America, stretching from Mexico in the north, Peru in the south, and French Guiana in the east.

== Species ==
Smerdalea contains the following species:

- Smerdalea circumflexa Cryan, 1995
- Smerdalea elevata Cryan, 1995
- Smerdalea horrescens Fowler, 1896
- Smerdalea imminens Cryan, 1999
