= Umbelligerus =

Scientific classification
- Domain: Eukaryota
- Kingdom: Animalia
- Phylum: Arthropoda
- Class: Insecta
- Order: Hemiptera
- Suborder: Auchenorrhyncha
- Family: Membracidae
- Subfamily: Stegaspidinae
- Genus: Umbelligerus; Deitz, 1975

Genus of insects

Umbelligerus is a genus of treehoppers belonging to the subfamily Stegaspidinae. It contains 5 species.

== Species ==
- Umbelligerus convergens Flynn, 2014
- Umbelligerus furcillatus Sakakibara, 1981
- Umbelligerus peruviensis Deitz, 1975
- Umbelligerus stockwelli Flynn, 2014
- Umbelligerus woldai Sakakibara, 1981
