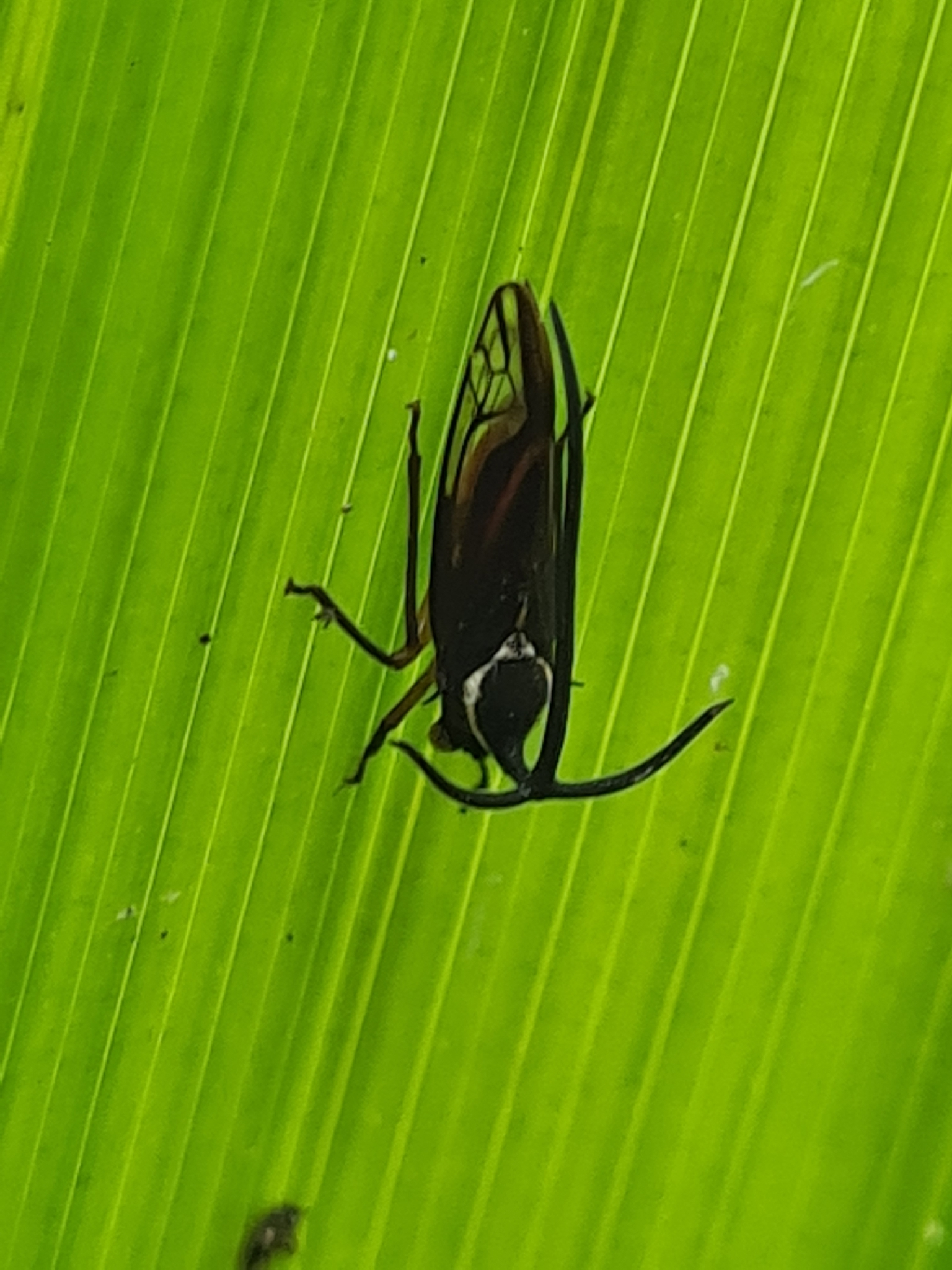
- Stylocentrus ancora

Scientific classification
- Kingdom: Animalia
- Phylum: Arthropoda
- Clade: Pancrustacea
- Class: Insecta
- Order: Hemiptera
- Suborder: Auchenorrhyncha
- Family: Membracidae
- Subfamily: Stegaspidinae
- Genus: Stylocentrus; Stål, 1869

= Stylocentrus =

Genus of insects

Stylocentrus is a genus of treehoppers belonging to the subfamily Stegaspidinae. It contains 3 species.

== Species ==
- Stylocentrus ancora (Perty, 1833)
- Stylocentrus championi Fowler, 1896
- Stylocentrus rubrinigris Funkhouser, 1940
- Stylocentrus pouilloni Boderau & Nel, sp. nov.
