= Oeda =

Scientific classification
- Domain: Eukaryota
- Kingdom: Animalia
- Phylum: Arthropoda
- Class: Insecta
- Order: Hemiptera
- Suborder: Auchenorrhyncha
- Family: Membracidae
- Subfamily: Stegaspidinae
- Genus: Oeda; Amyot and Serville, 1843

Genus of insects

Oeda is a genus of treehoppers belonging to the subfamily Stegaspidinae in the family Membracidae. It contains 5 species in two subgenera, Oeda (Oeda) and Oeda (Oedacanthus).

== Subgenera and species ==
- Oeda (Oeda) Amyot & Audinet-Serville, 1843
  - Oeda (Oeda) hamulata Stål, 1869
  - Oeda (Oeda) inflata (Fabricius, 1787)
  - Oeda (Oeda) mielkei Sakakibara, 2014
  - Oeda (Oeda) mirandai Fonseca, 1951
- Oeda (Oedacanthus) Fonseca, 1951
  - Oeda (Oedacanthus) informis (Westwood, 1842)
