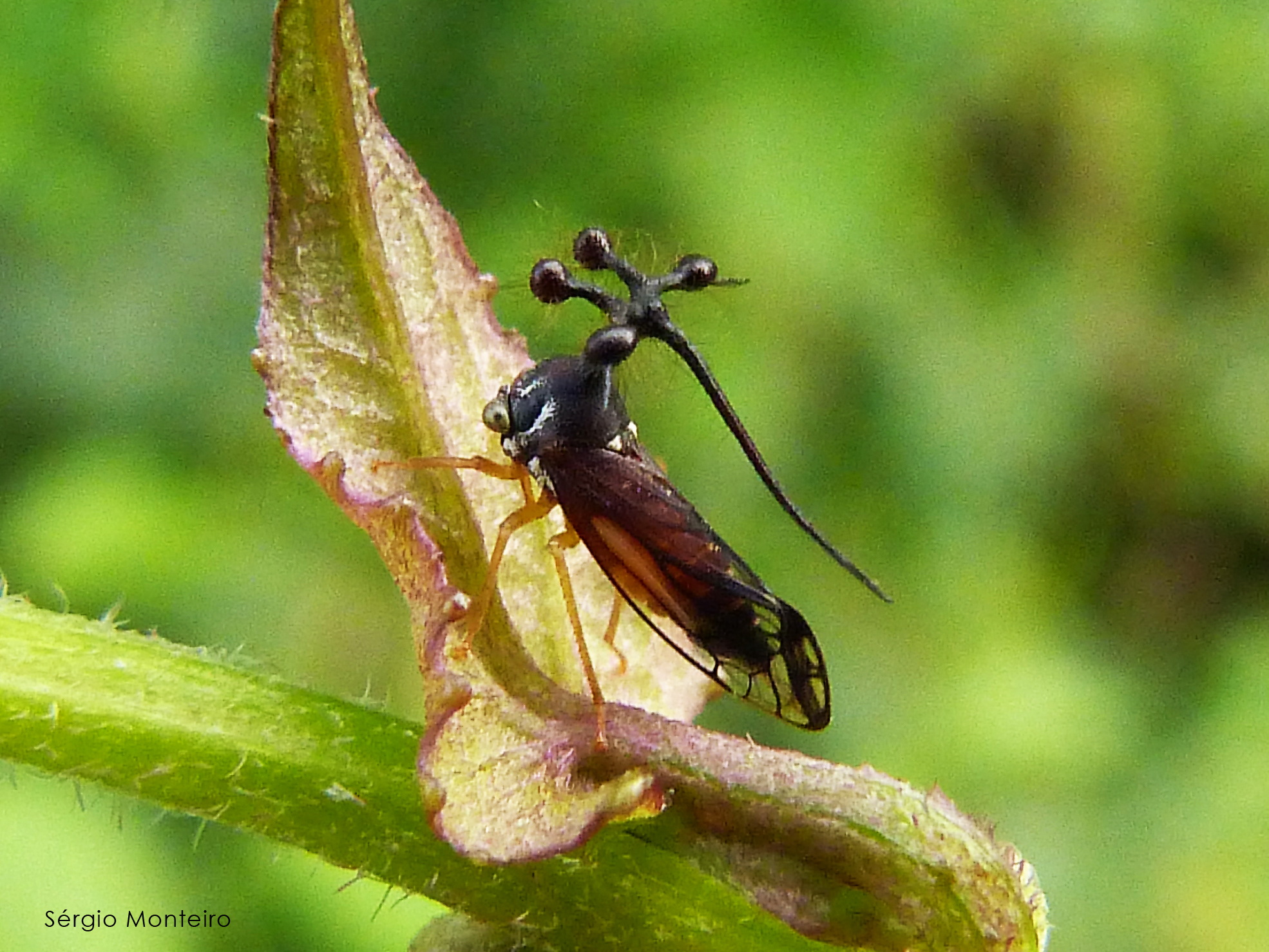

Scientific classification
- Kingdom: Animalia
- Phylum: Arthropoda
- Clade: Pancrustacea
- Class: Insecta
- Order: Hemiptera
- Suborder: Auchenorrhyncha
- Family: Membracidae
- Genus: Bocydium
- Species: B. globulare

Binomial name
- Bocydium globulare (Fabricius, 1803)

= Bocydium globulare =

Species of true bug

The Brazilian treehopper (Bocydium globulare) is a species of insect belonging to the treehopper family (Membracidae). It has unusual appendages on its thorax. While Bocydium can be found throughout the world, they are most prevalent in Africa, North and South America, Asia and Australia. They exhibit limited movement and their primary food source is from the underside of leaves. They also exhibit hemimetabolous development. Treehoppers range from about two millimeters to two centimeters in length.

== Diet ==
The nymphs feed on the underside of leaves. They are deemed "sap sucking" insects because the nymph gets its nutrition from the sap of the leaves.

== Life cycle ==
Plants are essential for the Brazilian treehopper's life cycle. There are numerous ways that these females can lay their eggs. One common method used is to lay the egg directly inside the tissue of the plant. Some females also will lay the egg on the plant's surface. This species in particular has hemimetabolous development, where they begin as an egg, growing into a nymph, reaching the adult maturation.

== Appendages ==
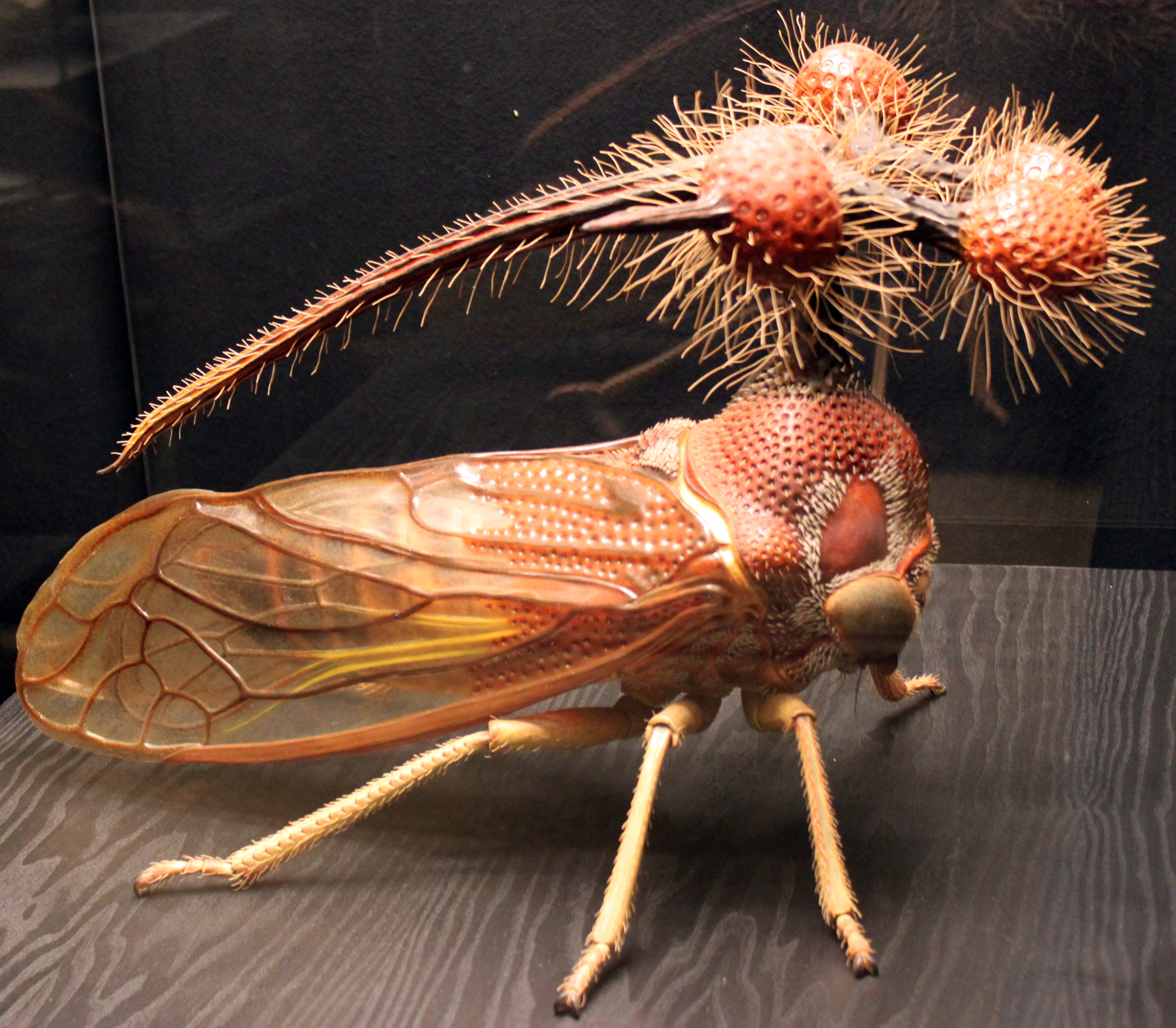
A model of a Ball-bearing Treehopper (B. globulare), made by Alfred Keller, 1953 (Museum of Natural History, Berlin)

This species has very apparent, globular appendages coming out of its thorax. Entomologists are still not certain about the exact purpose of these appendages; however, it has been proposed that the appendages protect them by deterring their predators.
