= Deiroderes =

Scientific classification
- Domain: Eukaryota
- Kingdom: Animalia
- Phylum: Arthropoda
- Class: Insecta
- Order: Hemiptera
- Suborder: Auchenorrhyncha
- Family: Membracidae
- Subfamily: Stegaspidinae
- Genus: Deiroderes; Ramos, 1957

Species
- Deiroderes inermis Ramos, 1957; Deiroderes inornatus Cryan & Deitz, 2002; Deiroderes punctatus (Metcalf & Bruner, 1925)

Genus of insects

Deiroderes is a genus of treehoppers in the subfamily Stegaspidinae. It contains 2 species.

== Distribution ==
Deiroderes is found across the Greater Antilles in the Caribbean.
