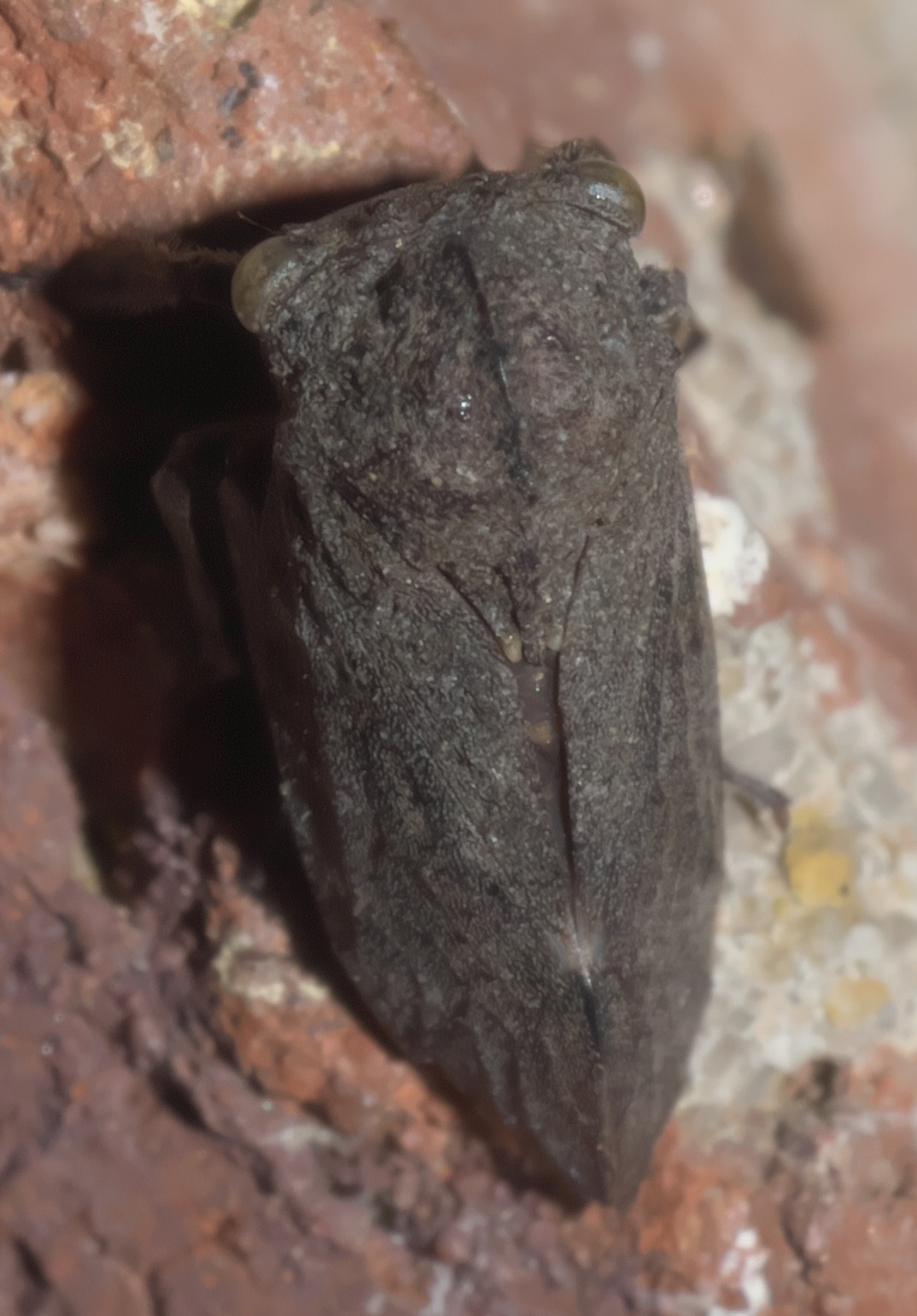
- Microcentrus caryae

Scientific classification
- Domain: Eukaryota
- Kingdom: Animalia
- Phylum: Arthropoda
- Class: Insecta
- Order: Hemiptera
- Suborder: Auchenorrhyncha
- Family: Membracidae
- Subfamily: Stegaspidinae
- Genus: Microcentrus; Stal, 1869

= Microcentrus =

Genus of treehoppers

Microcentrus is a genus of treehoppers in the family Membracidae. There are about 10 described species in Microcentrus.

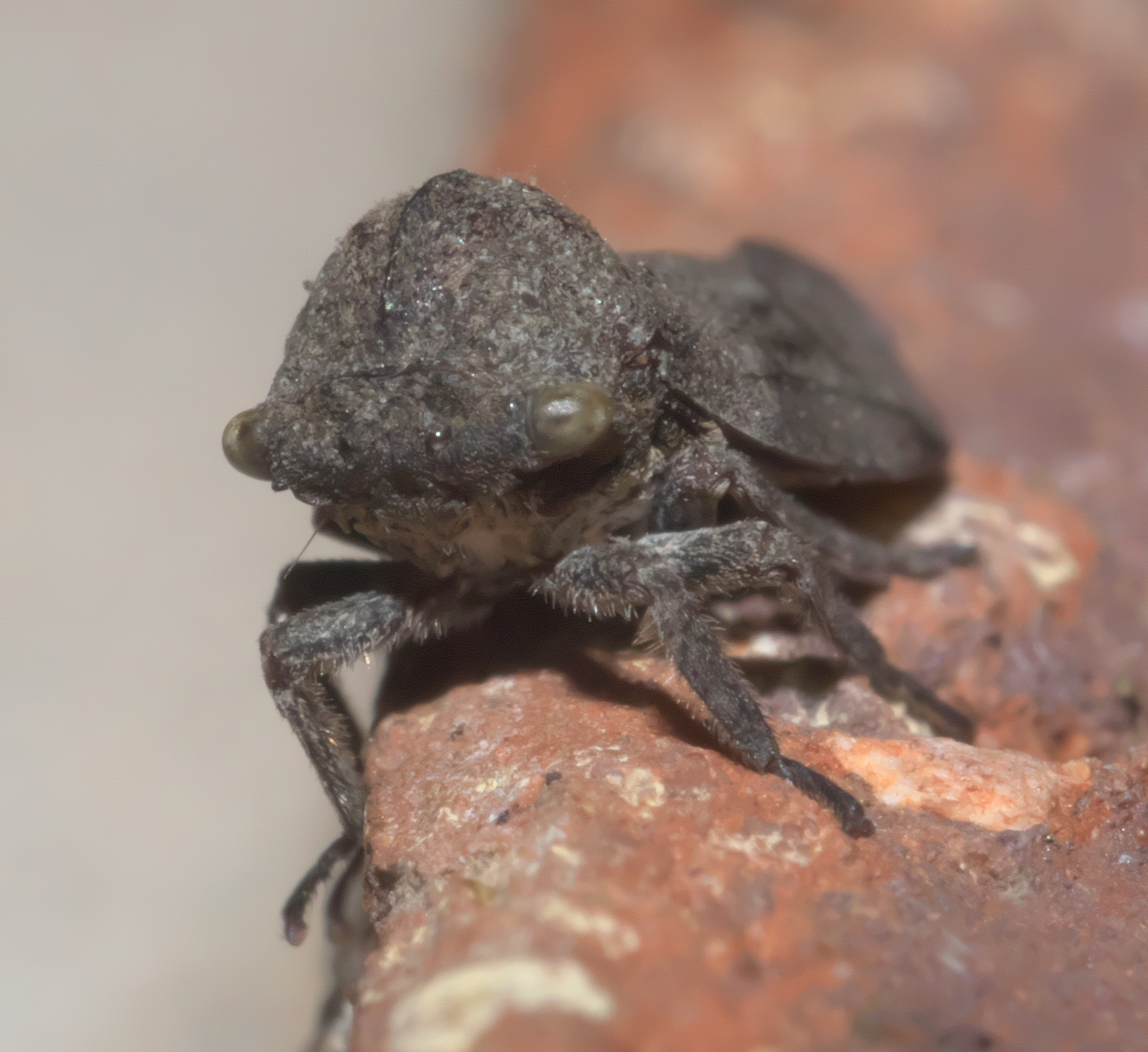
Microcentrus caryae

== Species ==
These 10 species belong to the genus Microcentrus:

- Microcentrus auritus Ball 1933^{c g}
- Microcentrus caryae (Fitch, 1851)^{c g b} (hickory stegaspidine treehopper)
- Microcentrus cornutus Fowler^{c g}
- Microcentrus lynx Ball 1933^{c g}
- Microcentrus nicholi Ball 1933^{c g}
- Microcentrus perdita Amyot & Serville^{c g}
- Microcentrus perditus^{b}
- Microcentrus pileatus Fowler^{c g}
- Microcentrus proximus Fowler^{c g}
- Microcentrus sordidus Fowler^{c g}

Data sources: i = ITIS, c = Catalogue of Life, g = GBIF, b = Bugguide.net
