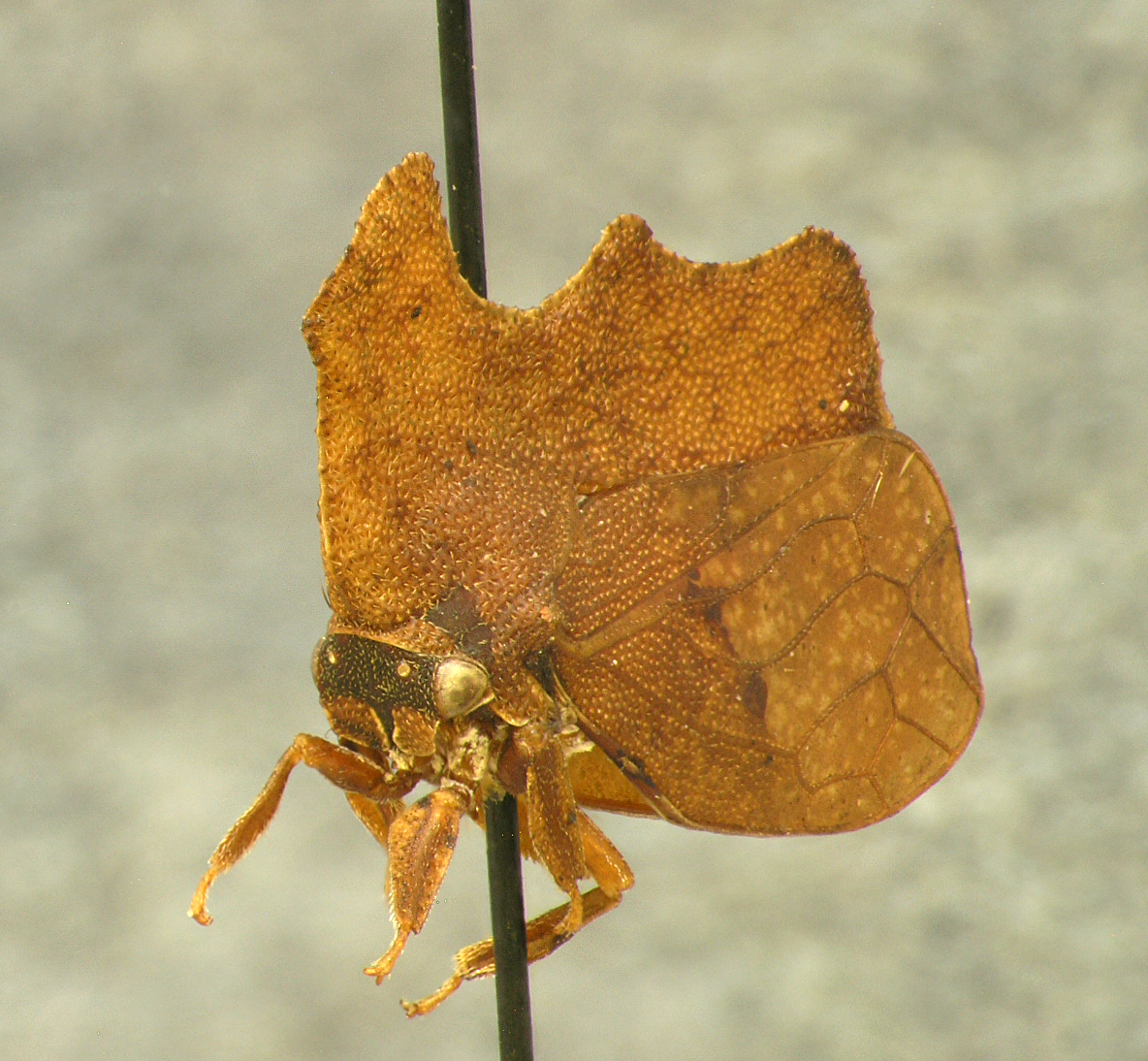

Scientific classification
- Domain: Eukaryota
- Kingdom: Animalia
- Phylum: Arthropoda
- Class: Insecta
- Order: Hemiptera
- Suborder: Auchenorrhyncha
- Family: Membracidae
- Subfamily: Stegaspidinae
- Genus: Stegaspis; Germar, 1833

Type species
- Cicada fronditia Linnaeus, 1758

= Stegaspis =

Genus of insects

Stegaspis is a genus of treehoppers belonging to the subfamily Stegaspidinae in the family Membracidae. It is the type genus of the subfamily Stegaspidinae, and contains 2 species.

- Stegaspis bracteata
- Stegaspis fronditia
