= Flexocentrus =

Scientific classification
- Domain: Eukaryota
- Kingdom: Animalia
- Phylum: Arthropoda
- Class: Insecta
- Order: Hemiptera
- Suborder: Auchenorrhyncha
- Family: Membracidae
- Subfamily: Stegaspidinae
- Genus: Flexocentrus; Goding, 1926
- Species: F. felinus

Binomial name
- Flexocentrus felinus (Haviland, 1925)

Synonyms
- Flexocentrus brunneus

Genus of insects

Flexocentrus is a genus of treehoppers in the subfamily Stegaspidinae. It contains the single species Flexocentrus felinus.
