= Alfred Keller (sculptor) =

German sculptor

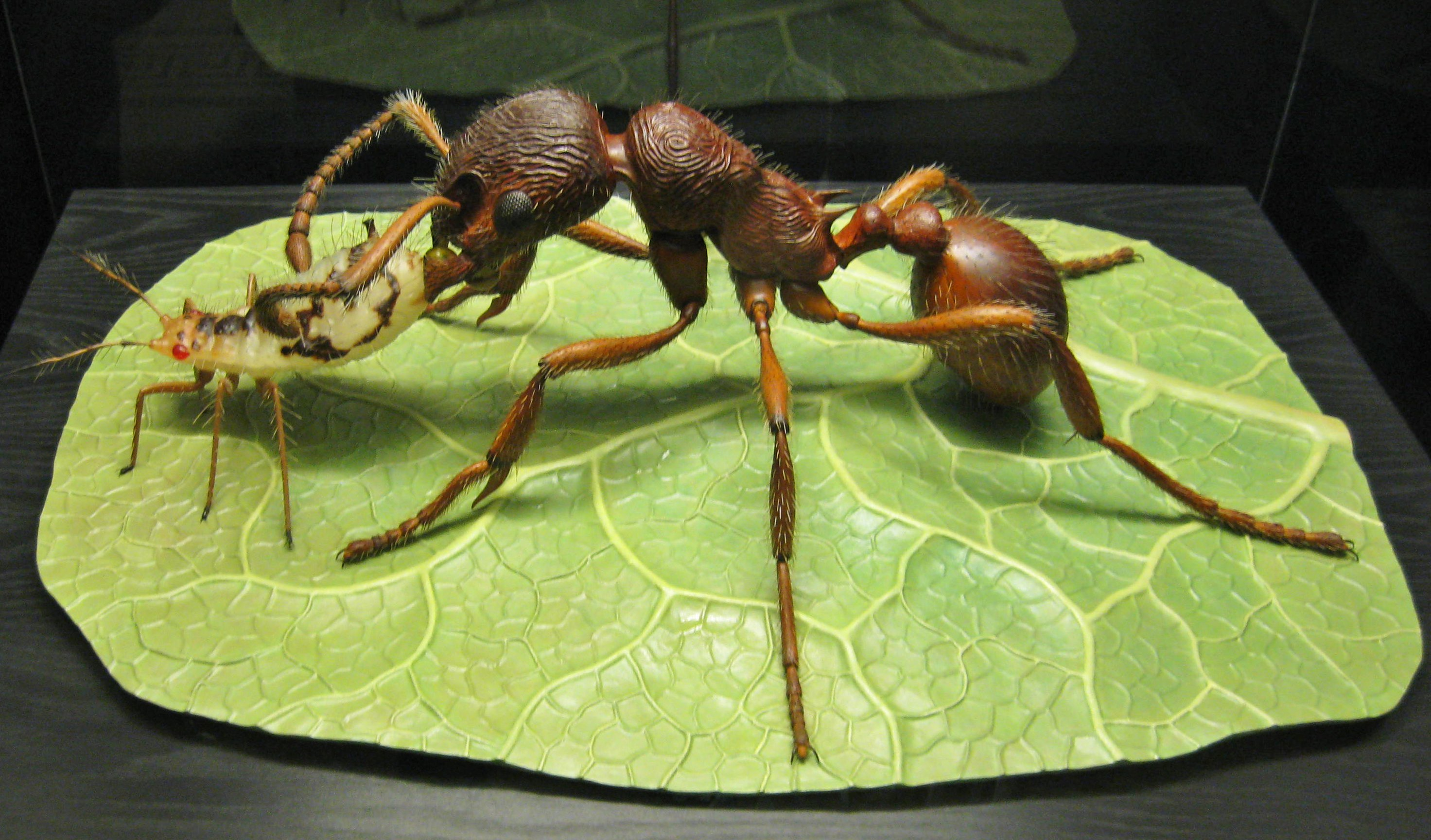
Alfred Keller ant model on display at Museum für Naturkunde

Alfred Keller (1902–1955) was a German museum artist who created large models of insects and other small animals; these models are unique for their impressive attention to detail.

Keller was employed at the Museum für Naturkunde (Museum of Natural History) in Berlin, Germany from 1930 until his death in 1955, and his sculptures can still be found there. He worked with papier-mâché and several other materials such as celluloid and galalith to create models of insects including a flea (1930, 100:1 scale), a housefly (1932, 50:1 scale), a mosquito in flight (1937, 60:1 scale), a Colorado potato beetle (1940, 50:1 scale), and a ball bearer leafhopper (Bocydium globulare, 1953, 180:1 scale), among others. The housefly, typical of the painstaking attention to detail shown in Keller's sculptures, includes 2,653 bristles. Each model took about a year to complete.

== Works ==
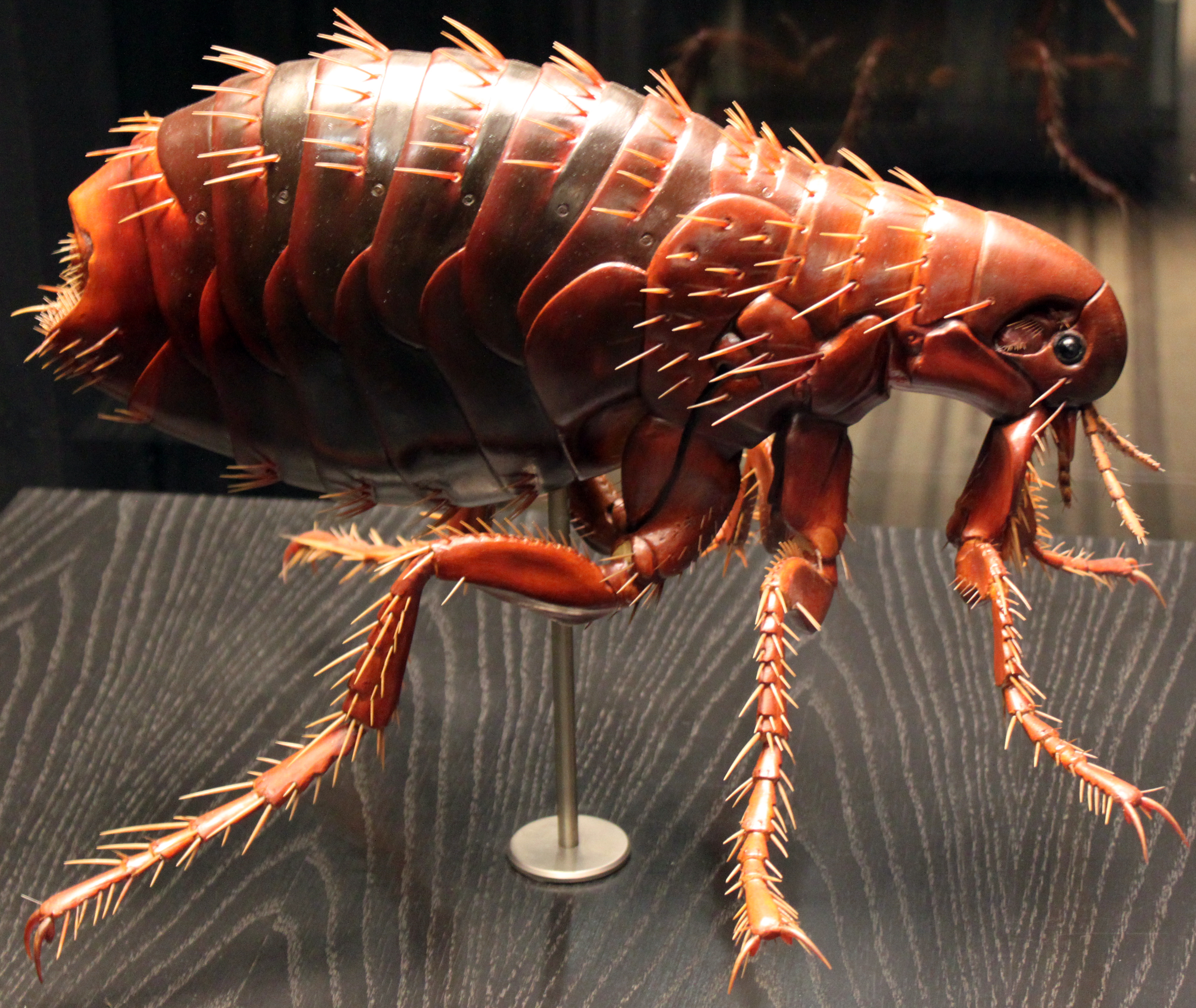
flea (1930, 100:1 scale)

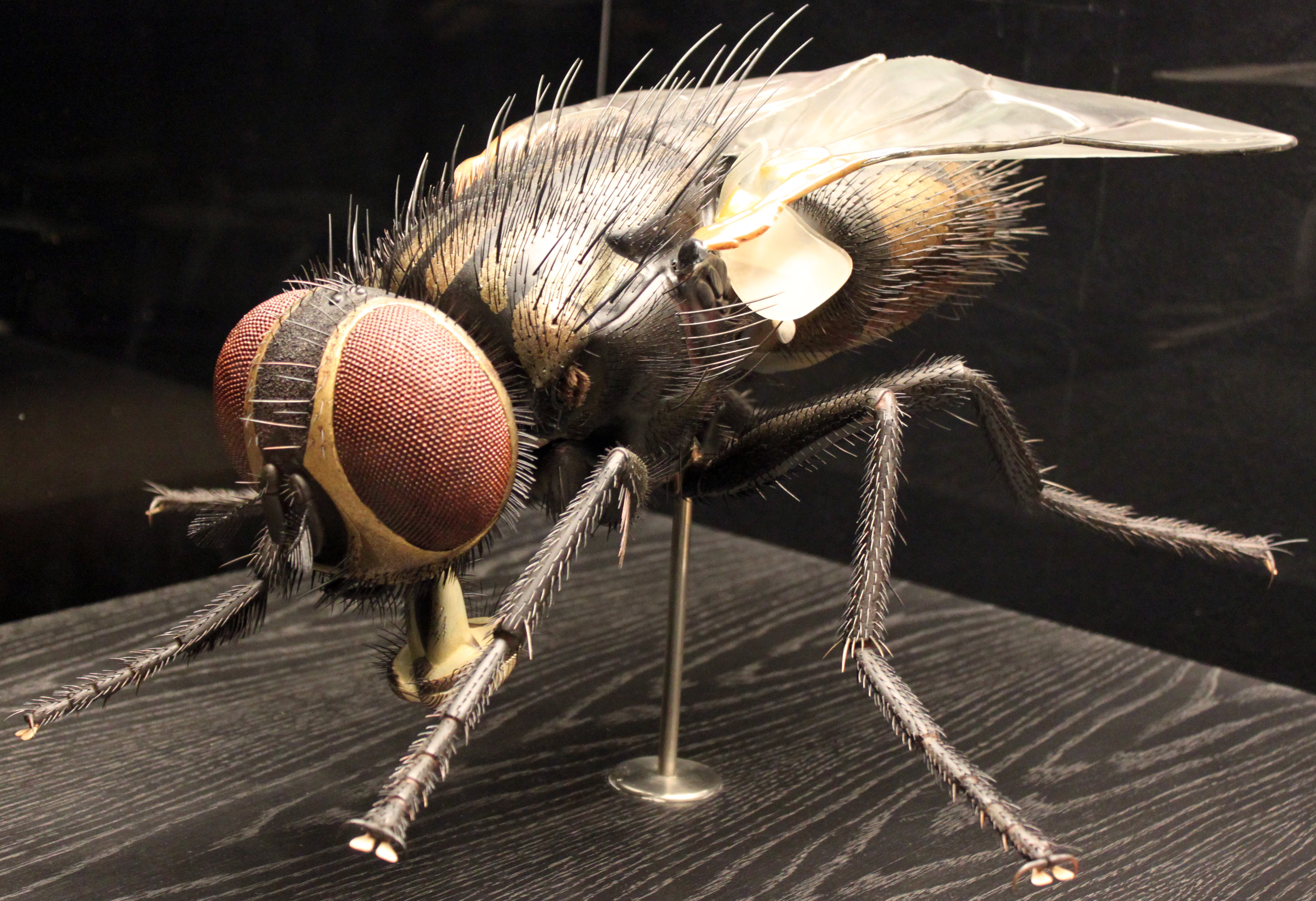
housefly (1932, 50:1 scale)

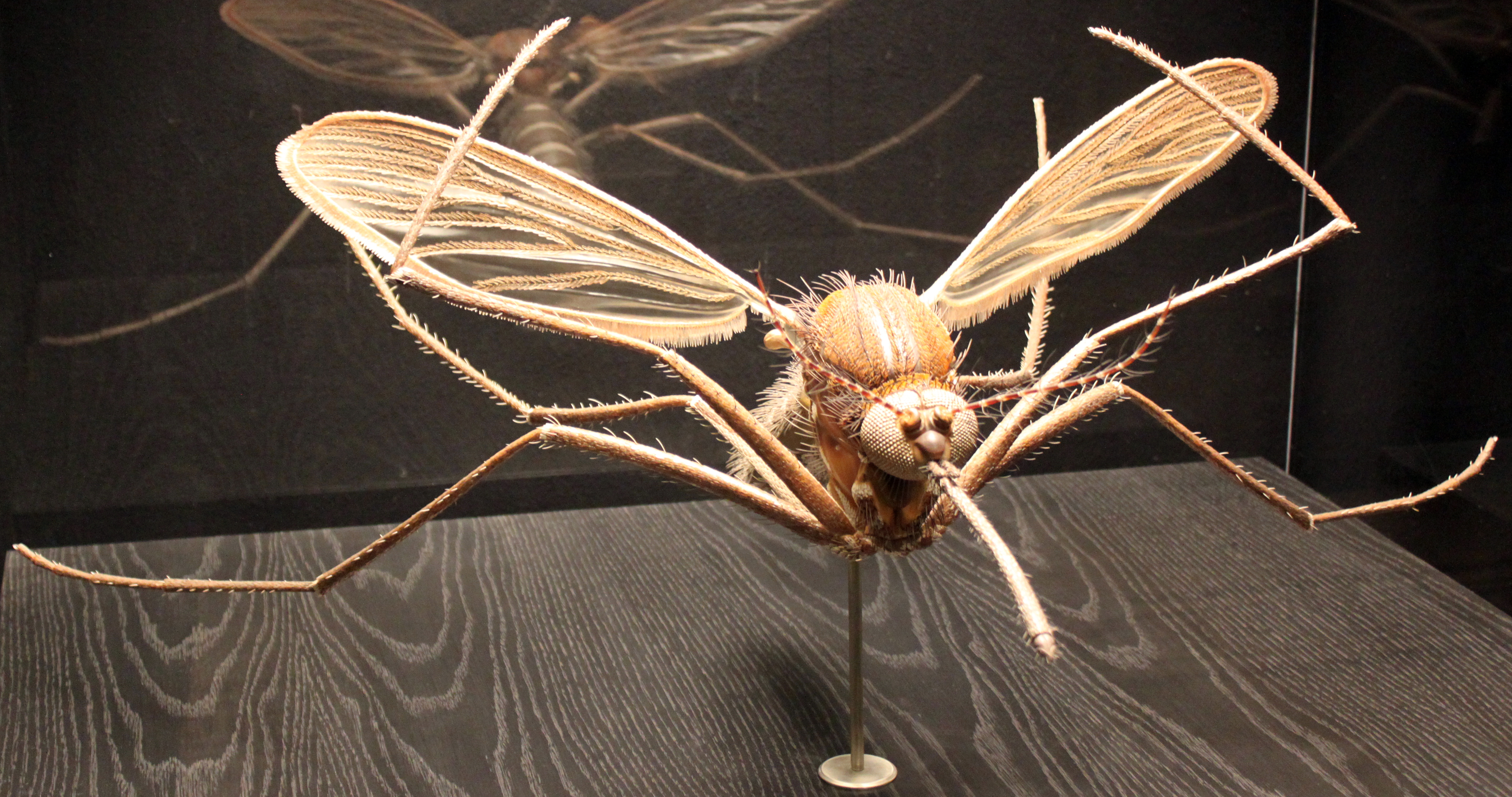
mosquito in flight (1937, 60:1 scale)

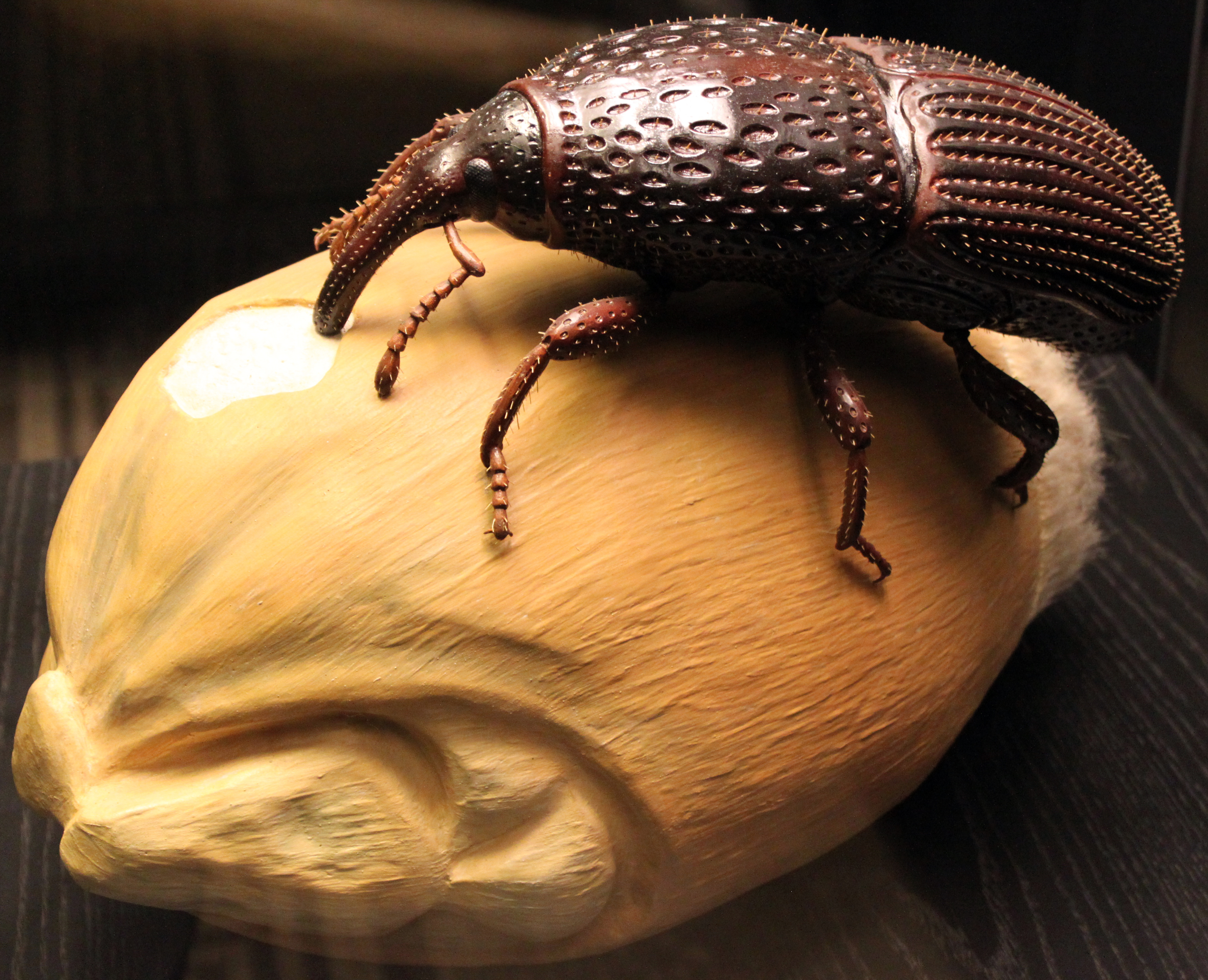
Wheat weevil (1940, 50:1 scale)

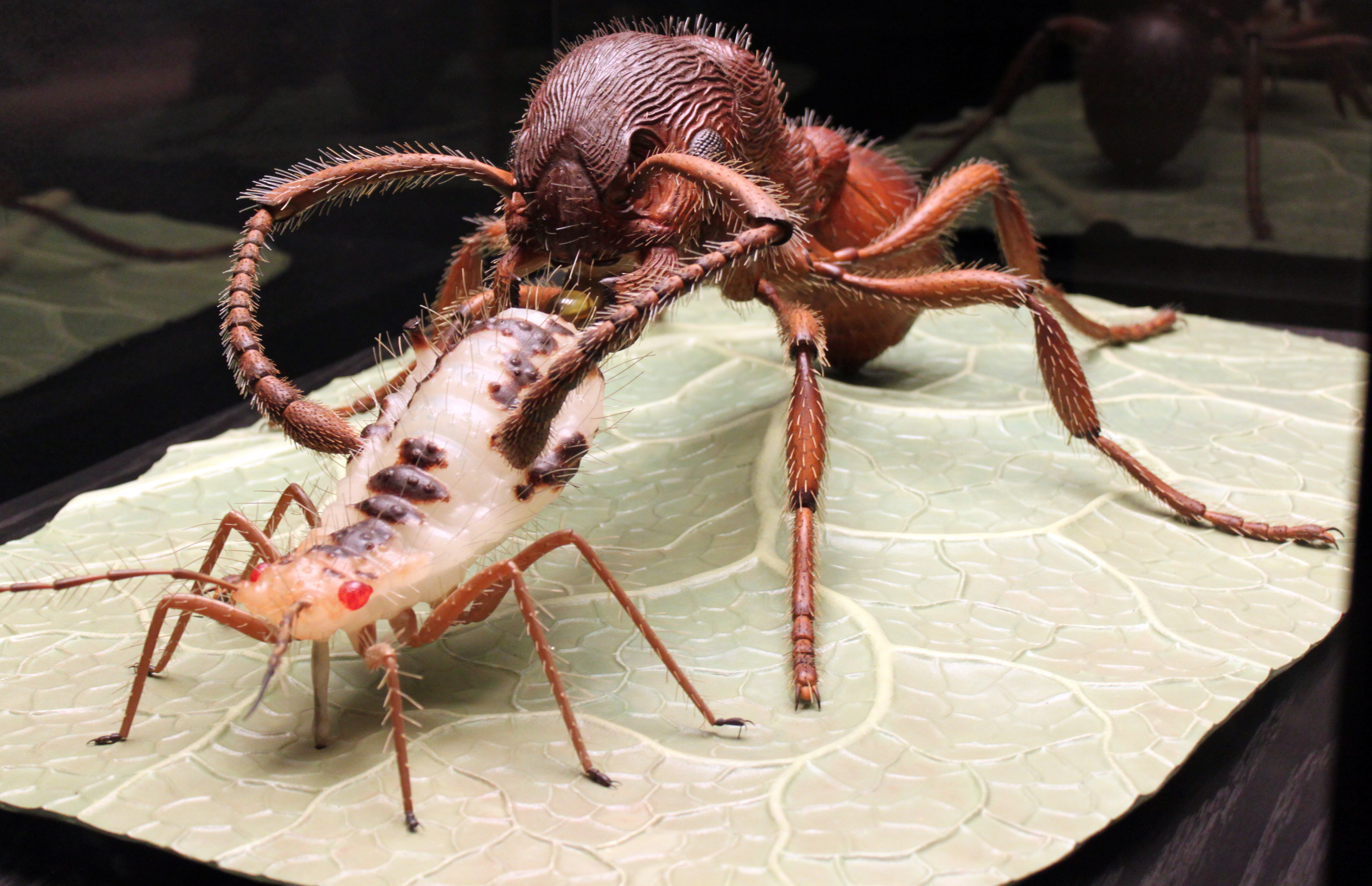
Myrmica rubra with Aphid, 1944, 100:1 scale, 1947 reconstruction of a model destroyed in World War II

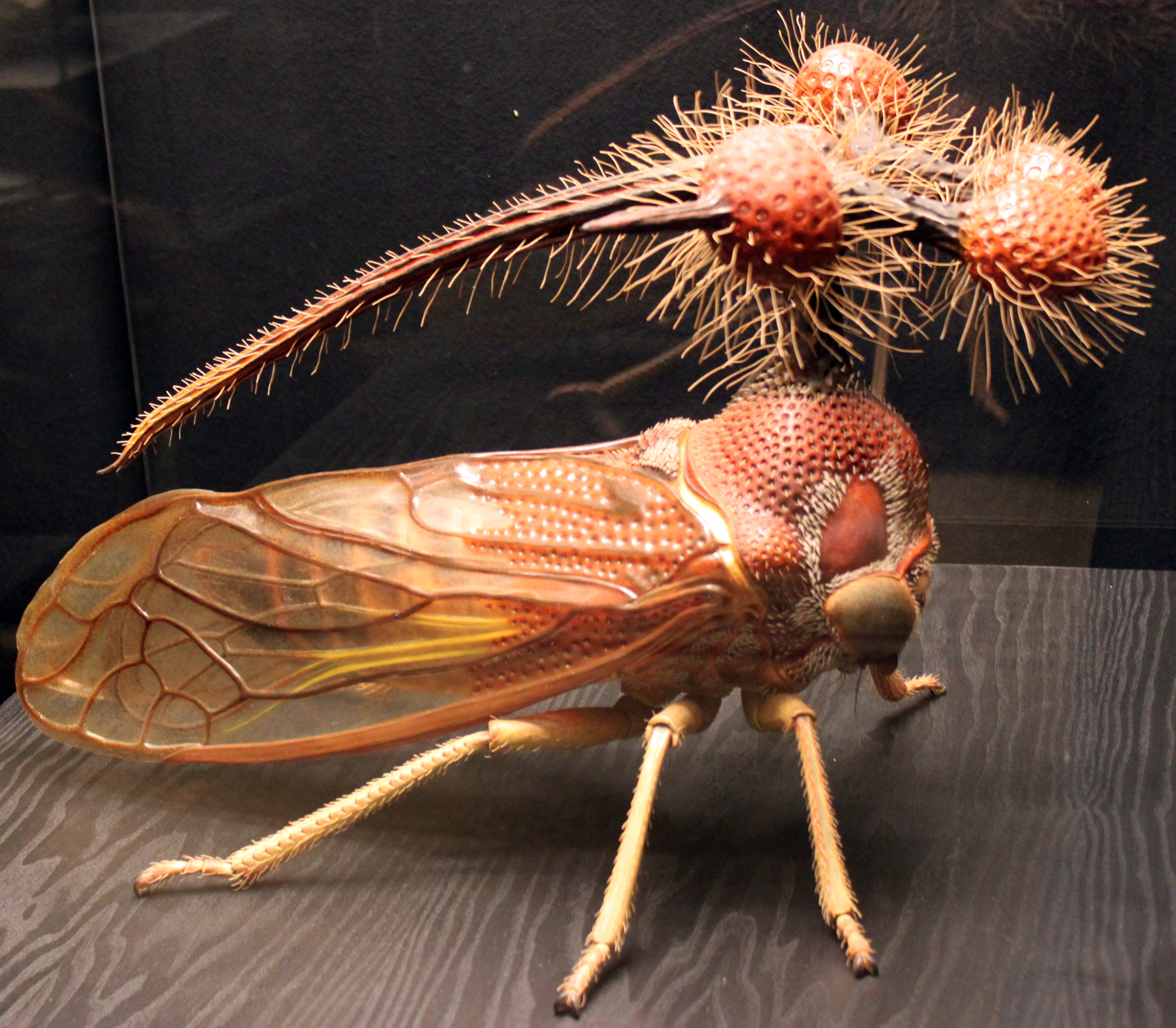
ball bearer treehopper (Bocydium globulare, 1953, 180:1 scale)
