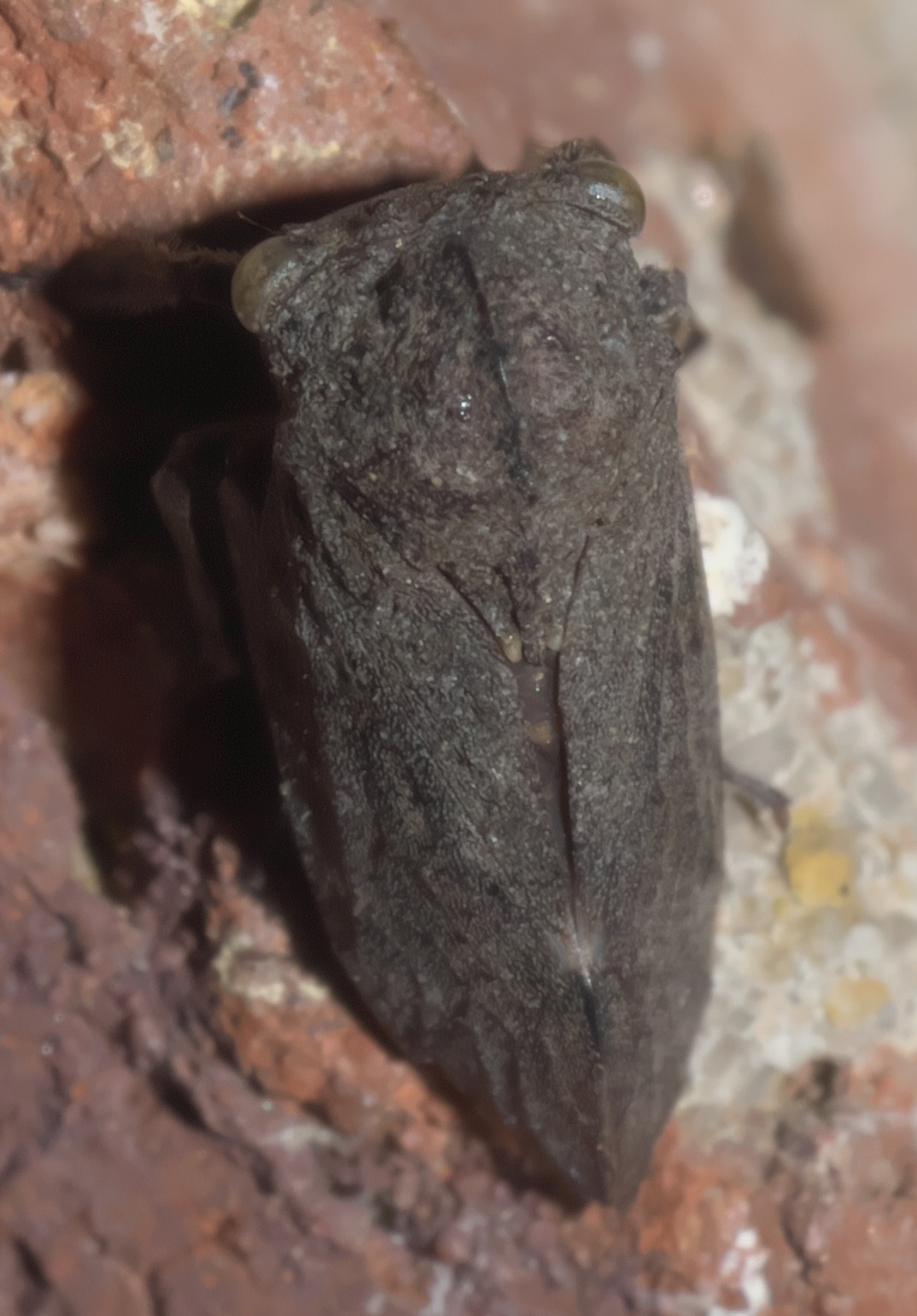

Scientific classification
- Domain: Eukaryota
- Kingdom: Animalia
- Phylum: Arthropoda
- Class: Insecta
- Order: Hemiptera
- Suborder: Auchenorrhyncha
- Family: Membracidae
- Genus: Microcentrus
- Species: M. caryae

Binomial name
- Microcentrus caryae (Fitch, 1851)

Synonyms
- Uroxiphus caryae Fitch 1851 Centrotus caryae (Fitch); Walker 1852a: 1147. Ledra caryae (Fitch); Glover 1878a: 2. Phaulocentrus caryae (Fitch); Fowler 1896

= Microcentrus caryae =

Species of true bug

Microcentrus caryae, the hickory stegaspidine treehopper, is a species of treehopper in the family Membracidae.

== Appearance ==
M. caryae is grayish-brown colored, but can sometimes be grayish-purple. It has a short, small, rounded pronotum, which is unlike other treehoppers.

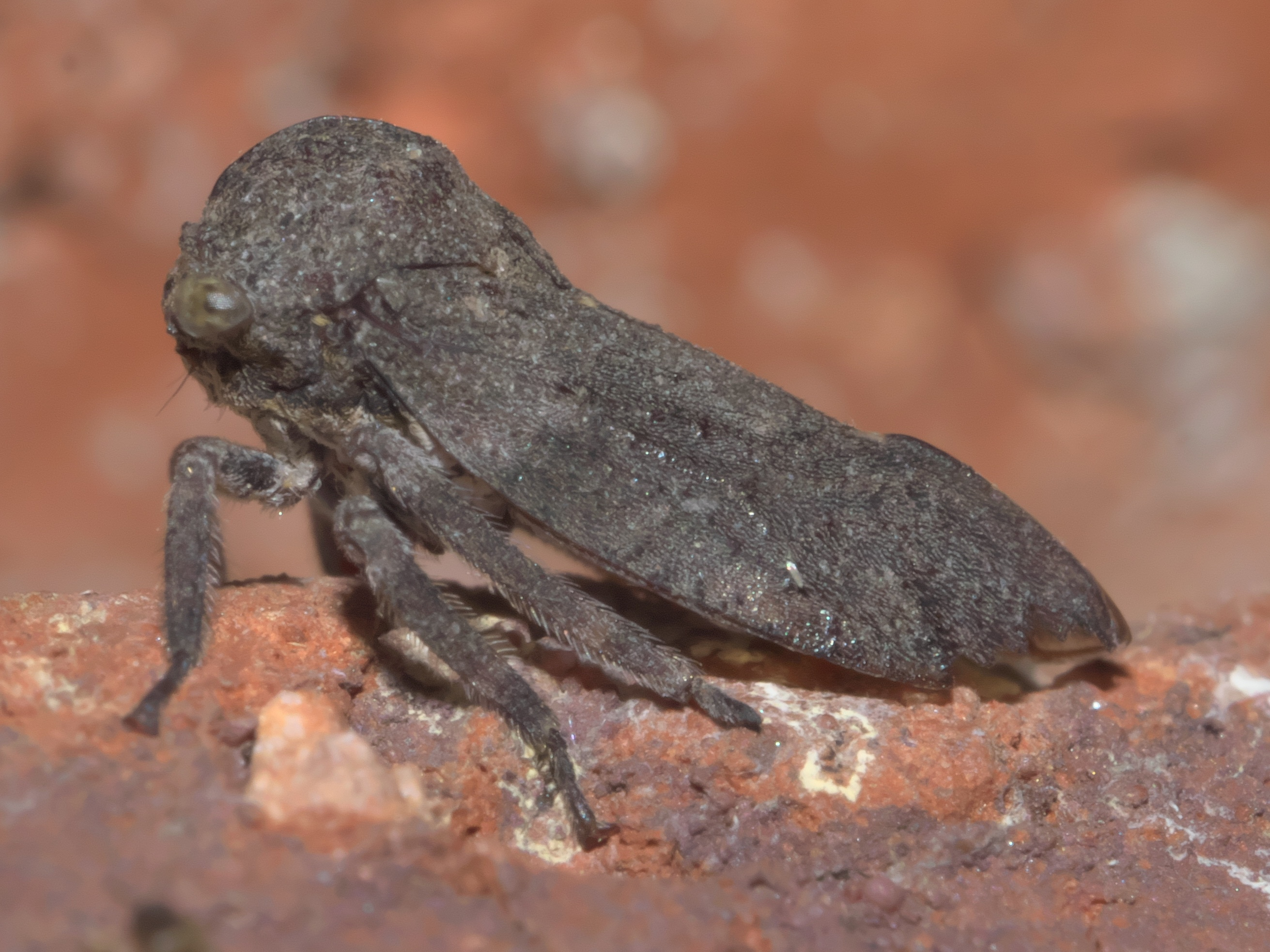
Hickory stegaspidine treehopper, Microcentrus caryae

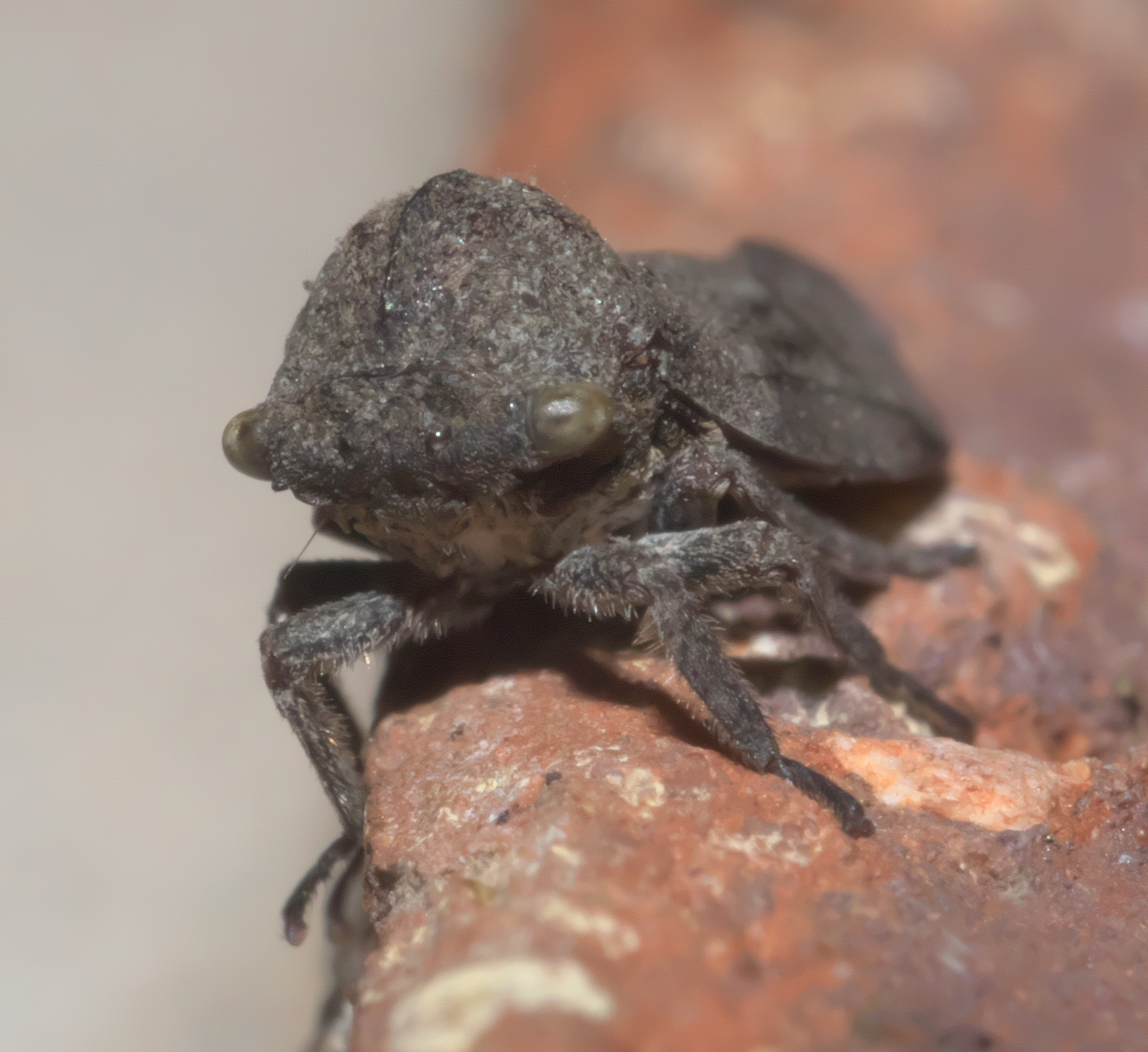
Hickory stegaspidine treehopper, Microcentrus caryae
