= List of Capnia species =

These 106 species belong to Capnia, a genus of small winter stoneflies in the family Capniidae.

== Capnia species ==
- Capnia affinis Morton, 1896
- Capnia ahngeri Koponen, 1949
- Capnia aligera Zapekina-Dulkeit, 1975
- Capnia alternata Zapekina-Dulkeit, 1975
- Capnia ansobiensis Zhiltzova, 1974
- Capnia arensi Zhiltzova, 1964
- Capnia asakawaena Kohno, 1952
- Capnia atra Morton, 1896
- Capnia badakhshanica Zhiltzova, 1974
- Capnia bargusinica Zapekina-Dulkeit, 1975
- Capnia bicornata Alouf, 1992
- Capnia bicuspidata Zhiltzova, 1974
- Capnia bifida Jewett, 1960
- Capnia bimaculata Zhiltzova, 1969
- Capnia bituberculata Uéno, 1929
- Capnia breviptera Kawai, 1957
- Capnia californica Claassen, 1924
- Capnia caryi Baumann & Jacobi, 2002
- Capnia cheama Ricker, 1965
- Capnia coloradensis Claassen, 1937
- Capnia confusa Claassen, 1936
- Capnia cordata Kimmins, 1947
- Capnia elongata Claassen, 1924
- Capnia erecta Jewett, 1955
- Capnia excavata Claassen, 1924
- Capnia femina Kawai, 1968
- Capnia fialai Nelson & Baumann, 1990
- Capnia flebilis Kohno, 1952
- Capnia fukushimana Kohno, 1952
- Capnia gibbera Jewett, 1960
- Capnia giulianii Nelson & Baumann, 1987
- Capnia glabra Claassen, 1924
- Capnia gracilaria Claassen, 1924
- Capnia hamifera Zhiltzova, 1969
- Capnia hingstoni Kimmins, 1947
- Capnia hitchcocki Nelson & Baumann, 1987
- Capnia inyo Nelson & Baumann, 1987
- Capnia iturupiensis Zhiltzova, 1980
- Capnia jankowskajae Zhiltzova, 1974
- Capnia japonica Okamoto, 1922
- Capnia jewetti Frison, 1942
- Capnia kersti Nelson, 2004
- Capnia khubsugulica Zhiltzova & Varykhanova, 1987
- Capnia kibuneana Kawai, 1957
- Capnia kolymensis Zhiltzova, 1981
- Capnia kurnakovi Zhiltzova, 1978
- Capnia lacustra Jewett, 1965
- Capnia lepnevae Zapekina-Dulkeit, 1957
- Capnia levanidovae Kawai, 1969
- Capnia licina Jewett, 1954
- Capnia lineata Hanson, 1943
- Capnia longicauda Zhiltzova, 1969
- Capnia manii Jewett, 1958
- Capnia mariposa Nelson & Baumann, 1987
- Capnia melia Frison, 1942
- Capnia mitsuseana Hanada, 2018
- Capnia montana Kimmins, 1947
- Capnia montivaga Kimmins, 1947
- Capnia naebensis Kawai, 1967
- Capnia nana Claassen, 1924
- Capnia naraiensis Kawai, 1957
- Capnia nearctica Banks, 1919
- Capnia nelsoni Kondratieff & Baumann, 2002
- Capnia nigra (Pictet, 1833)
- Capnia noshaqensis Kawai, 1966
- Capnia oblata Chen & Du, 2017
- Capnia ophiona Nelson & Baumann, 1987
- Capnia oregona Frison, 1942
- Capnia pedestris Kimmins, 1947
- Capnia petila Jewett, 1954
- Capnia potikhae Zhiltzova, 1996
- Capnia prolongata Zhiltzova, 1969
- Capnia promota Frison, 1937
- Capnia pygmaea (Zetterstedt, 1840)
- Capnia qilianshana Li & Yang, 2009
- Capnia quadrituberosa Hitchcock, 1958
- Capnia rara Zapekina-Dulkeit, 1970
- Capnia regilla Nelson & Baumann, 1987
- Capnia saratoga Nelson & Baumann, 1987
- Capnia scobina Jewett, 1966
- Capnia sextuberculata Jewett, 1954
- Capnia shasta Nelson & Baumann, 2009
- Capnia shirahatae Kohno, 1952
- Capnia shugnanica Zhiltzova, 1974
- Capnia sidimiensis Zhiltzova, 1979
- Capnia singularis Zhiltzova, 1974
- Capnia spinulosa Claassen, 1937
- Capnia storkani Šámal, 1935
- Capnia takahashii Okamoto, 1922
- Capnia tibetana Kimmins, 1947
- Capnia triangulipennis Jewett, 1975
- Capnia trispinosa Chen & Du, 2017
- Capnia tshukotica Zhiltzova & Levanidova, 1978
- Capnia uintahi Gaufin, 1964
- Capnia umpqua Frison, 1942 (umpqua snowfly)
- Capnia valhalla Nelson & Baumann, 1987
- Capnia ventura Nelson & Baumann, 1987
- Capnia vernalis Newport, 1848
- Capnia vidua Klapálek, 1904
- Capnia willametta Jewett, 1955
- Capnia xiei Chen & Du, 2017
- Capnia yasumatsui (Kohno, 1951)
- Capnia yunnana Li & Yang, 2011
- Capnia zaicevi Klapálek, 1914
- Capnia zijinshana Du & Chen, 2016
- Capnia zukeli Hanson, 1943 (Idaho snowfly)
