= Bolshecapnia =

Scientific classification
- Domain: Eukaryota
- Kingdom: Animalia
- Phylum: Arthropoda
- Class: Insecta
- Order: Plecoptera
- Family: Capniidae
- Genus: Bolshecapnia; Ricker, 1965

Genus of stoneflies

Bolshecapnia is a genus of small winter stoneflies in the family Capniidae. There are at least four described species in Bolshecapnia.

Bolshecapnia was described in 1965 as a subgenus of Capnia, but has since been elevated to the rank of genus. In 2019 the species Bolshecapnia missiona and Bolshecapnia sasquatchi were determined to be distinct from the other species of Bolshecapnia, and were placed in the new genus Sasquacapnia. In addition, the species Bolshecapnia maculata was placed in the new genus Eurekapnia.

== Species ==
These four species belong to the genus Bolshecapnia:

- Bolshecapnia gregsoni (Ricker, 1965)
- Bolshecapnia milami (Nebeker & Gaufin, 1967)
- Bolshecapnia rogozera (Ricker, 1965)
- Bolshecapnia spenceri (Ricker, 1965)
