= Utacapnia trava =

Scientific classification
- Domain: Eukaryota
- Kingdom: Animalia
- Phylum: Arthropoda
- Class: Insecta
- Order: Plecoptera
- Family: Capniidae
- Genus: Utacapnia
- Species: U. trava

Binomial name
- Utacapnia trava (Nebeker & Gaufin, 1965)

Species of stonefly

Utacapnia trava, the Yellowstone snowfly, is a species of small winter stonefly in the family Capniidae. It is found in North America.
