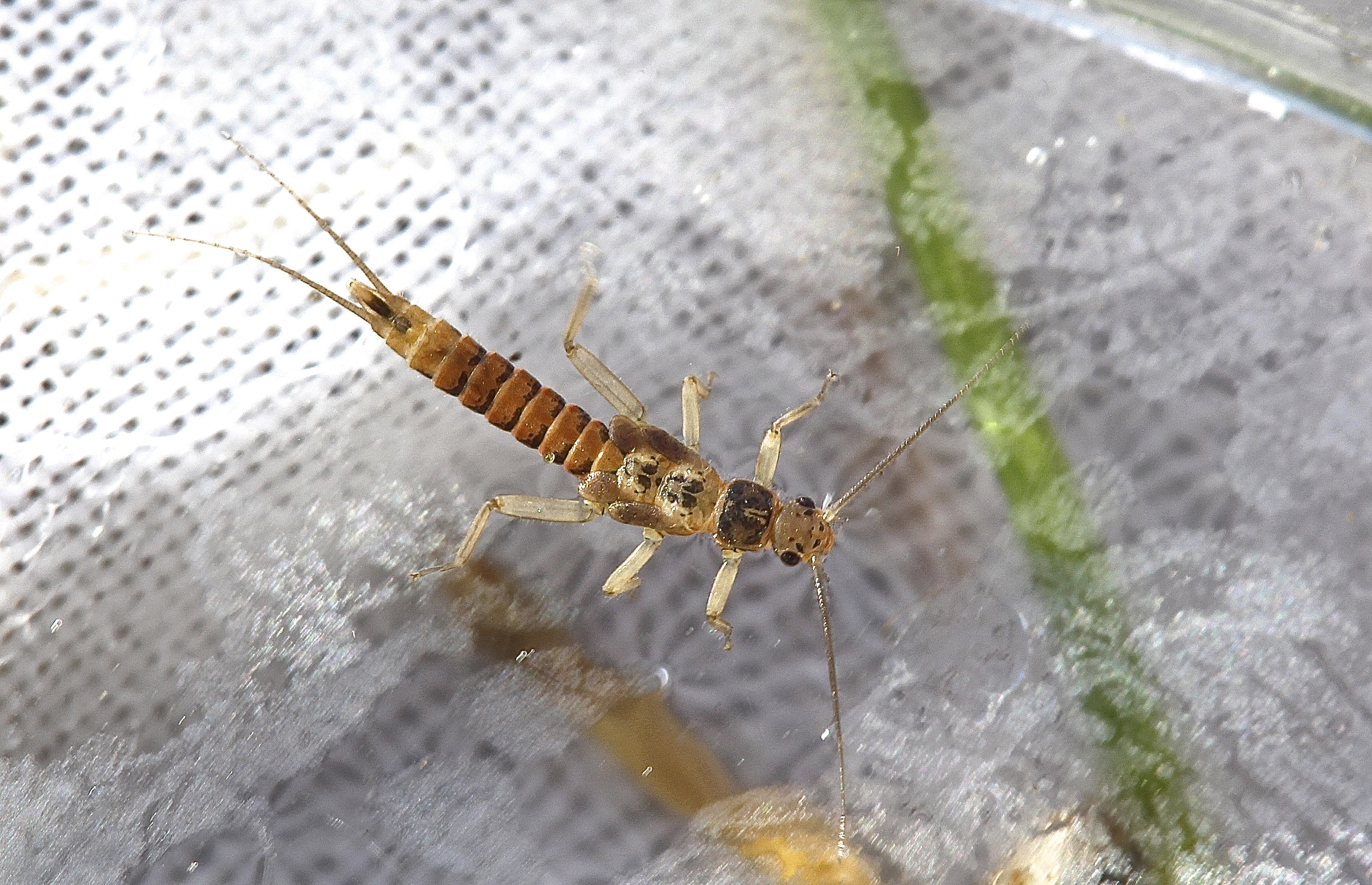
- Small winter stonefly, Allocapnia pygmaea

Scientific classification
- Kingdom: Animalia
- Phylum: Arthropoda
- Class: Insecta
- Order: Plecoptera
- Family: Capniidae
- Genus: Allocapnia
- Species: A. pygmaea

Binomial name
- Allocapnia pygmaea (Burmeister, 1839)

= Allocapnia pygmaea =

Species of stonefly

Allocapnia pygmaea, the pygmy snowfly, is a species of small winter stonefly in the family Capniidae. It is found in North America.

Allocapnia pygmaea is a species of Allocapnia, and the family Capniidae.
