= Capnia zukeli =

Conservation status
- Critically Imperiled (NatureServe)

Scientific classification
- Kingdom: Animalia
- Phylum: Arthropoda
- Clade: Pancrustacea
- Class: Insecta
- Order: Plecoptera
- Family: Capniidae
- Genus: Capnia
- Species: C. zukeli

Binomial name
- Capnia zukeli Hanson, 1943

Species of stonefly

Capnia zukeli, the Idaho snowfly, is a species of small winter stonefly in the family Capniidae. It is found in North America.
