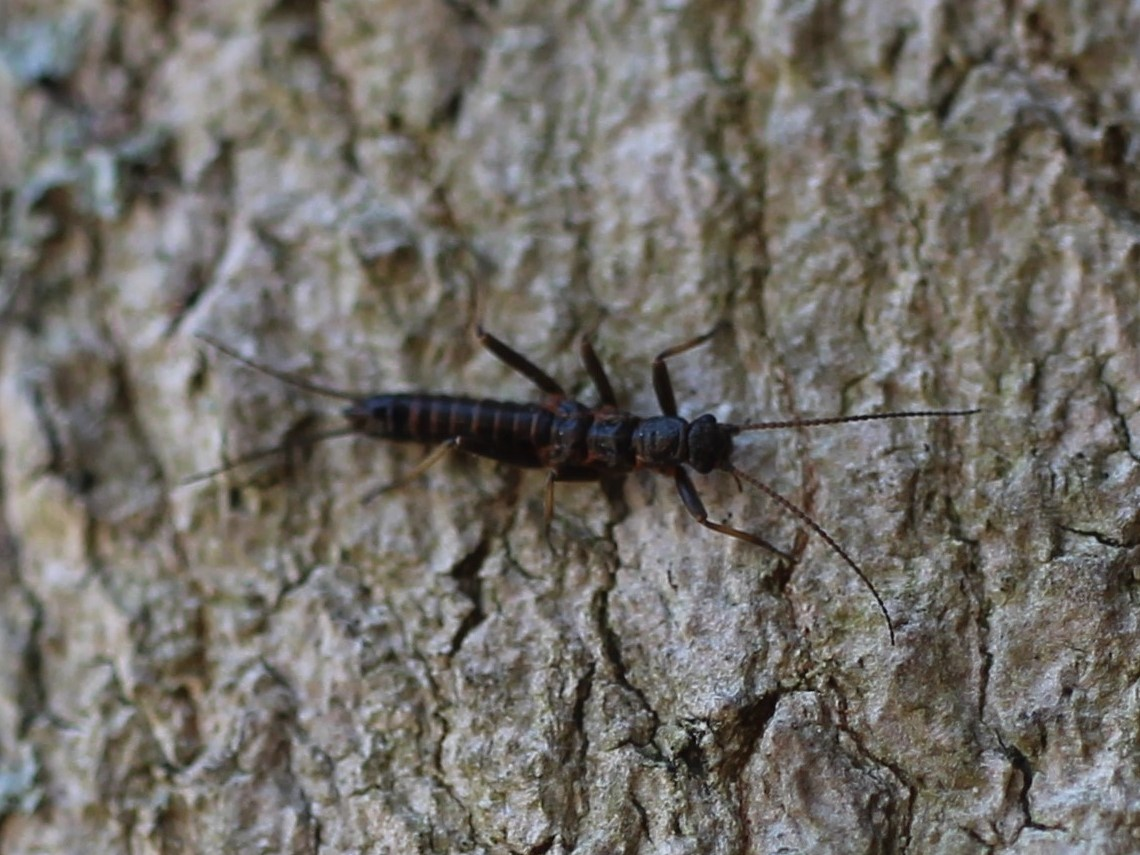

Scientific classification
- Kingdom: Animalia
- Phylum: Arthropoda
- Clade: Pancrustacea
- Class: Insecta
- Order: Plecoptera
- Family: Capniidae
- Genus: Allocapnia
- Species: A. vivipara

Binomial name
- Allocapnia vivipara (Claassen, 1924)

= Allocapnia vivipara =

Species of stonefly

Allocapnia vivipara, the short-wing snowfly, is a species of small winter stonefly in the family Capniidae. It is found in Eastern North America.
