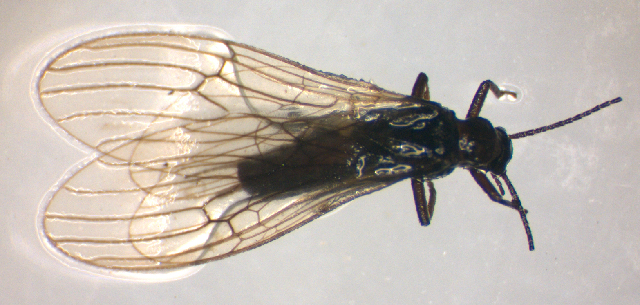

Scientific classification
- Domain: Eukaryota
- Kingdom: Animalia
- Phylum: Arthropoda
- Class: Insecta
- Order: Plecoptera
- Family: Capniidae
- Genus: Capnopsis
- Species: C. schilleri

Binomial name
- Capnopsis schilleri (Rostock, 1892)

= Capnopsis schilleri =

Species of stonefly

Capnopsis schilleri is a species of insect belonging to the family Capniidae.

It is native to Europe.
