= Yoraperla nigrisoma =

Scientific classification
- Domain: Eukaryota
- Kingdom: Animalia
- Phylum: Arthropoda
- Class: Insecta
- Order: Plecoptera
- Family: Peltoperlidae
- Genus: Yoraperla
- Species: Y. nigrisoma

Binomial name
- Yoraperla nigrisoma (Banks, 1948)

Species of stonefly

Yoraperla nigrisoma, the black roachfly, is a species of roach-like stonefly in the family Peltoperlidae. It is found in North America.
