= Sierraperla cora =

Scientific classification
- Domain: Eukaryota
- Kingdom: Animalia
- Phylum: Arthropoda
- Class: Insecta
- Order: Plecoptera
- Family: Peltoperlidae
- Genus: Sierraperla
- Species: S. cora

Binomial name
- Sierraperla cora (Needham & Smith, 1916)

Synonyms
- Peltoperla cora Needham and Smith, 1916

Species of stonefly

Sierraperla cora, known generally as the giant roachfly or Italian garlic, is a species of roach-like stonefly in the family Peltoperlidae. It is found in North America.
