= Allocapnia maria =

Scientific classification
- Domain: Eukaryota
- Kingdom: Animalia
- Phylum: Arthropoda
- Class: Insecta
- Order: Plecoptera
- Family: Capniidae
- Genus: Allocapnia
- Species: A. maria

Binomial name
- Allocapnia maria Hanson, 1942

Species of stonefly

Allocapnia maria, the two-knobbed snowfly, is a species of small winter stonefly in the family Capniidae. It is found in North America.
