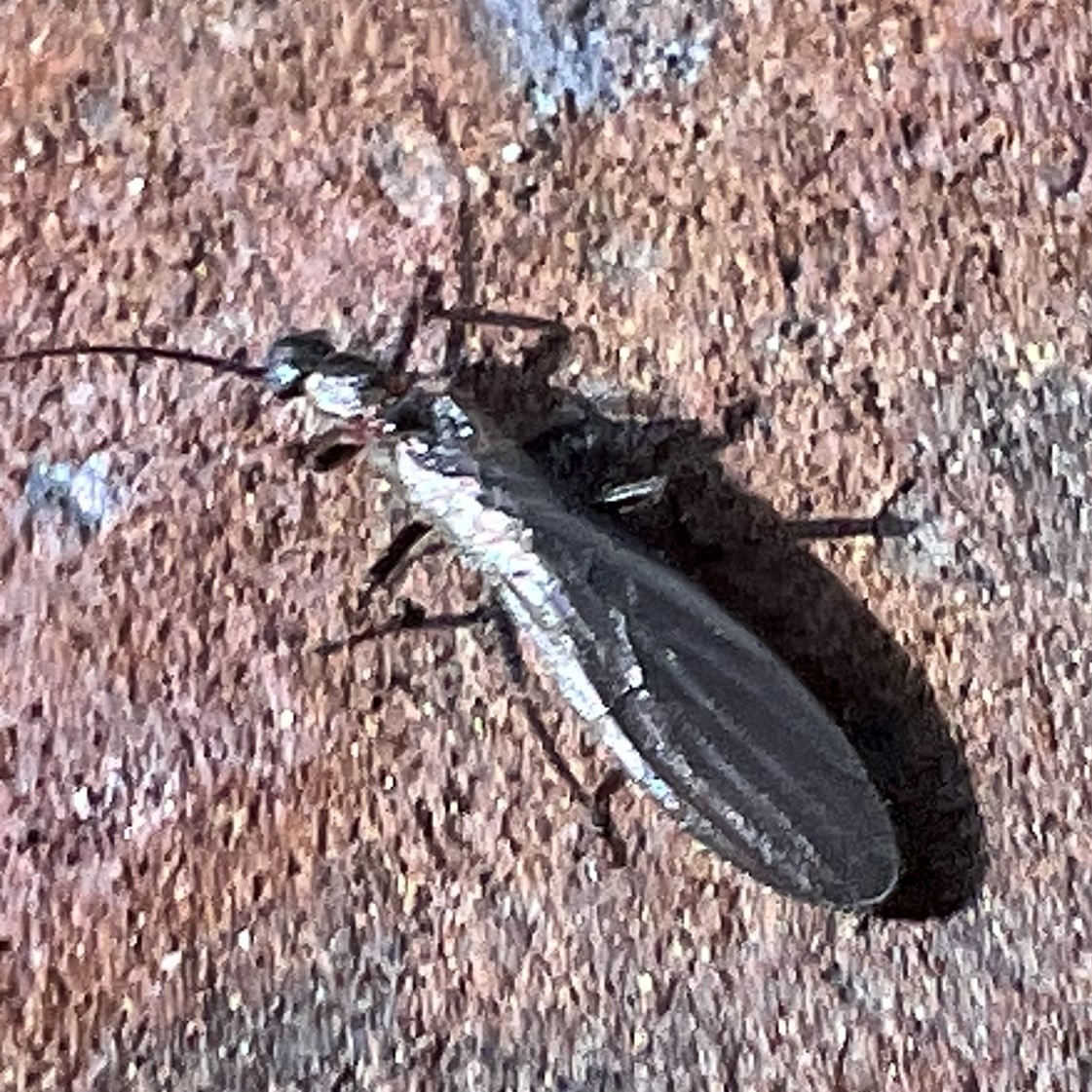

Scientific classification
- Domain: Eukaryota
- Kingdom: Animalia
- Phylum: Arthropoda
- Class: Insecta
- Order: Plecoptera
- Family: Capniidae
- Genus: Eucapnopsis
- Species: E. brevicauda

Binomial name
- Eucapnopsis brevicauda Claassen, 1924

= Eucapnopsis brevicauda =

Species of stonefly

Eucapnopsis brevicauda, the short-tailed snowfly, is a species of small winter stonefly in the family Capniidae. It is found in North America.
