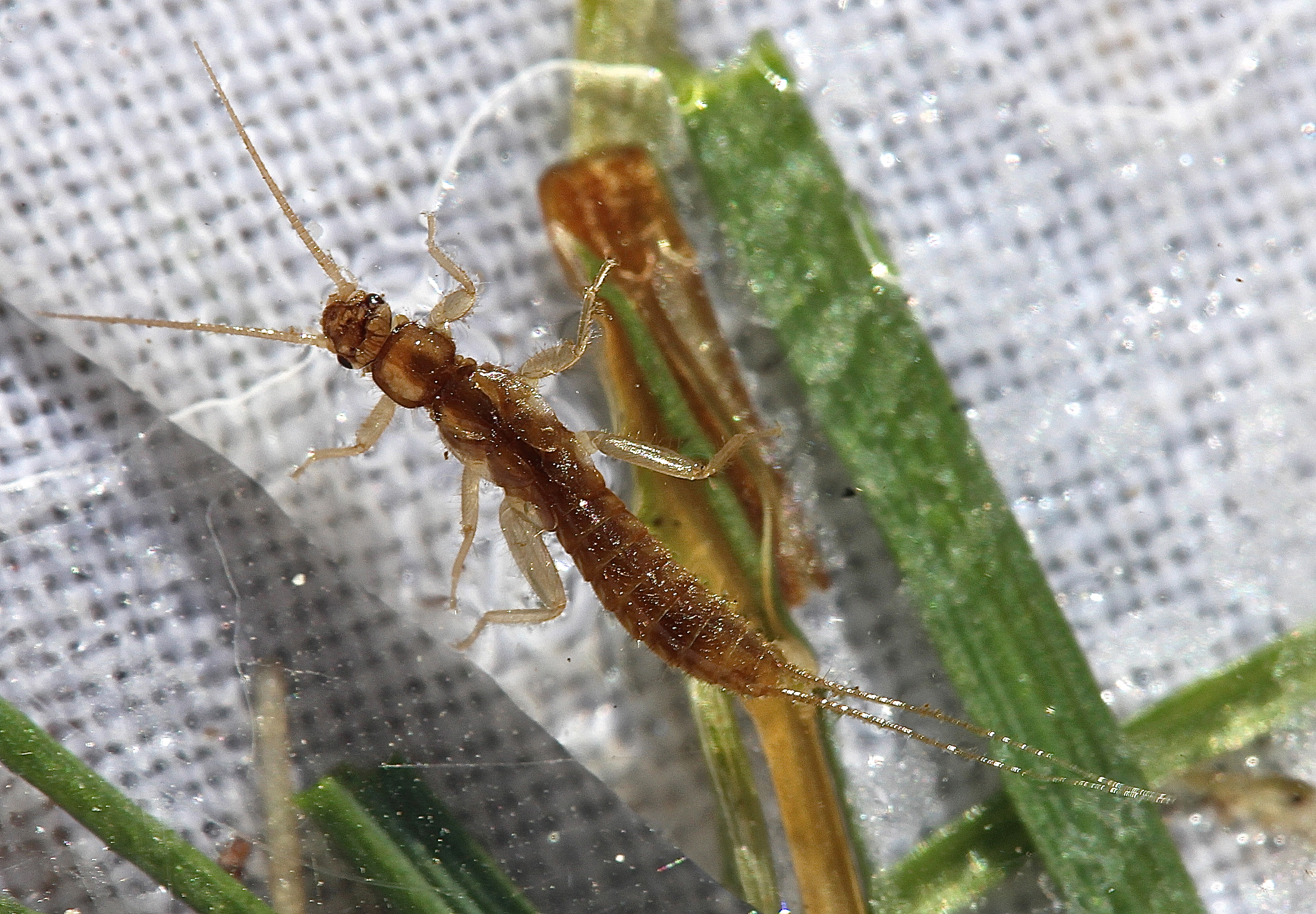

Scientific classification
- Domain: Eukaryota
- Kingdom: Animalia
- Phylum: Arthropoda
- Class: Insecta
- Order: Plecoptera
- Family: Capniidae
- Genus: Paracapnia
- Species: P. angulata

Binomial name
- Paracapnia angulata Hanson, 1961

= Paracapnia angulata =

Species of stonefly

Paracapnia angulata, the angulate snowfly, is a species of small winter stonefly in the family Capniidae. It is found in North America. Its nymph is eaten by the steelhead trout.
