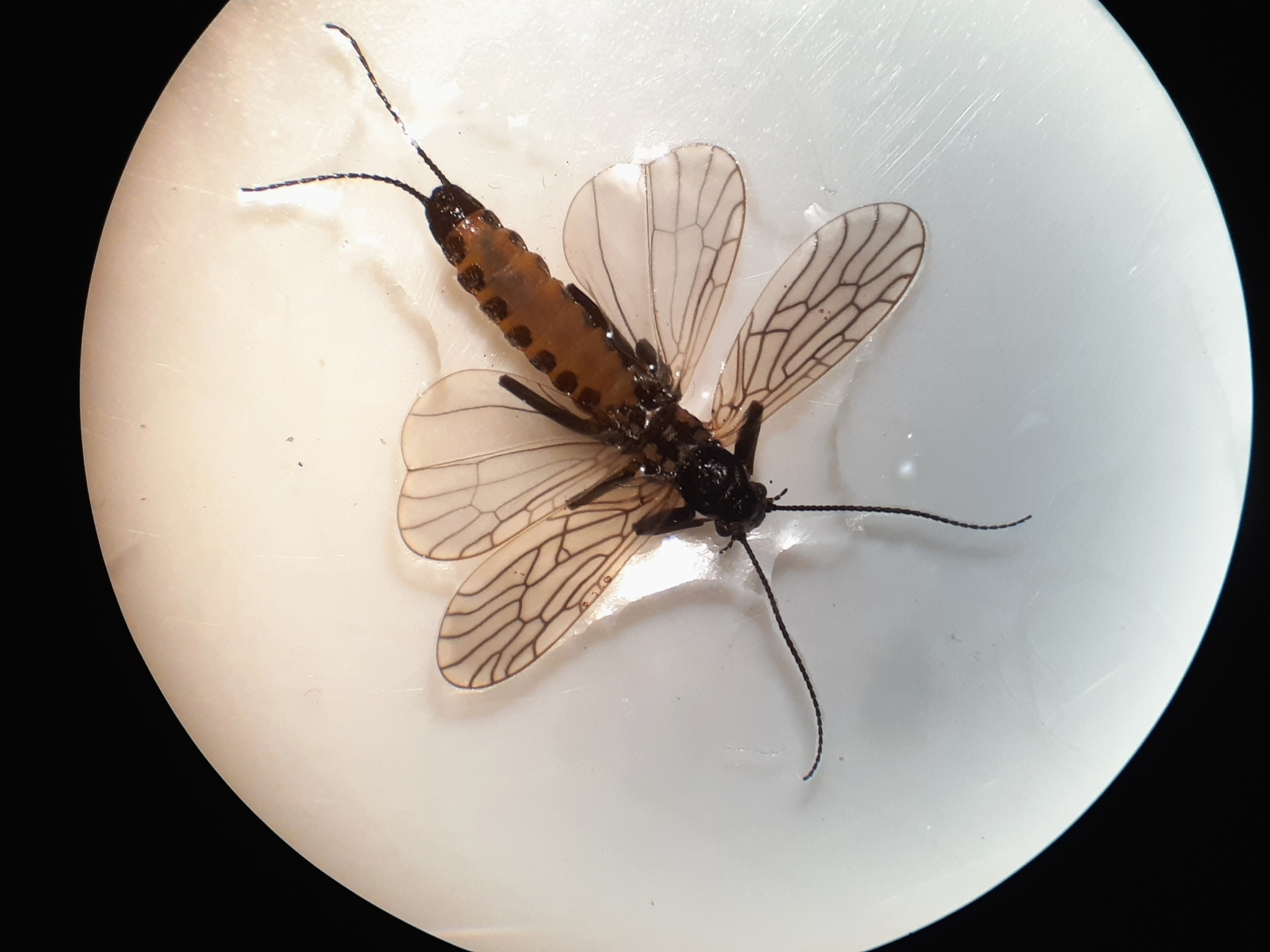

Scientific classification
- Kingdom: Animalia
- Phylum: Arthropoda
- Class: Insecta
- Order: Plecoptera
- Family: Capniidae
- Genus: Allocapnia
- Species: A. granulata

Binomial name
- Allocapnia granulata (Claassen, 1924)

= Allocapnia granulata =

Species of stonefly

Allocapnia granulata is a species of stonefly in the genus Allocapnia. Females typically live longer than males.
