= Allocapnia fumosa =

Conservation status
- Imperiled (NatureServe)

Scientific classification
- Kingdom: Animalia
- Phylum: Arthropoda
- Clade: Pancrustacea
- Class: Insecta
- Order: Plecoptera
- Family: Capniidae
- Genus: Allocapnia
- Species: A. fumosa

Binomial name
- Allocapnia fumosa Ross, 1964

Species of stonefly

Allocapnia fumosa is a stonefly in the family Capniidae. It is commonly known as the Smokies snowfly and is found in the Eastern United States, including North Carolina, Tennessee, and Virginia. It is found in the Great Smoky Mountains, and its species name is Latin for "smoky".

It is a small, winged insect found at fast, rocky streams at high elevations.
