= Paracapnia opis =

Scientific classification
- Domain: Eukaryota
- Kingdom: Animalia
- Phylum: Arthropoda
- Class: Insecta
- Order: Plecoptera
- Family: Capniidae
- Genus: Paracapnia
- Species: P. opis

Binomial name
- Paracapnia opis (Newman, 1839)

Species of stonefly

Paracapnia opis, the northeastern snowfly, is a species of small winter stonefly in the family Capniidae. It is found in North America. Described by Edward Newman in 1839, it was the first known insect in the genus Paracapnia. It is synonymous with Paracapnia curvata (Hanson, 1946).
