= Capnura manitoba =

Scientific classification
- Domain: Eukaryota
- Kingdom: Animalia
- Phylum: Arthropoda
- Class: Insecta
- Order: Plecoptera
- Family: Capniidae
- Genus: Capnura
- Species: C. manitoba

Binomial name
- Capnura manitoba (Claassen, 1924)

Synonyms
- Capnia manitoba Claassen, 1924

Species of stonefly

Capnura manitoba, the Manitoba snowfly, is a species of small winter stonefly in the family Capniidae. It is found in North America.
