= Capnia umpqua =

Scientific classification
- Domain: Eukaryota
- Kingdom: Animalia
- Phylum: Arthropoda
- Class: Insecta
- Order: Plecoptera
- Family: Capniidae
- Genus: Capnia
- Species: C. umpqua

Binomial name
- Capnia umpqua Frison, 1942

Species of stonefly

Capnia umpqua, the umpqua snowfly, is a species of small winter stonefly in the family Capniidae. It is found in North America.
