= Yoraperla mariana =

Scientific classification
- Domain: Eukaryota
- Kingdom: Animalia
- Phylum: Arthropoda
- Class: Insecta
- Order: Plecoptera
- Family: Peltoperlidae
- Genus: Yoraperla
- Species: Y. mariana

Binomial name
- Yoraperla mariana (Ricker, 1943)

Synonyms
- Peltoperla mariana Ricker, 1943

Species of stonefly

Yoraperla mariana, the brown roachfly, is a species of roach-like stonefly in the family Peltoperlidae. It is found in North America.
