= Tallaperla maria =

Scientific classification
- Domain: Eukaryota
- Kingdom: Animalia
- Phylum: Arthropoda
- Class: Insecta
- Order: Plecoptera
- Family: Peltoperlidae
- Genus: Tallaperla
- Species: T. maria

Binomial name
- Tallaperla maria (Needham & Smith, 1916)

Synonyms
- Peltoperla maria Needham and Smith, 1916

Species of stonefly

Tallaperla maria, the common roachfly, is a species of roach-like stonefly in the family Peltoperlidae. It is found in North America.
