= Allocapnia nivicola =

Scientific classification
- Domain: Eukaryota
- Kingdom: Animalia
- Phylum: Arthropoda
- Class: Insecta
- Order: Plecoptera
- Family: Capniidae
- Genus: Allocapnia
- Species: A. nivicola

Binomial name
- Allocapnia nivicola (Fitch, 1847)

Species of stonefly

Allocapnia nivicola, the brook snowfly, is a species of small winter stonefly in the family Capniidae. It is found in North America.
