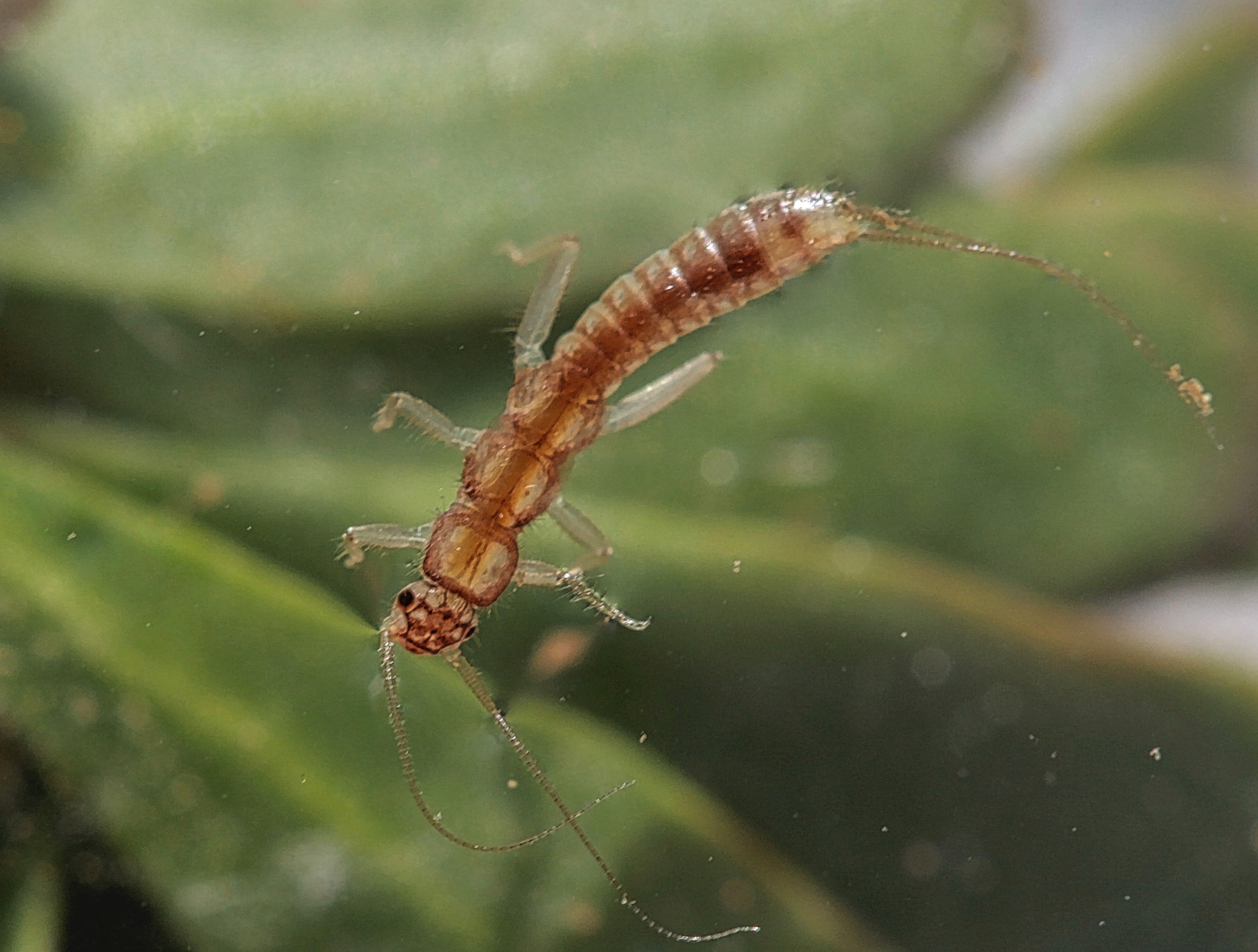
- Paracapnia angulata

Scientific classification
- Domain: Eukaryota
- Kingdom: Animalia
- Phylum: Arthropoda
- Class: Insecta
- Order: Plecoptera
- Family: Capniidae
- Genus: Paracapnia; Hanson, 1946

= Paracapnia =

Genus of stoneflies

Paracapnia is a genus of small winter stoneflies in the family Capniidae. There are at least five species described in the genus Paracapnia. They are native to North America.

== Species ==
- Paracapnia angulata Hanson, 1961 (angulate snowfly)
- Paracapnia disala (Jewett, 1962)
- Paracapnia ensicala (Jewett, 1962)
- Paracapnia opis (Newman, 1839) (northeastern snowfly); synonymous with Paracapnia curvata (Hanson, 1946)
- Paracapnia oswegaptera (Jewett, 1965)
