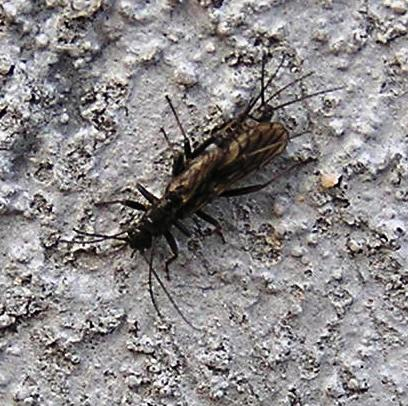
- Allocapnia granulata Pair in copulo. IN, Milltown, Blue River

Scientific classification
- Domain: Eukaryota
- Kingdom: Animalia
- Phylum: Arthropoda
- Class: Insecta
- Order: Plecoptera
- Family: Capniidae
- Genus: Allocapnia; Claassen, 1928

= Allocapnia =

Genus of stoneflies

Allocapnia is a genus of small winter stoneflies in the family Capniidae. There are at least 40 described species in Allocapnia.

== Species ==
- Allocapnia aurora Ricker, 1952
- Allocapnia brooksi Ross, 1964
- Allocapnia cunninghami Ross and Ricker, 1971
- Allocapnia curiosa Frison, 1942
- Allocapnia forbesi Frison, 1929
- Allocapnia frisoni Ross and Ricker, 1964
- Allocapnia frumi Kirchner, 1982
- Allocapnia fumosa Ross, 1964 (Smokies snowfly)
- Allocapnia granulata (Claassen, 1924)
- Allocapnia harperi Kirchner, 1980
- Allocapnia illinoensis Frison, 1935
- Allocapnia indianae Ricker, 1952
- Allocapnia jeanae Ross, 1964
- Allocapnia loshada Ricker, 1952
- Allocapnia malverna Ross, 1964
- Allocapnia maria Hanson, 1942 (two-knobbed snowfly)
- Allocapnia minima (Newport, 1848) (boreal snowfly)
- Allocapnia mohri Ross and Ricker, 1964
- Allocapnia mystica Frison, 1929
- Allocapnia nivicola (Fitch, 1847) (brook snowfly)
- Allocapnia ohioensis Ross and Ricker, 1964
- Allocapnia oribata Poulton and Stewart, 1987
- Allocapnia ozarkana Ross, 1964
- Allocapnia pechumani Ross and Ricker, 1964
- Allocapnia peltoides Ross and Ricker, 1964
- Allocapnia perplexa Ross and Ricker, 1971
- Allocapnia polemistis Ross and Ricker, 1971
- Allocapnia pygmaea (Burmeister, 1839) (pygmy snowfly)
- Allocapnia recta (Claassen, 1924) (eastern snowfly)
- Allocapnia rickeri Frison, 1942
- Allocapnia sandersoni Ricker, 1952
- Allocapnia sano Grubbs, 2006
- Allocapnia sequatchie Kondratieff and Kirchner, 2000
- Allocapnia simmonsi Kondratieff and Voshell, 1981
- Allocapnia smithi Ross and Ricker, 1971
- Allocapnia stannardi Ross, 1964
- Allocapnia starki Kondratieff and Kirchner, 2000
- Allocapnia tennessa Ross and Ricker, 1964
- Allocapnia tsalagi Grubbs, 2008
- Allocapnia unzickeri Ross and Yamamoto, 1966
- Allocapnia virginiana Frison, 1942
- Allocapnia vivipara (Claassen, 1924) (short-wing snowfly)
- Allocapnia warreni Ross and Yamamoto, 1966
- Allocapnia wrayi Ross, 1964
- Allocapnia zola Ricker, 1952
