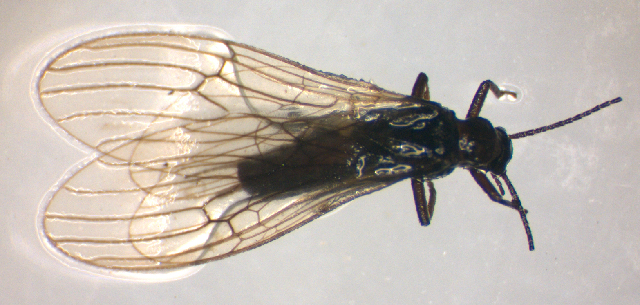
- Capnopsis schilleri

Scientific classification
- Domain: Eukaryota
- Kingdom: Animalia
- Phylum: Arthropoda
- Class: Insecta
- Order: Plecoptera
- Family: Capniidae
- Genus: Capnopsis; Morton, 1896

= Capnopsis =

Genus of stoneflies

Capnopsis is a genus of insects in the family Capniidae.

The genus was described in 1896 by Morton.

The species of this genus are found in Europe.

Species:

- Capnopsis schilleri (Rostrock, 1892)
