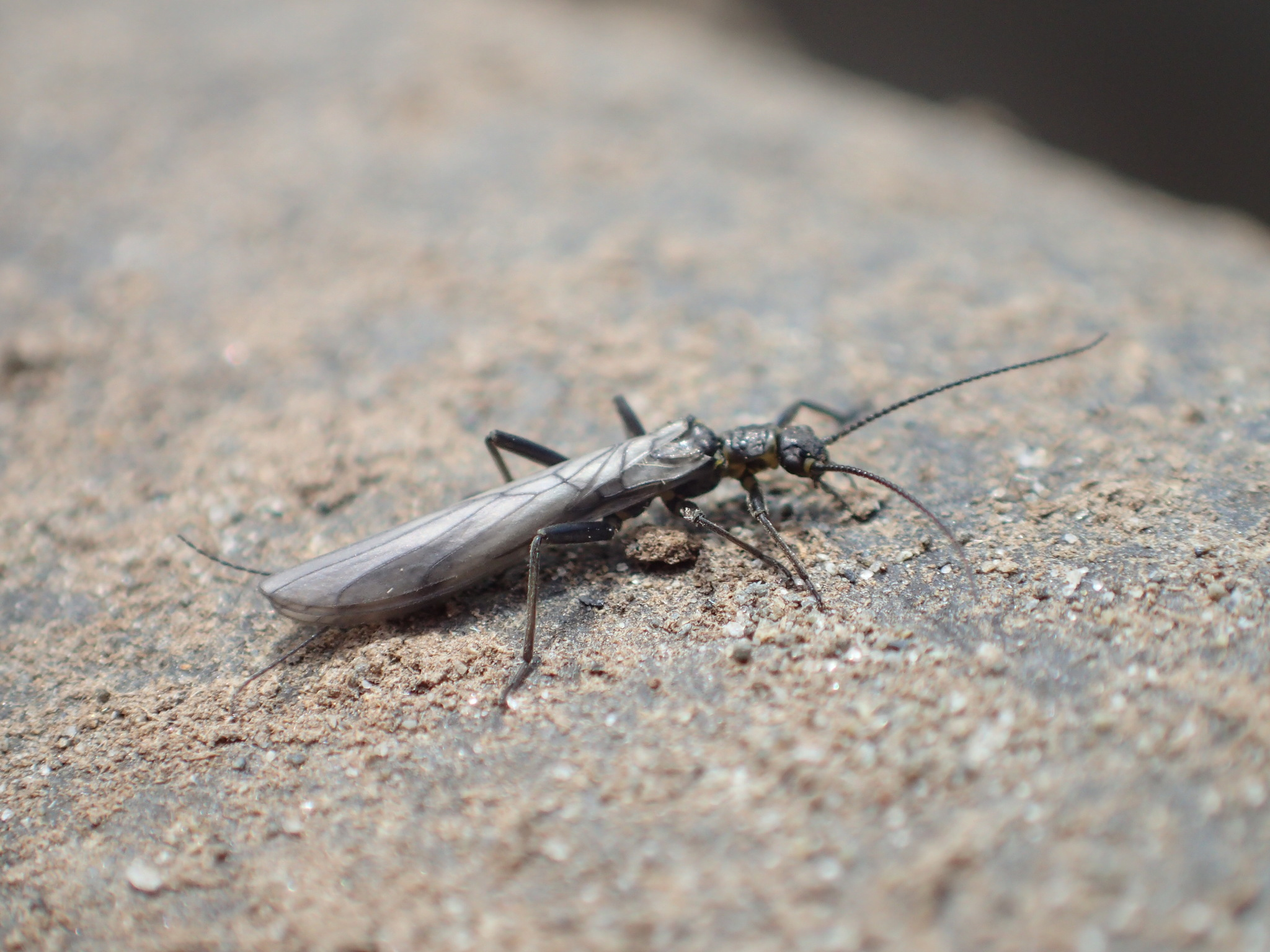
- Utacapnia columbiana (Capniidae)

Scientific classification
- Kingdom: Animalia
- Phylum: Arthropoda
- Class: Insecta
- Order: Plecoptera
- Suborder: Arctoperlaria

Synonyms
- Filipalpia

= Arctoperlaria =

Suborder of stoneflies

Arctoperlaria is a suborder of stoneflies, found globally. The Plecoptera Species File divides this suborder as follows:

== infraorder Euholognatha ==
unplaced family Scopuridae Uéno, 1935

- genus Scopura Uéno, 1929 (8 spp.: Korea, Japan)

=== Nemouroidea ===
superfamily authority: Billberg, 1820

1. †Baleyopterygidae Sinitshenkova, 1985
2. Capniidae Banks, 1900
3. Leuctridae Klapálek, 1905
4. †Mesoleuctridae Sinitshenkova, 1982
5. Nemouridae Billberg, 1820
6. Notonemouridae Ricker, 1950
7. †Palaeonemouridae Sinitshenkova, 1987
8. †Perlariopseidae Sinitshenkova, 1985
9. †Pronemouridae Liu, Sinitshenkova & Ren, 2011
10. Taeniopterygidae Klapálek, 1905

== infraorder Systellognatha ==
superfamily unplaced:
family †Petroperlidae

- genus †Sinosharaperla Liu, Sinitshenkova & Ren, 2007

=== Perloidea ===
superfamily authority: Latreille, 1802

1. Chloroperlidae Okamoto, 1912
2. Kathroperlidae Banks, 1947
3. †Palaeoperlidae Sharov, 1961
4. Perlidae Latreille, 1802
5. Perlodidae Klapálek, 1909
6. †Platyperlidae Sinitshenkova, 1982
7. †Tshekardoperlidae Sinitshenkova, 1987
- unplaced extinct genera

=== Pteronarcyoidea ===
superfamily authority: Newman, 1853

1. Peltoperlidae Claassen, 1931
2. Pteronarcyidae Newman, 1853
3. Styloperlidae Illies, 1966

== incertae sedis ==
family †Perspicuusoperlidae

- genus †Perspicuusoperla Chen, 2022
