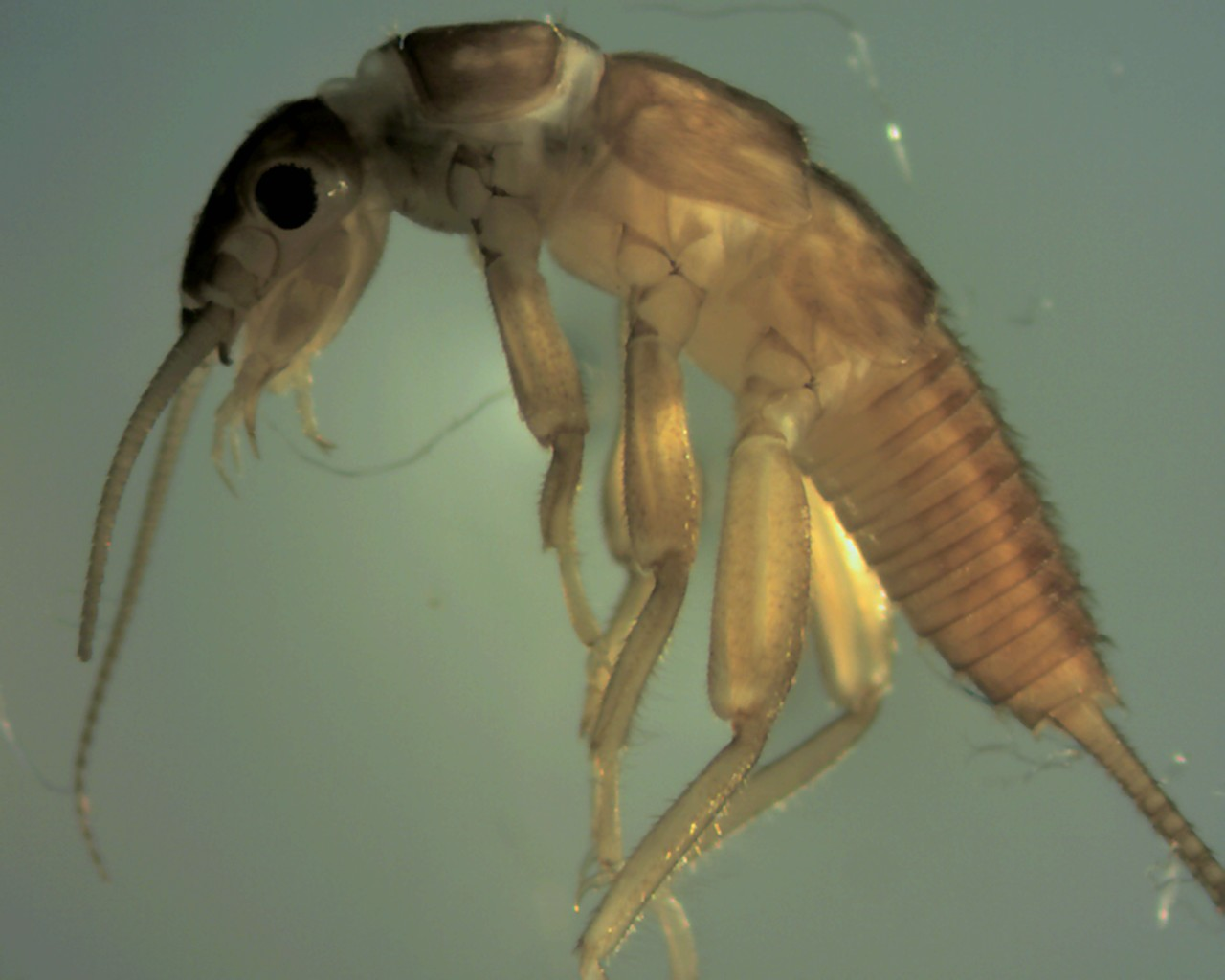

Scientific classification
- Domain: Eukaryota
- Kingdom: Animalia
- Phylum: Arthropoda
- Class: Insecta
- Order: Plecoptera
- Family: Capniidae
- Genus: Capnia; Pictet, 1841

Diversity
- at least 100 species

Synonyms
- Arsapnia Banks, 1897

= Capnia =

Genus of stoneflies

Capnia is a genus of small winter stoneflies in the family Capniidae. There are at least 120 described species in Capnia.

Capnia has generally been considered polyphyletic. Three new or resurrected genera have recently been created, partially or wholly, from some of its species: Arsapnia, Sierracapnia, and Zwicknia. In addition, seven Capnia species were previously included the genus Bolshecapnia when it was elevated from subgenus to genus, and three of those species were placed in the new genera Eurekapnia and Sasquacapnia in 2019.

== See also ==
- List of Capnia species
