= Capnura =

Scientific classification
- Domain: Eukaryota
- Kingdom: Animalia
- Phylum: Arthropoda
- Class: Insecta
- Order: Plecoptera
- Family: Capniidae
- Genus: Capnura; Banks, 1900

Genus of stoneflies

Capnura is a genus of small winter stoneflies in the family Capniidae. There are about seven described species in Capnura.

== Species ==
These seven species belong to the genus Capnura:

- Capnura anas Nelson & Baumann, 1987
- Capnura elevata (Frison, 1942)
- Capnura fibula (Claassen, 1924)
- Capnura intermontana Nelson & Baumann, 1987
- Capnura manitoba (Claassen, 1924) (Manitoba snowfly)
- Capnura venosa Banks, 1900
- Capnura wanica (Frison, 1944)
