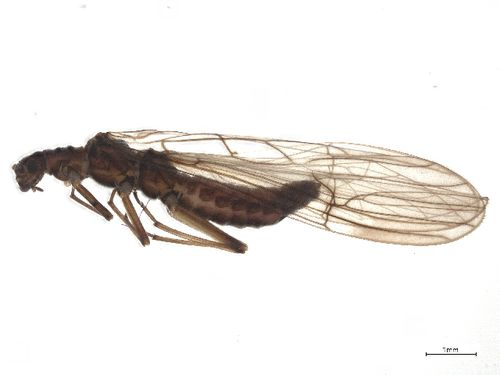

Scientific classification
- Kingdom: Animalia
- Phylum: Arthropoda
- Clade: Pancrustacea
- Class: Insecta
- Order: Plecoptera
- Family: Capniidae
- Genus: Capnioneura; Ris, 1905

Species
- See list.

Synonyms
- Napcia Navás, 1917

= Capnioneura =

Genus of stonefly

Capnioneura is a genus of small winter stoneflies in the family Capniidae, containing 15 species. The genus was formally described in 1905 by Swiss entomologist Friedrich Ris. Capnioneura are found in various nations in Europe, as well as Turkey. The genus has one synonym, being Napcia, coined in 1917 by Spanish entomologist Longinos Navás.

== List of species ==
The following 15 species are accepted as part of the genus Capnioneura:

- Capnioneura aptera Berthélemy, 1969
- Capnioneura atlasica Vinçon, El Alami & Errochdi, 2014
- Capnioneura balkanica Baumann & Kaćanski, 1975
- Capnioneura bolkari Vinçon & Sivec, 2011
- Capnioneura brachyptera Despax, 1932
- Capnioneura caucasica Zhiltzova, 1964
- Capnioneura gelesae Berthélemy & Baena-Ruiz, 1984
- Capnioneura gouanerae Vinçon & Sivec, 2011
- Capnioneura libera (Navás, 1909)
- Capnioneura mitis Despax, 1932
- Capnioneura narcea Vinçon & Sánchez-Ortega, 2002
- Capnioneura nemuroides Ris, 1905
- Capnioneura petitpierreae Aubert, 1960
- Capnioneura petricola Giudicelli, 1967
- Capnioneura valandovi Ikonomov, 1978
