= Sierraperla =

Scientific classification
- Domain: Eukaryota
- Kingdom: Animalia
- Phylum: Arthropoda
- Class: Insecta
- Order: Plecoptera
- Family: Peltoperlidae
- Genus: Sierraperla; Jewett, 1954

Genus of stoneflies

Sierraperla is a genus of roach-like stoneflies in the family Peltoperlidae. There are at least two described species in Sierraperla.

== Species ==
These two species belong to the genus Sierraperla:

- Sierraperla cora (Needham & Smith, 1916) (giant roachfly)
- Sierraperla tolowa Stark & Kondratieff, 2015
