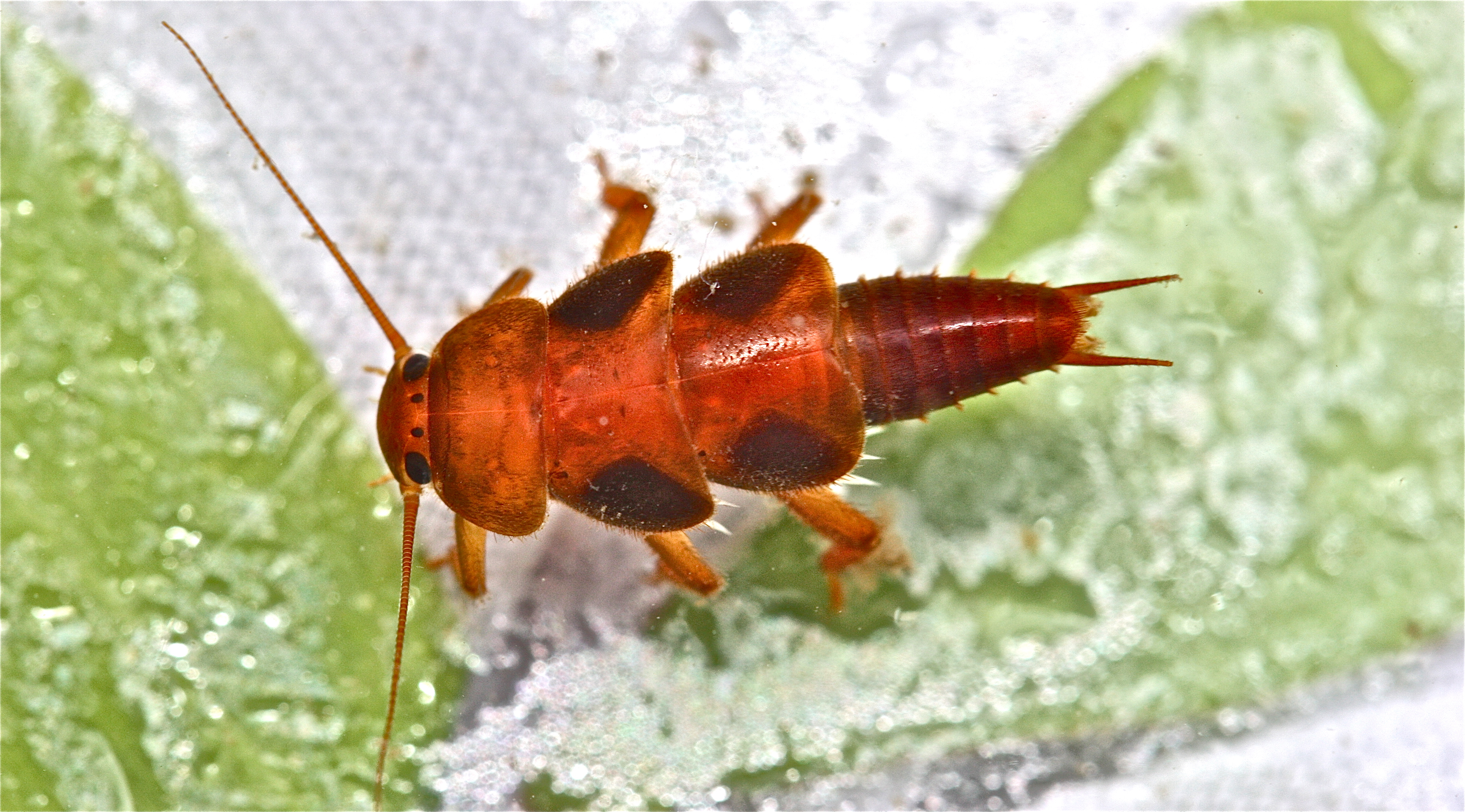
- Tallaperla sp.

Scientific classification
- Domain: Eukaryota
- Kingdom: Animalia
- Phylum: Arthropoda
- Class: Insecta
- Order: Plecoptera
- Family: Peltoperlidae
- Genus: Tallaperla; Stark & Stewart, 1981

= Tallaperla =

Genus of stoneflies

Tallaperla is a genus of roach-like stoneflies in the family Peltoperlidae. There are about seven described species in Tallaperla.

== Species ==
These seven species belong to the genus Tallaperla:

- Tallaperla anna (Needham & Smith, 1916)
- Tallaperla cornelia (Needham & Smith, 1916)
- Tallaperla elisa Stark, 1983
- Tallaperla laurie (Ricker, 1952)
- Tallaperla lobata Stark, 1983
- Tallaperla maiyae Kondratieff, Kirchner & Zuellig, 2007
- Tallaperla maria (Needham & Smith, 1916) (common roachfly)
