= Styloperlidae =

- Styloperla sp.

Scientific classification
- Kingdom: Animalia
- Phylum: Arthropoda
- Clade: Pancrustacea
- Class: Insecta
- Cohort: Polyneoptera
- Order: Plecoptera
- Superfamily: Pteronarcyoidea
- Family: Styloperlidae; Illies, 1966

Family of stoneflies

Styloperlidae is a family of stoneflies in the order Plecoptera. There are at least 2 genera and 9 described species in Styloperlidae. The species etymology is based on the type of locality near Sapa.

== History ==
The Styloperlidae family was originally proposed as a subfamily of the Peltoperlidae (Illies 1966), but later given family status (Uchida & Isobe 1989). Several species have little information associated with them, and most descriptions are based on relatively few specimens. Several types of Chinese species have also been lost.

== Habitat ==
There are three known Cerconychia species (Klapálek, 1913) and six Styloperla Wu species known from Taiwan, Hainan, and the mainland (Vietnam) (Uchida & Isobe 1989; Yang & Yang 1990, 1995).

The Cerconychia brunnea (Klapálek) and C. livida (Klapálek) are known from Taiwan (Uchida & Isobe, 1989), the C. sinensis (Yang & Yang) are known from Hainan (Yang & Yang, 1995), and the C. sapa are known from the mainland in Vietnam.

== Description ==
=== Egg ===
The eggs are ovoid, with the collar absent, and the chorion smooth. This is typical for the Styloperlidae genus.

=== Nymph ===
The Nymph is currently unknown.

=== Adult ===
The adult males have numerous small spines scattered over the dorsum and margin of the basal cercal segment. This feature makes the males distinct from all other known Styloperlidae. The adult females have a slightly produced, emarginate subgenital plate similar to other known Cerconychia (Uchida & Isobe 1989). The forewing length measures 16.5‐18mm, making it greater than the 9‐16mm composite range given for the Taiwanese species.

== Genera ==
These two genera belong to the family Styloperlidae:

- Cerconychia Klapálek, 1913
- Styloperla Wu, 1935
