= Yoraperla =

Scientific classification
- Domain: Eukaryota
- Kingdom: Animalia
- Phylum: Arthropoda
- Class: Insecta
- Order: Plecoptera
- Family: Peltoperlidae
- Genus: Yoraperla; Ricker, 1952

Genus of stoneflies

Yoraperla is a genus of roach-like stoneflies in the family Peltoperlidae. There are about eight described species in Yoraperla.

== Species ==
These eight species belong to the genus Yoraperla:

- Yoraperla altaica Devyatkov, 2003
- Yoraperla brevis (Banks, 1907)
- Yoraperla han Stark & Nelson, 1994
- Yoraperla mariana (Ricker, 1943) (brown roachfly)
- Yoraperla nigrisoma (Banks, 1948) (black roachfly)
- Yoraperla siletz Stark & Nelson, 1994
- Yoraperla uchidai Stark & Nelson, 1994
- Yoraperla uenoi (Kohno, 1946)
