= Eucapnopsis =

Scientific classification
- Domain: Eukaryota
- Kingdom: Animalia
- Phylum: Arthropoda
- Class: Insecta
- Order: Plecoptera
- Family: Capniidae
- Genus: Eucapnopsis; Okamoto, 1922

Genus of stoneflies

Eucapnopsis is a genus of small winter stoneflies in the family Capniidae. There are at least 2 described species in Eucapnopsis.

== Species ==
- Eucapnopsis brevicauda Claassen, 1924 (short-tailed snowfly)
- Eucapnopsis stigmatica Okamoto, 1922
