= Arsapnia =

Scientific classification
- Domain: Eukaryota
- Kingdom: Animalia
- Phylum: Arthropoda
- Class: Insecta
- Order: Plecoptera
- Family: Capniidae
- Genus: Arsapnia; Banks, 1897

Genus of stoneflies

Arsapnia is a genus of small winter stoneflies in the family Capniidae. There are about eight described species in Arsapnia.

The genus Arsapnia was originally described in 1897, but was considered a synonym of Capnia. Arsapnia was re-established in 2014 by Murányi, et al., for eight species of Capnia.

== Species ==
These eight species, formerly members of Capnia, now belong to the genus Arsapnia:

- Arsapnia arapahoe (Nelson & Kondratieff, 1988)
- Arsapnia coyote (Nelson & Baumann, 1987)
- Arsapnia decepta Banks, 1897
- Arsapnia pileata (Jewett, 1966)
- Arsapnia sequoia (Nelson & Baumann, 1987)
- Arsapnia teresa (Claassen, 1924)
- Arsapnia tumida (Claassen, 1924)
- Arsapnia utahensis (Gaufin & Jewett, 1962)
