= Pronemouridae =

Pronemouridae Temporal range: Callovian–Aptian

Scientific classification
- Domain: Eukaryota
- Kingdom: Animalia
- Phylum: Arthropoda
- Class: Insecta
- Order: Plecoptera
- Superfamily: Nemouroidea
- Family: †Pronemouridae; Liu, Sinitshenkova & Ren, 2011

Extinct family of stoneflies

Pronemouridae is an extinct family of stoneflies in the order Plecoptera. There are at least three genera and about eight described species in Pronemouridae.

== Genera ==
These three genera belong to the family Pronemouridae:

- † Dimoula Sinitshenkova, 2005
- † Nemourisca Sinitshenkova, 1987
- † Pronemoura Liu, Sinitshenkova & Ren, 2011
