= Notonemouridae =

Notonemouridae Temporal range: Middle Jurassic–Recent
- Imago (adult) of Spaniocerca longicauda, a notonemourid
- A nymph of Notonemouridae

Scientific classification
- Kingdom: Animalia
- Phylum: Arthropoda
- Clade: Pancrustacea
- Class: Insecta
- Cohort: Polyneoptera
- Order: Plecoptera
- Superfamily: Nemouroidea
- Family: Notonemouridae; Ricker, 1950

Family of stoneflies

Notonemouridae is a family of stoneflies in the order Plecoptera. There are more than 20 genera and at least 120 described species in Notonemouridae.

== Genera ==
These 23 genera belong to the family Notonemouridae:

- Afronemoura Illies, 1981
- Aphanicerca Tillyard, 1931
- Aphanicercella Tillyard, 1931
- Aphanicercopsis Barnard, 1934
- Austrocerca Illies, 1975
- Austrocercella Illies, 1975
- Austrocercoides Illies, 1975
- Austronemoura Aubert, 1960
- Balinskycercella Stevens & Picker, 1995
- Cristaperla McLellan, 1972
- Desmonemoura Tillyard, 1931
- Kimminsoperla Illies, 1961
- Madenemura Paulian, 1949
- Neofulla Claassen, 1936
- Neonemura Navás, 1919
- Notonemoura Tillyard, 1923
- Omanuperla McLellan, 1972
- Otehiwi McLellan, 2003
- Spaniocerca Tillyard, 1923
- Spaniocercoides Kimmins, 1938
- Tasmanocerca Illies, 1975
- Udamocercia Enderlein, 1909
- Halticoperla McLellan & Winterbourn, 1968

=== Extinct genera ===
- †Paranotonemoura Cui and Béthoux 2018 Togo-Khuduk Formation, Mongolia, Middle Jurassic (Bajocian/Bathonian), Daohugou, China, Middle/Late Jurassic
- †Talbragaria Sroka & Prokop, 2023 Talbragar Beds, Australia, Late Jurassic
