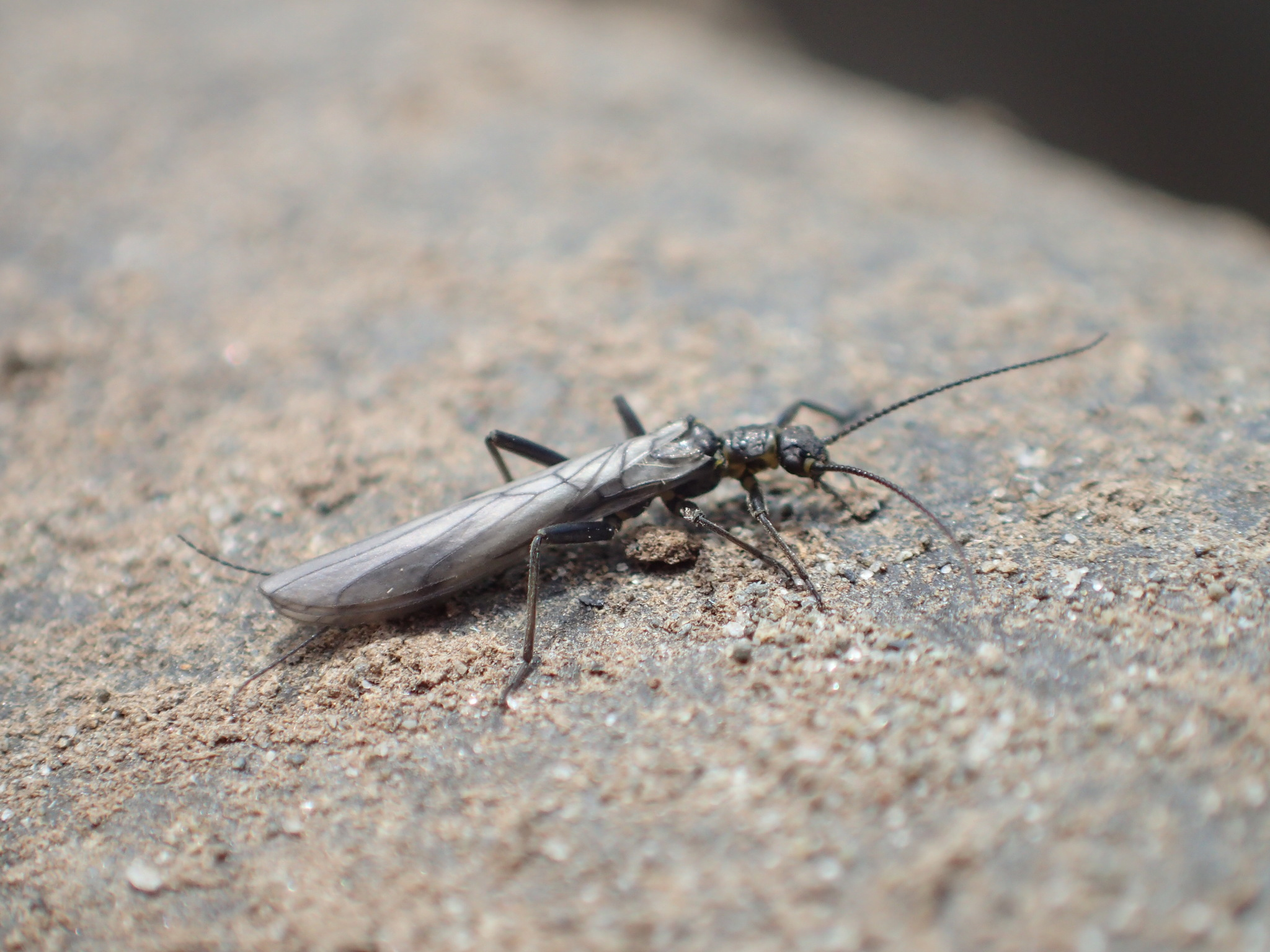
- Utacapnia columbiana

Scientific classification
- Domain: Eukaryota
- Kingdom: Animalia
- Phylum: Arthropoda
- Class: Insecta
- Order: Plecoptera
- Family: Capniidae
- Genus: Utacapnia; Gaufin, 1970

= Utacapnia =

Genus of stoneflies

Utacapnia is a genus of small winter stoneflies in the family Capniidae. There are about 11 described species in Utacapnia, found primarily in the Rocky Mountains of North America. Most species in this genus were first described by Alan V. Nebeker and Arden R. Gaufin.

== Species ==
These 11 species belong to the genus Utacapnia:

- Utacapnia columbiana (Claassen, 1924)^{i c g}
- Utacapnia distincta (Frison, 1937)^{i c g}
- Utacapnia imbera (Nebeker and Gaufin, 1965)^{i c g}
- Utacapnia labradora (Ricker, 1954)^{i c g}
- Utacapnia lemoniana (Nebeker and Gaufin, 1965)^{i c g}
- Utacapnia logana (Nebeker and Gaufin, 1965)^{i c g}
- Utacapnia nedia (Nebeker & Gaufin, 1966)^{c g}
- Utacapnia poda (Nebeker and Gaufin, 1965)^{i c g}
- Utacapnia sierra (Nebeker and Gaufin, 1965)^{i c g}
- Utacapnia tahoensis (Nebeker and Gaufin, 1965)^{i c g}
- Utacapnia trava (Nebeker & Gaufin, 1965)^{i c g b} (Yellowstone snowfly)

Data sources: i = ITIS, c = Catalogue of Life, g = GBIF, b = Bugguide.net
