= Capnia lacustra =

Lake Tahoe benthic stonefly

Conservation status
- Critically Imperiled (NatureServe)

Scientific classification
- Kingdom: Animalia
- Phylum: Arthropoda
- Clade: Pancrustacea
- Class: Insecta
- Order: Plecoptera
- Family: Capniidae
- Genus: Capnia
- Species: C. lacustra

Binomial name
- Capnia lacustra Jewett, 1965

Species of insect

Capnia lacustra, also known as the Lake Tahoe benthic stonefly or lake snowfly, is a species of insect in the family Capniidae. It was first described by S.G. Jewett in 1965 and is the only stonefly known to spend its entire adult life underwater.

== Description ==
Capnia lacustra is a yellow-ish stonefly up to 5.5 mm long that lacks both wings and external gills. It has long, filamentous antennae, paired abdominal cerci, and large compound eyes.

== Natural history ==
=== Life cycle and behavior ===
Unlike other stoneflies, Capnia lacustra adults do not leave the water to lay eggs. They have a univoltine life cycle and have been shown to exhibit facultative viviparity. Researchers have observed two distinct cohorts of Capnia lacustra: one with viviparous females that develop eggs in the fall and one with oviparous females that develop eggs in the spring. Genetic testing has shown that neither cohort is its own distinct species. In viviparous individuals, eggs have been observed in many parts of the body, including the head.

=== Habitat and distribution ===
Capnia lacustra is endemic to Lake Tahoe, which spans the border of Nevada and California. Specimens have been collected in both states at depths of 200–899 feet (61–274 metres) but are most commonly found in plant beds up to 350 feet below the lake's surface.

=== Conservation status ===
Since the 1960s, Capnia lacustra density has decreased at multiple known sites. This could be related to declines in algae in the genus Chara, which makes up a significant part of their habitat.
