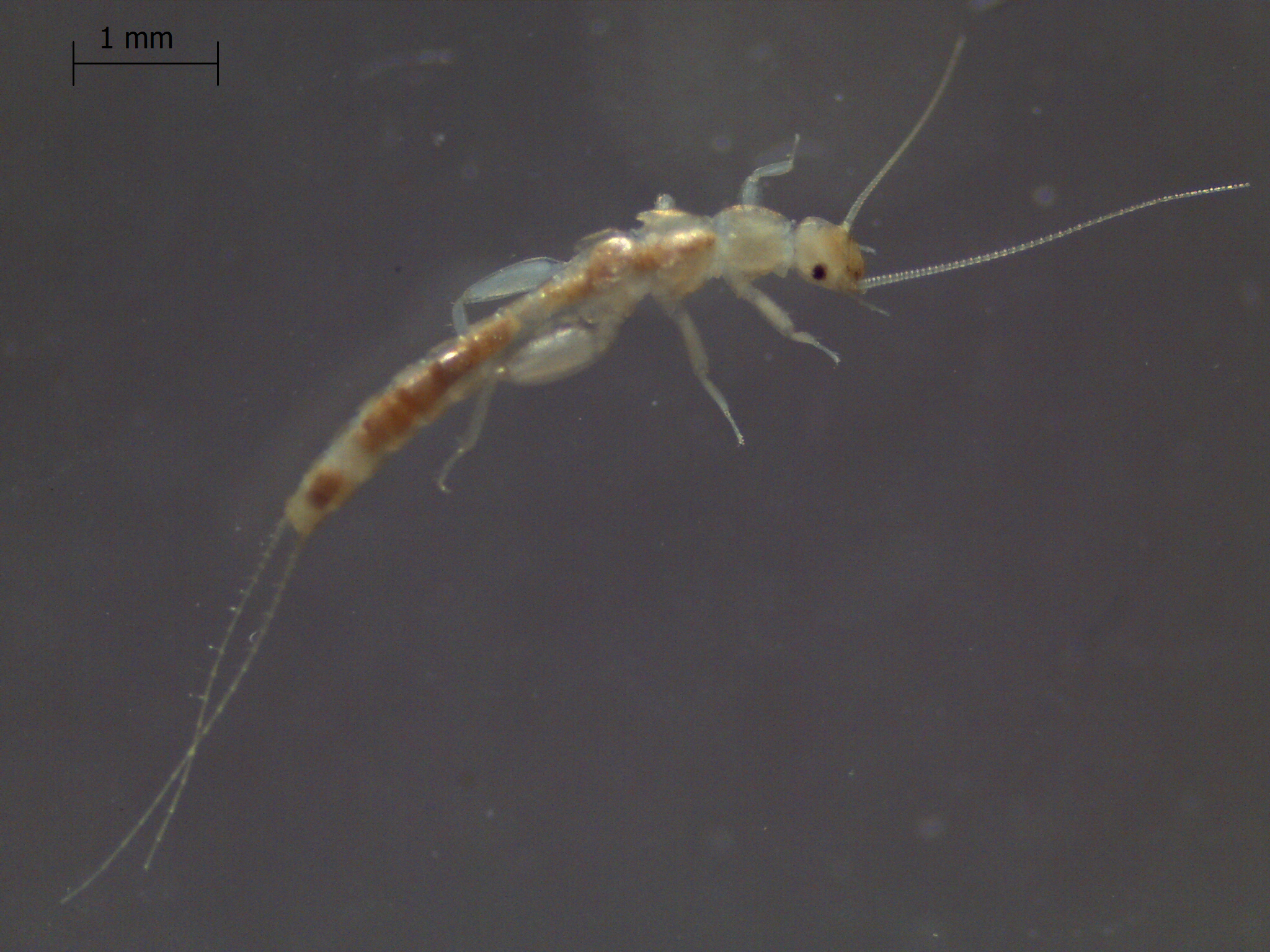
- Zwicknia bifrons

Scientific classification
- Domain: Eukaryota
- Kingdom: Animalia
- Phylum: Arthropoda
- Class: Insecta
- Order: Plecoptera
- Family: Capniidae
- Genus: Zwicknia; Murányi, 2014

= Zwicknia =

Genus of stoneflies

Zwicknia is a genus of small winter stoneflies in the family Capniidae. There are about 11 described species in Zwicknia.

== Species ==
These 11 species belong to the genus Zwicknia:

- Zwicknia acuta Murányi & Orci, 2014
- Zwicknia bifrons (Newman, 1838)
- Zwicknia gattolliati Vinçon & Reding, 2018
- Zwicknia komica Murányi & Boumans, 2014
- Zwicknia kovacsi Murányi & Gamboa, 2014
- Zwicknia ledoarei Reding, Launay, Ruffoni, Vinçon & Boumans, 2016
- Zwicknia rupprechti Murányi, Orci & Gamboa, 2014
- Zwicknia sevanica (Zhiltzova, 1964)
- Zwicknia tuberculata (Zhiltzova, 1964)
- Zwicknia turkestanica (Kimmins, 1950)
- Zwicknia westermanni Boumans & Murányi, 2014
