= Sierracapnia =

Scientific classification
- Domain: Eukaryota
- Kingdom: Animalia
- Phylum: Arthropoda
- Class: Insecta
- Order: Plecoptera
- Family: Capniidae
- Genus: Sierracapnia; Bottorff & Baumann, 2015

Genus of stoneflies

Sierracapnia is a genus of small winter stoneflies in the family Capniidae. There are about seven described species in Sierracapnia.

== Species ==
These seven species belong to the genus Sierracapnia:

- Sierracapnia barberi (Claassen, 1924)
- Sierracapnia hornigi (Baumann & Sheldon, 1984)
- Sierracapnia mono (Nelson & Baumann, 1987)
- Sierracapnia palomar (Nelson & Baumann, 1987)
- Sierracapnia shepardi (Nelson & Baumann, 1987)
- Sierracapnia washoe Bottorff & Baumann, 2015
- Sierracapnia yosemite (Nelson & Baumann, 1987)
