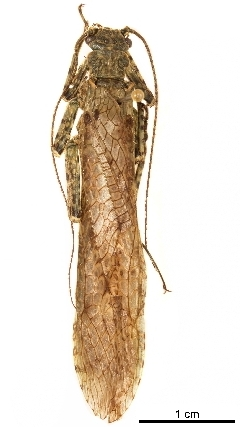
- Diamphipnopsis virescentipennis

Scientific classification
- Kingdom: Animalia
- Phylum: Arthropoda
- Class: Insecta
- Order: Plecoptera
- Suborder: Antarctoperlaria
- Superfamily: Eusthenioidea
- Family: Diamphipnoidae; Ricker, 1950

= Diamphipnoidae =

Family of stoneflies

Diamphipnoidae is a family of stoneflies in the order Plecoptera. There are at least two genera and about nine described species in Diamphipnoidae. They are only found in Chile and Argentina, and possibly Paraguay and Uruguay.

== Taxonomy ==
There are nine species in two genera belong to the family Diamphipnoidae:

- Diamphipnoa Gerstaecker, 1873
  - D. annulata (Brauer, 1869)
  - D. caicaivilu Vera, 2017
  - D. chillanensis Murányi, Gamboa, & Vera
  - D. colberti Stark, 2008
  - D. fresiae Vera, 2018
  - D. helgae Illies, 1960
- Diamphipnopsis Illies, 1960
  - D. beschi Illies, 1960
  - D. oncolensis Vera, 2018
  - D. virescentipennis (Blanchard, 1851)
