= Eurekapnia =

Scientific classification
- Domain: Eukaryota
- Kingdom: Animalia
- Phylum: Arthropoda
- Class: Insecta
- Order: Plecoptera
- Family: Capniidae
- Genus: Eurekapnia; Stark & Broome, 2019
- Species: E. maculata

Binomial name
- Eurekapnia maculata (Jewett, 1954)

Genus of stoneflies

Eurekapnia is a genus of small winter stoneflies in the family Capniidae. There is one described species in Eurekapnia, E. maculata.
