= Sasquacapnia =

Scientific classification
- Domain: Eukaryota
- Kingdom: Animalia
- Phylum: Arthropoda
- Class: Insecta
- Order: Plecoptera
- Family: Capniidae
- Genus: Sasquacapnia; Baumann & Broome, 2019

Genus of stoneflies

Sasquacapnia is a genus of small winter stoneflies in the family Capniidae. There are at least two described species in Sasquacapnia.

== Species ==
These two species belong to the genus Sasquacapnia:

- Sasquacapnia missiona (Baumann & Potter, 2007)
- Sasquacapnia sasquatchi (Ricker, 1965)
