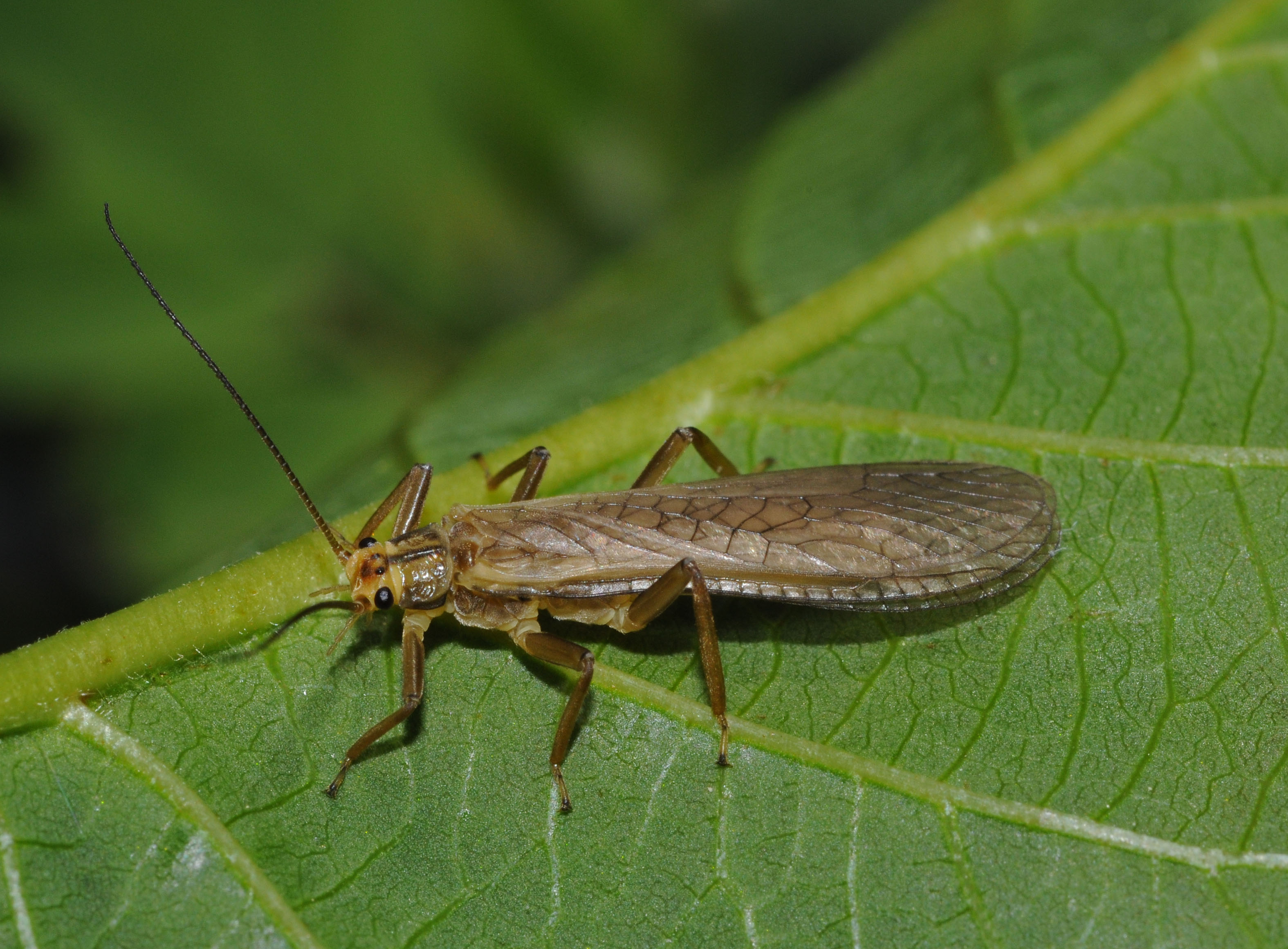
- Soliperla sierra

Scientific classification
- Kingdom: Animalia
- Phylum: Arthropoda
- Clade: Pancrustacea
- Class: Insecta
- Order: Plecoptera
- Superfamily: Pteronarcyoidea
- Family: Peltoperlidae; Claassen, 1931

= Peltoperlidae =

Family of stoneflies

The Peltoperlidae, also known as roach-like stoneflies or roachflies, are a family of stoneflies.

The family Peltoperlidae comprises 11 genera and 46 known species. Species are semivoltine, meaning their lifecycles last one to two years. Adults of the family usually emerge in late spring or early summer, April through June. Larvae are flattened and brown in color, and they are roach-like in appearance because of the expanded thoracic plates covering the bases of their legs, heads, and abdomens. Tapering gills occur on the thorax at the bases of the legs. These tracheal gills are multifunctional and key to many biological processes. No dense tufts or branching gills are found on their thoraces or abdomens, unlike other Plecoptera families. The larvae also possess broad, chisel-like mandibles. Adults have two ocelli in addition to their two compound eyes. Male epiprocts are sclerotized and rod-like in shape, and both sexes lack cross-veins in the anal lobe of the forewings.

Peltoperlidae are generally lotic erosional and depositional. These habitats are flowing streams marked by sediments, vascular plants, and detritus. Roach-like stoneflies are generally found in leaf litter and debris piles trapped in either riffles or pools.

This family is considered to be clingers-sprawlers; they attach to surface in erosional habitats or rest loosely on the top surfaces of substrates, respectively. The body of this stonefly is flattened and streamlined to aid in minimizing water resistance in a flowing stream.

The Peltoperlidae are classified as in the feeding group shredders-detritivores. They chew and mine through leaf litter in their habitats. They are a significant contributor to leaf breakdown in streams. This family is very sensitive to disturbances in environmental conditions. They are intolerant to loss of coarse particulate organic matter for food and habitat. Given this low tolerance, Peltoperlids make potential bioindicators.

== Genera ==
These 10 genera belong to the family Peltoperlidae:

- Cryptoperla Needham, 1909
- Microperla Chu, 1928
- Peltoperla Needham, 1905
- Peltoperlopsis Illies, 1966
- Peltopteryx Stark, 1989
- Sierraperla Jewett, 1954
- Soliperla Ricker, 1952
- Tallaperla Stark & Stewart, 1981
- Viehoperla Ricker, 1952
- Yoraperla Ricker, 1952
