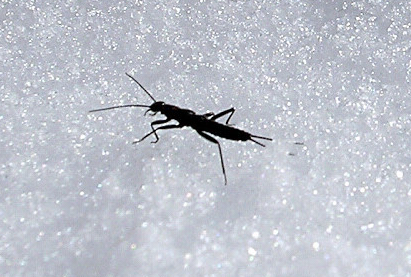
- Eocapnia nivalis on the snow in Nagano (Japan)

Scientific classification
- Kingdom: Animalia
- Phylum: Arthropoda
- Clade: Pancrustacea
- Class: Insecta
- Cohort: Polyneoptera
- Order: Plecoptera
- Superfamily: Nemouroidea
- Family: Capniidae; Banks, 1900

= Capniidae =

Small winter stoneflies Temporal range: Early Jurassic–Recent

Family of stoneflies

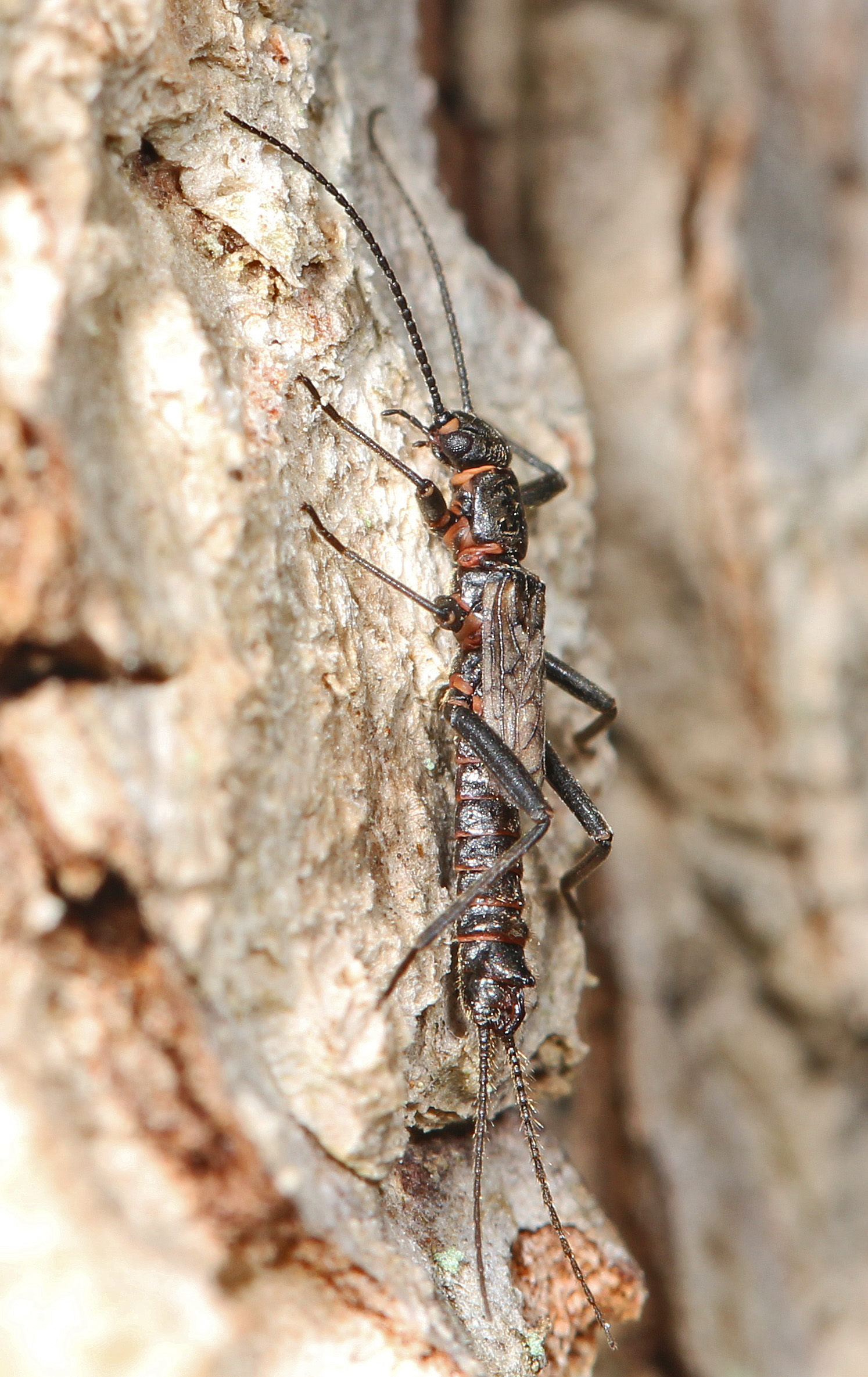
Allocapnia, Great Falls, Virginia

The Capniidae, the small winter stoneflies, are a family of insects in the stonefly order (Plecoptera). It constitutes one of the largest stonefly families, containing some 300 species distributed throughout the holarctic. Their closest relatives are the rolled-winged stoneflies (Leuctridae).

Many species are endemic to small ranges, perhaps due to the family's tendency to evolve tolerance for cold (isolating populations in mountain valleys) and winglessness (inhibiting dispersal). Indeed, some wingless Capniidae – e.g. the Lake Tahoe benthic stonefly ("Capnia" lacustra, Capnia is not monophyletic and this species is suspected to belong elsewhere) or Baikaloperla spp. – spend their entire lifecycles under water and do not disperse from their native lakes at all.

== Description and ecology ==
Adult Capniidae, as their common name implies, are typically small Plecoptera; while most are less than 1 cm long with some measuring just 4 mm as adults, a few are as large as 25 mm (1 in) at adulthood. The adults emerge from the water in winter and are often found walking around on the snow. Characteristic are the wings with at most one cubital crossvein, and the paraprocts (anal lobes), the inner lobes of which form a tube closed on the underside by the outer lobes.

Nymphs of small winter stoneflies typically have very elongated and slender bodies, similar to those of Leuctridae. However, the groove along the abdomen, from segment 1 to 9, is generally very pronounced.

The nymphs dwell in the hyporheic zone, the interface between stream water and groundwater. Only immediately before moulting into the adult form will the nymphs move out of the substrate and appear on the stream bed. Thus, although they may be plentiful in clean rivers and streams, they are seldom encountered in standard samples of benthos.

== Systematics and taxonomy ==
The family Capniidae is often considered to be monotypic as to subfamily, with the Capniinae being inserted at that rank. However, this is rather pointless; in any case, the phylogeny, systematics, and taxonomy of the small winter stoneflies are highly confused. There appear to be two very basal genera and presumably two larger clades which conceivably could be considered subfamilies, but the phylogeny of the Capniidae is by no means robustly resolved, with about one-third of the named genera of uncertain position. Hence, any subdivision beyond the generic level is premature.

The type genus Capnia has generally been considered polyphyletic. Three new or resurrected genera have recently been created, partially or wholly, from some of its species: Arsapnia, Sierracapnia, and Zwicknia. In addition, seven Capnia species were previously included the genus Bolshecapnia when it was elevated from subgenus to genus, and three of those species were placed in the new genera Eurekapnia and Sasquacapnia in 2019.

== Genera ==
These genera belong to the family Capniidae:

- Allocapnia Claassen, 1928
- Apteroperla Matsumura, 1931
- Arsapnia Banks, 1897
- Baikaloperla Zapekina-Dulkeit & Zhiltzova, 1973
- Bolshecapnia Ricker, 1965
- Capnia Pictet, 1841
- Capniella Klapálek, 1920
- Capnioneura Ris, 1905
- Capnopsis Morton, 1896
- Capnura Banks, 1900
- Eocapnia Kawai, 1955
- Eucapnopsis Okamoto, 1922
- Eurekapnia Stark & Broome, 2019
- Isocapnia Banks, 1938
- Mesocapnia Raušer, 1968
- Nemocapnia Banks, 1938
- Paracapnia Hanson, 1946
- Sasquacapnia Baumann & Broome, 2019
- Sierracapnia Bottorff & Baumann, 2015
- Sinocapnia Murányi, Li & Yang, 2015
- Takagripopteryx Okamoto, 1922
- Utacapnia Gaufin, 1970
- Zwicknia Murányi, 2014

=== Extinct genera ===
- †Dobbertiniopteryx Ansorge, 1993 oooo Green Series, Germany, Early Jurassic (Toarcian), Daohugou, China, Middle/Late Jurassic
- †Rovnocapnia Sinitshenkova 2009 Rovno amber, Ukraine, Eocene
