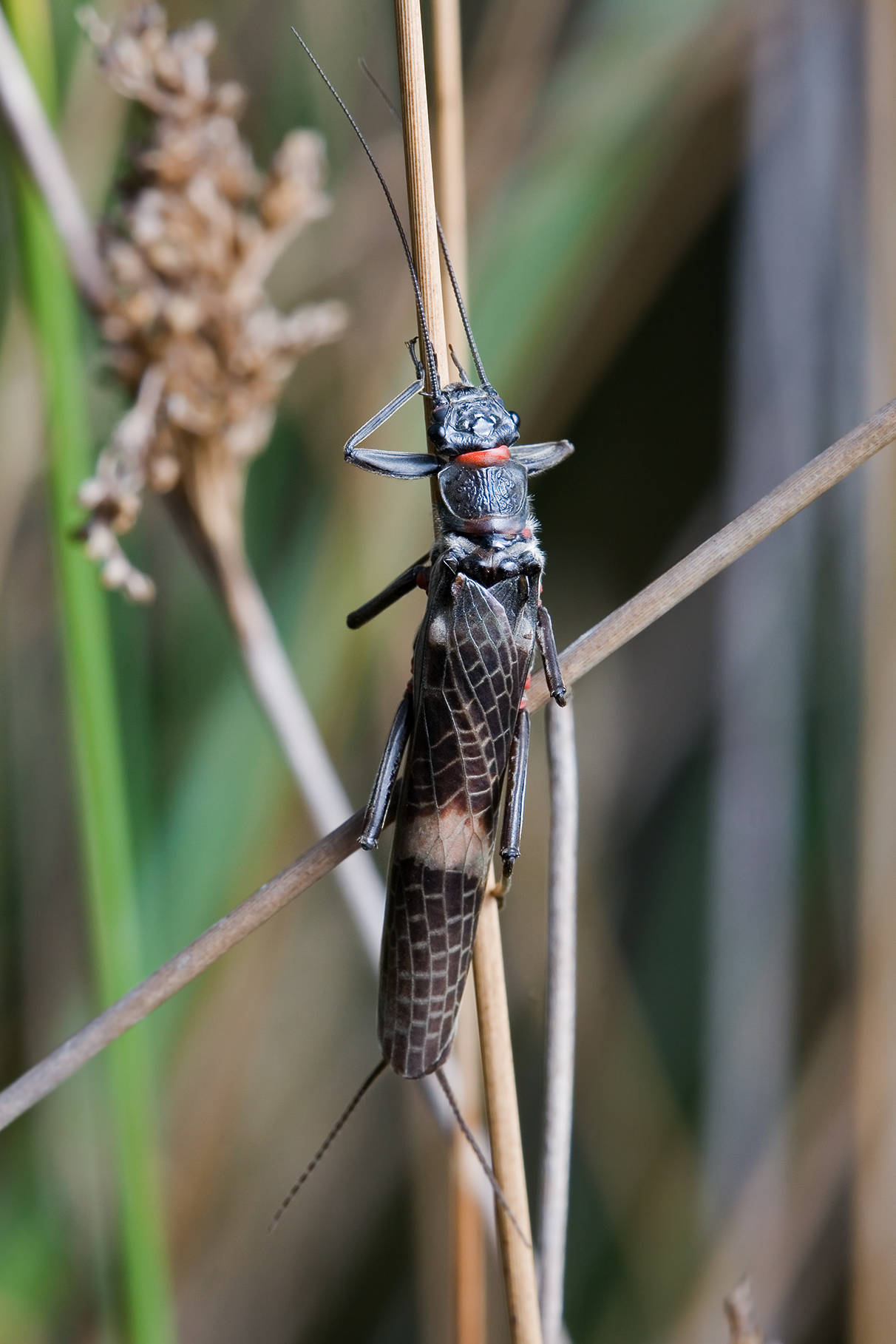
- Eusthenia sp.

Scientific classification
- Kingdom: Animalia
- Phylum: Arthropoda
- Clade: Pancrustacea
- Class: Insecta
- Clade: Dicondylia
- Subclass: Pterygota
- Infraclass: Neoptera
- Cohort: Polyneoptera
- Order: Plecoptera; Burmeister, 1839

Suborders & infraorders
- Suborder Arctoperlaria; Suborder Antarctoperlaria; Infraorder Euholognatha; Infraorder Systellognatha

= Plecoptera =

Plecoptera Temporal range: 310–0 Ma Pennsylvanian–Recent

Order of insects

Plecoptera is an order of insects commonly known as stoneflies. Some 3,500 species are described worldwide, with new species still being discovered. Stoneflies are found worldwide, except Antarctica. Stoneflies are believed to be one of the most primitive groups of Neoptera, with close relatives identified from the Carboniferous and Lower Permian geological periods, while true stoneflies are known from fossils only a bit younger. Their modern diversity, however, apparently is of Mesozoic origin.

Plecoptera are found in both the Southern and Northern Hemispheres, and the populations are quite distinct, although the evolutionary evidence suggests species may have crossed the equator on a number of occasions before once again becoming geographically isolated.

All species of Plecoptera are intolerant of water pollution, and the presence of their nymphs in a stream or still water is usually an indicator of good or excellent water quality.

== Description and ecology ==
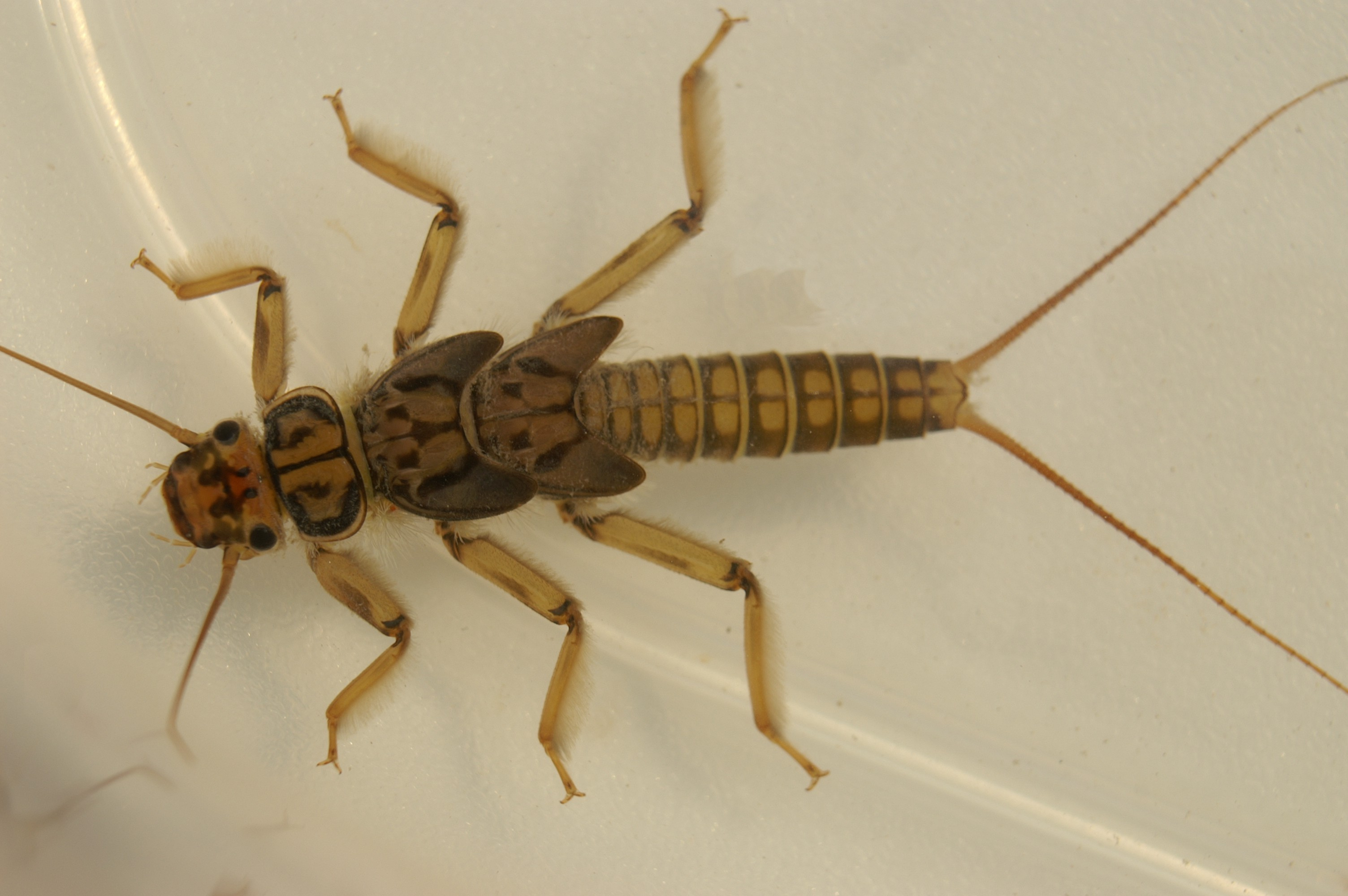
Nymph of a golden stonefly, Plecoptera, Perlidae

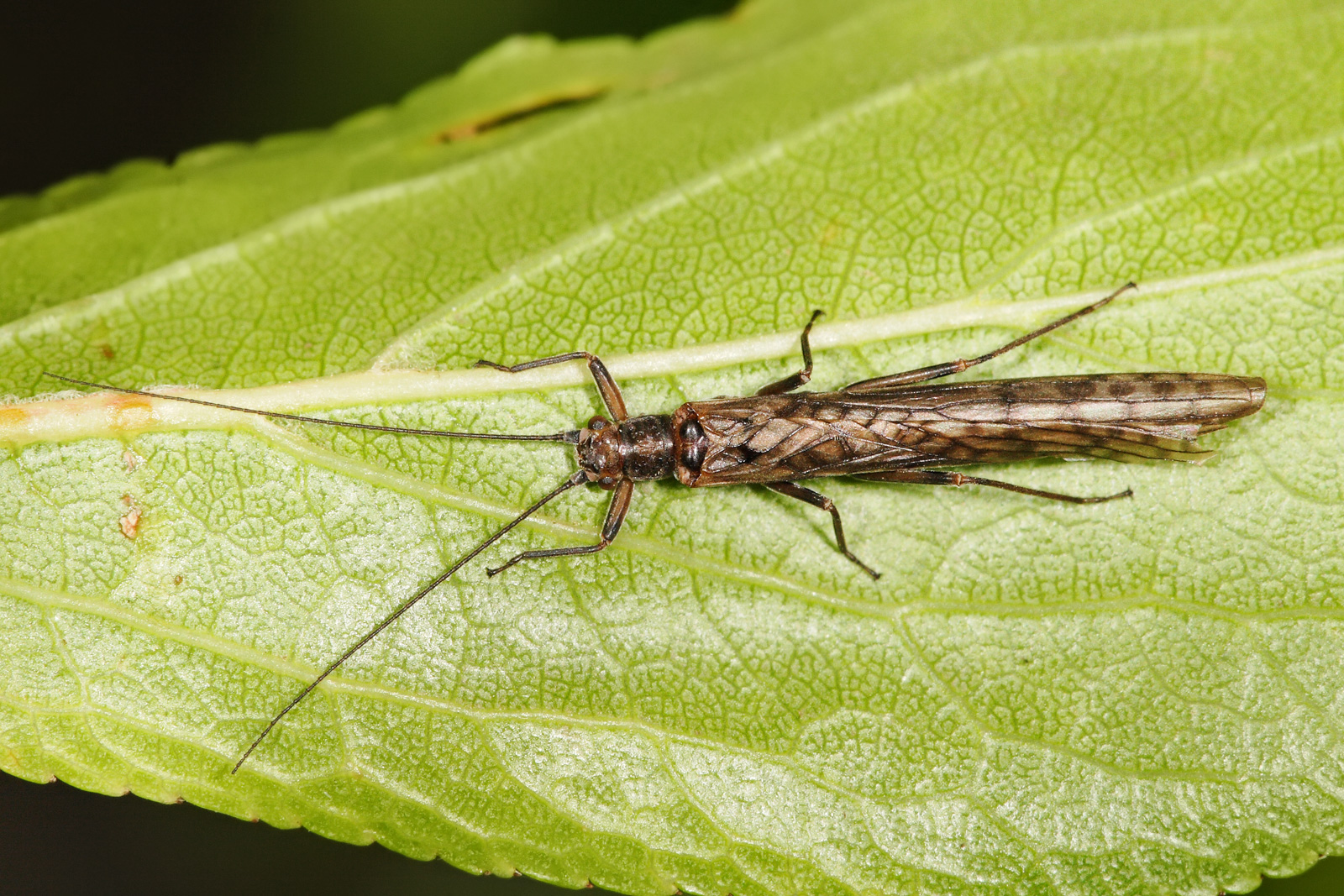
Dinotoperla imago (adult) (Gripopterygidae: Dinotoperlinae)

Stoneflies have a generalized anatomy, with few specialized features compared to other insects. They have simple mouthparts with chewing mandibles, long, multiple-segmented antennae, large compound eyes, and two or three ocelli. The legs are robust, with each ending in two claws. The abdomen is relatively soft, and may include remnants of the nymphal gills even in the adult. Both nymphs and adults have long, paired cerci projecting from the tip of their abdomens.

The name "Plecoptera" literally means "braided-wings", from the Ancient Greek plekein (πλέκειν, "to braid") and pteryx (πτέρυξ, "wing"). This refers to the complex venation of their two pairs of wings, which are membranous and fold flat over their backs. Stoneflies are generally not strong fliers, and some species are entirely wingless.

A few wingless species, specifically "Capnia" lacustra (Lake Tahoe), (Note: The genus Capnia is not monophyletic and this species is suspected to belong elsewhere.) and, possibly, Capnia khubsugulica (Lake Khovsgol), as well as some stygobitic Australian dytiscids, are the only known fully aquatic insects, that is, entirely independent of gas for respiration. All other insects that remain submerged for their entire lives still depend on air in some way, either by using a "snorkel" (Nepoidea) or plastron. Baikaloperla (containing the species B. elongata and B. koshovi) only leaves the waters of Lake Baikal to lay eggs, which do not take long to hatch; it is otherwise fully aquatic. Members of this stonefly genus, Caenis mayflies, and the species Capnia khingana and C. lacustra, are some of the only known insects to have eggs develop throughout their bodies, including the head.

The nymphs, more specifically, naiads, a name used for any aquatic insects nymph, live in the benthic zone of well-oxygenated lakes and streams. A few species found in New Zealand and nearby islands have terrestrial nymphs, but even these inhabit only very moist environments. The nymphs physically resemble wingless adults, but often have external gills, which may be present on almost any part of the body. Nymphs can acquire oxygen via diffusing through the exoskeleton, or through gills located on behind the head, on the thorax, or around the anus. Due to their nymph's requirement for well oxygenated water, the species is very sensitive to water pollution. This makes them important indicators for water quality. Most species are herbivorous as nymphs, feeding on submerged leaves and benthic algae, but many are hunters of other aquatic arthropods.

== Life cycle ==
The female can lay up to one thousand eggs. It will fly over the water and drop the eggs in the water. It also may hang on a rock or branch. Eggs are covered in a sticky coating which allows them to adhere to rocks without being swept away by swift currents. The eggs typically take two to three weeks to hatch, but some species undergo diapause, with the eggs remaining dormant throughout a dry season, and hatching only when conditions are suitable.

The insects remain in the nymphal form for one to four years, depending on species, and undergo from 12 to 36 molts before emerging and becoming terrestrial as adults. Before becoming adults, nymphs will leave the water, attach to a fixed surface and molt one last time.

The adults generally only survive for a few weeks, and emerge only during specific times of the year when resources are optimal. Some do not feed at all, but those that do are herbivorous. Adults are not strong fliers and generally stay near the stream or lake they hatched from.

== Phylogeny ==
A summary of the phylogeny of stoneflies is shown below. While the Antarctoperlaria, Arctoperlaria, Euholognatha, Systellognatha are well supported, several further relationships are disputed. Some families have only been analyzed by one study (indicated by dashed lines) and their placement may change in the near future.

- Plecoptera
  - Antarctoperlaria
    - Gripopterygoidea
      - Austroperlidae
      - Gripopterygidae
    - Eusthenioidea
      - Diamphipnoidae
      - Eustheniidae
  - Arctoperlaria
    - Euholognatha
      - - Scopuridae
        - Taeniopterygidae
      - Leuctridae
      - Capniidae
      - - Nemouridae
        - Notonemouridae
    - Systellognatha
      - Peltoperlidae
      - Pteronarcyidae
      - Styloperlidae
      - Perloidea
        - Perlidae
        - - Chloroperlidae
          - Perlodidae
