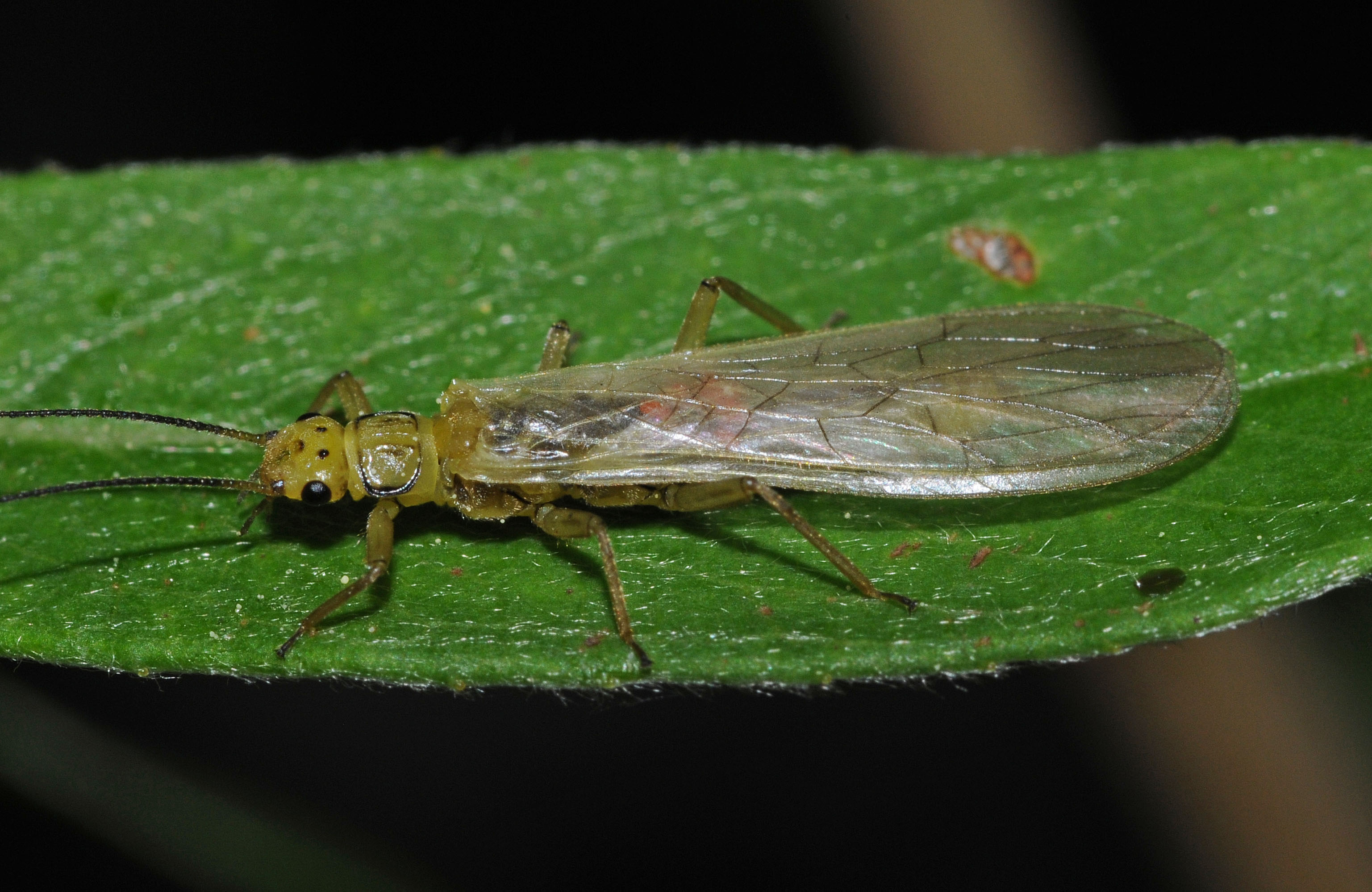

Scientific classification
- Domain: Eukaryota
- Kingdom: Animalia
- Phylum: Arthropoda
- Class: Insecta
- Order: Plecoptera
- Family: Chloroperlidae
- Genus: Sweltsa
- Species: S. townesi

Binomial name
- Sweltsa townesi (Ricker, 1952)

= Sweltsa townesi =

Species of stonefly

Sweltsa townesi is a species of the stonefly genus Sweltsa. Its known range is in the Sierra Nevada Mountains of California and Nevada.
