= Alloperla roberti =

Conservation status
- Extinct (IUCN 2.3)

Scientific classification
- Kingdom: Animalia
- Phylum: Arthropoda
- Class: Insecta
- Order: Plecoptera
- Family: Chloroperlidae
- Genus: Alloperla
- Species: †A. roberti

Binomial name
- †Alloperla roberti Surdick, 1981
- Location of Rock Island County, Illinois, the type locality

Species of stonefly

Alloperla roberti, the Illinois sawfly or Robert's stonefly, is a species of stonefly in the family Chloroperlidae. It was endemic to Illinois and its type locality was in Rock Island County. It has not been seen since 1860 and is likely extinct.
