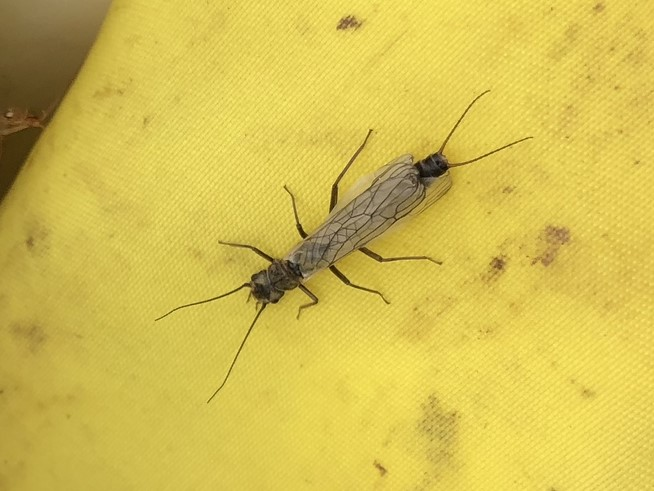

Scientific classification
- Domain: Eukaryota
- Kingdom: Animalia
- Phylum: Arthropoda
- Class: Insecta
- Order: Plecoptera
- Family: Chloroperlidae
- Genus: Paraperla
- Species: P. frontalis

Binomial name
- Paraperla frontalis (Banks, 1902)

= Paraperla frontalis =

Species of stonefly

Paraperla frontalis, the hyporheic sallfly, is a species of green stonefly in the family Chloroperlidae. It is found in North America.
