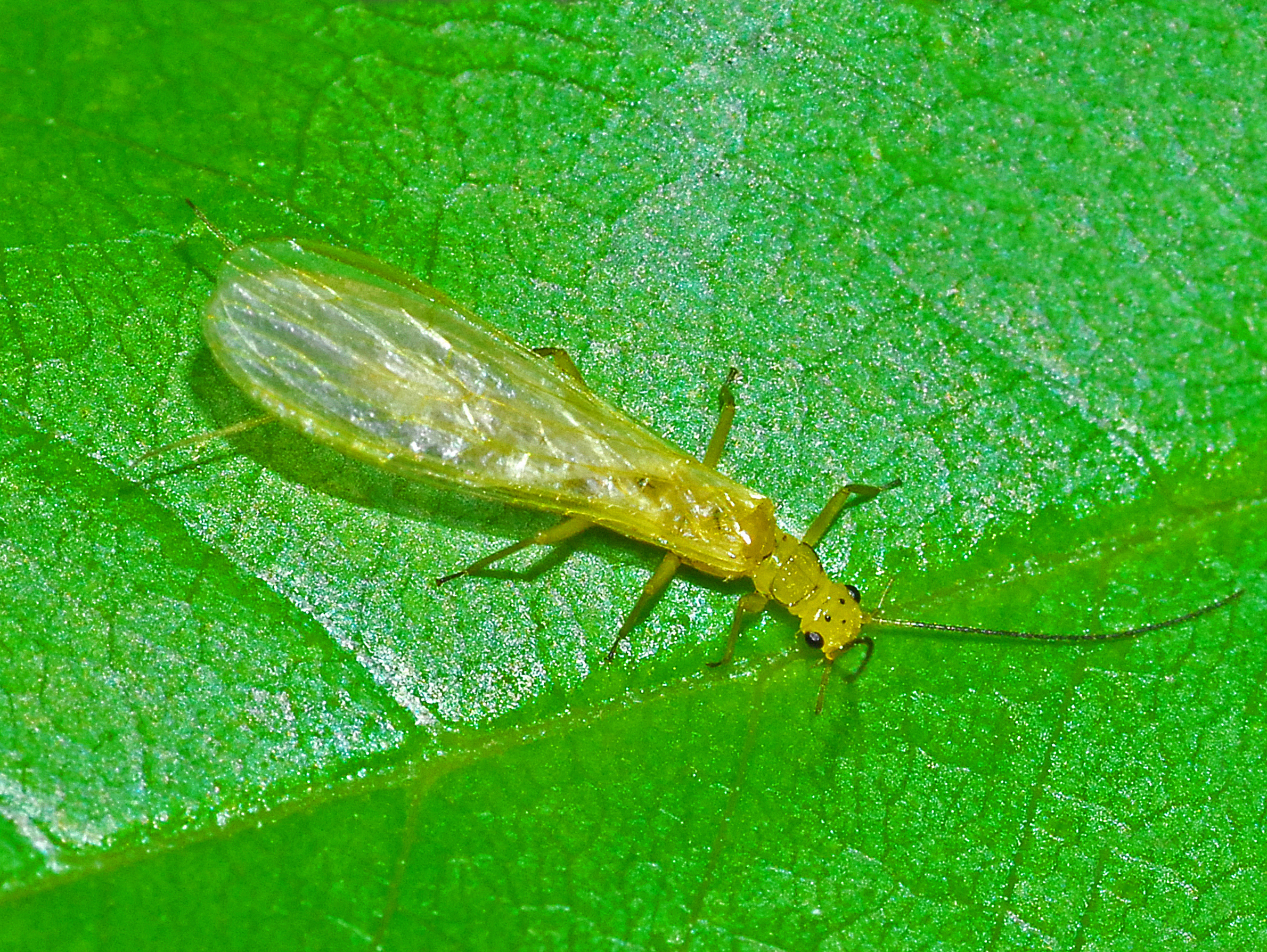
- Adult

Scientific classification
- Kingdom: Animalia
- Phylum: Arthropoda
- Class: Insecta
- Order: Plecoptera
- Family: Chloroperlidae
- Genus: Siphonoperla
- Species: S. torrentium

Binomial name
- Siphonoperla torrentium (Pictet, 1841)

Synonyms
- Perla torrentium Pictet, 1841; Chloroperla torrentium (Pictet & F.J., 1841); Isopteryx torrentium

= Siphonoperla torrentium =

Species of stonefly

Siphonoperla torrentium is a species of European stoneflies in the family Chloroperlidae.

== Subspecies ==
Subspecies include:

- Siphonoperla torrentium italica (Aubert, 1953)
- Siphonoperla torrentium transsylvanica (Kis, 1963)
- Siphonoperla torrentium torrentium (Pictet, F.J., 1841)

== Distribution ==
This species is present in most of Europe (Austria, Belgium, Bosnia and Herzegovina, Great Britain, Croatia, Czech Republic, Finland, France, Germany, Hungary, Ireland, Italy, Republic of North Macedonia, Poland, Portugal, Slovakia, Spain, Switzerland, The Netherlands, Ukraine and former Yugoslavia) and in North America.

== Description ==
Siphonoperla torrentium can reach a body length of about 5–7 mm (0.20–0.28 in) in males, of about 5–8 mm (0.20–0.31 in) in females, with a wingspan of about of 13.6–15.4 mm (0.54–0.61 in) in males and of 15–17.5 mm (0.59–0.69 in) in females.

== Biology ==
This species of stoneflies has one generation a year (univoltine). Larvae can reach a length of about 9 mm (0.35 in). They are yellowish to light brown in color and show clear bristles throughout. There are dark spots on the head and pronotum. The pronotum is transversely oval and has long bristles. Tracheal gills are not present. They can be found in streams and small rivers. They have a predatory diet, while adults feed on pollen.

== Bibliography ==
- Costello, M.J, 1988, A Review of the Distribution of Stoneflies (Insecta, Plecoptera) in Ireland, Proceedings of the Royal Irish Academy, 88B: 1-22
- Hynes, H.B.N., 1958, A key to the adults and nymphs of the British stoneflies (Plecoptera) with notes on their ecology and distribution.
- Marten in Landolt & Sartori [Ed.] (1997) Ephemeroptera and Plecoptera of the River Danube in BAden-Wurttemberg (Germany), Ephemeroptera & Plecoptera. Biology-Ecology-Systematics. Proceedings of the Eighth International Conference on Ephemeroptera and the Twelfth International Symposium on Plecoptera held in August 1995 in Lausanne, MTL - Mauron + Tinguely & Lachat SA, Fribourg 167-174
- Wise, E.J & O'Connor, J.P, 1997, Observations on the distribution and relative abundance of the Ephemeroptera and Plecoptera in the Killarney Valley. Landolt, P and Sartori, M (eds), Ephemeroptera and plecoptera: Biology-Ecology-Systematics, 175-179. MTL,
