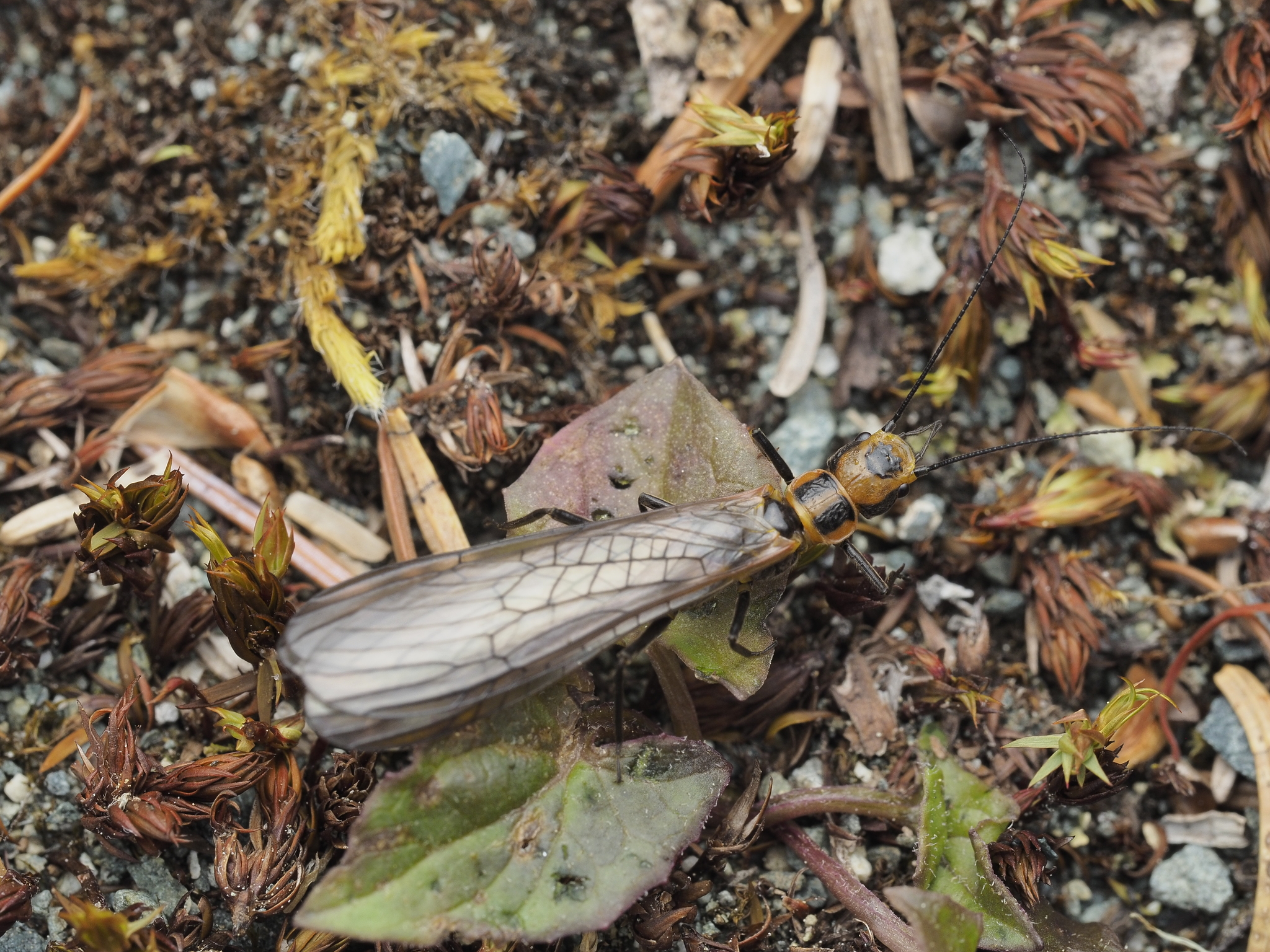
- Slenderhead Sallfly (Kathroperla takhoma) in Canada

Scientific classification
- Kingdom: Animalia
- Phylum: Arthropoda
- Class: Insecta
- Order: Plecoptera
- Family: Kathroperlidae
- Genus: Kathroperla
- Species: K. takhoma

Binomial name
- Kathroperla takhoma Stark & Surdick, 1987

= Kathroperla takhoma =

Species of stonefly

Kathroperla takhoma, the slenderhead sallfly, is a species of green stonefly in the family Chloroperlidae. It is found in North America.
