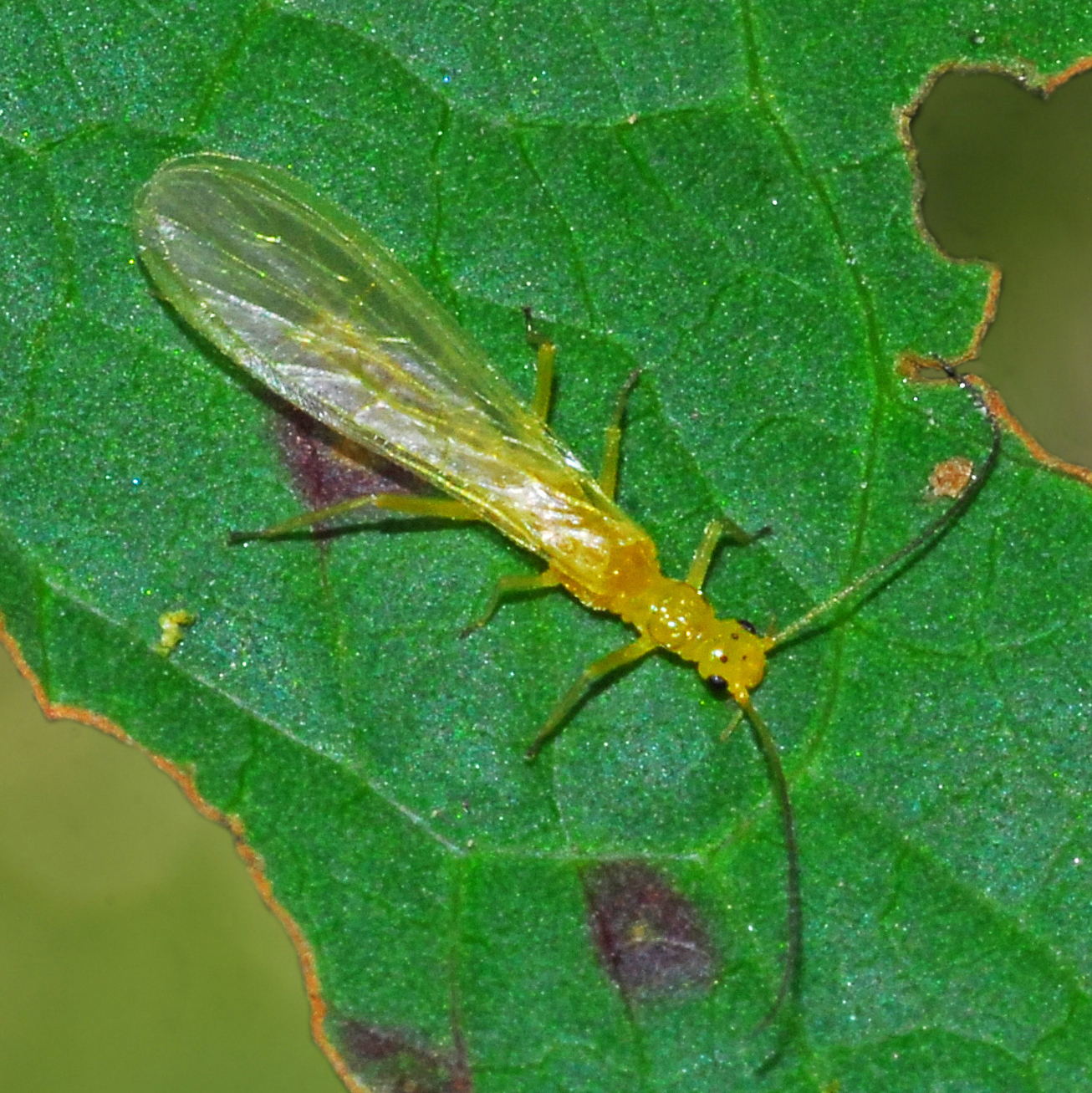
- Adult of Xanthoperla apicalis

Scientific classification
- Kingdom: Animalia
- Phylum: Arthropoda
- Class: Insecta
- Order: Plecoptera
- Family: Chloroperlidae
- Genus: Xanthoperla
- Species: X. apicalis

Binomial name
- Xanthoperla apicalis (Newman, 1836)

Synonyms
- Chloroperla apicalis Newman, 1836; Chloroperla bengtssonia (Claassen, 1936); Chloroperla borealis (Bengtsson, 1933); Chloroperla pallida (Stephens, 1836); Isopteryx hamulata (Morton, 1930); Leptomeres albida (Rambur, 1842); Leptomeres pallidella (Rambur, 1842)

= Xanthoperla apicalis =

Species of stonefly

Xanthoperla apicalis is a species of stoneflies in the family Chloroperlidae.

== Subspecies ==
- Xanthoperla apicalis hamulata (Morton, 1930)

== Distribution and habitat ==
This species is present in most of Europe (Albania, Belgium, Germany, Great Britain, Finland, France, the Netherlands, Italy, Norway, Austria, Poland, Romania, Sweden, Switzerland, Spain, Czech Republic, Slovakia, Lithuania, Hungary, Republic of North Macedonia, Ukraine). Only known in UK from three specimens in the Oxford Museum of Natural History, locality of origin unknown. These stoneflies occur in lakes, streams and wetlands.

== Description ==
Xanthoperla apicalis can reach a body length of about 5.5 mm (0.22 in) in males, of about 6 mm (0.24 in) in females, with a forewing length of about of 6–.9 mm (0.236–0.035 in) in males and of 6.8–7.9 mm (0.27–0.31 in) in females. These small stoneflies have convex and protruding eyes and a rather narrow and long pronotum. The head is pale yellow, with black margins. Abdomen shows a relatively short dorsal dark. Legs are yellowish.

== Biology ==
This species of stoneflies has one generation a year (univoltine). Adults can be found from Spring to Summer, between May and July. Larvae have a carnivorous-detritivorous diet, while adults feed on pollen from angiosperms and pinaceae.

== Bibliography ==
- Claassen (1936) New Names for Stoneflies (Plecoptera), Annals of the Entomological Society of America (Ann. ent. Soc. Amer.) 29(4):622-623
- Morton (1930) Plecoptera collected in Corsica, by Mr. Martin E. Mosely, Entomologist's Monthly Magazine (Entomol. Mon. Mag.) 66:75-81 + 1 pl.
- Rambur (1842), Histoire naturelle des insectes: Neuroptéres., Librairie Encyclopédique de Roret, Paris i-vi, 1–534, 12 pl
- Stephens (1836), Illustrations of British entomology; or a synopsis of indigenous insects: containing their generic and specific distinctions with an account of their metamorphoses, times of appearance, localities, food and economy, as far as practicable, with coloured figures (from Westwood) of the rare and more interesting species, Baldwin & Cradock, London 6:134-145
- Kimmins (1970) A list of the type-specimens of Plecoptera and Megaloptera in the British Museum (Natural History), Bulletin of the British Museum (Natural History) Entomology (Bull. Br. Mus. Nat. Hist. Ent.) 24(8):337-361
- Claassen (1940) A catalogue of the Plecoptera of the world, Memoirs of the Cornell University Agricultural Experiment Station (Mem. Cornell agric. Exp. Sta.) 232:1-235
