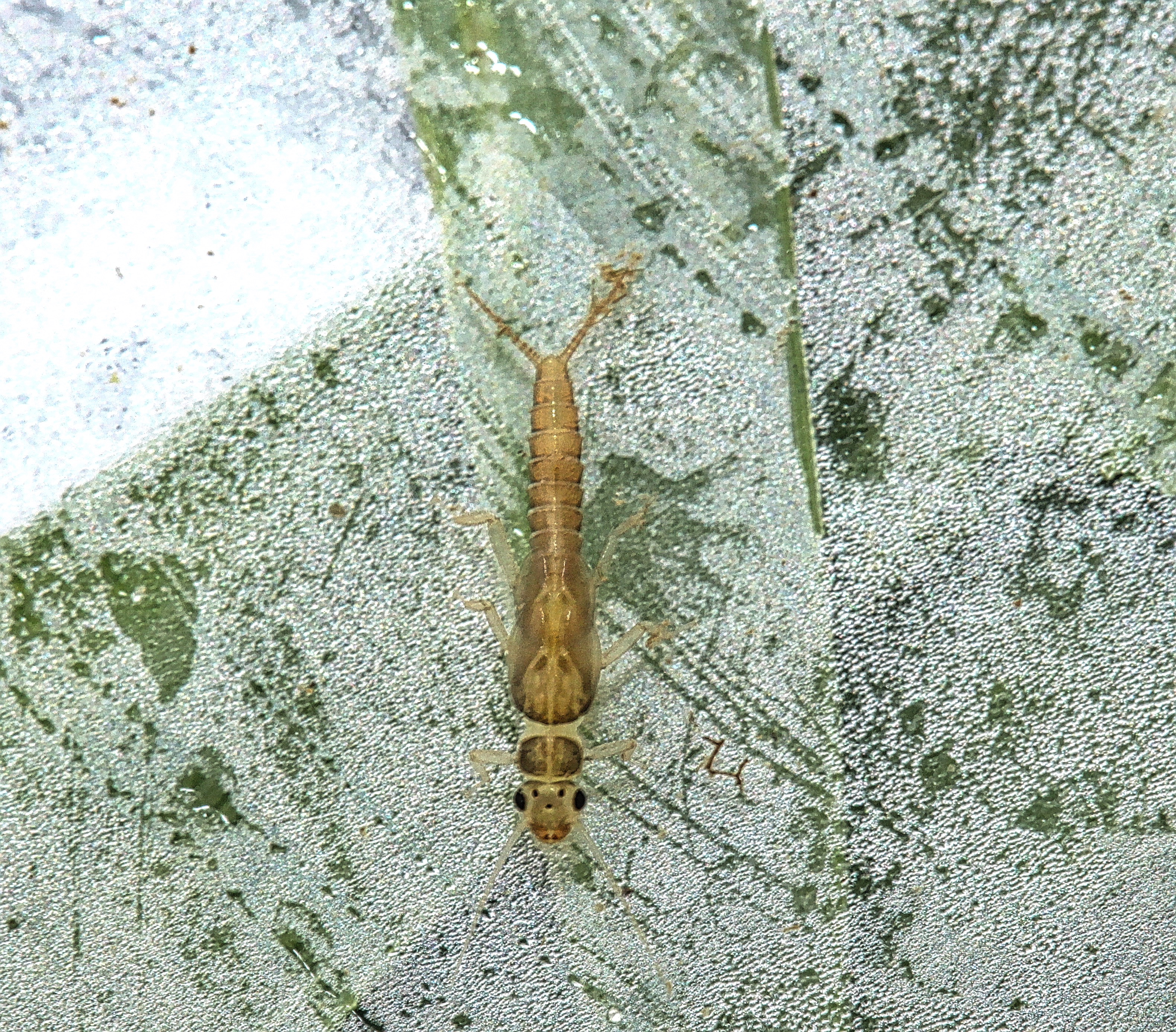

Scientific classification
- Domain: Eukaryota
- Kingdom: Animalia
- Phylum: Arthropoda
- Class: Insecta
- Order: Plecoptera
- Family: Chloroperlidae
- Genus: Haploperla
- Species: H. brevis

Binomial name
- Haploperla brevis (Banks, 1895)

Synonyms
- Chloroperla brevis Banks, 1895

= Haploperla brevis =

Species of stonefly

Haploperla brevis, the least sallfly, is a species of green stonefly in the family Chloroperlidae. It is found in North America.
