= Alloperla concolor =

Scientific classification
- Domain: Eukaryota
- Kingdom: Animalia
- Phylum: Arthropoda
- Class: Insecta
- Order: Plecoptera
- Family: Chloroperlidae
- Subfamily: Chloroperlinae
- Genus: Alloperla
- Species: A. concolor

Binomial name
- Alloperla concolor Ricker, 1935

Species of stonefly

Alloperla concolor, the duckhead sallfly, is a species of green stonefly in the family Chloroperlidae. It is found in North America.
