= Suwallia =

Scientific classification
- Domain: Eukaryota
- Kingdom: Animalia
- Phylum: Arthropoda
- Class: Insecta
- Order: Plecoptera
- Family: Chloroperlidae
- Subfamily: Chloroperlinae
- Genus: Suwallia; Ricker, 1943

Synonyms
- Neaviperla Ricker, 1943

Genus of stoneflies

Suwallia is a genus of green stoneflies in the family Chloroperlidae. There are more than 20 described species in Suwallia.

== Species ==
These 25 species belong to the genus Suwallia:

- Suwallia amoenacolens Alexander & Stewart, 1999
- Suwallia asiatica Zhiltzova & Levanidova, 1978
- Suwallia autumna (Hoppe, 1938)
- Suwallia bimaculata (Okamoto, 1912)
- Suwallia decolorata Zhiltzova & Levanidova, 1978
- Suwallia dubia (Frison, 1935)
- Suwallia jezoensis (Kohno, 1953)
- Suwallia kerzhneri Zhiltzova & Zwick, 1971
- Suwallia lineosa (Banks, 1918)
- Suwallia marginata (Banks, 1897) (York sallfly)
- Suwallia nipponica (Okamoto, 1912)
- Suwallia pallidula (Banks, 1904)
- Suwallia sachalina Zhiltzova, 1978
- Suwallia salish Alexander & Stewart, 1999
- Suwallia shepardi Alexander & Stewart, 1999
- Suwallia shimizui Alexander & Stewart, 1999
- Suwallia sierra Baumann & Bottorff, 1997
- Suwallia starki Alexander & Stewart, 1999
- Suwallia sublimis Alexander & Stewart, 1999
- Suwallia talalajensis Zhiltzova, 1976
- Suwallia teleckojensis (Šámal, 1939)
- Suwallia thoracica (Okamoto, 1912)
- Suwallia tsudai (Kawai, 1967)
- Suwallia wardi Kondratieff & Kirchner, 1991
- Suwallia wolongshana Du & Chen, 2015
