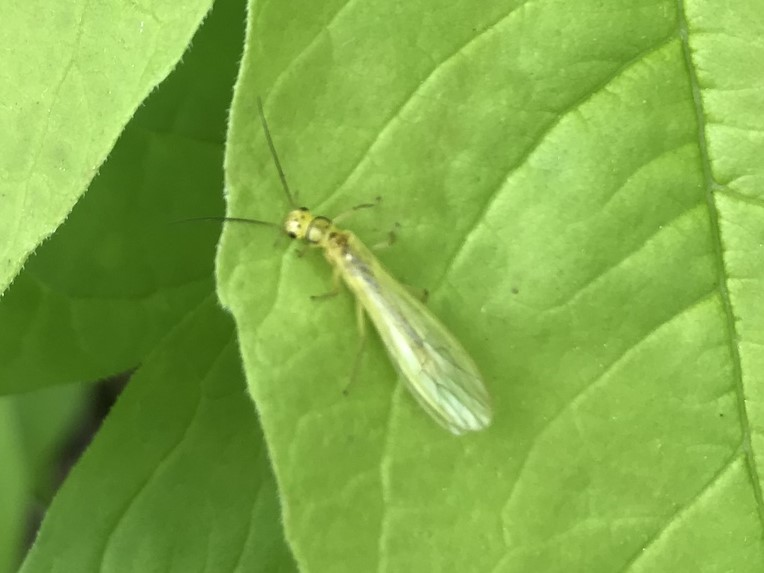

Scientific classification
- Domain: Eukaryota
- Kingdom: Animalia
- Phylum: Arthropoda
- Class: Insecta
- Order: Plecoptera
- Family: Chloroperlidae
- Subfamily: Chloroperlinae
- Genus: Sweltsa
- Species: S. lateralis

Binomial name
- Sweltsa lateralis (Banks, 1911)

Synonyms
- Alloperla lateralis Banks, 1911

= Sweltsa lateralis =

Species of stonefly

Sweltsa lateralis, the curved sallfly, is a species of green stonefly in the family Chloroperlidae. It is found in North America.
