= Alloperla acadiana =

Scientific classification
- Kingdom: Animalia
- Phylum: Arthropoda
- Clade: Pancrustacea
- Class: Insecta
- Order: Plecoptera
- Family: Chloroperlidae
- Genus: Alloperla
- Species: A. acadiana

Binomial name
- Alloperla acadiana Harper, 1984

Species of stonefly

Alloperla acadiana, also known as the Brunswick sallfly, is a species of stonefly in the family Chloroperlidae and genus Alloperla occurring in freshwater, possibly endemic to New Brunswick. It is only known from a single male specimen taken at Pokiok, New Brunswick in 1983.
