= Utaperla gaspesiana =

Scientific classification
- Domain: Eukaryota
- Kingdom: Animalia
- Phylum: Arthropoda
- Class: Insecta
- Order: Plecoptera
- Family: Chloroperlidae
- Genus: Utaperla
- Species: U. gaspesiana

Binomial name
- Utaperla gaspesiana Harper & Roy, 1975

Species of stonefly

Utaperla gaspesiana, the Gaspe sallfly, is a species of green stonefly in the family Chloroperlidae. It is found in North America.
