= Suwallia marginata =

Scientific classification
- Domain: Eukaryota
- Kingdom: Animalia
- Phylum: Arthropoda
- Class: Insecta
- Order: Plecoptera
- Family: Chloroperlidae
- Subfamily: Chloroperlinae
- Genus: Suwallia
- Species: S. marginata

Binomial name
- Suwallia marginata (Banks, 1897)

Species of stonefly

Suwallia marginata, the York sallfly, is a species of green stonefly in the family Chloroperlidae. It is found in North America.
