= Sweltsa naica =

Scientific classification
- Domain: Eukaryota
- Kingdom: Animalia
- Phylum: Arthropoda
- Class: Insecta
- Order: Plecoptera
- Family: Chloroperlidae
- Subfamily: Chloroperlinae
- Genus: Sweltsa
- Species: S. naica

Binomial name
- Sweltsa naica (Provancher, 1876)

Species of stonefly

Sweltsa naica, the northeastern sallfly, is a species of green stonefly in the family Chloroperlidae. It is found in North America.
