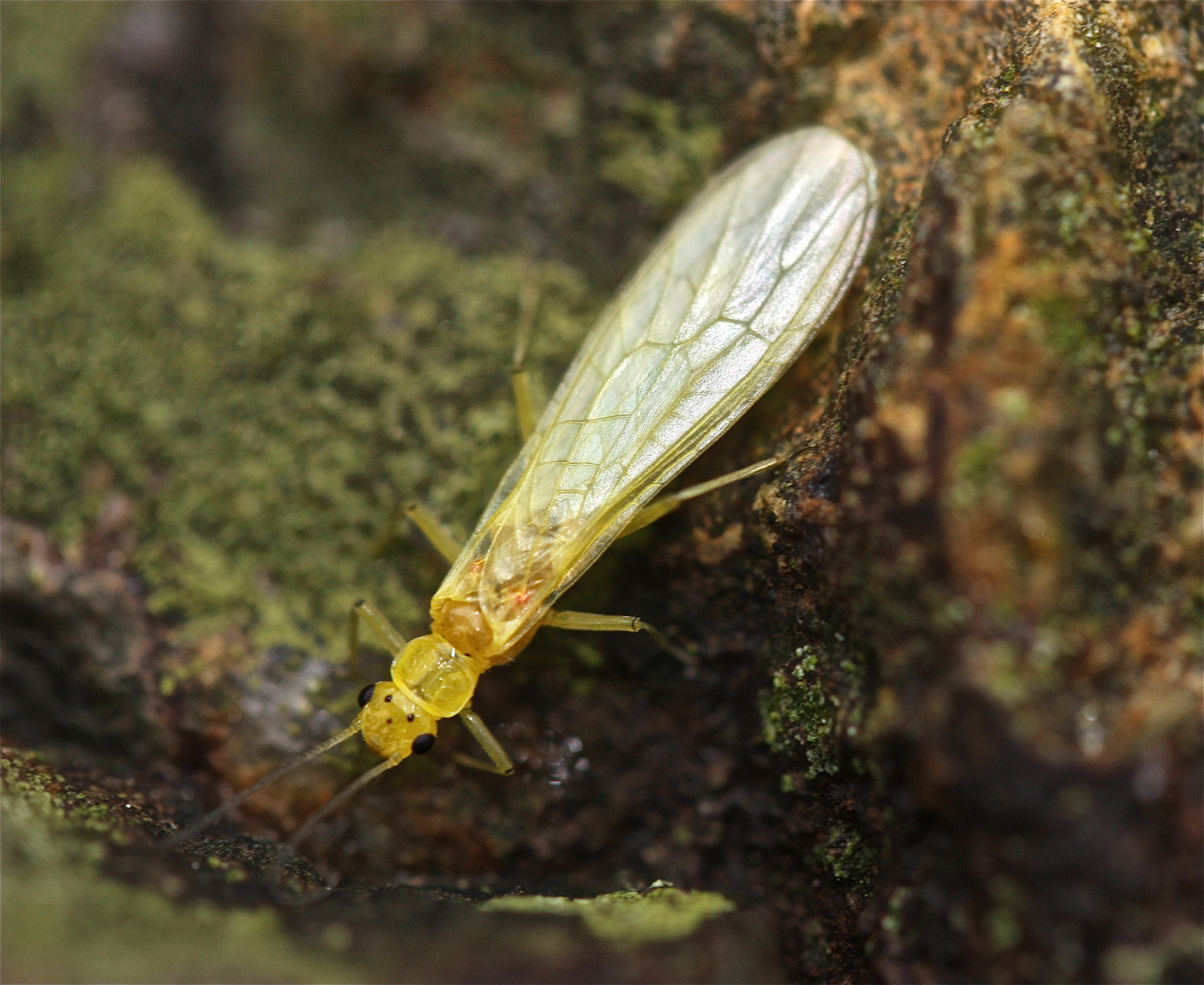

Scientific classification
- Domain: Eukaryota
- Kingdom: Animalia
- Phylum: Arthropoda
- Class: Insecta
- Order: Plecoptera
- Family: Chloroperlidae
- Genus: Sweltsa
- Species: S. onkos

Binomial name
- Sweltsa onkos (Ricker, 1935)

= Sweltsa onkos =

Species of stonefly

Sweltsa onkos, the Ontario sallfly, is a species of green stonefly in the family Chloroperlidae. It is found in North America.
