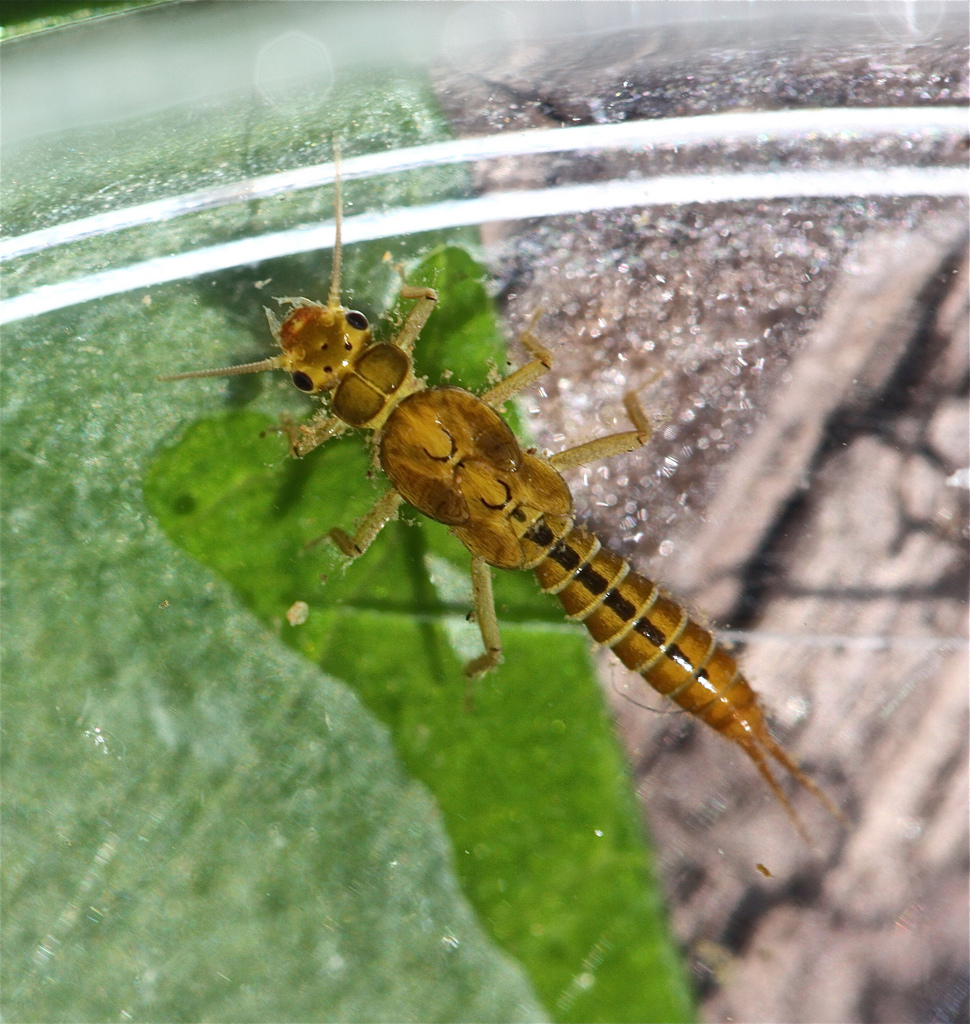

Scientific classification
- Domain: Eukaryota
- Kingdom: Animalia
- Phylum: Arthropoda
- Class: Insecta
- Order: Plecoptera
- Family: Chloroperlidae
- Subfamily: Chloroperlinae
- Genus: Sweltsa; Ricker, 1943

= Sweltsa =

Genus of stoneflies

Sweltsa is a genus of green stoneflies in the family Chloroperlidae. There are more than 50 described species in Sweltsa.

== Species ==
These 54 species belong to the genus Sweltsa:

- Sweltsa abdominalis (Okamoto, 1912)
- Sweltsa adamantea Surdick, 1995
- Sweltsa albertensis (Needham & Claassen, 1925)
- Sweltsa assam Zwick, 1971
- Sweltsa baiyunshana Li, Yang & Yao, 2014
- Sweltsa borealis (Banks, 1895) (boreal sallfly)
- Sweltsa brevihamula Dong, Cui & Li, 2018
- Sweltsa californica (Jewett, 1965)
- Sweltsa coloradensis (Banks, 1898) (Colorado sallfly)
- Sweltsa colorata Zhiltzova & Levanidova, 1978
- Sweltsa continua (Banks, 1911)
- Sweltsa cristata Surdick, 1995
- Sweltsa durfeei Kondratieff & Baumann, 2009
- Sweltsa exquisita (Frison, 1935)
- Sweltsa fidelis (Banks, 1920)
- Sweltsa gaufini Baumann, 1973
- Sweltsa hamula Chen & Du, 2017
- Sweltsa hoffmani Kondratieff & Kirchner, 2009
- Sweltsa holstonensis Kondratieff & Kirchner, 1998
- Sweltsa hondo Baumann & Jacobi, 1984
- Sweltsa illiesi Zhiltzova & Levanidova, 1978
- Sweltsa insularis Zhiltzova, 1978
- Sweltsa kibunensis (Kawai, 1967)
- Sweltsa lamba (Needham & Claassen, 1925)
- Sweltsa lateralis (Banks, 1911) (curved sallfly)
- Sweltsa lepnevae Zhiltzova, 1977
- Sweltsa longistyla (Wu, 1938)
- Sweltsa lyrata Stark & Baumann, 2018
- Sweltsa mediana (Banks, 1911)
- Sweltsa mogollonica Stark & Baumann, 2018
- Sweltsa naica (Provancher, 1876) (northeastern sallfly)
- Sweltsa nikkoensis (Okamoto, 1912)
- Sweltsa occidens (Frison, 1937)
- Sweltsa onkos (Ricker, 1935) (Ontario sallfly)
- Sweltsa oregonensis (Frison, 1935)
- Sweltsa pacifica (Banks, 1895)
- Sweltsa palearata Surdick, 2004
- Sweltsa pisteri Baumann & Bottorff, 1997
- Sweltsa pocahontas Kirchner & Kondratieff, 1988
- Sweltsa recurvata (Wu, 1938)
- Sweltsa resima Surdick, 1995
- Sweltsa revelstoka (Jewett, 1955)
- Sweltsa salix Lee & Baumann, 2010
- Sweltsa shibakawae (Okamoto, 1912)
- Sweltsa tamalpa (Ricker, 1952)
- Sweltsa tibetensis Li, Pan & Liu, 2017
- Sweltsa townesi (Ricker, 1952)
- Sweltsa umbonata Surdick, 1995
- Sweltsa urticae (Ricker, 1952)
- Sweltsa voshelli Kondratieff & Kirchner, 1991
- Sweltsa wui Stark & Sivec, 2009
- Sweltsa yunnan Tierno de Figueroa & Fochetti, 2002
- Sweltsa yurok Stark & Baumann, 2007
- Sweltsa zhiltzovae Zwick, 2010
