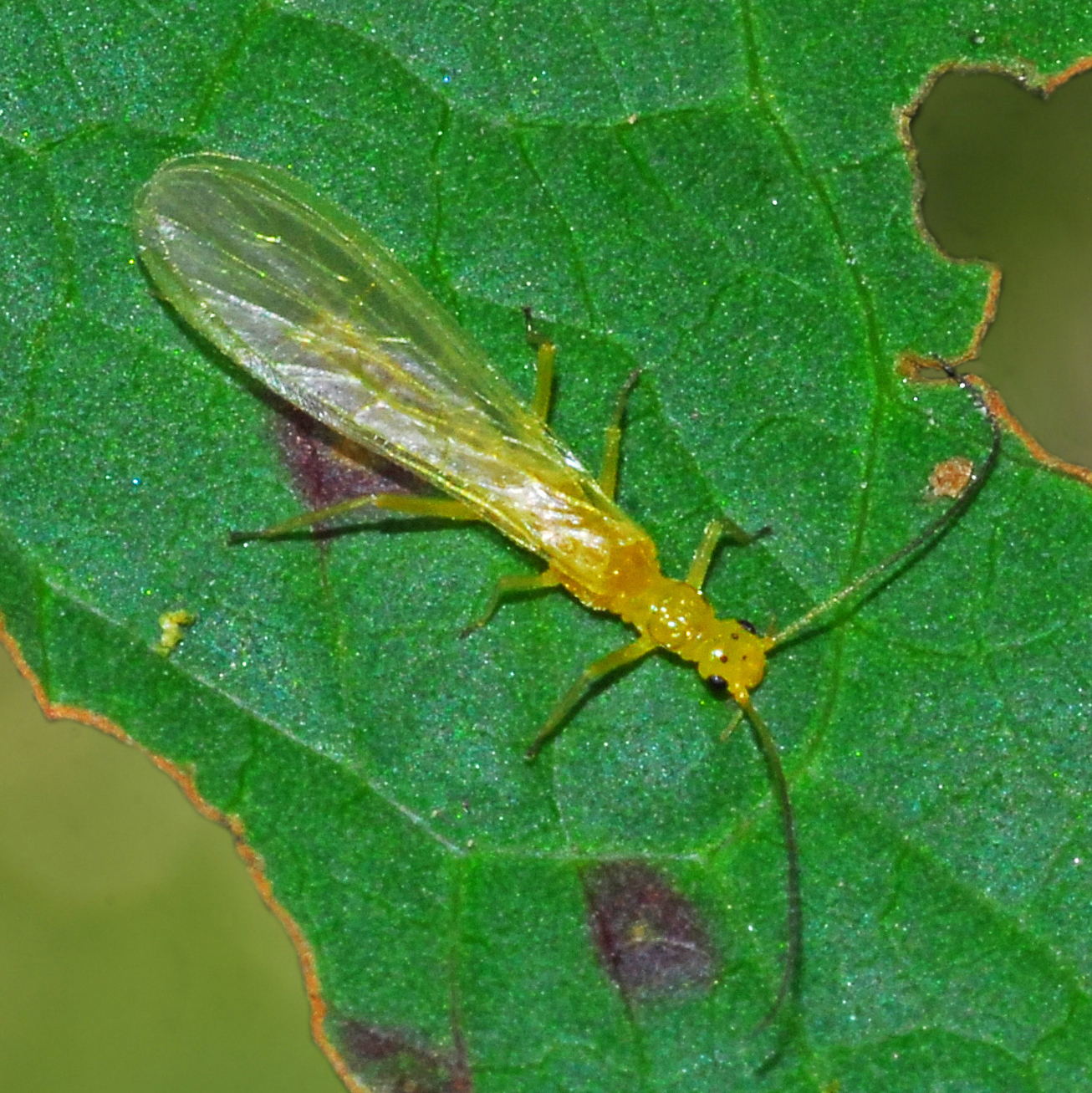
- Xanthoperla apicalis

Scientific classification
- Kingdom: Animalia
- Phylum: Arthropoda
- Class: Insecta
- Order: Plecoptera
- Family: Chloroperlidae
- Subfamily: Chloroperlinae
- Genus: Xanthoperla; Zwick, 1967

= Xanthoperla =

Genus of stoneflies

Xanthoperla is a genus of stoneflies in the family Chloroperlidae.

== Species ==
Species within this genus include:

- Xanthoperla acuta Zwick, 1980
- Xanthoperla apicalis (Newman, 1836)
- Xanthoperla curta (McLachlan, 1875)
- Xanthoperla gissarica Zhiltzova & Zwick, 1971
- Xanthoperla kishanganga (Aubert, 1959)
- Xanthoperla yerkoyi Kazanci, 1983
