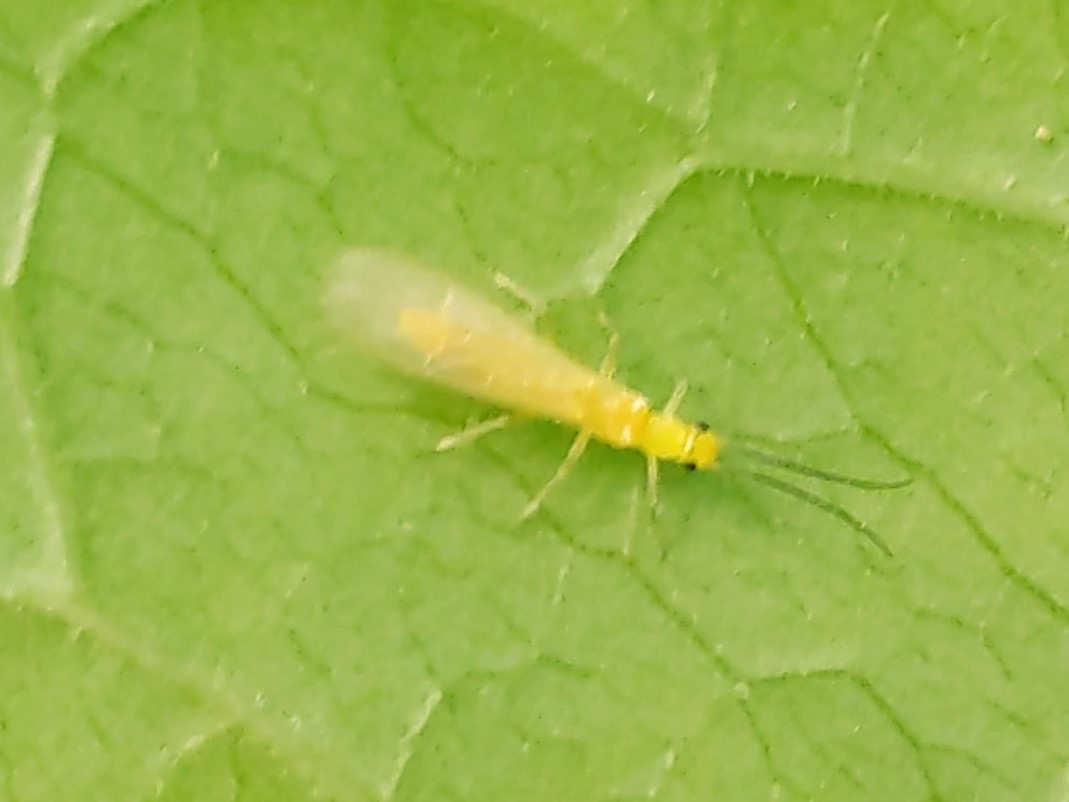
- Haploperla sp.

Scientific classification
- Domain: Eukaryota
- Kingdom: Animalia
- Phylum: Arthropoda
- Class: Insecta
- Order: Plecoptera
- Family: Chloroperlidae
- Subfamily: Chloroperlinae
- Genus: Haploperla; Navás, 1934

Synonyms
- Hastaperla Ricker, 1935

= Haploperla =

Genus of stoneflies

Haploperla is a genus of green stoneflies in the family Chloroperlidae. There are about 17 described species in Haploperla.

== Species ==
These 17 species belong to the genus Haploperla:

- Haploperla brevis (Banks, 1895) (least sallfly)
- Haploperla chilnualna (Ricker, 1952)
- Haploperla choui Li & Yao, 2013
- Haploperla chukcho (Surdick & Stark, 1980)
- Haploperla datongensis Chen & Du, 2016
- Haploperla fleeki Kondratieff, Kirchner & Lenat, 2005
- Haploperla japonica Kohno, 1946
- Haploperla lepnevae Zhiltzova & Zwick, 1971
- Haploperla longicauda Zwick, 1977
- Haploperla maritima Zhiltzova & Levanidova, 1978
- Haploperla orpha (Frison, 1937)
- Haploperla parkeri Kirchner & Kondratieff, 2005
- Haploperla triangulata Chen & Du, 2016
- Haploperla tuanjiena Du & Chen, 2016
- Haploperla ussurica Navás, 1934
- Haploperla valentinae Stark & Sivec, 2009
- Haploperla zwicki Stark & Sivec, 2008
