= Neaviperla =

Scientific classification
- Domain: Eukaryota
- Kingdom: Animalia
- Phylum: Arthropoda
- Class: Insecta
- Order: Plecoptera
- Family: Chloroperlidae
- Tribe: Suwalliini
- Genus: Neaviperla; Ricker, 1943
- Species: N. forcipata

Binomial name
- Neaviperla forcipata (Neave, 1929)

Genus of stoneflies

Neaviperla is a genus of green stoneflies in the family Chloroperlidae. There is one described species in Neaviperla, N. forcipata, found in North America. The species was formerly called Suwallia forcipata.
