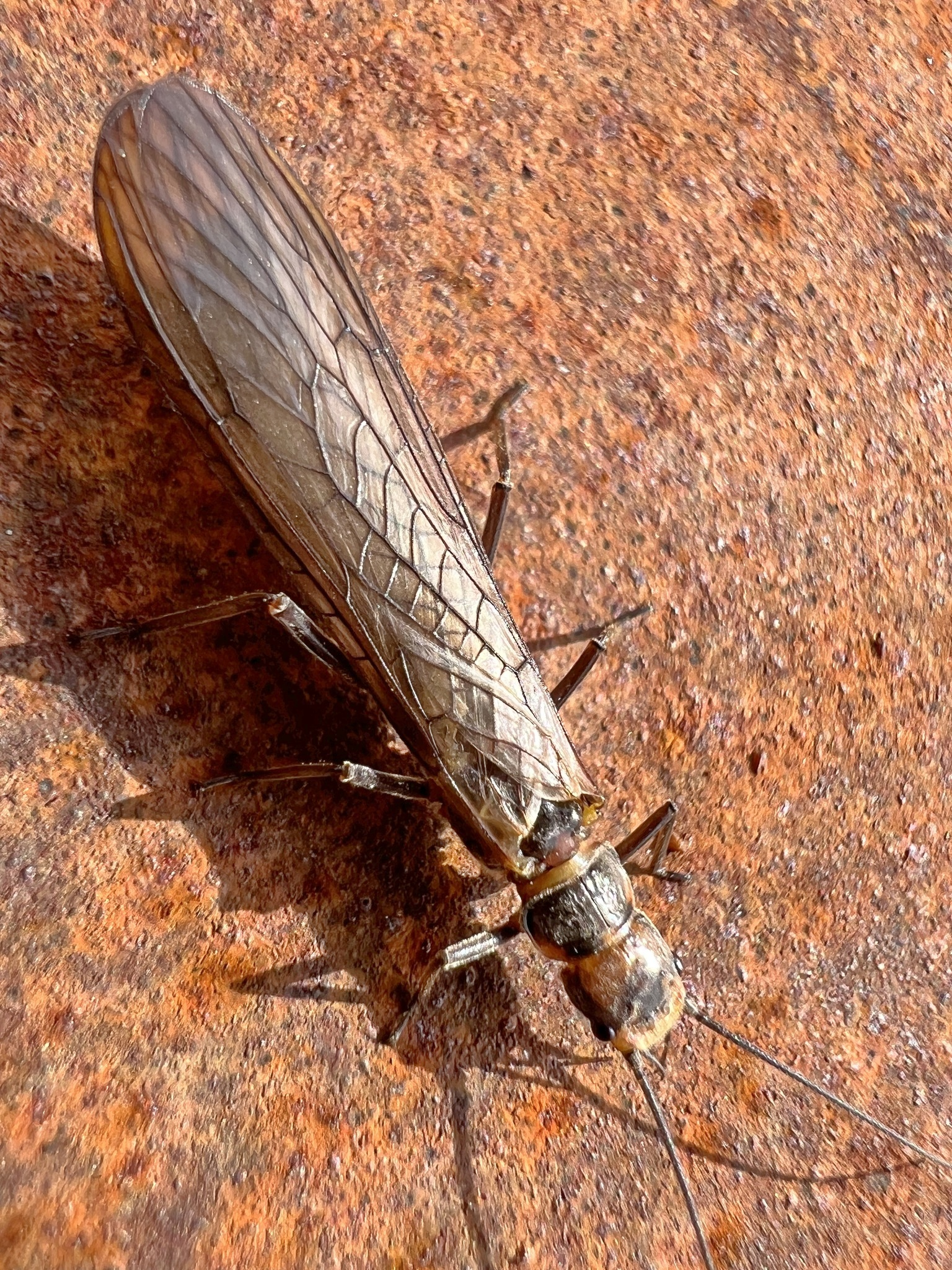

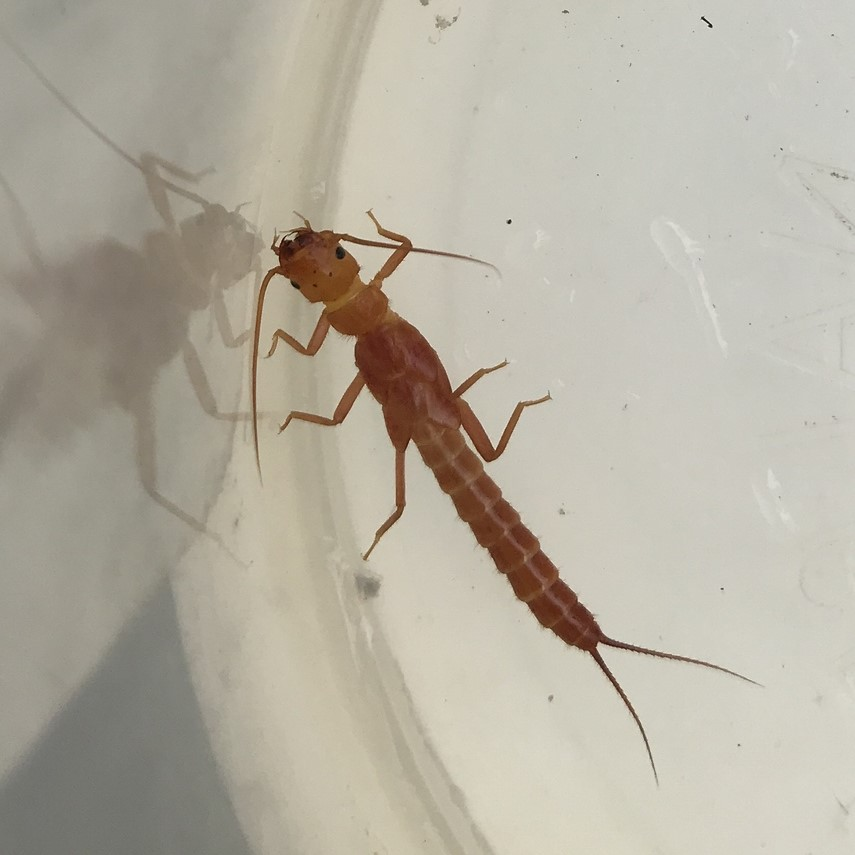
- Adult (top) and larva (bottom)

Scientific classification
- Domain: Eukaryota
- Kingdom: Animalia
- Phylum: Arthropoda
- Class: Insecta
- Order: Plecoptera
- Family: Kathroperlidae
- Genus: Kathroperla
- Species: K. perdita

Binomial name
- Kathroperla perdita Banks, 1920

= Kathroperla perdita =

Longhead sallfly

Species of stonefly

Kathroperla perdita, the longhead sallfly, is a species of green stonefly in the family Kathroperlidae. It is found in North America.
