= Utaperla =

Scientific classification
- Domain: Eukaryota
- Kingdom: Animalia
- Phylum: Arthropoda
- Class: Insecta
- Order: Plecoptera
- Family: Chloroperlidae
- Subfamily: Paraperlinae
- Genus: Utaperla; Ricker, 1952

Genus of stoneflies

Utaperla is a genus of green stoneflies in the family Chloroperlidae. There are at least four described species in Utaperla.

== Species ==
These four species belong to the genus Utaperla:

- Utaperla gaspesiana Harper & Roy, 1975 (Gaspe sallfly)
- Utaperla lepnevae (Zhiltzova, 1970)
- Utaperla orientalis Nelson & Hanson, 1969
- Utaperla sopladora Ricker, 1952
