= Isoptena =

Scientific classification
- Kingdom: Animalia
- Phylum: Arthropoda
- Clade: Pancrustacea
- Class: Insecta
- Order: Plecoptera
- Superfamily: Perloidea
- Family: Chloroperlidae
- Genus: Isoptena; Enderlein, 1909
- Species: I. serricornis

Binomial name
- Isoptena serricornis (Pictet, 1841)

Genus of stoneflies

Isoptena is a monotypic genus of insects belonging to the family Chloroperlidae. The only species is Isoptena serricornis.

== See also ==
- Biological notes on Isoptena serricornis
- Egg description of Isoptena serricornis
