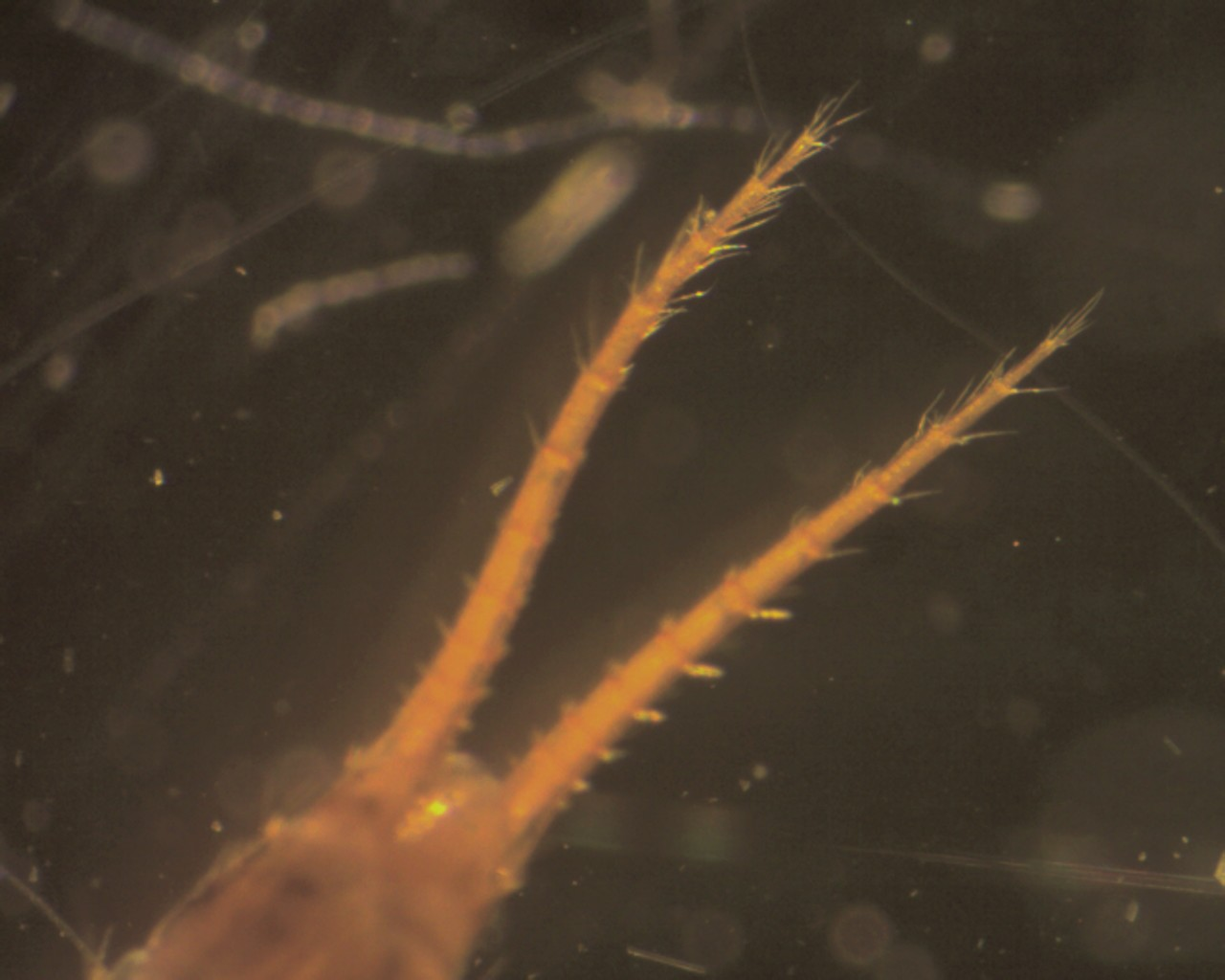

Scientific classification
- Domain: Eukaryota
- Kingdom: Animalia
- Phylum: Arthropoda
- Class: Insecta
- Order: Plecoptera
- Family: Chloroperlidae
- Subfamily: Chloroperlinae
- Genus: Alloperla; Banks, 1906

= Alloperla =

Genus of stoneflies

Alloperla is a genus of stoneflies in family Chloroperlidae. It contains the following species:

- Alloperla acadiana
- Alloperla acietata
- Alloperla aracoma
- Alloperla atlantica
- Alloperla banksi
- Alloperla biloba
- Alloperla biserrata
- Alloperla caddo
- Alloperla caudata
- Alloperla chandleri
- Alloperla chloris
- Alloperla coloradensis
- Alloperla columbiana
- Alloperla concolor
- Alloperla continua
- Alloperla cydippe
- Alloperla delicata
- Alloperla erectospina
- Alloperla fidelis
- Alloperla fraterna
- Alloperla furcula
- Alloperla hamata
- Alloperla idei
- Alloperla imbecilla
- Alloperla infuscata
- Alloperla ishikariana
- Alloperla joosti
- Alloperla kurilensis
- Alloperla lateralis
- Alloperla lenati
- Alloperla leonarda
- Alloperla medveda
- Alloperla nanina
- Alloperla natchez
- Alloperla neglecta
- Alloperla nipponica
- Alloperla ouachita
- Alloperla pagmaensis
- Alloperla petasata
- Alloperla pilosa
- Alloperla roberti
- Alloperla rostellata
- Alloperla serrata
- Alloperla severa
- Alloperla tamalpa
- Alloperla thalia
- Alloperla thompsoni
- Alloperla usa
- Alloperla voinae
- Alloperla vostoki
