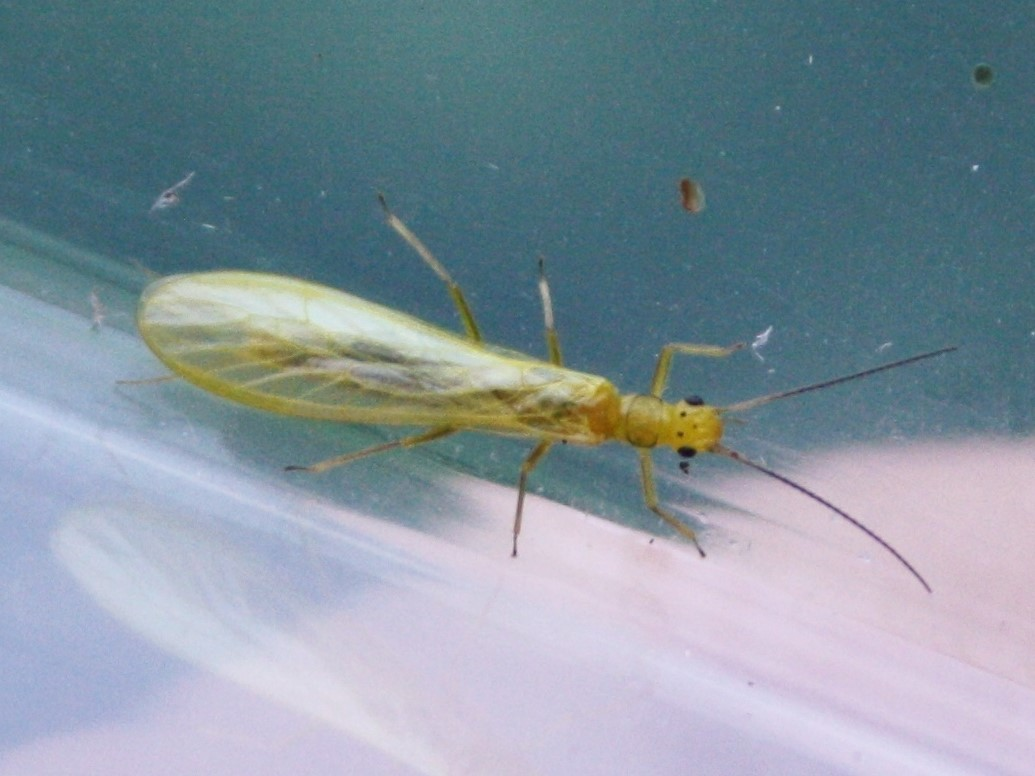
- Siphonoperla torrentium

Scientific classification
- Domain: Eukaryota
- Kingdom: Animalia
- Phylum: Arthropoda
- Class: Insecta
- Order: Plecoptera
- Family: Chloroperlidae
- Subfamily: Chloroperlinae
- Genus: Siphonoperla; Zwick, 1967

= Siphonoperla =

Genus of stoneflies

Siphonoperla is a genus of stoneflies in the family Chloroperlidae.

== Species ==
Species within this genus include:

- Siphonoperla baetica (Aubert, 1956)
- Siphonoperla burmeisteri (Pictet, 1841)
- Siphonoperla graeca (Aubert, 1956)
- Siphonoperla hajastanica (Zhiltzova, 1961)
- Siphonoperla italica (Aubert, 1953)
- Siphonoperla korab Graf, 2012
- Siphonoperla lepineyi (Navás, 1935)
- Siphonoperla libanica Alouf, 1992 (species complex)
- Siphonoperla montana (Pictet, 1841)
- Siphonoperla neglecta (Rostock, 1881)
- Siphonoperla ottomoogi Graf, 2008
- Siphonoperla taurica (Pictet, 1841)
- Siphonoperla torrentium (Pictet, 1841) - type species
- Siphonoperla transsylvanica (Kis, 1963)
