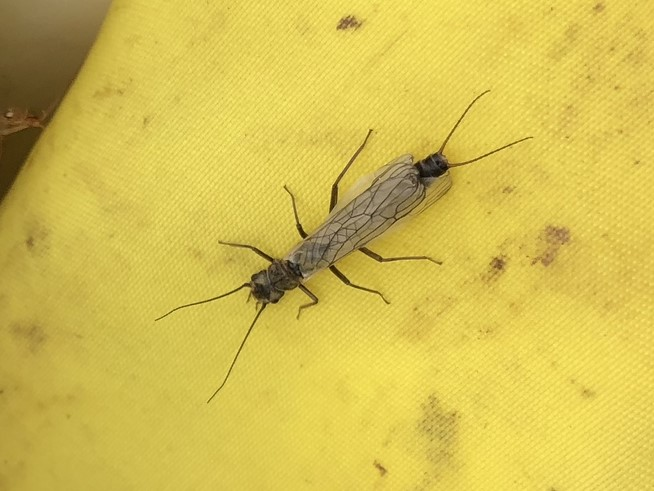
- Paraperla frontalis

Scientific classification
- Domain: Eukaryota
- Kingdom: Animalia
- Phylum: Arthropoda
- Class: Insecta
- Order: Plecoptera
- Family: Chloroperlidae
- Subfamily: Paraperlinae
- Genus: Paraperla; Banks, 1906

= Paraperla =

Genus of stoneflies

Paraperla is a genus of green stoneflies in the family Chloroperlidae. There are at least two described species in Paraperla.

== Species ==
These two species belong to the genus Paraperla:

- Paraperla frontalis (Banks, 1902) (hyporheic sallfly)
- Paraperla wilsoni Ricker, 1965
