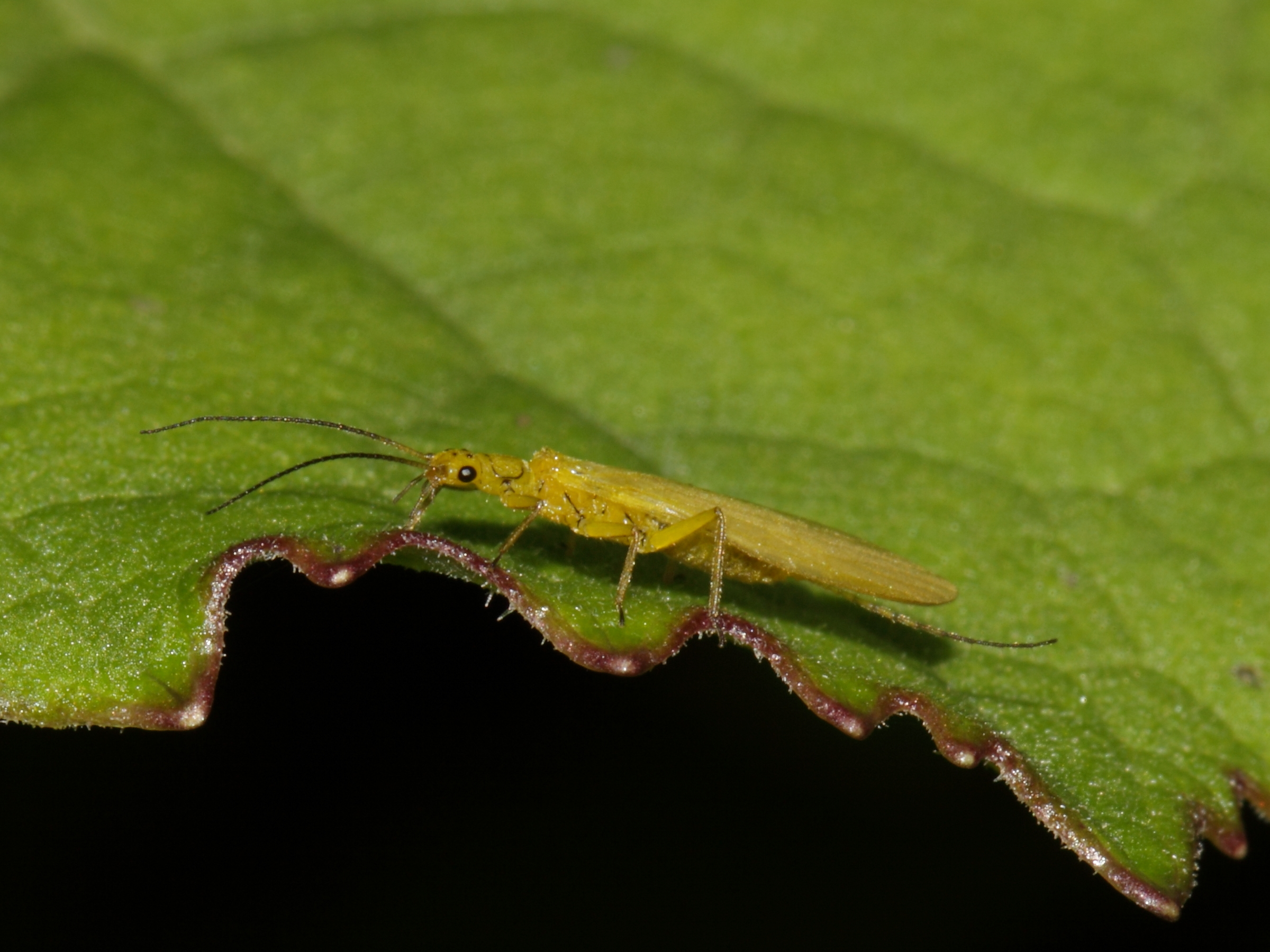
- Chloroperla sp.

Scientific classification
- Domain: Eukaryota
- Kingdom: Animalia
- Phylum: Arthropoda
- Class: Insecta
- Order: Plecoptera
- Superfamily: Perloidea
- Family: Chloroperlidae
- Subfamily: Chloroperlinae
- Genus: Chloroperla; Newman, 1836

Synonyms
- Dodecatoma Dufour, 1841; Isopteryx Pictet, 1841; Leptomeres Rambur, 1842

= Chloroperla =

Genus of insects

Chloroperla is a genus of European stone-flies, erected by Edward Newman in 1836; it is the type genus of family Chloroperlidae, subfamily Chloroperlinae and tribe Chloroperlini Okamoto, 1912. Species are distributed in western Palaearctic freshwater habitats: especially Europe and including the British Isles.

== Species ==
Hynes provides a key to the species. The Plecoptera Species File lists:

1. Chloroperla acuta Berthélemy & Whytton da Terra, 1980
2. Chloroperla brachyptera (Schoenemund, 1926)
3. Chloroperla breviata Navás, 1918
4. Chloroperla kisi Zwick, 1967
5. Chloroperla kosarovi Braasch, 1969
6. Chloroperla nevada Zwick, 1967
7. Chloroperla russevi Braasch, 1969
8. Chloroperla susemicheli Zwick, 1967
9. Chloroperla tripunctata (Scopoli, 1763) - type species (as Phryganea tripunctata Scopoli, by subsequent designation)
10. Chloroperla zhiltzovae Zwick, 1967
