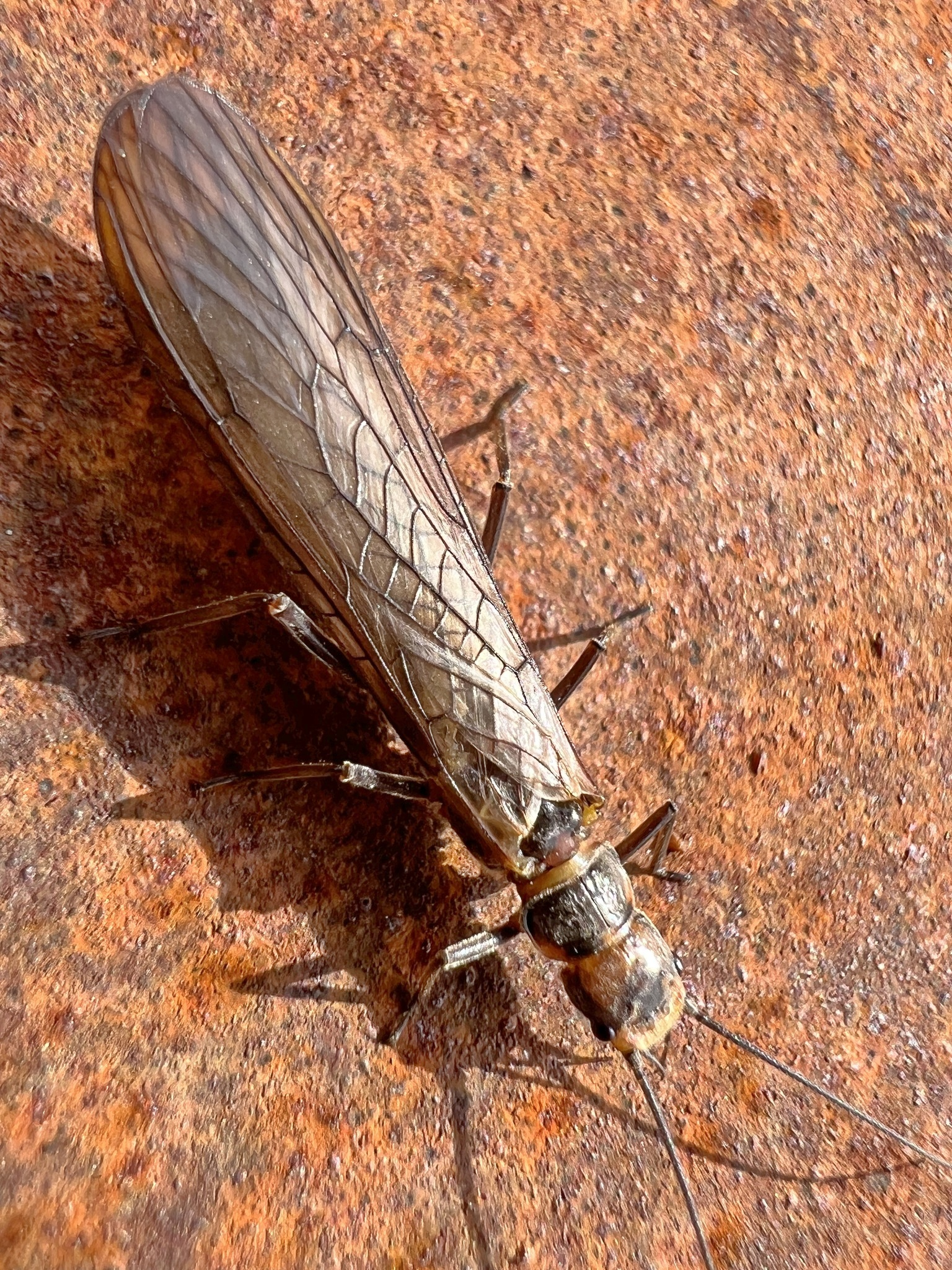
- Kathroperla perdita

Scientific classification
- Domain: Eukaryota
- Kingdom: Animalia
- Phylum: Arthropoda
- Class: Insecta
- Order: Plecoptera
- Family: Kathroperlidae
- Genus: Kathroperla; Banks, 1920

= Kathroperla =

Genus of stoneflies

Kathroperla is a genus of green stoneflies in the family Chloroperlidae. There are at least four described species in Kathroperla.

== Species ==
These four species belong to the genus Kathroperla:

- Kathroperla doma Stark, 2010
- Kathroperla perdita Banks, 1920 (longhead sallfly)
- Kathroperla siskiyou Stark & Kondratieff, 2015
- Kathroperla takhoma Stark & Surdick, 1987 (slenderhead sallfly)
