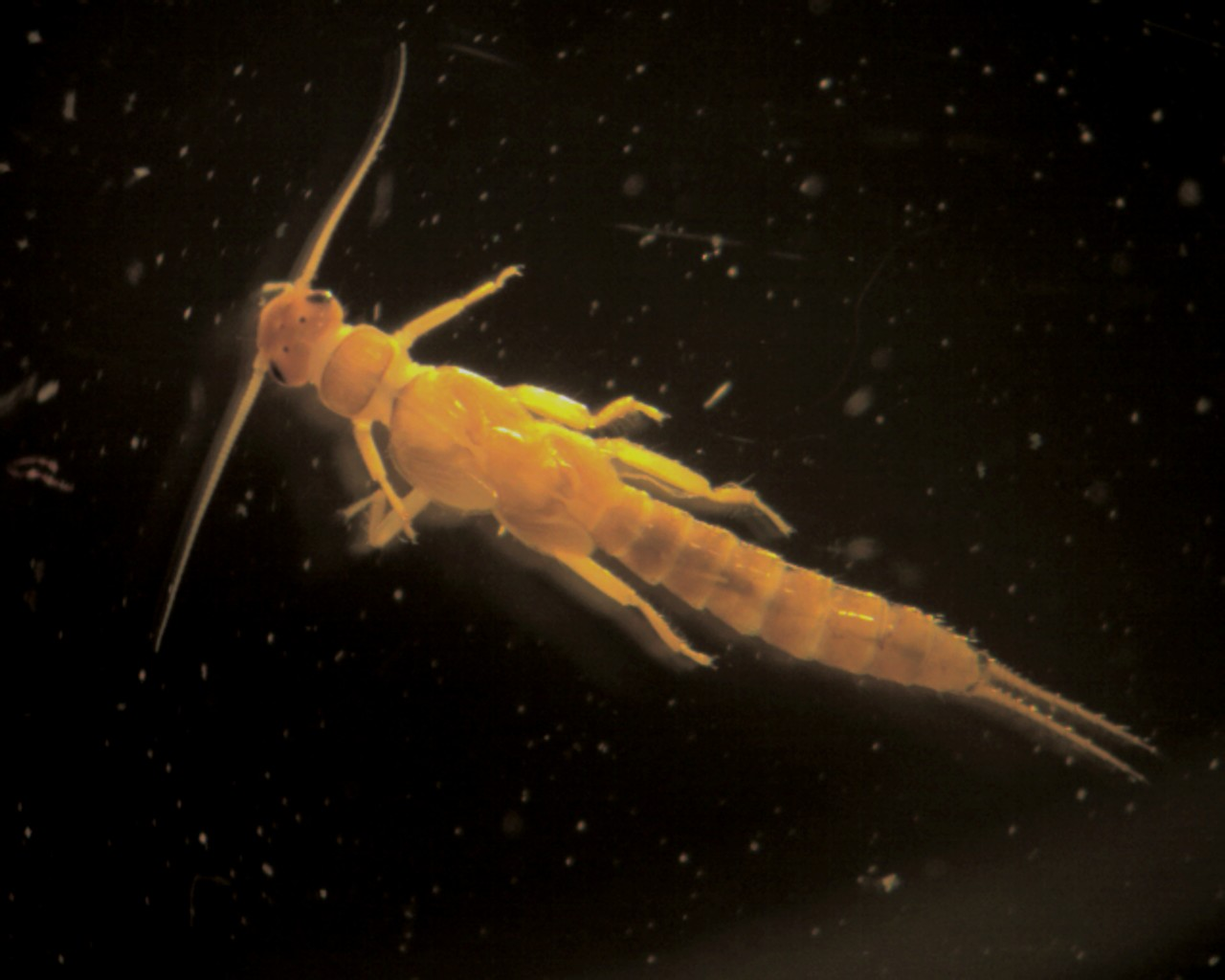
- An instar of Chloroperlidae
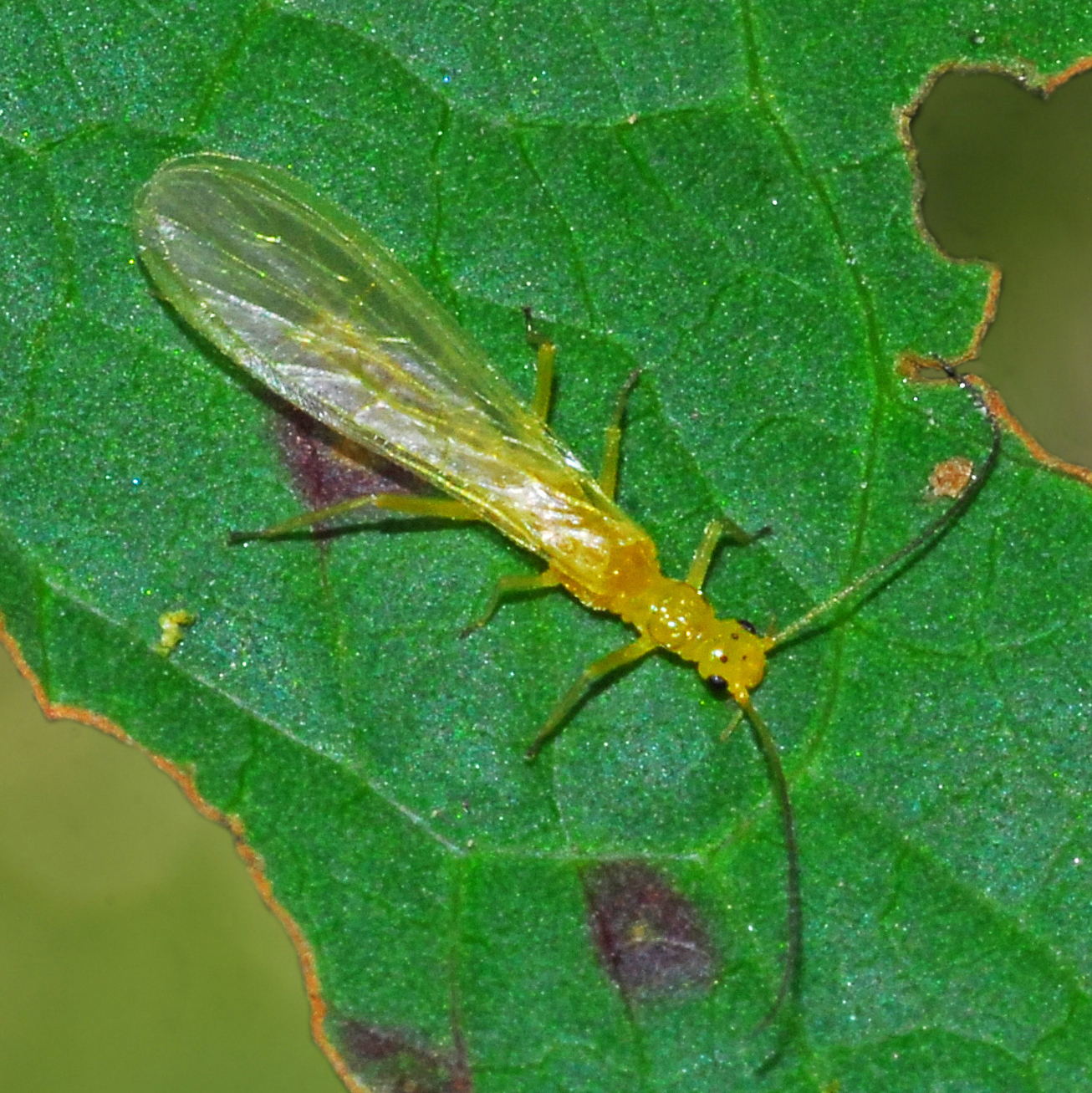
- Xanthoperla apicalis

Scientific classification
- Kingdom: Animalia
- Phylum: Arthropoda
- Clade: Pancrustacea
- Class: Insecta
- Order: Plecoptera
- Superfamily: Perloidea
- Family: Chloroperlidae; DeWalt, 2013

= Chloroperlidae =

Family of stoneflies

Chloroperlidae are a family of stoneflies, commonly known as green stoneflies, with more than 200 species and 22 genera. They appear green to yellow in colour, and are popularly used among fisherman as bait for trout fishing. Green stoneflies live in the benthic zone of the cold streams and rivers of five continents and four zoogeographical regions, emerging from the water to live in the riparian zone as adults. They are sensitive to pollutants, making them an indicator species for determining the quality of water bodies. Chloroperlidae are hemimetabolous, having no pupal stage, but instead hatch from eggs as nymphs and mature directly into adults. They are omnivorous, feeding on small organisms and plant particles, and become more carnivorous as they mature. The classification of Chloroperlidae is contested, with some believing that they should be considered as members of different orders, as opposed to the order Plecoptera that they currently belong to.

== Physical description ==
Chloroperlidae are defined mainly by the lack of distinct pigment patterns on the thorax, a relatively short cerci compared to the abdomen, slender labial palps, wings pads which are not divergent from the midline and short legs. Adult Chloroperlidae are typically yellowish green in coloration, which gives them their common name.

Insects in this family are small to medium-sized, ranging from 6 to 20 mm or 10 to 20 mm and have a distinct green colour for their wings, which gives the common name green stoneflies. They can also be yellow, and fly fishermen commonly refer to them as yellow sallflies or yellow sallies. Chloroperlidae undergo incomplete metamorphosis, only having three life stages (egg, nymph, and adult), but no pupal stage. In the nymph stage, they have almost-parallel hindwing pads to their brown to yellow body, short legs and cerci smaller than their abdomen. As they become adults, their body and wings become oval-shaped and can be somewhat green, yellow, or white.

== Taxonomy ==
Chloroperlidae is a family of stoneflies, typically referred to as green stoneflies, and is part of the order Plecoptera, splitting off into its lineage roughly 150 million years ago. This classification as a separate family was originally made in 1912. There is some contention about Chloroperlidae’s classification, however, with some arguing it is a subfamily within Perlidae, some arguing it is its own family within Perlomorpha, and others believing it is its own family within Perloidea. It is composed of more than 200 species.

Subfamilies & genera

Two subfamilies are included by the Plecoptera Species File:

=== Chloroperlinae ===
Authority: Okamoto, 1912

tribe Alloperlini Surdick, 1985

1. Alloperla Banks, 1906
2. Bisancora Surdick, 1981
3. Gaufinia Stark & Baumann, 2021
4. Sasquaperla Stark & Baumann, 2001
5. Sweltsa Ricker, 1943

tribe Chloroperlini Okamoto, 1912

1. Alaskaperla Stewart & DeWalt, 1991
2. Chloroperla Newman, 1836
3. Haploperla Navás, 1934
4. Isoptena Enderlein, 1909
5. Plesioperla Zwick, 1967
6. Plumiperla Surdick, 1985
7. Pontoperla Zwick, 1967
8. Rasvena Ricker, 1952
9. Siphonoperla Zwick, 1967
10. Triznaka Ricker, 1952
11. Xanthoperla Zwick, 1967

tribe Suwalliini Surdick, 1985

1. Suwallia Ricker, 1943

=== Paraperlinae ===
Authority: Ricker, 1943

1. Paraperla Banks, 1906
2. Utaperla Ricker, 1952

Note: Kathroperla is now placed in the monotypic family Kathroperlidae Banks, 1947.

=== Incertae sedis ===
†Dipsoperla Sinitshenkova, 1987

== Worldwide distribution ==
More than 200 species of the Chloroperlidae family are distributed predominantly in the Holarctic region. Nearly 80 species distributed among the Nearctic and East Palaearctic Regions are in the genera Sweltsa and Alloperla. Four genera and 19 species still exist in Europe.

Estimated Chloroperlidae species divided among continents are 95 in North America, 2 in Central America, 19 in Europe, 1 in Africa, and 89 in Asia. Estimated Chloroperlidae species by zoogeographical region are 20 in the Palaearctic Region, 95 in the Nearctic Region, 2 in the Neotropical Region, with a total species number of 206 in the World. Estimated Chloroperlidae genera by zoogeographical region are 14 in Palaearctic, 12 in Nearctic, 2 in Neotropical, 2 in Oriental, with a total genera number of 17 in the World.

== Habitat ==
Nymphs are aquatic and inhabit a wide variety of habitats, especially in the stony bottoms of cold mountain streams and/or lakes. The family Chloroperlidae is not very tolerant to pollutants, making them a good indicator species of very high water quality. Suwallia pallidula nymphs dwell in the hyporheic zone emerging only when are going to become winged adults. This shows the importance of the hyporheic zone prior to their emergence, but also the challenges for further research on early instars and voltinism. As winged adults, they migrate onto land where they dwell on rocks, debris, and plants near the water.

== Life cycle ==
Chloroperlidae are hemimetabolous (undergo incomplete metamorphosis), with no pupal stage and three life stages: egg, nymph, and adult.

The Chloroperlidae life cycle begins with an egg. Adult females deposit egg sacs containing fertilized eggs into a water body either by dropping the sac above the water body, releasing eggs from the banks of a water body, or by depositing egg sacs along the gravel substrate. If circumstances are unfavourable for hatching, the eggs may enter diapause for 3 to 12 months. Otherwise, the eggs may hatch within 2–3 weeks or a few months.

After the eggs hatch, the nymph stage of the cycle begins. Chloroperlidae nymphs reside in the benthic portions of the water body among and within the gravel and sediment. As the nymphs mature, they undergo 12-23 developmental stages, or instars, and progressively grow larger and more mature by shedding their exoskeleton. They also grow wing pads as they develop, which become functioning wings as adults. After approximately one year of development, the nymphs undergo their final moult and become adults, emerging from the water body in the spring or summer. Male Chloroperlidae mature faster, and therefore emerge earlier than females.

The objective for Chloroperlidae adults is to find a mate and reproduce. Most Chloroperlidae do not feed; their sole focus is mating. However, some species with longer adult stages do feed, to maintain enough energy to both evade predators and find a mate. To attract a mate, males land on a rock or piece of vegetation near the water and produce sounds by striking their abdomen against an object of their choice. The sound attracts nearby females of the same species, and an interested female will make the same sound back to the male. Once they locate each other, they mate, with the male depositing his sperm directly into the female's reproductive organs to fertilize her eggs. Mating Chloroperlidae are often found in swarms, clustered around vegetation near a water body. Chloroperlidae are polygynous, and males that emerge early are larger and more likely to be successful in reproducing with multiple females. After fertilization, the eggs are deposited in the nearest body of water. The flies then die soon after mating, as the adult stage of Chloroperlidae lasts only 1–4 weeks.

== Feeding strategies ==
Chloroperlidae consume food, but they are also an important food source for many fish and invertebrates in freshwater ecosystems.

=== Nymphs ===
Most nymph Chloroperlidae are omnivores with mostly fine particulate organic matter, coarse particulate organic matter, and unicellular organisms found in their gut content. However, as they mature, they typically become carnivores consuming chironomid midge, mayfly, caddisfly, and stonefly larvae. The mouths of carnivorous nymphs are usually for grasping and penetrating prey; however, mouths of herbivores are used for scraping and grinding. Specifically for Isoptena serricornis, the diet of the nymphs mostly contained detritus, unicellular organisms. For nymphs of intermediate or large size, Chironomidae larvae have also been consumed.

=== Adults ===
Although adults generally do not feed, predatory nymph species have been found to continue to feed actively as adults. Specifically for Isoptena serricornis, the diet of adults mostly contained pollen grains and some fungi, detritus and Cyanoprokaryota. Males typically have lower food content than female, suggesting that females had greater reproductive effort.
