= List of Neoperla species =

This is a list of 267 species in Neoperla, a genus of common stoneflies in the family Perlidae.

== Neoperla species ==
- Neoperla adamantea Murányi & Weihai Li, 2015^{c g}
- Neoperla aeripennis (Enderlein, 1909)^{c g}
- Neoperla aestiva Uchida, 1990^{c g}
- Neoperla affinis Zwick, P., 1983^{c g}
- Neoperla africana Klapálek, 1909^{c g}
- Neoperla agtouganon Sivec & Stark, 2011^{c g}
- Neoperla agumbe Stark & Sivec, 2015^{c g}
- Neoperla agusani Sivec, 1984^{c g}
- Neoperla alboguttata Zwick, P., 1986^{c g}
- Neoperla aliqua Zwick, P., 1973^{c g}
- Neoperla andreas Sivec & Stark, 2011^{c g}
- Neoperla angulata (Walker, F., 1852)^{c g}
- Neoperla angustilobata Zwick, P., 1988^{c g}
- Neoperla anjiensis Yang, D. & C. Yang, 1998^{c g}
- Neoperla asperata Zwick, P., 1988^{c g}
- Neoperla asperipenis Zwick, P., 1980^{c g}
- Neoperla atropennis Banks, 1924^{c g}
- Neoperla baisha Kong & Weihai Li, 2014^{c g}
- Neoperla baishuijiangensis Du, Y., 2005^{c g}
- Neoperla banksi Illies, 1966^{c g}
- Neoperla baotianmana Li, Weihai & R. Wang, 2011^{c g}
- Neoperla bicolor Yang, Juan, S. Zhang & Weihai Li, 2017^{c g}
- Neoperla bicornua Wu, C.F., 1973^{c g}
- Neoperla bicornuta Yang, D. & C. Yang, 1995^{c g}
- Neoperla bicoronata Zwick, P., 1986^{c g}
- Neoperla bicurvata Kong & Weihai Li, 2014^{c g}
- Neoperla bilineata Wu, C.F. & Claassen, 1934^{c g}
- Neoperla bilobata Zwick, P., 1986^{c g}
- Neoperla binodosa (Wu, C.F., 1973)^{c g}
- Neoperla biprojecta Du, Y., 2001^{c g}
- Neoperla biseriata Zwick, P. & Anbalagan, 2007^{c g}
- Neoperla bituberculata Du, Y., 2000^{c g}
- Neoperla borneensis (Enderlein, 1909)^{c g}
- Neoperla bredoana Navás, 1932^{c g}
- Neoperla breviscrotata Du, Y., 1999^{c g}
- Neoperla brevistyla Li, Weihai & Murányi, 2013^{c g}
- Neoperla caii Li, Weihai, Ying Wang & R. Wang, 2017^{c g}
- Neoperla caligata (Burmeister, 1839)^{c g}
- Neoperla cameronis Zwick, P., 1988^{c g}
- Neoperla carlsoni Stark and Baumann, 1978^{i c g}
- Neoperla catharae Stark and Baumann, 1978^{i c g}
- Neoperla cavaleriei (Navas, 1922)^{c g}
- Neoperla cavalerieri Navas^{g}
- Neoperla chebalinga Chen & Y. Du, 2016^{c g}
- Neoperla choctaw Stark and Baumann, 1978^{i c g}
- Neoperla chui Wu, C.F. & Claassen, 1934^{c g}
- Neoperla clara Stark & Sivec, 2008^{c g}
- Neoperla clymene (Newman, 1839)^{i c g b} (coastal stone)
- Neoperla connectens Zwick, P., 1986^{c g}
- Neoperla coosa Smith & Stark, 1998^{i c g b} (coosa stone)
- Neoperla coralliata Uchida, 1990^{c g}
- Neoperla coreensis Ra, Kim, Kang & Ham, 1994^{c g}
- Neoperla coronata Zwick, P., 1988^{c g}
- Neoperla costalis (Klapálek, 1913)^{c g}
- Neoperla coxi Stark, 1995^{i c g}
- Neoperla curvispina Wu, C.F., 1948^{c g}
- Neoperla daklak Stark & Sivec, 2008^{c g}
- Neoperla dao Stark & Sivec, 2008^{c g}
- Neoperla darlingi Stark & Sivec, 2007^{c g}
- Neoperla dashahena Du, Y., 2005^{c g}
- Neoperla dayak Zwick, P., 1986^{c g}
- Neoperla dentata Sivec, 1984^{c g}
- Neoperla diehli Sivec, 1985^{c g}
- Neoperla distincta Zwick, P., 1983^{c g}
- Neoperla divergens Zwick, P., 1986^{c g}
- Neoperla dolichocephala Klapálek, 1909^{c g}
- Neoperla dorsispina Yang, D. & C. Yang, 1996^{c g}
- Neoperla duratubulata Du, Y., 1999^{c g}
- Neoperla edmundsi Stark, 1983^{c g}
- Neoperla emarginata Stark & Sivec, 2015^{c g}
- Neoperla emeishana Li, Weihai, Ying Wang & R. Wang, 2017^{c g}
- Neoperla erecta Stark & Sivec, 2008^{c g}
- Neoperla falayah Stark and Lentz, 1988^{i c g}
- Neoperla fallax Klapálek, 1910^{c g}
- Neoperla fanjingshana Yang, D. & Jikun Yang, 1992^{c g}
- Neoperla flagellata Li, Weihai & Murányi, 2012^{c g}
- Neoperla flavescens Chu, 1929^{c g}
- Neoperla flavicincta Zwick, P., 1985^{c g}
- Neoperla flexiscrotata Du, Y., 2000^{c g}
- Neoperla flinti Sivec, 1984^{c g}
- Neoperla forcipata Yang, D. & Jikun Yang, 1992^{c g}
- Neoperla formosana Okamoto, 1912^{c g}
- Neoperla foveolata Klapálek, 1921^{c g}
- Neoperla furcata Zwick, P., 1986^{c g}
- Neoperla furcifera Klapálek, 1909^{c g}
- Neoperla furcomaculata Kong & Weihai Li, 2016^{c g}
- Neoperla furcostyla Li, Weihai & Qin, 2013^{c g}
- Neoperla gaufini Stark and Baumann, 1978^{i c g}
- Neoperla geniculata (Pictet, F.J., 1841)^{c g}
- Neoperla geniculatella Okamoto, 1912^{c g}
- Neoperla goguryeo Murányi & Weihai Li, 2015^{c g}
- Neoperla gordonae Stark, 1983^{c g}
- Neoperla grafei Stark & Sheldon, 2009^{c g}
- Neoperla guangxiensis Du, Y. & Sivec, 2004^{c g}
- Neoperla hainanensis Yang, D. & C. Yang, 1995^{c g}
- Neoperla hamata Jewett, 1975^{c g}
- Neoperla han Stark, 1987^{c g}
- Neoperla harina Navás, 1929^{c g}
- Neoperla harperi Zwick, P., 1980^{c g}
- Neoperla harpi Ernst and Stewart, 1986^{i c g}
- Neoperla harrisi Stark and Lentz, 1988^{i c g}
- Neoperla hatakeyamae Okamoto, 1912^{c g}
- Neoperla henana Li, Weihai, L. Wu & H. Zhang, 2011^{c g}
- Neoperla hermosa Banks, 1924^{c g}
- Neoperla hoabinhica Navás, 1932^{c g}
- Neoperla hubbsi Ricker, 1952^{c g}
- Neoperla hubeiensis Li, Weihai & G. Wang, 2012^{c g}
- Neoperla hubleyi Stark & Sivec, 2008^{c g}
- Neoperla idella Stark & Sivec, 2008^{c g}
- Neoperla ignacsiveci Li, Weihai & X. Li, 2013^{c g}
- Neoperla illiesi Zwick, P., 1983^{c g}
- Neoperla indica Needham, 1909^{c g}
- Neoperla inexspectata Zwick, P., 1980^{c g}
- Neoperla infuscata Wu, C.F., 1935^{c g}
- Neoperla jacobsoni Klapálek, 1910^{c g}
- Neoperla jewetti Sivec, 1984^{c g}
- Neoperla jiangsuensis Chen & Y. Du, 2015^{c g}
- Neoperla jigongshana Li & Li^{g}
- Neoperla jigonshana Li, Weihai & S. Li, 2014^{c g}
- Neoperla katmanduana Harper, P.P., 1977^{c g}
- Neoperla klapaleki Banks, 1937^{c g}
- Neoperla kunenensis (Barnard, 1934)^{c g}
- Neoperla lahu Stark, 1983^{c g}
- Neoperla laotica Zwick, P., 1988^{c g}
- Neoperla latamaculata Du, Y., 2005^{c g}
- Neoperla latispina Wang, G. & Weihai Li, 2013^{c g}
- Neoperla leigongshana Du, Y. & Z. Wang, 2007^{c g}
- Neoperla leptacantha Stark & Sivec, 2008^{c g}
- Neoperla leptophallus Zwick, P., 1988^{c g}
- Neoperla leroiana Klapálek, 1911^{c g}
- Neoperla lieftincki Zwick, P., 1983^{c g}
- Neoperla lihuae Li, Weihai & Murányi, 2014^{c g}
- Neoperla lii Du, Y., 1999^{c g}
- Neoperla limbatella Navás, 1933^{c g}
- Neoperla longispina Wu, C.F., 1937^{c g}
- Neoperla longwangshana Yang, D. & C. Yang, 1998^{c g}
- Neoperla lui Du, Y. & Sivec, 2004^{c g}
- Neoperla lushana Wu, C.F., 1935^{c g}
- Neoperla luteola (Burmeister, 1839)^{c g}
- Neoperla magisterchoui Du, Y., 2000^{c g}
- Neoperla mainensis Banks, 1948^{i c g b} (Maine stone)
- Neoperla malleus Zwick, P., 1988^{c g}
- Neoperla maolanensis Yang, D. & Jikun Yang, 1993^{c g}
- Neoperla melanocephala Navás, 1931^{c g}
- Neoperla mesospina Li, Weihai & G. Wang, 2013^{c g}
- Neoperla mesostyla Li, Weihai & G. Wang, 2013^{c g}
- Neoperla microtumida Wu, C.F. & Claassen, 1934^{c g}
- Neoperla mindoroensis Pelingen AL, Freitag H, 2020
- Neoperla minor Chu, 1929^{c g}
- Neoperla minuta Du, Y. & Chen, 2016^{c g}
- Neoperla mnong Stark, 1987^{c g}
- Neoperla moesta Banks, 1939^{c g}
- Neoperla monacha Stark & Sivec, 2008^{c g}
- Neoperla montivaga Zwick, P., 1977^{c g}
- Neoperla multilobata Zwick, P., 1986^{c g}
- Neoperla multispinosa Stark & Sivec, 2008^{c g}
- Neoperla muranyi Yang, Juan, S. Zhang & Weihai Li, 2017^{c g}
- Neoperla naviculata Klapálek, 1909^{c g}
- Neoperla nebulosa Stark & Sivec, 2008^{c g}
- Neoperla nigra Sivec, 1984^{c g}
- Neoperla nigromarginata Li, Weihai & S. Q. Zhang, 2014^{c g}
- Neoperla niponensis (McLachlan, 1875)^{c g}
- Neoperla nishidai Sivec, 1984^{c g}
- Neoperla nitida Kimmins, 1950^{c g}
- Neoperla nova Zwick, P., 1988^{c g}
- Neoperla obliqua Banks, 1913^{c g}
- Neoperla obscura Zwick, P., 1981^{c g}
- Neoperla obscurofulva (Wu, C.F., 1962)^{c g}
- Neoperla occipitalis (Pictet, 1841)^{i c g}
- Neoperla ochracea Zwick, P., 1981^{c g}
- Neoperla oculata Banks, 1924^{c g}
- Neoperla orissa Stark & Sivec, 2015^{c g}
- Neoperla osage Stark and Lentz, 1988^{i c g}
- Neoperla palawan Sivec & Stark, 2011^{c g}
- Neoperla pallescens Banks, 1937^{c g}
- Neoperla pallicornis Banks, 1937^{c g}
- Neoperla pani Chen & Y. Du, 2016^{c g}
- Neoperla parva Banks, 1939^{c g}
- Neoperla paucispinosa Zwick, P., 1986^{c g}
- Neoperla perspicillata Zwick, P., 1980^{c g}
- Neoperla peterzwicki Stark & Sivec, 2008^{c g}
- Neoperla philippina Sivec, 1984^{c g}
- Neoperla pilosella Klapalek, 1905^{c g}
- Neoperla pluvia Uchida, 1990^{c g}
- Neoperla primitiva Geijskes, 1952^{c g}
- Neoperla propinqua Zwick, P., 1983^{c g}
- Neoperla pseudorecta Sivec, 1984^{c g}
- Neoperla punan Zwick, P., 1986^{c g}
- Neoperla qinglingensis Du, Y., 2005^{c g}
- Neoperla qingyuanensis Yang, D. & C. Yang, 1995^{c g}
- Neoperla quadrata Wu, C.F. & Claassen, 1934^{c g}
- Neoperla ramosa (Navás, 1919)^{c g}
- Neoperla recta Banks, 1913^{c g}
- Neoperla reticulata Zwick, P., 1986^{c g}
- Neoperla rigidipenis Zwick, P., 1983^{c g}
- Neoperla robisoni Poulton and Stewart, 1986^{i c g}
- Neoperla rotunda Wu, C.F., 1948^{c g}
- Neoperla rougemonti Zwick, P., 1986^{c g}
- Neoperla sabah Zwick, P., 1986^{c g}
- Neoperla sabang Sivec & Stark, 2011^{c g}
- Neoperla salakot Sivec & Stark, 2011^{c g}
- Neoperla saraburi Zwick, P., 1988^{c g}
- Neoperla sarawak Zwick, P., 1986^{c g}
- Neoperla sauteri Klapálek, 1912^{c g}
- Neoperla schlitz Stark & Sivec, 2008^{c g}
- Neoperla schmidi Aubert, 1959^{c g}
- Neoperla schmidiana Zwick, P., 1981^{c g}
- Neoperla securifera Zwick, P., 1986^{c g}
- Neoperla separanda Zwick, P., 1983^{c g}
- Neoperla seriespinosa Zwick, P., 1986^{c g}
- Neoperla serrata Zwick, P., 1988^{c g}
- Neoperla sexlobata Chen & Y. Du, 2016^{c g}
- Neoperla signatalis Banks, 1937^{c g}
- Neoperla silvaeae Zwick, P., 1986^{c g}
- Neoperla similidella Li, Weihai & G. Wang, 2013^{c g}
- Neoperla similiflavescens Li, Weihai & S. Q. Zhang, 2014^{c g}
- Neoperla similiserecta Wang, G. & Weihai Li, 2012^{c g}
- Neoperla simplicior Navás, 1932^{c g}
- Neoperla sinensis Chu, 1928^{c g}
- Neoperla sinuata Stark & Sivec, 2008^{c g}
- Neoperla sitahoanensis Sivec, 1985^{c g}
- Neoperla siveci Zwick, P., 1980^{c g}
- Neoperla song Stark & Sivec, 2008^{c g}
- Neoperla spinaloba Stark & Sivec, 2008^{c g}
- Neoperla spinosa Zwick, P., 1986^{c g}
- Neoperla spio (Newman, 1839)^{c g}
- Neoperla starki Zwick, P., 1986^{c g}
- Neoperla stewarti Stark and Baumann, 1978^{i c g}
- Neoperla stueberae Zwick, P., 1983^{c g}
- Neoperla sumatrana (Enderlein, 1909)^{c g}
- Neoperla sungi Cao, T.K.T. & Bae, 2007^{c g}
- Neoperla tadpolata Li & Muranyi^{g}
- Neoperla taibaina Du, Y., 2005^{c g}
- Neoperla taihorinensis (Klapálek, 1913)^{c g}
- Neoperla taiwanica Sivec & P. Zwick, 1987^{c g}
- Neoperla tamdao Cao, T.K.T. & Bae, 2007^{c g}
- Neoperla tenuispina Klapálek, 1921^{c g}
- Neoperla teresa Stark & Sivec, 2008^{c g}
- Neoperla tetrapoda Zwick, P., 1986^{c g}
- Neoperla thai Stark, 1983^{c g}
- Neoperla theobromae Zwick, P., 1986^{c g}
- Neoperla tingwushanensis Wu, C.F., 1935^{c g}
- Neoperla tortipenis Zwick, P., 1980^{c g}
- Neoperla transversprojecta Du, Y. & Sivec, 2004^{c g}
- Neoperla triangulata Kawai, 1975^{c g}
- Neoperla truncata Wu, C.F., 1948^{c g}
- Neoperla tuberculata Wu, C.F., 1937^{c g}
- Neoperla unicolor Zwick, P., 1986^{c g}
- Neoperla uniformis Banks, 1937^{c g}
- Neoperla ussurica Sivec & Zhiltzova, 1996^{c g}
- Neoperla vallis Uchida, 1990^{c g}
- Neoperla variegata Klapálek, 1909^{c g}
- Neoperla venosa Kimmins, 1950^{c g}
- Neoperla verna Uchida, 1990^{c g}
- Neoperla vesperi Zwick, P., 1983^{c g}
- Neoperla wagneri Sivec, 1984^{c g}
- Neoperla wui Yang, C. & D. Yang, 1990^{c g}
- Neoperla wuzhishana Chen & Y. Du, 2016^{c g}
- Neoperla xuansongae Li, Weihai & Wenliang Li, 2013^{c g}
- Neoperla yanlii Li, Weihai & R. Wang, 2014^{c g}
- Neoperla yao Stark, 1987^{c g}
- Neoperla yaoshana Li, Weihai, H. Wang & W. Lu, 2011^{c g}
- Neoperla yentu Cao, T.K.T. & Bae, 2007^{c g}
- Neoperla yingshana Chen & Du, 2017^{g}
- Neoperla yunnana Li & Wang^{g}
- Neoperla zhiltzovae Teslenko, 2012^{c g}
- Neoperla zonata Stark & Sivec, 2008^{c g}
- Neoperla zwicki Sivec, 1984^{c g}

Data sources: i = ITIS, c = Catalogue of Life, g = GBIF, b = Bugguide.net
