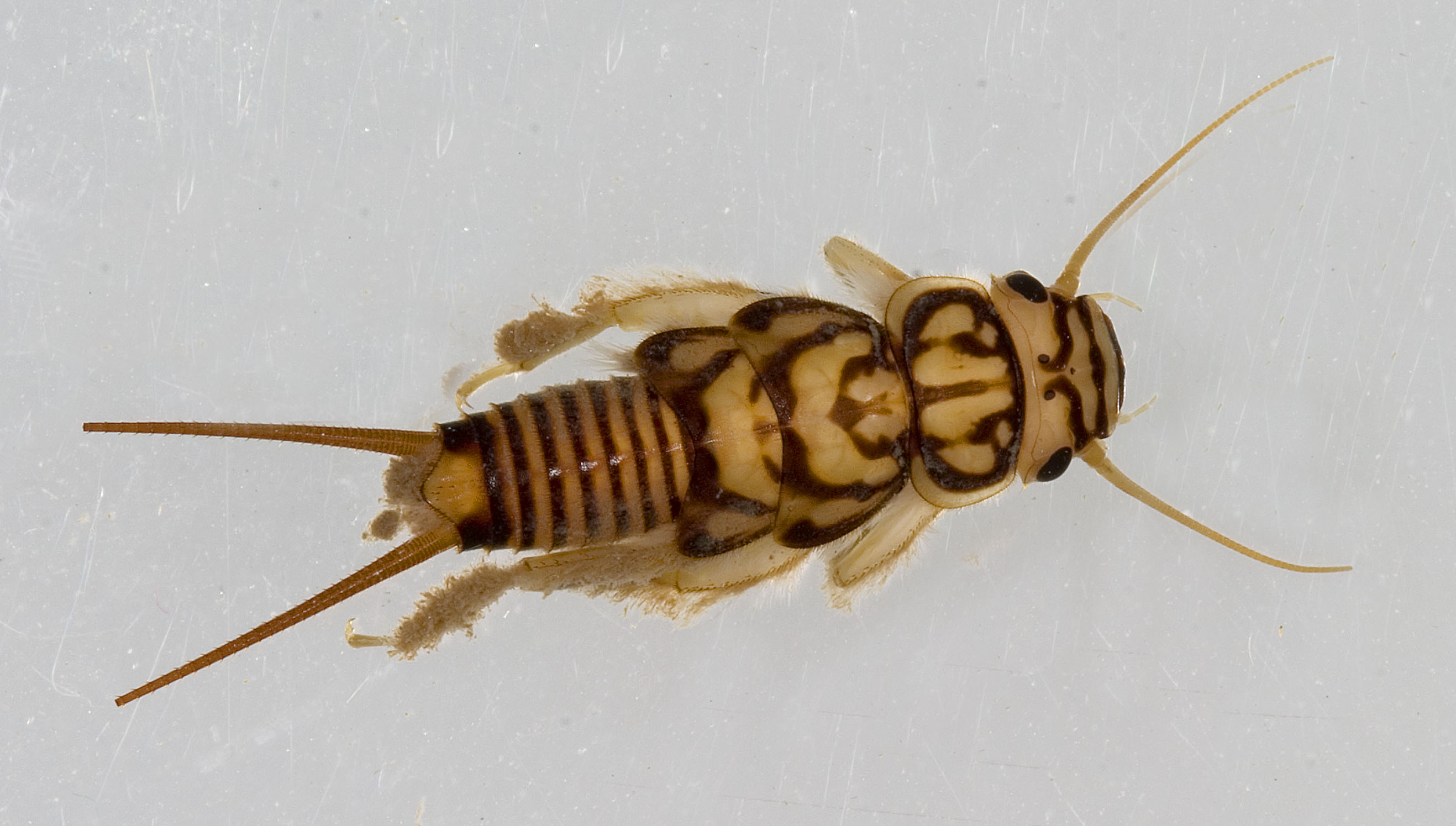

Scientific classification
- Domain: Eukaryota
- Kingdom: Animalia
- Phylum: Arthropoda
- Class: Insecta
- Order: Plecoptera
- Family: Perlidae
- Tribe: Perlini
- Genus: Agnetina
- Species: A. capitata

Binomial name
- Agnetina capitata (Pictet, 1841)

= Agnetina capitata =

Species of stonefly

Agnetina capitata, the northern stone, is a species of common stonefly in the family Perlidae. It is found in North America.
