= Neoperla clymene =

Scientific classification
- Domain: Eukaryota
- Kingdom: Animalia
- Phylum: Arthropoda
- Class: Insecta
- Order: Plecoptera
- Family: Perlidae
- Subfamily: Perlinae
- Genus: Neoperla
- Species: N. clymene

Binomial name
- Neoperla clymene (Newman, 1839)

Species of stonefly

Neoperla clymene, the coastal stone, is a species of common stonefly in the family Perlidae. It is found in North America.
