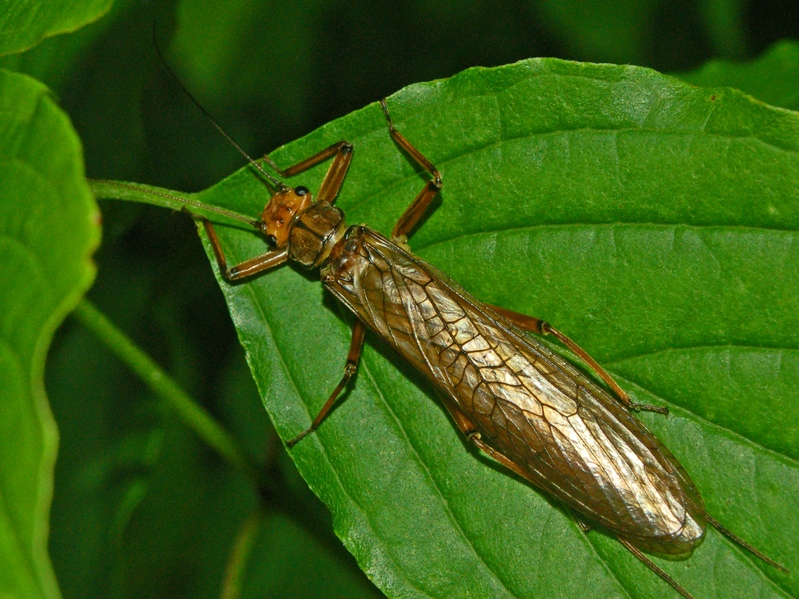
- Dinocras ferreri, dorsal view
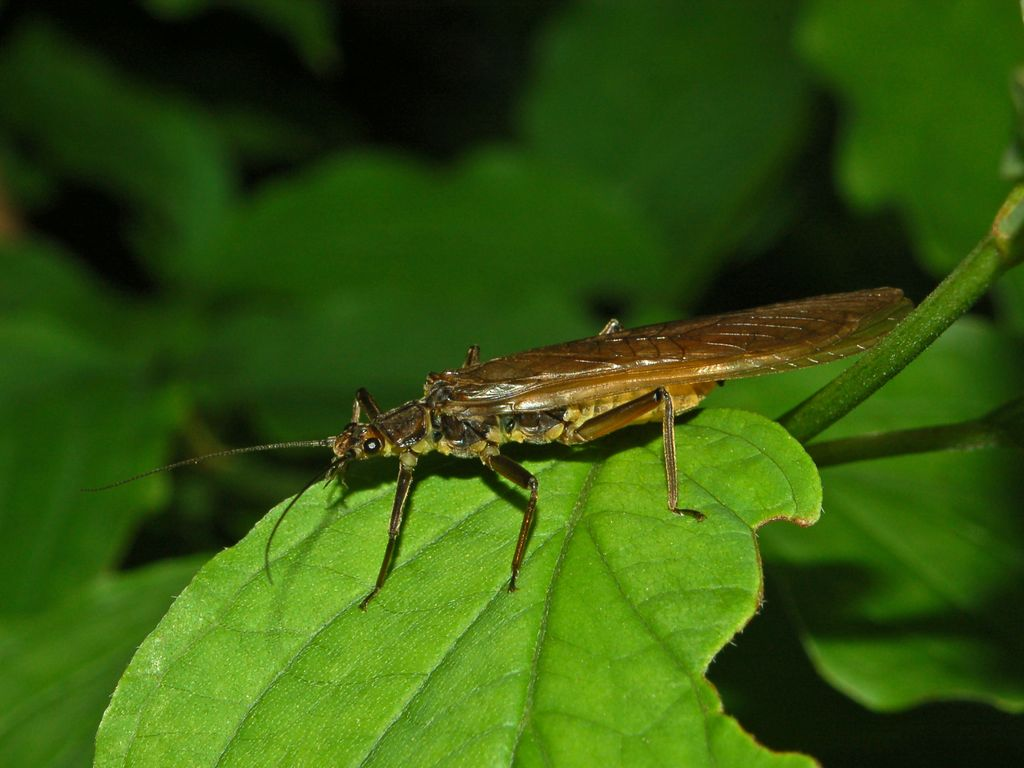
- Side view

Scientific classification
- Kingdom: Animalia
- Phylum: Arthropoda
- Clade: Pancrustacea
- Class: Insecta
- Order: Plecoptera
- Family: Perlidae
- Genus: Dinocras
- Species: D. ferreri

Binomial name
- Dinocras ferreri (Pictet, 1841)

Synonyms
- Dinocras domenchi (Navás, 1933); Perla ferreri (Pictet, 1841)

= Dinocras ferreri =

Species of insect

Dinocras ferreri is a species of stonefly belonging to the family Perlidae.

== Distribution ==
Dinocras ferreri is present in France, Italy, and Switzerland. The species is restricted to the southern edge of the Alps, and it can also be found in small parts of the northern Apennines.

== Description ==
Adults can reach approximately 40 millimetres (1.6 in) in length and can mainly be encountered in small waterways.

The basic coloration of the body is pale brown, including the head and legs. The wings are membranous and translucent, with evident brown veins. At rest they are folded over the body. The head has threadlike antennae and yellow spots on the sides. The abdomen is yellow, with two cerci.

Both sexes are winged, but the adults are bad fliers and never leave the running cold waters where the larvae develop. The flat larvae usually stay under rocks just emerging from the waters.

== Bibliography ==
- Aubert (1949) Plécoptères helvétiques. Notes faunistiques et zoogéographiques, Bull. Soc. Vaud. Sci. Nat. 64:321-360
- Illies (1966) Katalog der rezenten Plecoptera, Das Tierreich – Eine Zusammenstellung und Kennzeichnung der rezenten Tierformen. (Das Tierreich) 82:632
- Navás (1933) Insetti neurotteri e affini del Piemonte. Plecoptera., Memorie della Societa Entomologica Italiana (Mem. Soc. Entomol. Ital.) 12:150-162
- Pictet, F.J. (1841) Familie des Perlides, Histoire naturelle générale et particulière des insectes névroptères, J. Kessmann etc., Genève 1:1-423, 53 pl.
- Plecoptera SF: Plecoptera Species File. DeWalt R.E.; New-Becker U. & Stueber G.
- Walker (1852) Part I. Phryganides-Perlides., Catalogue of the specimens of neuropterous insects in the collection of the British museum, Edward Newman, London 1:1-192
