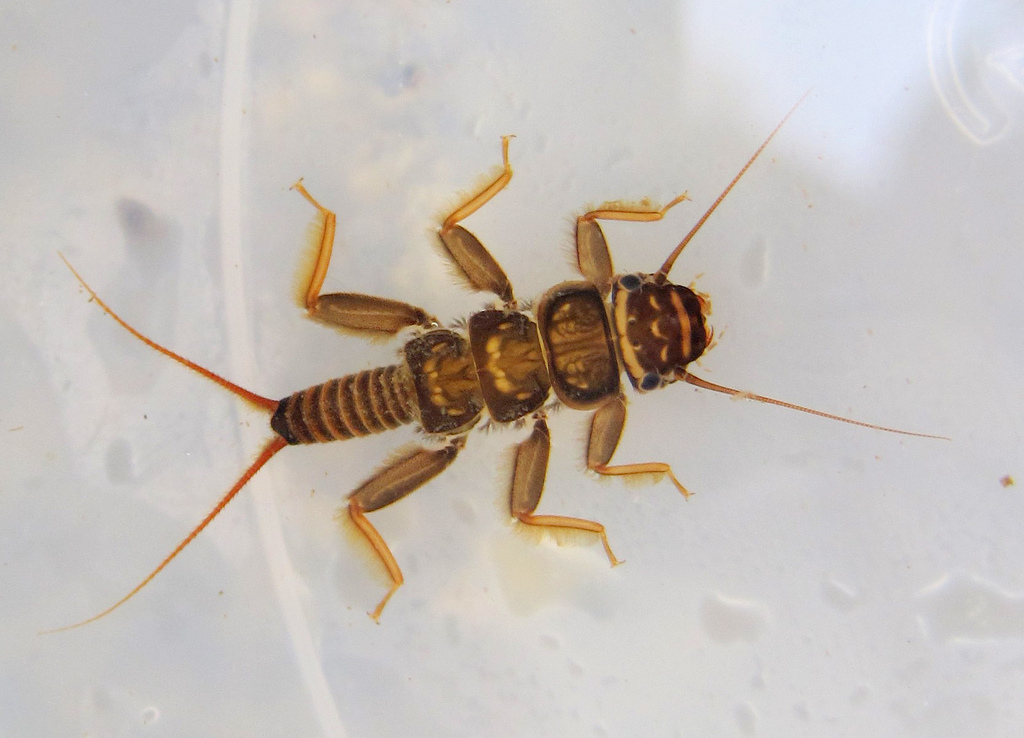

Scientific classification
- Domain: Eukaryota
- Kingdom: Animalia
- Phylum: Arthropoda
- Class: Insecta
- Order: Plecoptera
- Family: Perlidae
- Genus: Acroneuria
- Species: A. lycorias

Binomial name
- Acroneuria lycorias (Newman, 1839)

= Acroneuria lycorias =

Species of stonefly

Acroneuria lycorias or the boreal stonefly is a species of stonefly native to North America. It was first described by Edward Newman in 1839. The species is named after the Nereid Lycorias of Greek mythology.

The species is found in North America. It ranges from northern Quebec southwards through New England to Florida and westwards to Ontario, Manitoba, Saskatchewan, and Tennessee. In Alberta, the species is known from boreal streams. The insect frequents large cold water bodies and has a life cycle of three years. The nymphs are aquatic and carnivorous. While large stoneflies are not endangered, like all stoneflies, they are very sensitive to pollution.
