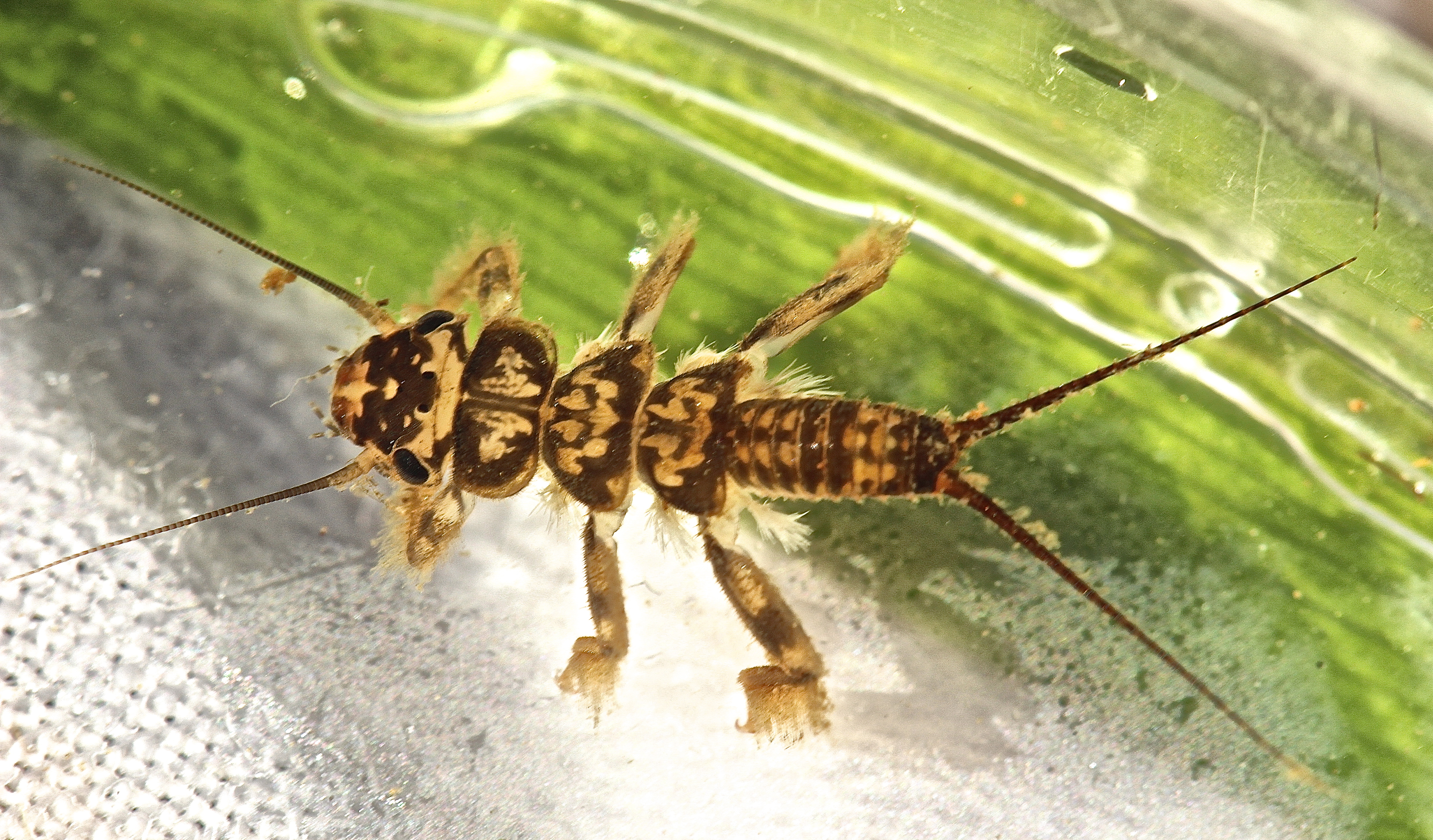

Scientific classification
- Domain: Eukaryota
- Kingdom: Animalia
- Phylum: Arthropoda
- Class: Insecta
- Order: Plecoptera
- Family: Perlidae
- Genus: Paragnetina
- Species: P. fumosa

Binomial name
- Paragnetina fumosa (Banks, 1902)

= Paragnetina fumosa =

Species of stonefly

Paragnetina fumosa, the smoky stone, is a species of common stonefly in the family Perlidae. It is found in North America.
