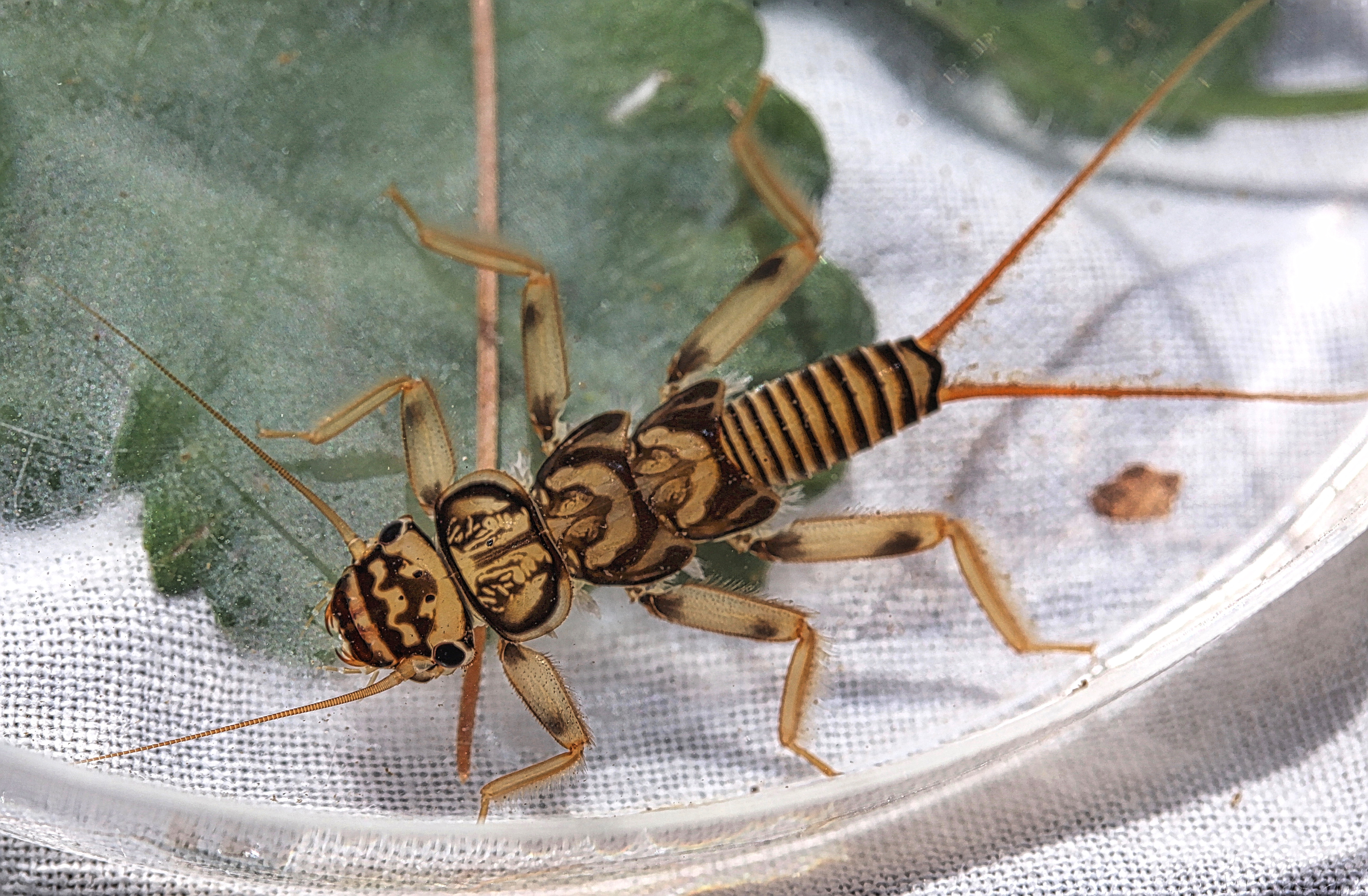

Scientific classification
- Domain: Eukaryota
- Kingdom: Animalia
- Phylum: Arthropoda
- Class: Insecta
- Order: Plecoptera
- Family: Perlidae
- Tribe: Acroneuriini
- Genus: Acroneuria
- Species: A. carolinensis

Binomial name
- Acroneuria carolinensis (Banks, 1905)

= Acroneuria carolinensis =

Species of stonefly

Acroneuria carolinensis, the Carolina stone, is a species of common stonefly in the family Perlidae. It is found in North America.

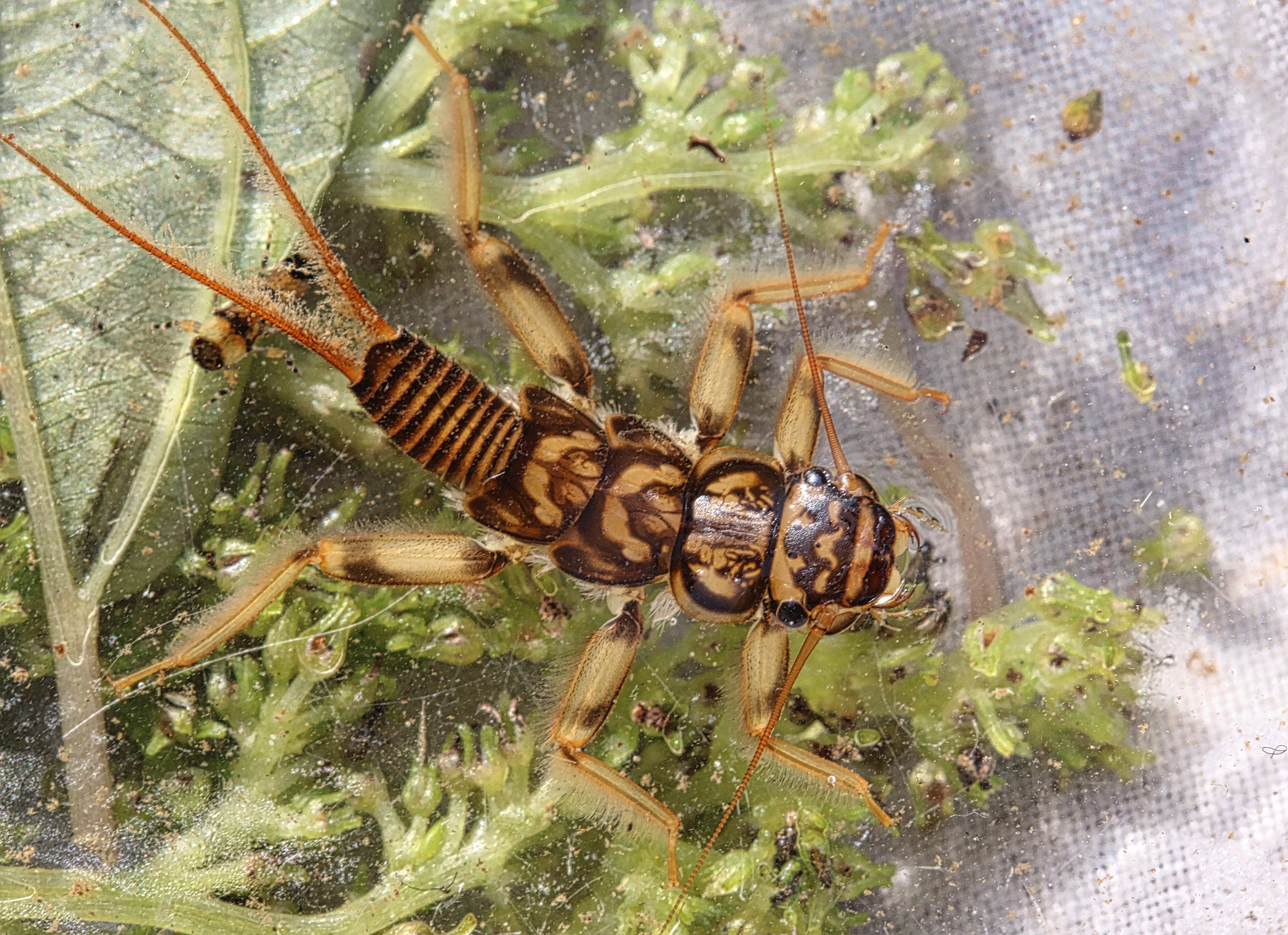
Carolina stone, Acroneuria carolinensis
