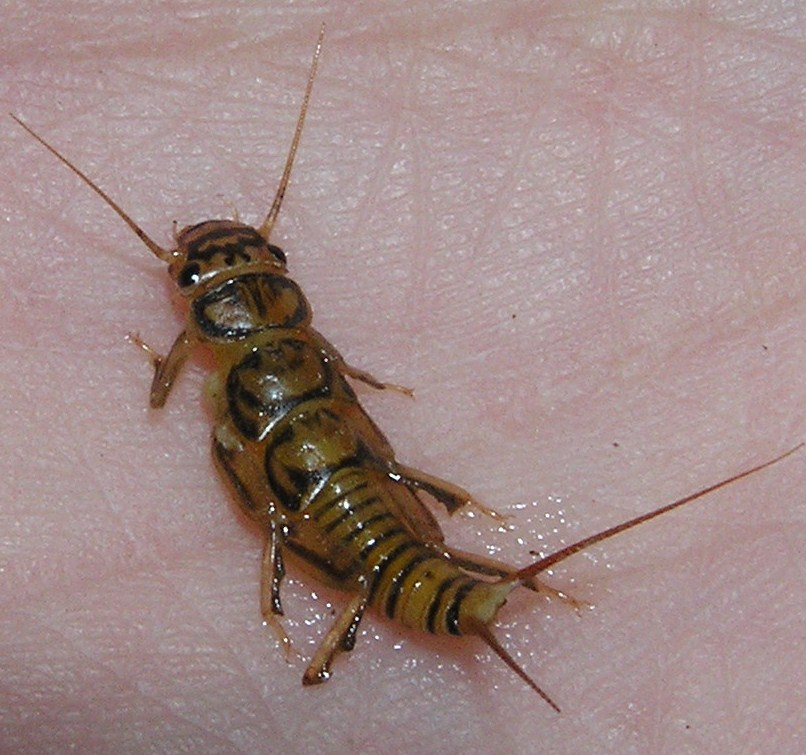

Scientific classification
- Domain: Eukaryota
- Kingdom: Animalia
- Phylum: Arthropoda
- Class: Insecta
- Order: Plecoptera
- Family: Perlidae
- Tribe: Perlini
- Genus: Agnetina
- Species: A. flavescens

Binomial name
- Agnetina flavescens (Walsh, 1862)

= Agnetina flavescens =

Species of stonefly

Agnetina flavescens, the midwestern stone, is a species of common stonefly in the family Perlidae. It is found in North America.
