= Acroneuria arenosa =

Scientific classification
- Domain: Eukaryota
- Kingdom: Animalia
- Phylum: Arthropoda
- Class: Insecta
- Order: Plecoptera
- Family: Perlidae
- Tribe: Acroneuriini
- Genus: Acroneuria
- Species: A. arenosa

Binomial name
- Acroneuria arenosa (Pictet, 1841)

Species of stonefly

Acroneuria arenosa, the eastern stone, is a species of common stonefly in the family Perlidae. It is found in North America.
