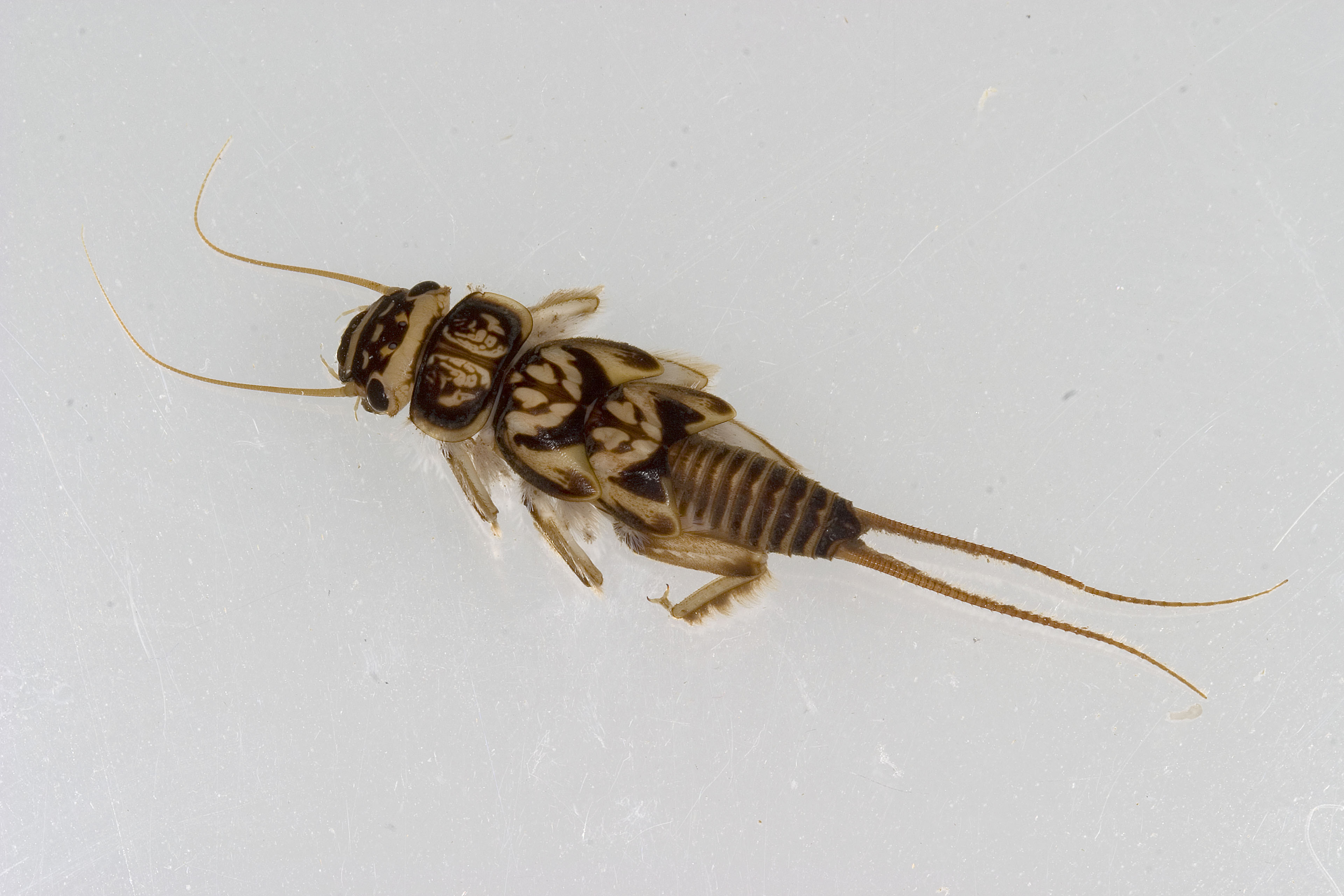

Scientific classification
- Domain: Eukaryota
- Kingdom: Animalia
- Phylum: Arthropoda
- Class: Insecta
- Order: Plecoptera
- Family: Perlidae
- Genus: Acroneuria
- Species: A. internata

Binomial name
- Acroneuria internata (Walker, 1852)

= Acroneuria internata =

Species of stonefly

Acroneuria internata is a species of stonefly in the family Perlidae. The scientific name of this species was first published 1852 by Walker.

This species is native to the United States.
