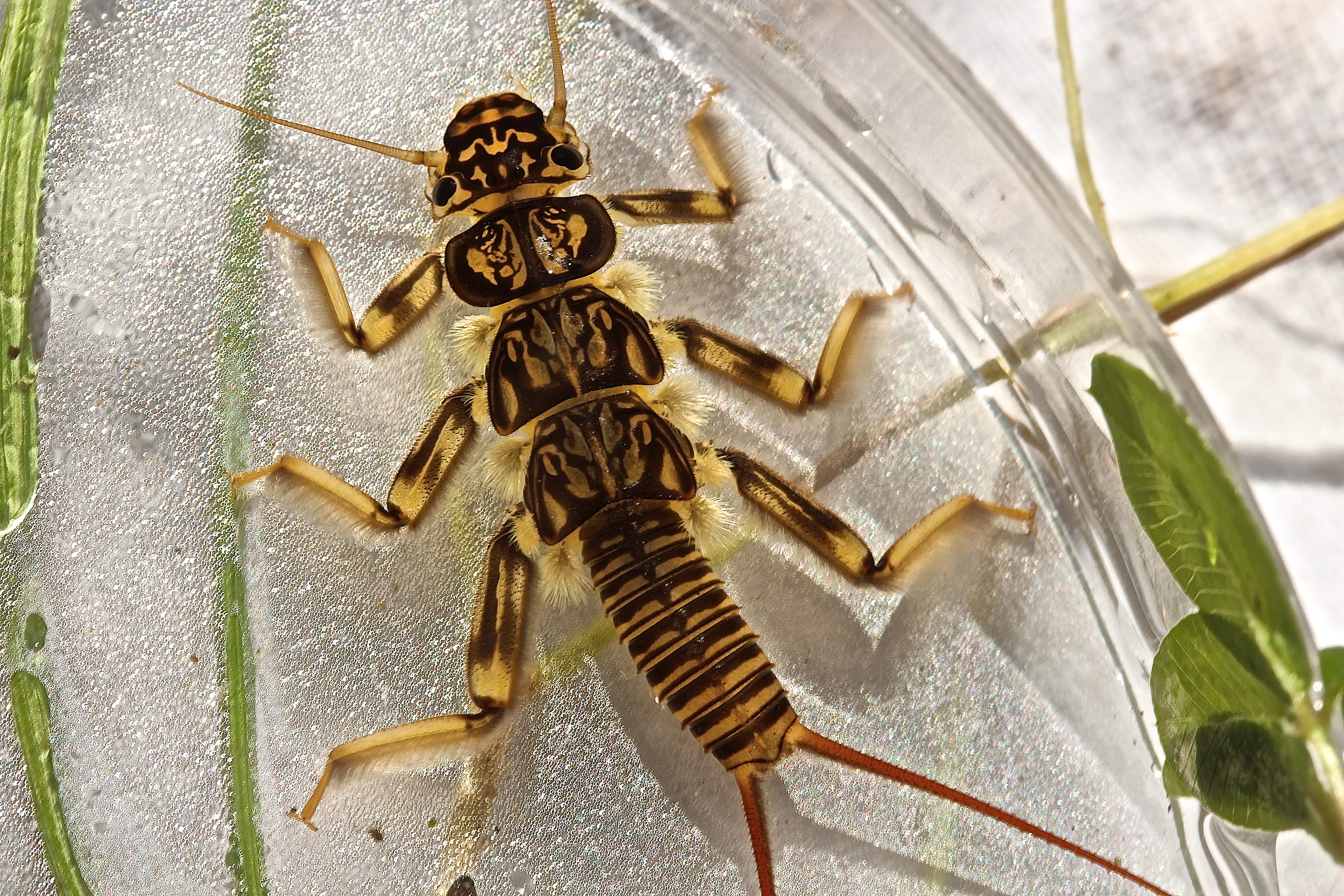

Scientific classification
- Domain: Eukaryota
- Kingdom: Animalia
- Phylum: Arthropoda
- Class: Insecta
- Order: Plecoptera
- Family: Perlidae
- Genus: Paragnetina
- Species: P. immarginata

Binomial name
- Paragnetina immarginata (Say, 1823)

= Paragnetina immarginata =

Species of stonefly

Paragnetina immarginata, the beautiful stone, is a species of common stonefly in the family Perlidae. It is found in North America.
