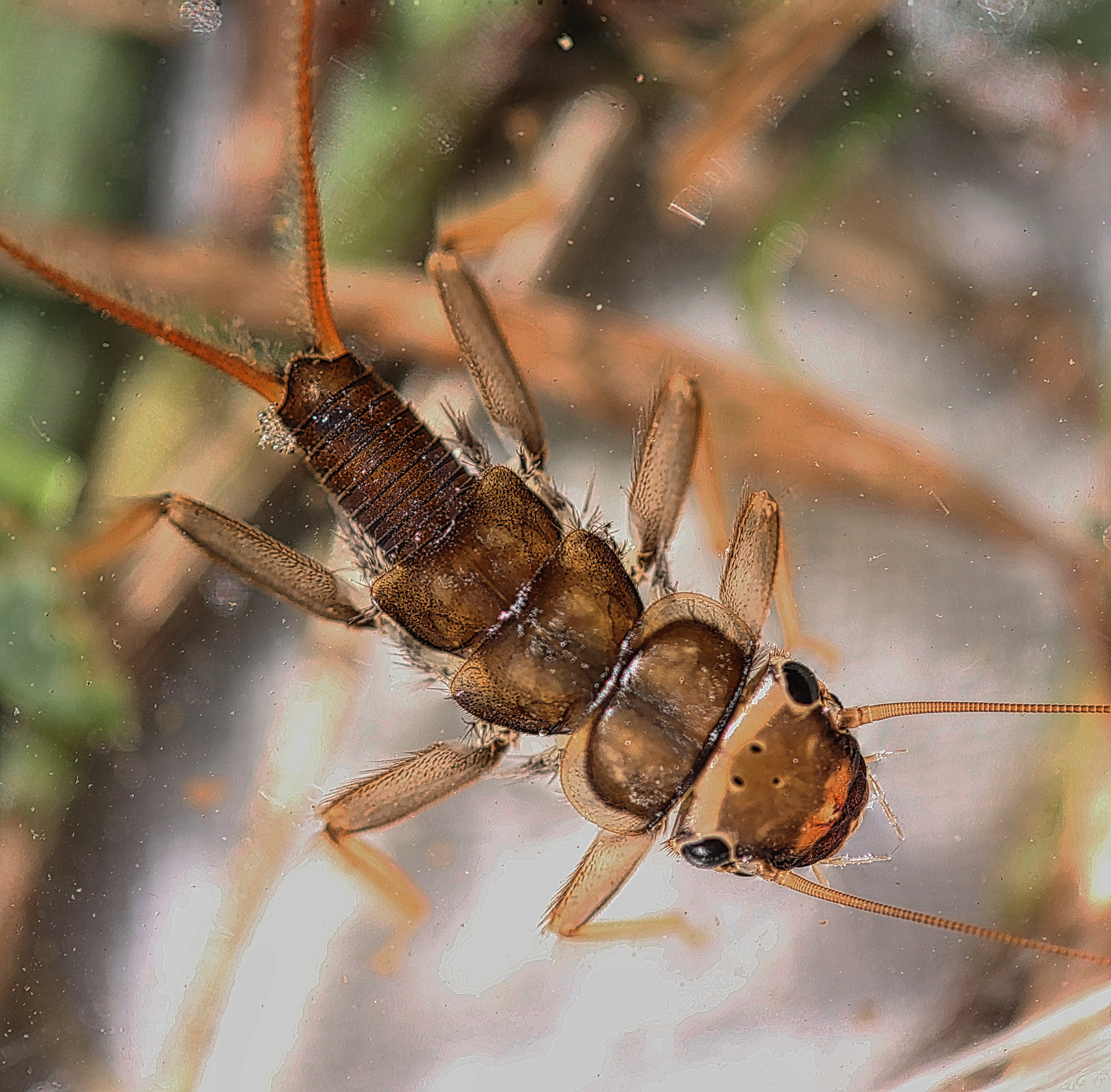

Scientific classification
- Domain: Eukaryota
- Kingdom: Animalia
- Phylum: Arthropoda
- Class: Insecta
- Order: Plecoptera
- Family: Perlidae
- Tribe: Acroneuriini
- Genus: Acroneuria
- Species: A. evoluta

Binomial name
- Acroneuria evoluta Klapálek, 1909

Synonyms
- Acroneuria mela Frison, 1942

= Acroneuria evoluta =

Species of stonefly

Acroneuria evoluta, the constricted stone, is a species of common stonefly in the family Perlidae. It is found in North America.
