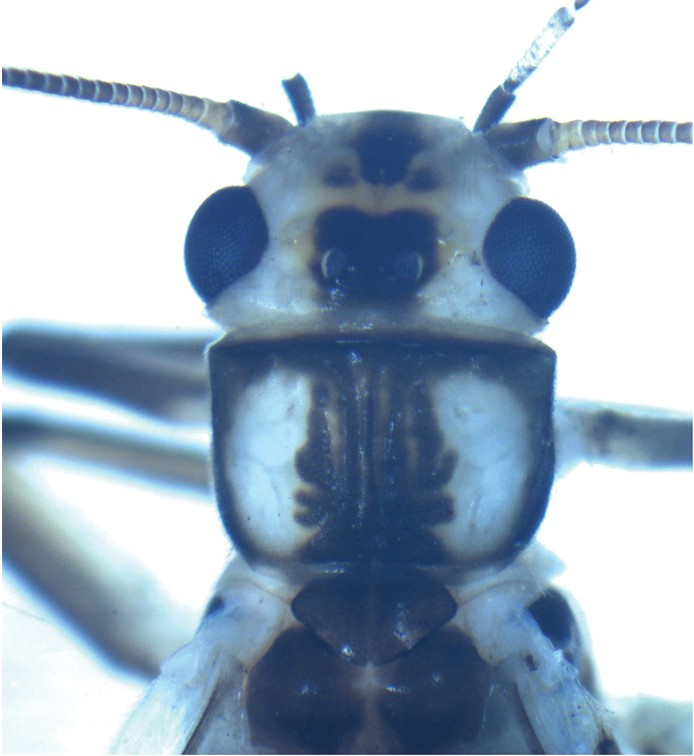

Scientific classification
- Domain: Eukaryota
- Kingdom: Animalia
- Phylum: Arthropoda
- Class: Insecta
- Order: Plecoptera
- Family: Perlidae
- Genus: Neoperla
- Species: N. nigromarginata

Binomial name
- Neoperla nigromarginata Li & Zhang, 2014

= Neoperla nigromarginata =

Species of stonefly

Neoperla nigromarginata is a species of stonefly native to the Henan province of China. The forewing measures 11.8 millimeters in males, and 13.4–14.0 millimeters in females. The head is pale yellow to brown with black markings. Legs and antennae are brown. The species name refers to the dark-colored margins of the pronotum. The species is similar in many aspects to Neoperla flagellate and N. tuberculata, but can be distinguished by the size of the aedeagus. The Aedeagal sac and tube are approximately the same length, with the sac being membranous and covered in numerous small spines. A pair of flagella are discernable at the sac's apex.
