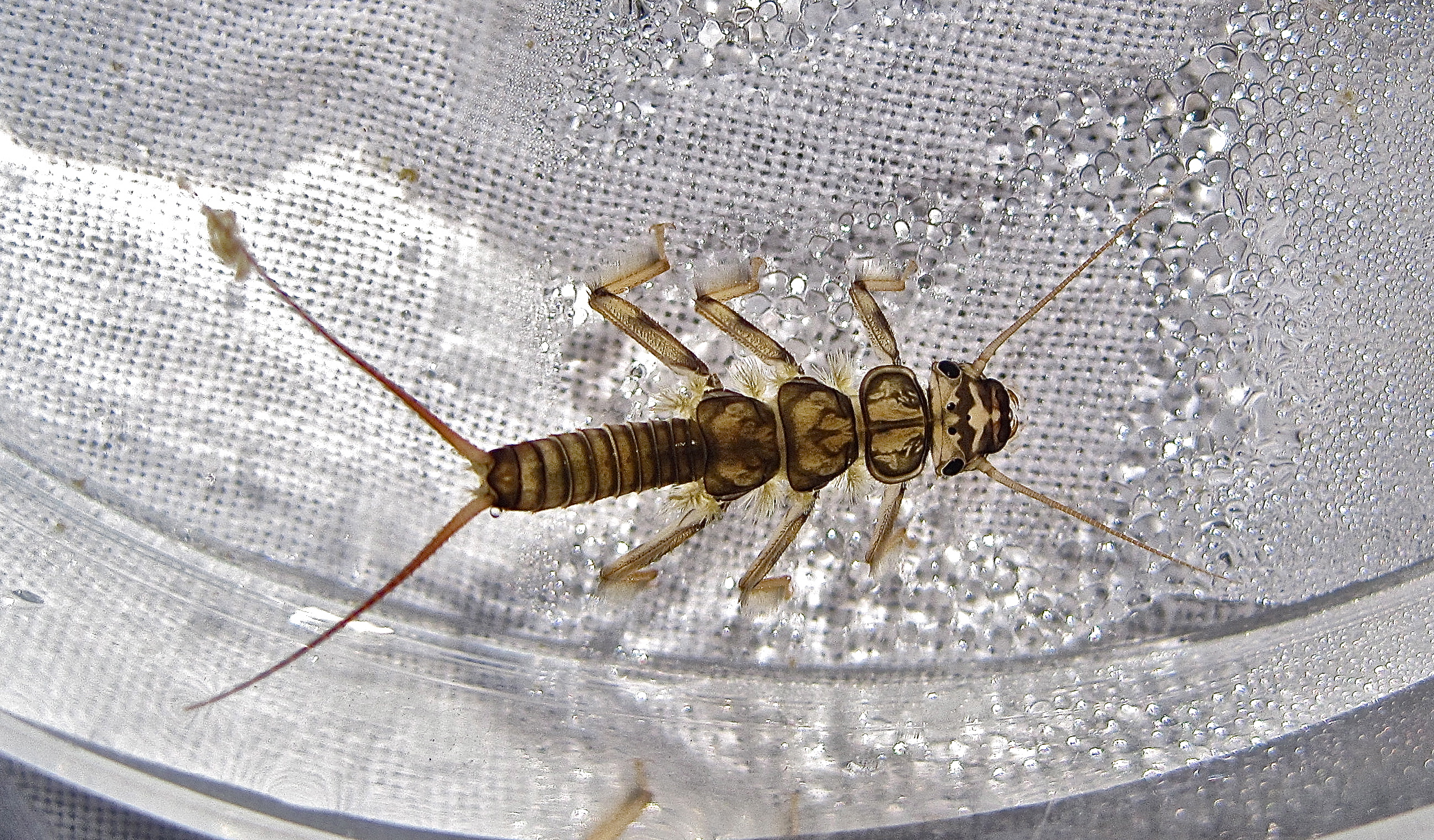

Scientific classification
- Domain: Eukaryota
- Kingdom: Animalia
- Phylum: Arthropoda
- Class: Insecta
- Order: Plecoptera
- Family: Perlidae
- Genus: Claassenia
- Species: C. sabulosa

Binomial name
- Claassenia sabulosa (Banks, 1900)

= Claassenia sabulosa =

Species of stonefly

Claassenia sabulosa, the short-wing stone, is a species of common stonefly in the family Perlidae. It is found in North America.
