= Neoperla darlingi =

Scientific classification
- Domain: Eukaryota
- Kingdom: Animalia
- Phylum: Arthropoda
- Class: Insecta
- Order: Plecoptera
- Family: Perlidae
- Genus: Neoperla
- Species: N. darlingi

Binomial name
- Neoperla darlingi Stark & Sivec, 2007

Species of stonefly

Neoperla darlingi is a species of insect in the family Perlidae. It is endemic to Borneo and is only known from an adult male specimen collected at Gunung Palung National Park. It has a yellow brown colour and a uniformly pale brown head; its wings are composed of a transparent membrane with brown venation and no distinctive markings. It was named after D.C. Darling, a curator of the Royal Ontario Museum who collected the holotype of this species.
