= Acroneuria arida =

Conservation status
- Vulnerable (NatureServe)

Scientific classification
- Domain: Eukaryota
- Kingdom: Animalia
- Phylum: Arthropoda
- Class: Insecta
- Order: Plecoptera
- Family: Perlidae
- Genus: Acroneuria
- Species: A. arida

Binomial name
- Acroneuria arida (Hagen, 1861)

Synonyms
- Perla arida Hagen, 1861; Perla vallida Banks, 1906

Species of stonefly

Acroneuria arida is a species of stonefly in the family Perlidae. It is relatively uncommon and found in northeastern locations in North America, namely regions in Canada and the United States. A. arida was first described in 1861 by German entomologist Hermann August Hagen.

== Distribution and conservation status ==
Acroneuria arida is found in the U.S. states of Pennsylvania, North Carolina, New Jersey, Georgia, and Tennessee; it is also found in the Canadian province of New Brunswick.

On a global scale, A. arida is considered vulnerable, however there is no official status rank in Pennsylvania and New Jersey, and it has been possibly extirpated from North Carolina. Throughout its 20,000-200,000 square kilometer (~12427-124274 square mile) range, A. arida occurs sporadically.

== Ecology and habitat ==
Acroneuria arida is considered a predacious insect and is found in both freshwater and terrestrial habitats.
