= Neoperla coosa =

Scientific classification
- Domain: Eukaryota
- Kingdom: Animalia
- Phylum: Arthropoda
- Class: Insecta
- Order: Plecoptera
- Family: Perlidae
- Subfamily: Perlinae
- Genus: Neoperla
- Species: N. coosa

Binomial name
- Neoperla coosa Smith & Stark, 1998

Species of stonefly

Neoperla coosa, the coosa stone, is a species of common stonefly in the family Perlidae. It is found in North America.
