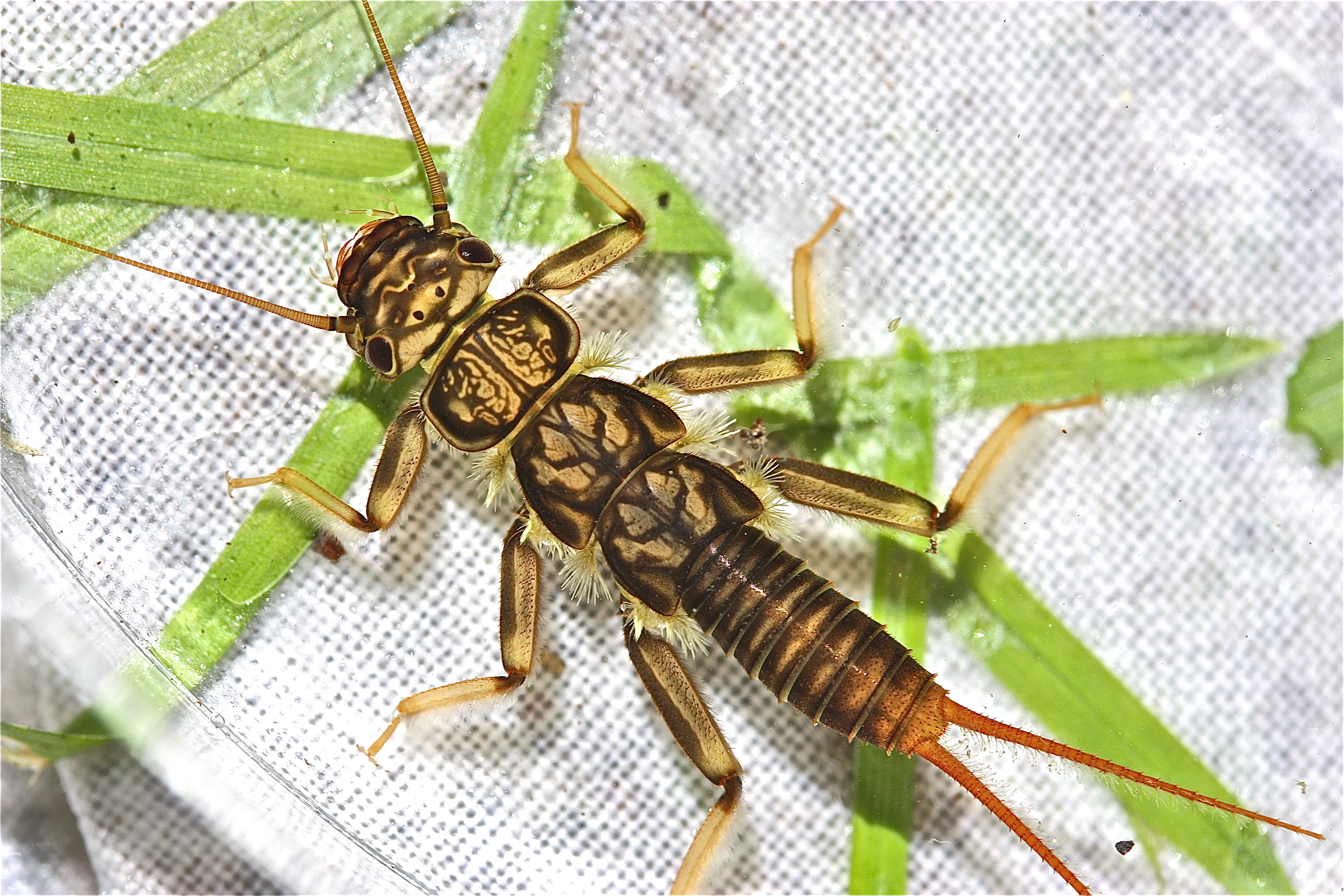

Scientific classification
- Domain: Eukaryota
- Kingdom: Animalia
- Phylum: Arthropoda
- Class: Insecta
- Order: Plecoptera
- Family: Perlidae
- Genus: Calineuria
- Species: C. californica

Binomial name
- Calineuria californica (Banks, 1905)

= Calineuria californica =

Species of stonefly

Calineuria californica, the western stone, is a species of common stonefly in the family Perlidae. It is found in North America.
