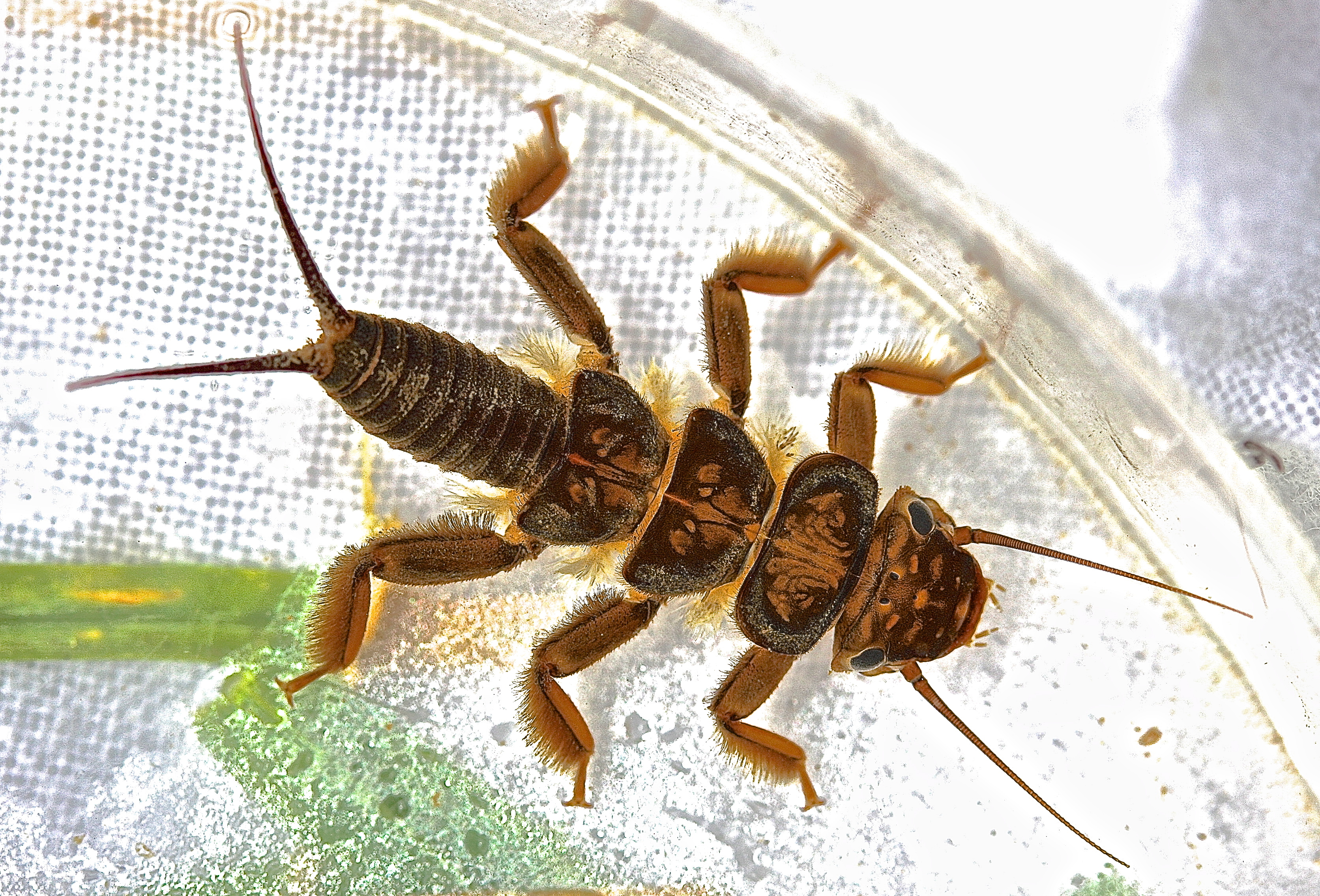

Scientific classification
- Domain: Eukaryota
- Kingdom: Animalia
- Phylum: Arthropoda
- Class: Insecta
- Order: Plecoptera
- Family: Perlidae
- Genus: Paragnetina
- Species: P. media

Binomial name
- Paragnetina media (Walker, 1852)

= Paragnetina media =

Species of stonefly

Paragnetina media, the embossed stonefly, is a species of common stonefly in the family Perlidae. It is found in North America.
