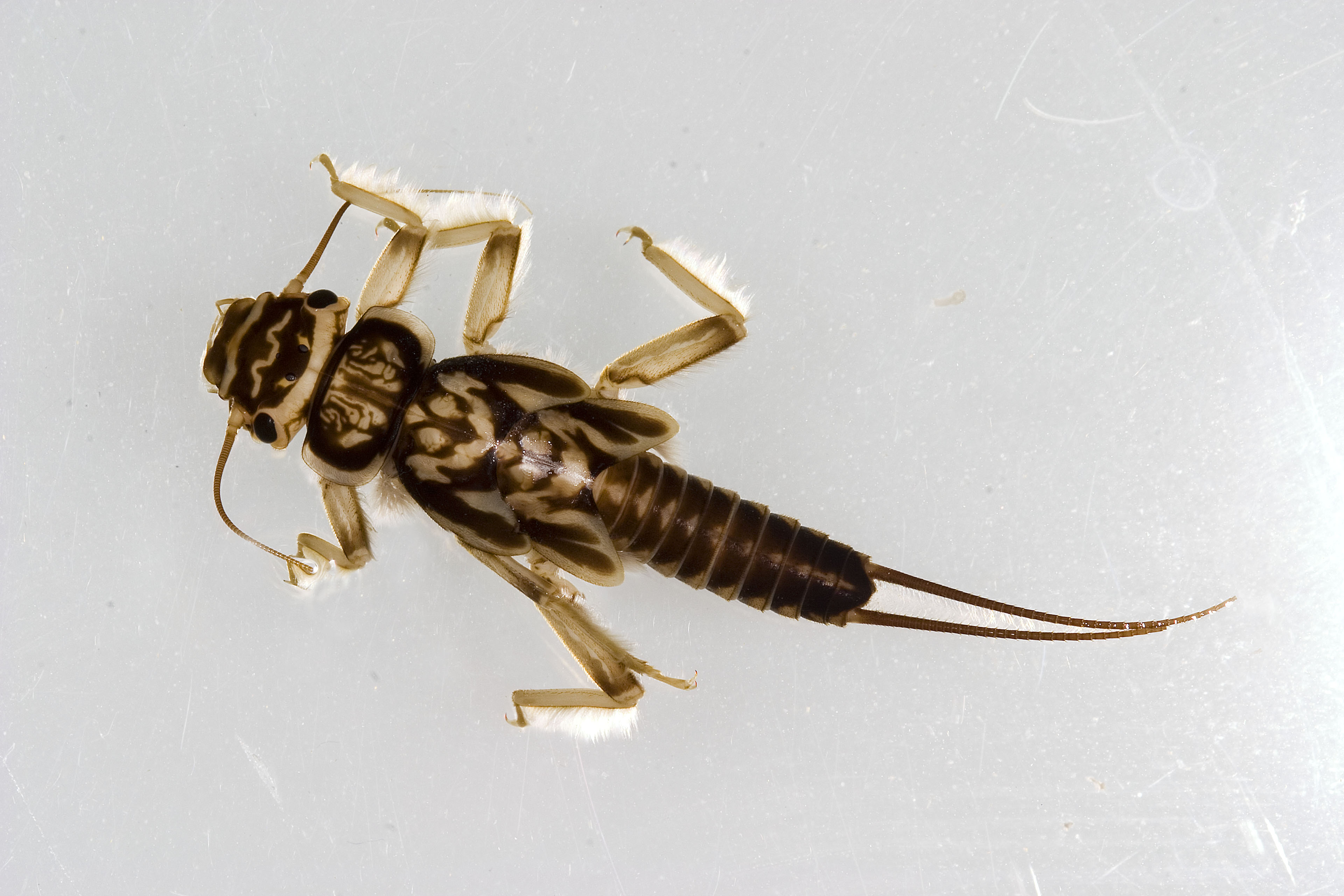

Scientific classification
- Domain: Eukaryota
- Kingdom: Animalia
- Phylum: Arthropoda
- Class: Insecta
- Order: Plecoptera
- Family: Perlidae
- Tribe: Acroneuriini
- Genus: Acroneuria
- Species: A. abnormis

Binomial name
- Acroneuria abnormis (Newman, 1838)

= Acroneuria abnormis =

Species of stonefly

Acroneuria abnormis, the common stone, is a species of common stonefly in the family Perlidae. It is found in North America.

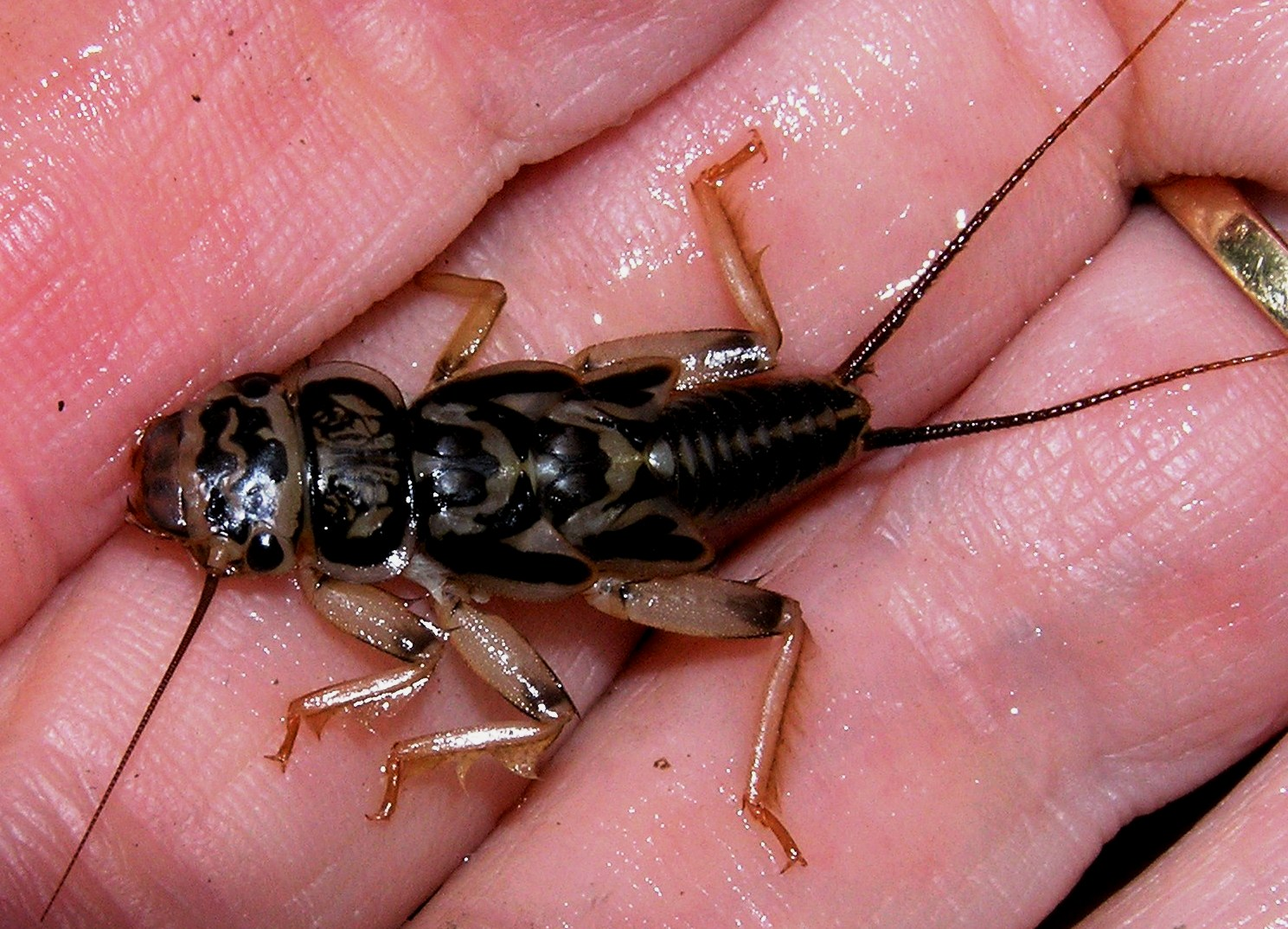
Common stone, Acroneuria abnormis

During mating, pairs engage in drumming behavior that can be used to identify species.
