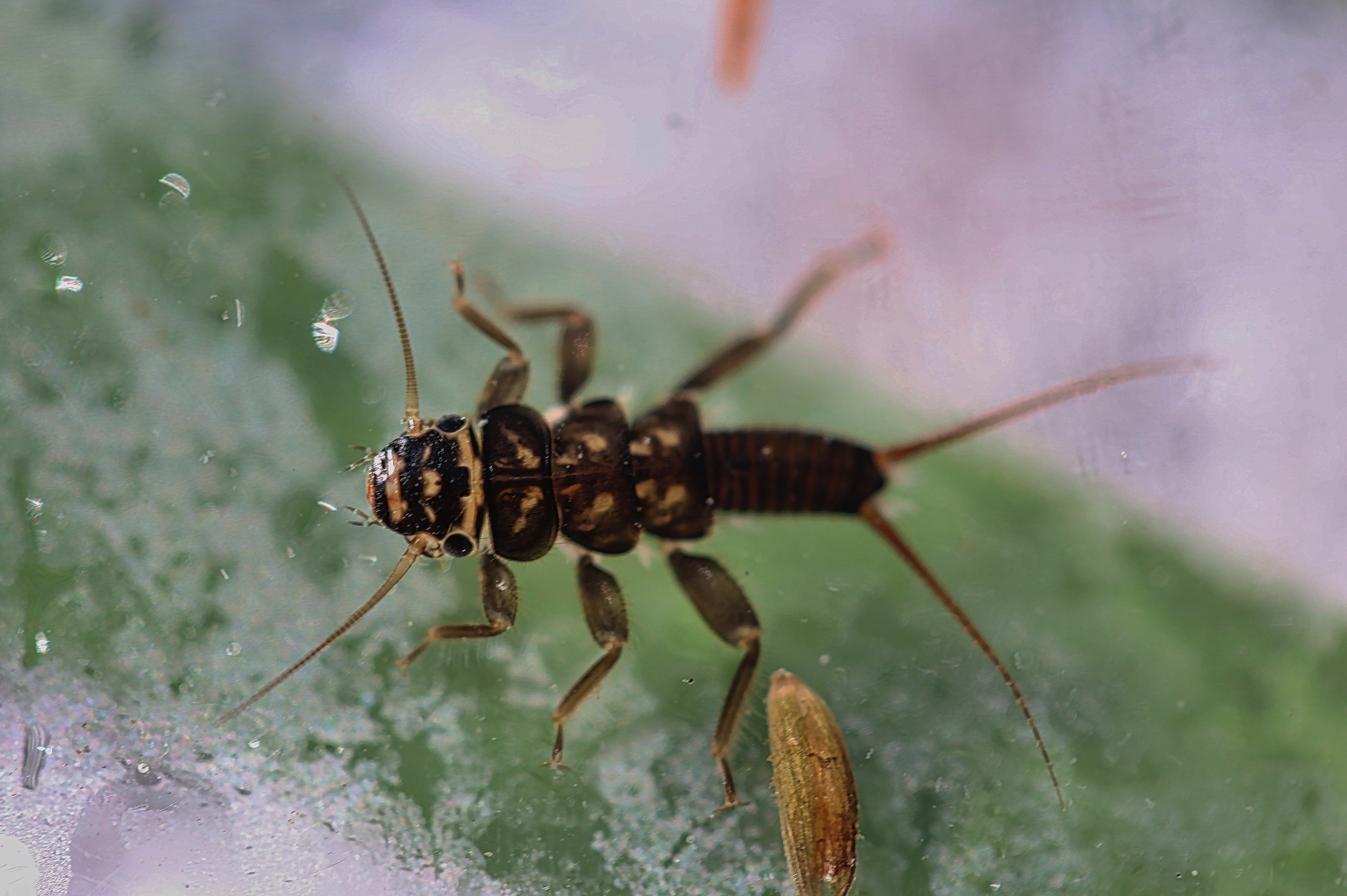

Scientific classification
- Domain: Eukaryota
- Kingdom: Animalia
- Phylum: Arthropoda
- Class: Insecta
- Order: Plecoptera
- Family: Perlidae
- Genus: Agnetina
- Species: A. annulipes

Binomial name
- Agnetina annulipes (Hagen, 1861)

= Agnetina annulipes =

Species of stonefly

Agnetina annulipes, the southern stone, is a species of common stonefly in the family Perlidae. It is found in North America.
