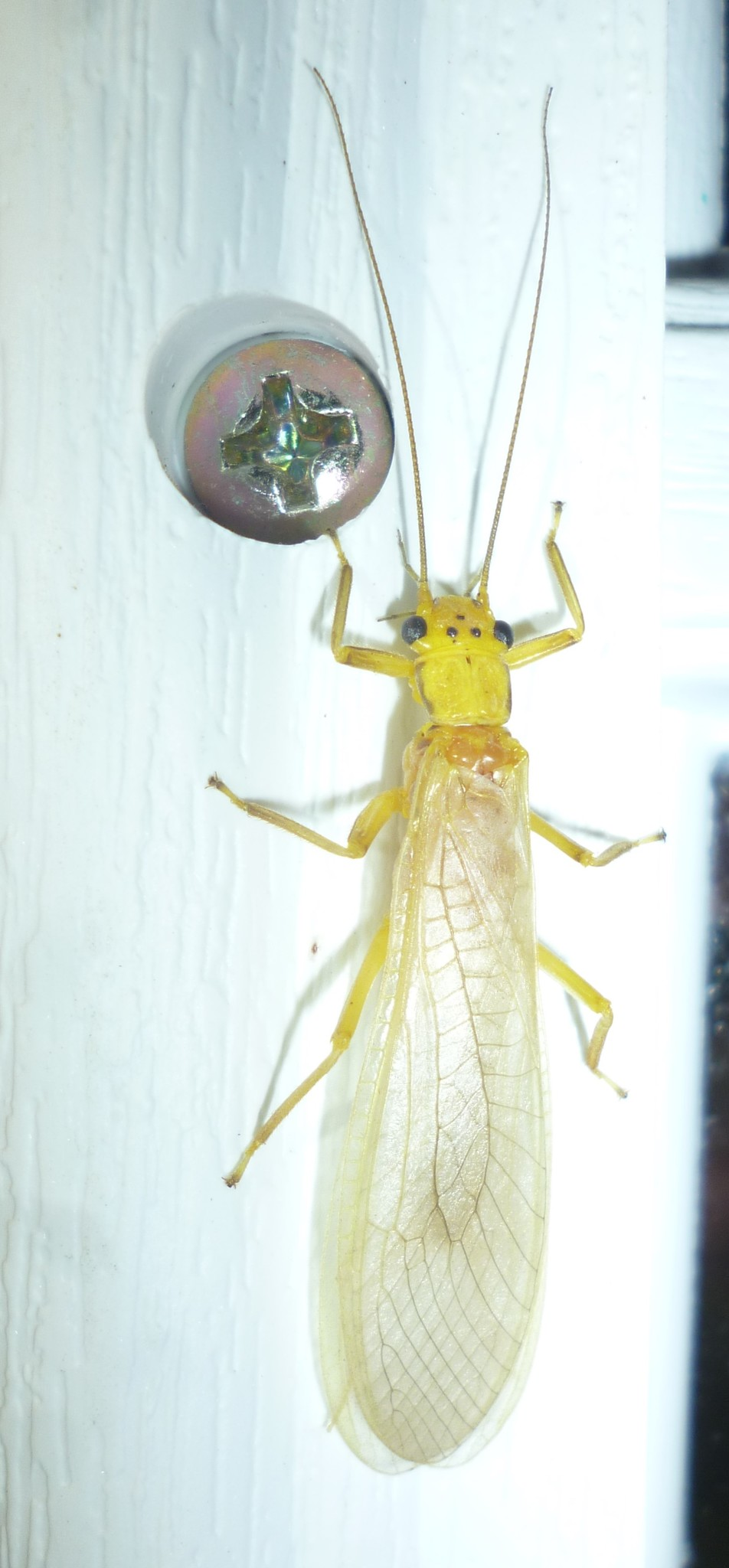

Scientific classification
- Domain: Eukaryota
- Kingdom: Animalia
- Phylum: Arthropoda
- Class: Insecta
- Order: Plecoptera
- Family: Perlidae
- Tribe: Acroneuriini
- Genus: Eccoptura; Klapálek, 1921

= Eccoptura =

Genus of stoneflies

Eccoptura is a genus of common stoneflies in the family Perlidae. There is at least one described species in Eccoptura, E. xanthenes. It is known as the "yellow stone" and is found in North America.
