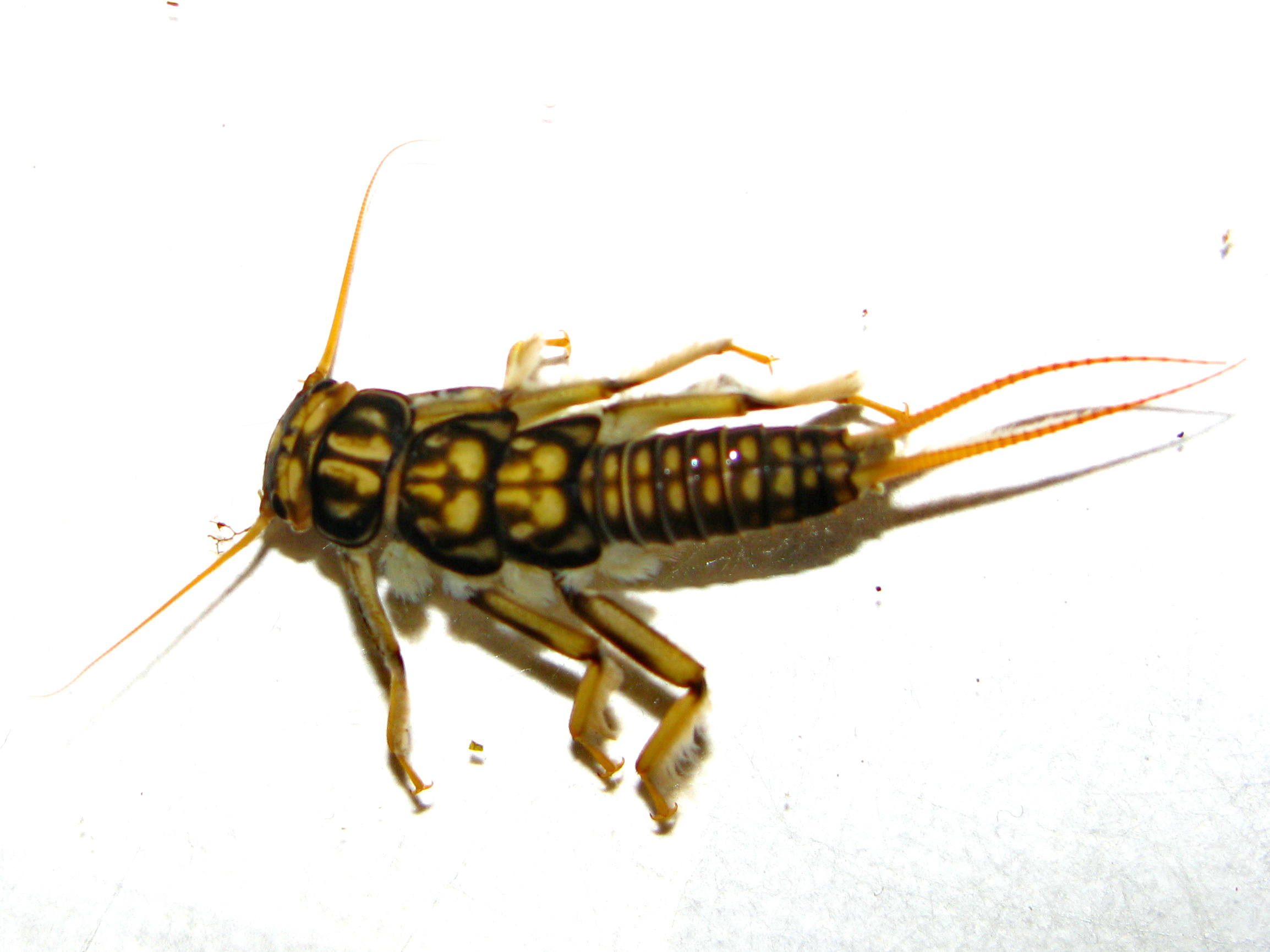
- Perla bipunctata

Scientific classification
- Domain: Eukaryota
- Kingdom: Animalia
- Phylum: Arthropoda
- Class: Insecta
- Order: Plecoptera
- Family: Perlidae
- Genus: Perla; Geoffroy, 1762

= Perla (stonefly) =

Genus of stoneflies

Perla is a genus of common stoneflies in the family Perlidae. There are at least 30 described species in Perla.

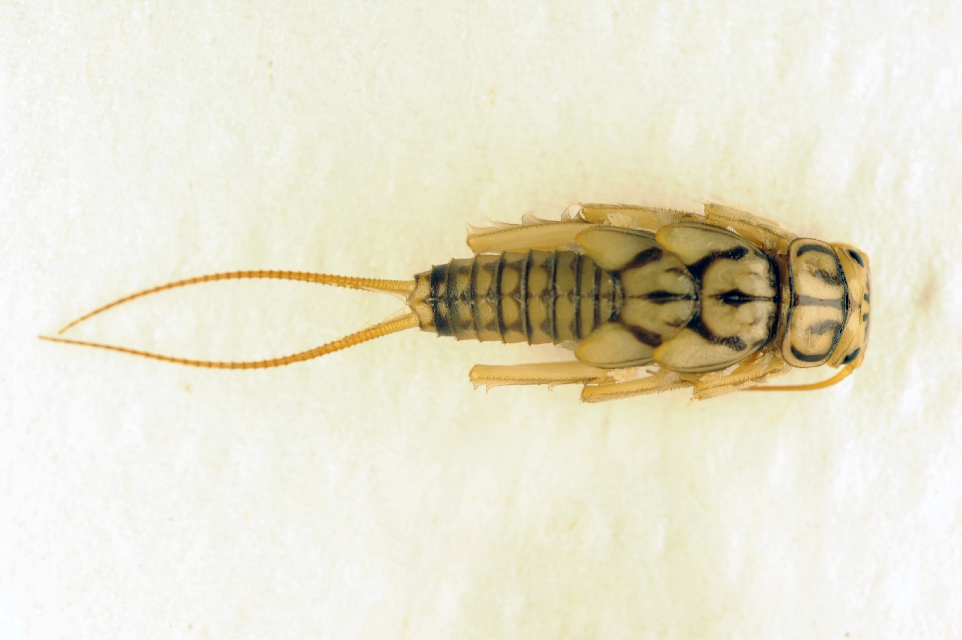
Perla marginata

== Species ==
These 30 species belong to the genus Perla:

- Perla abdominalis Guerin-Meneville, 1838^{c g}
- Perla aegyptiaca Pictet, F.J., 1841^{c g}
- Perla bipunctata Pictet, F.J., 1833^{c g}
- Perla burmeisteriana Claassen, 1936^{c g}
- Perla carantana Sivec & Graf, 2002^{c g}
- Perla carletoni Banks, 1920^{c g}
- Perla caucasica Guerin-Meneville, 1838^{c g}
- Perla caudata Klapálek, 1921^{c g}
- Perla comstocki Wu, C.F., 1937^{c g}
- Perla coulonii Pictet, F.J., 1841^{c g}
- Perla cymbele Needham, 1909^{c g}
- Perla duvaucelii Pictet, F.J., 1841^{c g}
- Perla grandis Rambur, 1842^{c g}
- Perla horvati Sivec & Stark, 2002^{c g}
- Perla illiesi Braasch & Joost, 1973^{c g}
- Perla ione Needham, 1909^{c g}
- Perla kiritschenkoi Zhiltzova, 1961^{c g}
- Perla lineatocollis Blanchard, 1851^{g}
- Perla madritensis Rambur, 1842^{c g}
- Perla marginata Panzer, 1799^{i c g}
- Perla maxima (Scopoli, 1763)^{i}
- Perla melanophthalma Navás, 1926^{c g}
- Perla mexicana Guerin-Meneville, 1838^{c g}
- Perla minor Curtis, 1827^{c g}
- Perla nirvana Banks, 1920^{c g}
- Perla orientalis Claassen, 1936^{c g}
- Perla pallida Guerin-Meneville, 1838^{c g}
- Perla shestoperowi Navás, 1933^{c g}
- Perla xenocia Banks, 1914^{c g}
- Perla zwicki Sivec & Stark, 2002^{c g}

Data sources: i = ITIS, c = Catalogue of Life, g = GBIF, b = Bugguide.net
