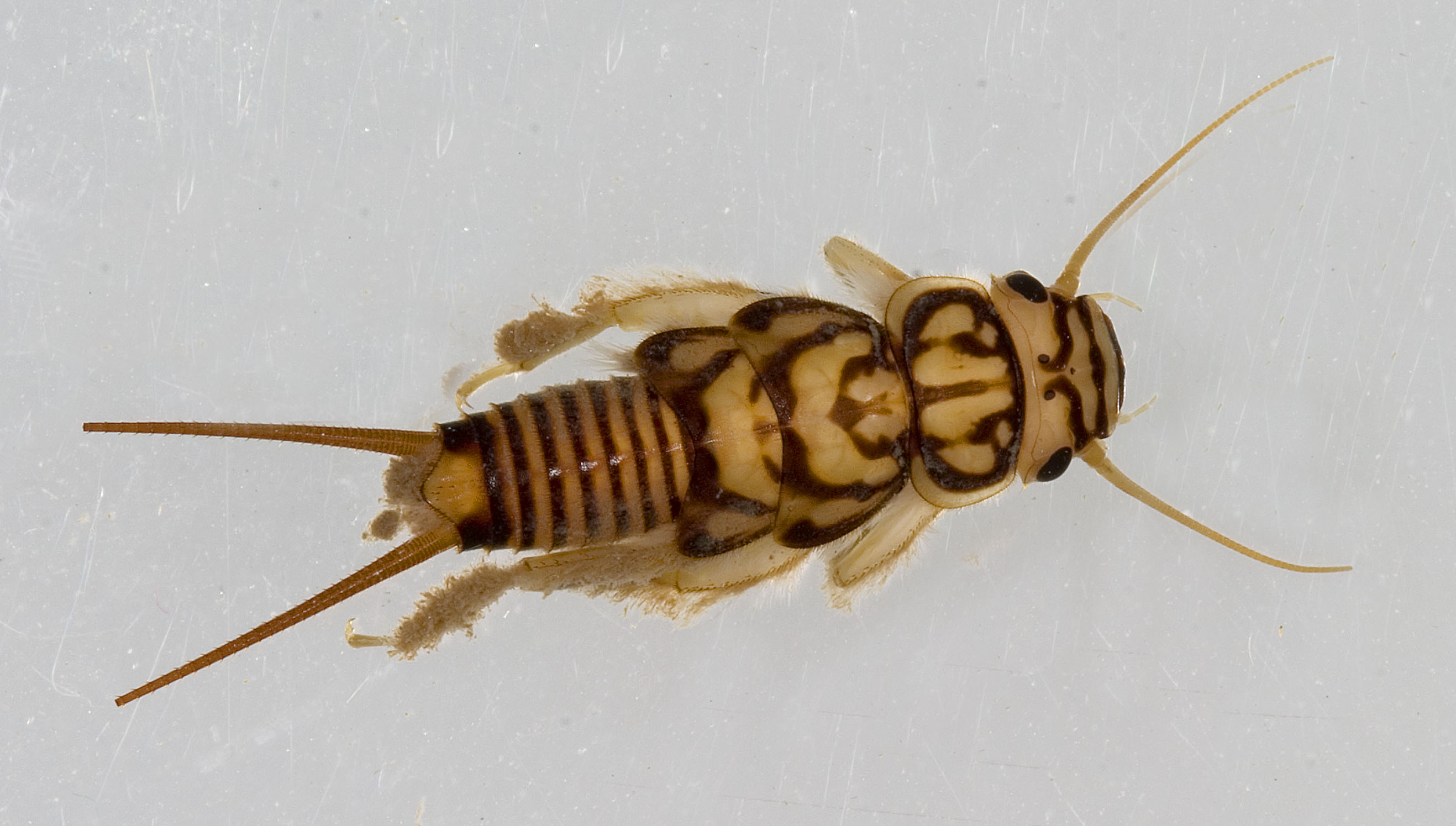
- Agnetina capitata

Scientific classification
- Kingdom: Animalia
- Phylum: Arthropoda
- Clade: Pancrustacea
- Class: Insecta
- Order: Plecoptera
- Family: Perlidae
- Tribe: Perlini
- Genus: Agnetina; Klapálek, 1907

Synonyms
- Harrisiola Banks, 1948; Neophasganophora Lestage, 1922; Phasganophora Klapálek, 1923

= Agnetina =

Genus of stoneflies

Agnetina is a genus of common stoneflies in the family Perlidae. There are at least 30 described species in Agnetina.

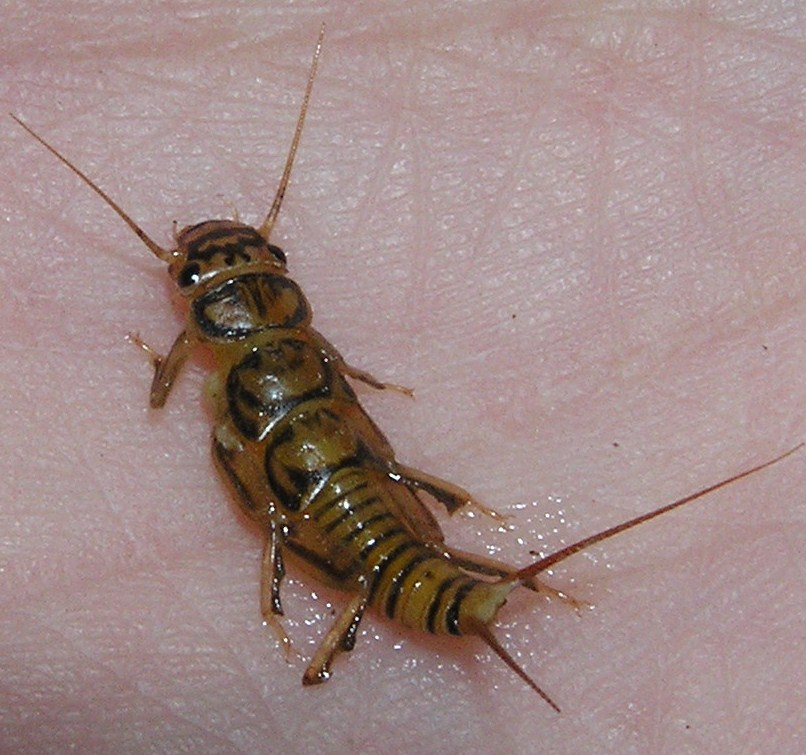
Agnetina flavescens

== Species ==
These 31 species belong to the genus Agnetina:

- Agnetina aequalis (Banks, 1937)^{c g}
- Agnetina annulipes (Hagen, 1861)^{i c g b} (southern stone)
- Agnetina armata (Banks, 1940)^{c g}
- Agnetina brevipennis (Navás, 1912)^{c g}
- Agnetina cadaverosa (McLachlan, 1875)^{c g}
- Agnetina capitata (Pictet, 1841)^{i c g b} (northern stone)
- Agnetina chrysodes Navás, 1919^{c g}
- Agnetina circumscripta (Klapálek, 1912)^{c g}
- Agnetina cocandica (McLachlan, 1875)^{c g}
- Agnetina curvigladiata Du, Y. & Chou, 1998^{c g}
- Agnetina den Cao, T.K.T. & Bae, 2006^{c g}
- Agnetina duplistyla (Wu, C.F., 1962)^{c g}
- Agnetina elegantula (Klapálek, 1905)^{c g}
- Agnetina extrema (Navás, 1912)^{c g}
- Agnetina flavescens (Walsh, 1862)^{i c g b} (midwestern stone)
- Agnetina gladiata (Wu, C.F., 1962)^{c g}
- Agnetina immersa (McLachlan, 1875)^{c g}
- Agnetina jarai Stark & Sivec, 1991^{c g}
- Agnetina kryzhanovskii Sivec & Zhiltzova, 1997^{c g}
- Agnetina longihirta Du, Y. & Chou, 1998^{c g}
- Agnetina multispinosa (Wu, C.F., 1938)^{c g}
- Agnetina navasi (Wu, C.F., 1935)^{c g}
- Agnetina pedata (Koponen, 1949)^{c g}
- Agnetina praeusta (Klapálek, 1912)^{c g}
- Agnetina quadrituberculata (Wu, C.F., 1935)^{c g}
- Agnetina senilis Klapálek, 1921^{c g}
- Agnetina spinata (Wu, C.F., 1949)^{c g}
- Agnetina starki Du, Y. & Chou, 1998^{c g}
- Agnetina vietnamica Li, Weihai & G. Wang, 2012^{c g}
- Agnetina werneri (Kempny, 1908)^{c g}
- Agnetina zwicki Stark & Sivec, 2008^{c g}

Data sources: i = ITIS, c = Catalogue of Life, g = GBIF, b = Bugguide.net
