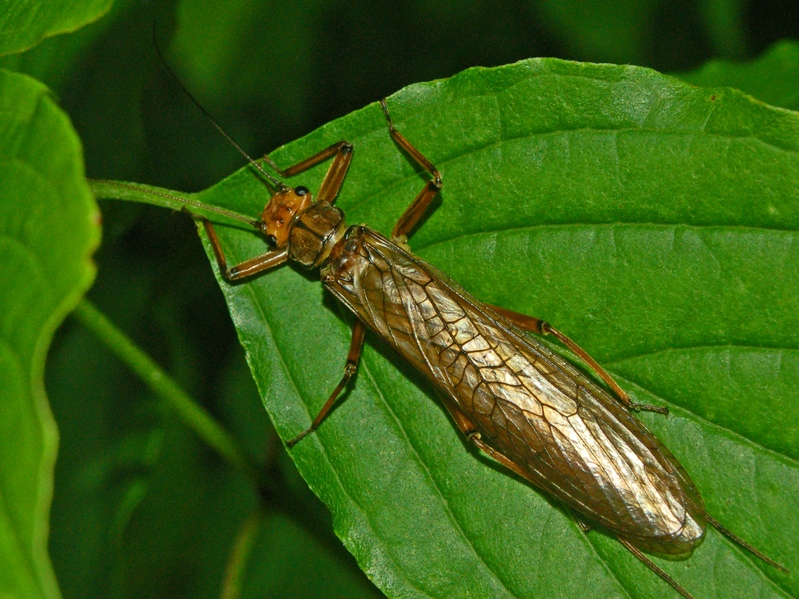
- Dinocras ferreri

Scientific classification
- Domain: Eukaryota
- Kingdom: Animalia
- Phylum: Arthropoda
- Class: Insecta
- Order: Plecoptera
- Family: Perlidae
- Genus: Dinocras; Klapálek, 1907

= Dinocras =

Genus of stoneflies

Dinocras is a genus of stoneflies belonging to the family Perlidae, one of the oldest order of insects (about 220 million years ago).

== Species ==
- Dinocras cephalotes (Curtis, 1827)
- Dinocras ferreri (Pictet, 1841)
- Dinocras megacephala (Klapálek, 1907)
