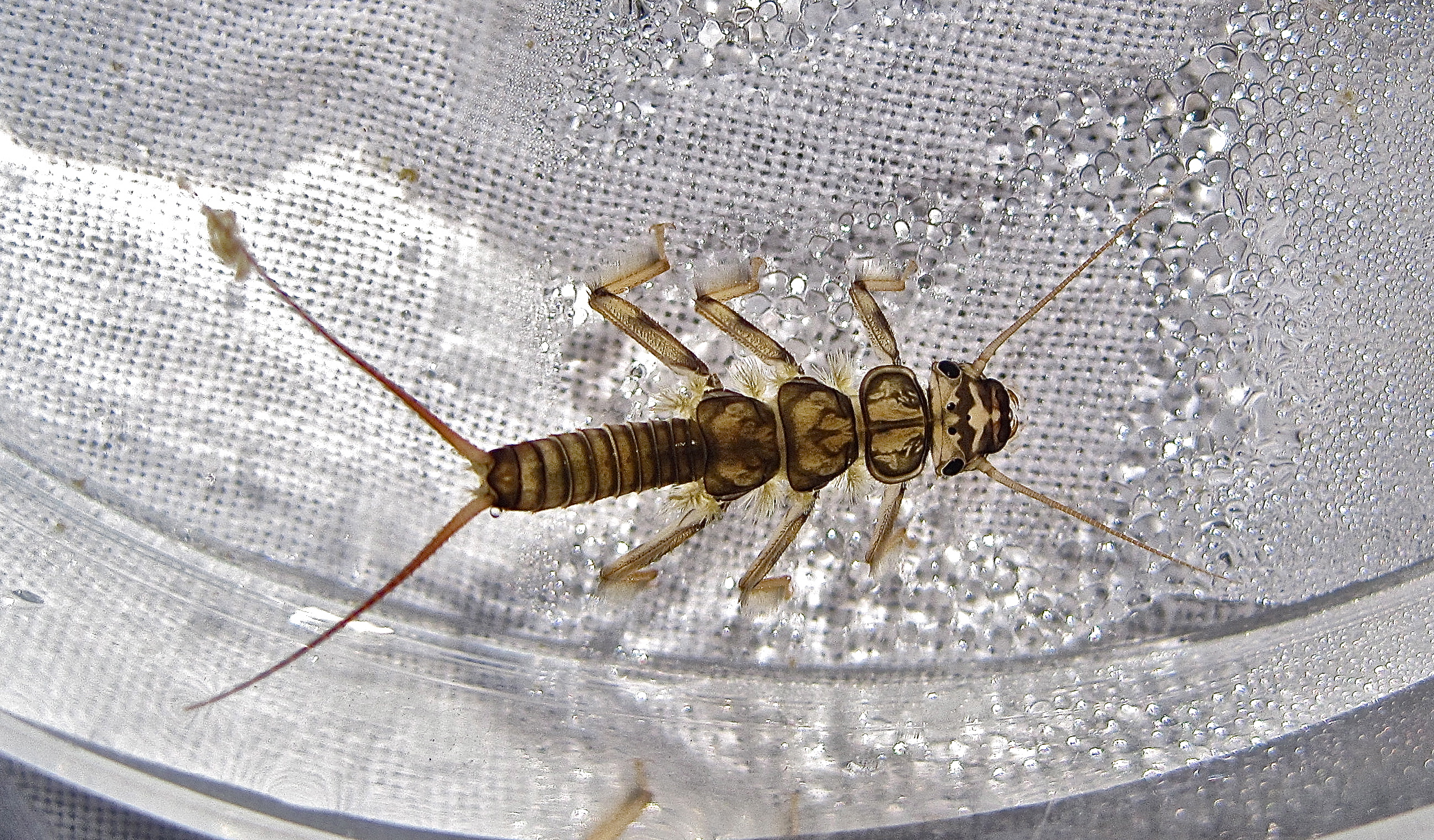
- Claassenia sabulosa

Scientific classification
- Domain: Eukaryota
- Kingdom: Animalia
- Phylum: Arthropoda
- Class: Insecta
- Order: Plecoptera
- Family: Perlidae
- Subfamily: Perlinae
- Genus: Claassenia; Wu, 1934

= Claassenia =

Genus of stoneflies

Claassenia is a genus of common stoneflies in the family Perlidae. There are about 12 described species in Claassenia.

== Species ==
These 12 species belong to the genus Claassenia:

- Claassenia bischoffi (Wu, 1935)
- Claassenia brachyptera Brinck, 1954
- Claassenia caudata (Klapálek, 1916)
- Claassenia drukpa Stark & Sivec, 2010
- Claassenia fulva Wu, 1973
- Claassenia gigas (Klapálek, 1916)
- Claassenia longistyla Wu, 1973
- Claassenia magna Wu, 1948
- Claassenia radiata (Klapálek, 1916)
- Claassenia sabulosa (Banks, 1900) (short-wing stone)
- Claassenia semibrachyptera Wu & Claassen, 1934
- Claassenia tincta (Navás, 1923)
