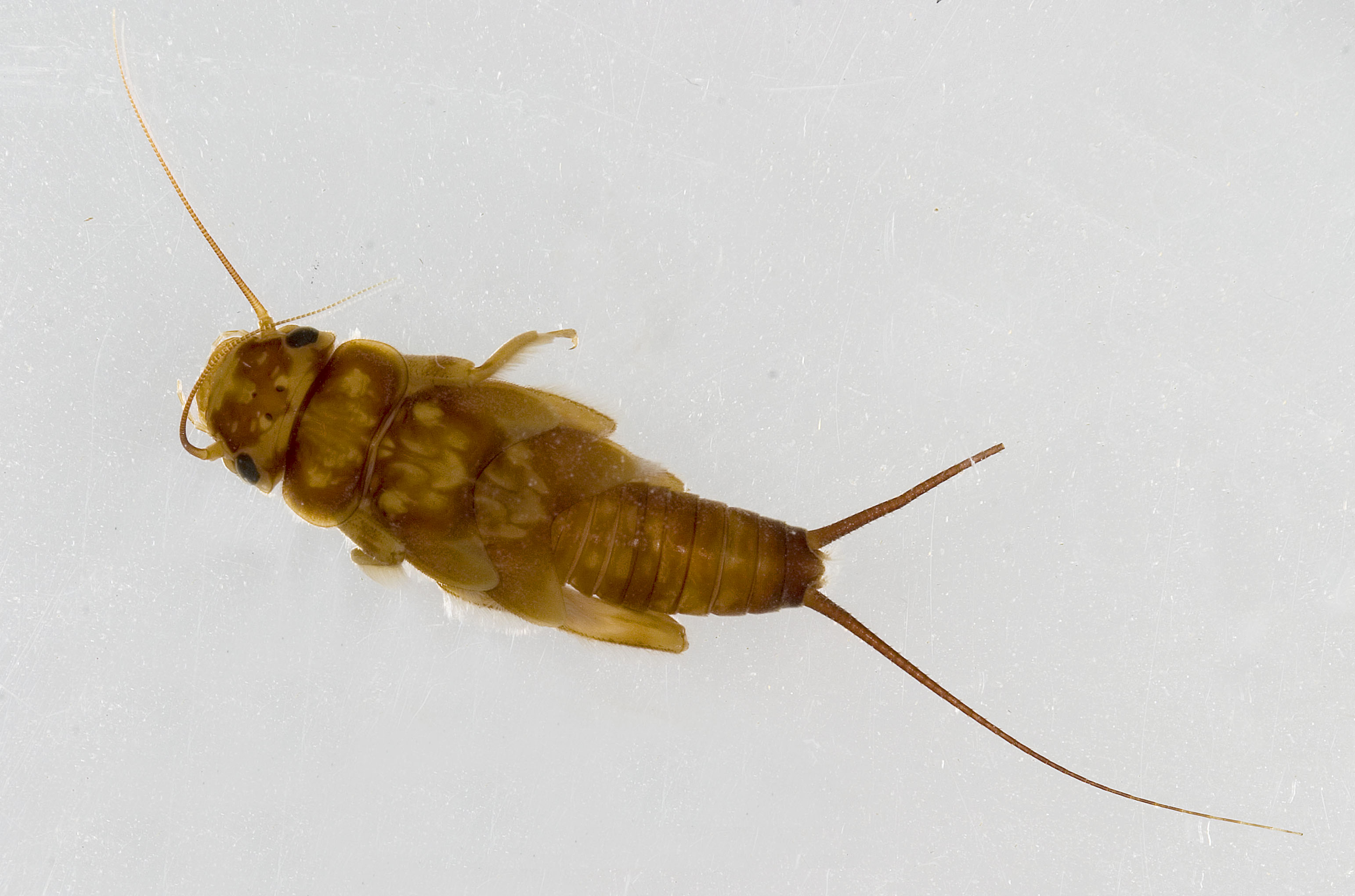

Scientific classification
- Domain: Eukaryota
- Kingdom: Animalia
- Phylum: Arthropoda
- Class: Insecta
- Order: Plecoptera
- Family: Perlidae
- Tribe: Perlini
- Genus: Paragnetina; Klapálek, 1907

Synonyms
- Banksiana Claassen, 1936; Banksiella Klapálek, 1921

= Paragnetina =

Genus of stoneflies

Paragnetina is a genus of common stoneflies in the family Perlidae. There are at least 20 described species in Paragnetina.

== Species ==
These 26 species belong to the genus Paragnetina.

- Paragnetina acutistyla Wu, C.F., 1973
- Paragnetina chinensis (Klapálek, 1912)
- Paragnetina esquiroli Navás, 1926
- Paragnetina excavata Klapálek, 1921
- Paragnetina flavotincta (McLachlan, 1872)
- Paragnetina fumosa (Banks, 1902) (smoky stone)
- Paragnetina hummelina (Navás, 1936)
- Paragnetina ichusa Stark and Szczytko, 1981
- Paragnetina immarginata (Say, 1823) (beautiful stone)
- Paragnetina indentata Wu, C.F. & Claassen, 1934
- Paragnetina insignis Banks, 1939
- Paragnetina japonica (Okamoto, 1912)
- Paragnetina kansensis (Banks, 1905)
- Paragnetina lacrimosa Klapálek, 1921
- Paragnetina ledoensis Stark & Szczytko, 1981
- Paragnetina media (Walker, 1852) (embossed stonefly)
- Paragnetina minor (Klapálek, 1913)
- Paragnetina neimongolica Yang, D. & C. Yang, 1996
- Paragnetina ochrocephala Klapálek, 1921
- Paragnetina pieli Navás, 1933
- Paragnetina planidorsa (Klapálek, 1913)
- Paragnetina schenklingi Klapálek, 1921
- Paragnetina suzukii (Okamoto, 1912)
- Paragnetina tinctipennis (McLachlan, 1875)
- Paragnetina transoxanica (Klapálek, 1921)
- Paragnetina transversa (Wu, C.F., 1962)
