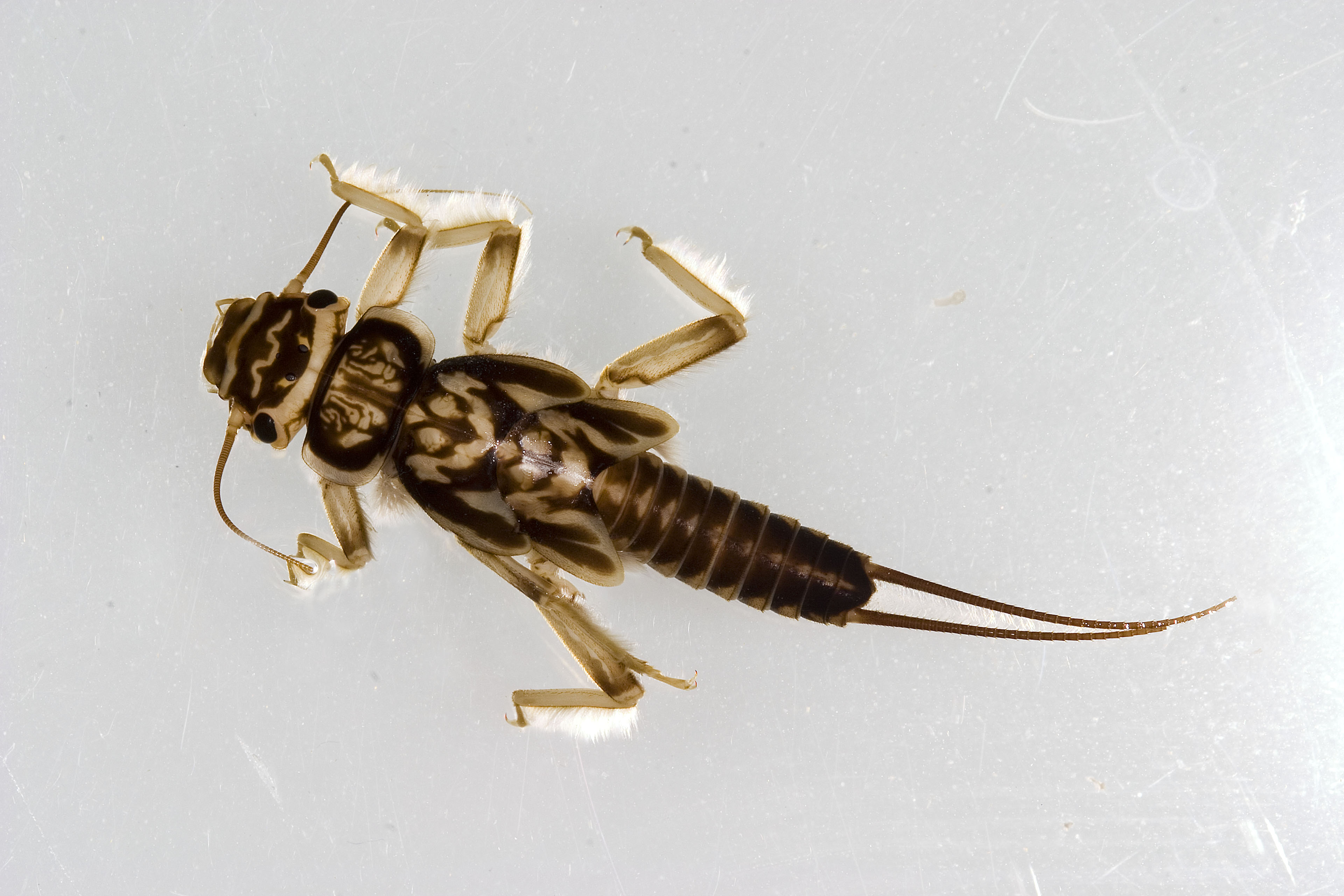
- Acroneuria abnormis

Scientific classification
- Kingdom: Animalia
- Phylum: Arthropoda
- Class: Insecta
- Order: Plecoptera
- Family: Perlidae
- Subfamily: Acroneuriinae
- Tribe: Acroneuriini
- Genus: Acroneuria; Pictet, 1841

= Acroneuria =

Genus of stoneflies

Acroneuria is a genus of common stoneflies in the family Perlidae. There are more than 30 described species in Acroneuria.

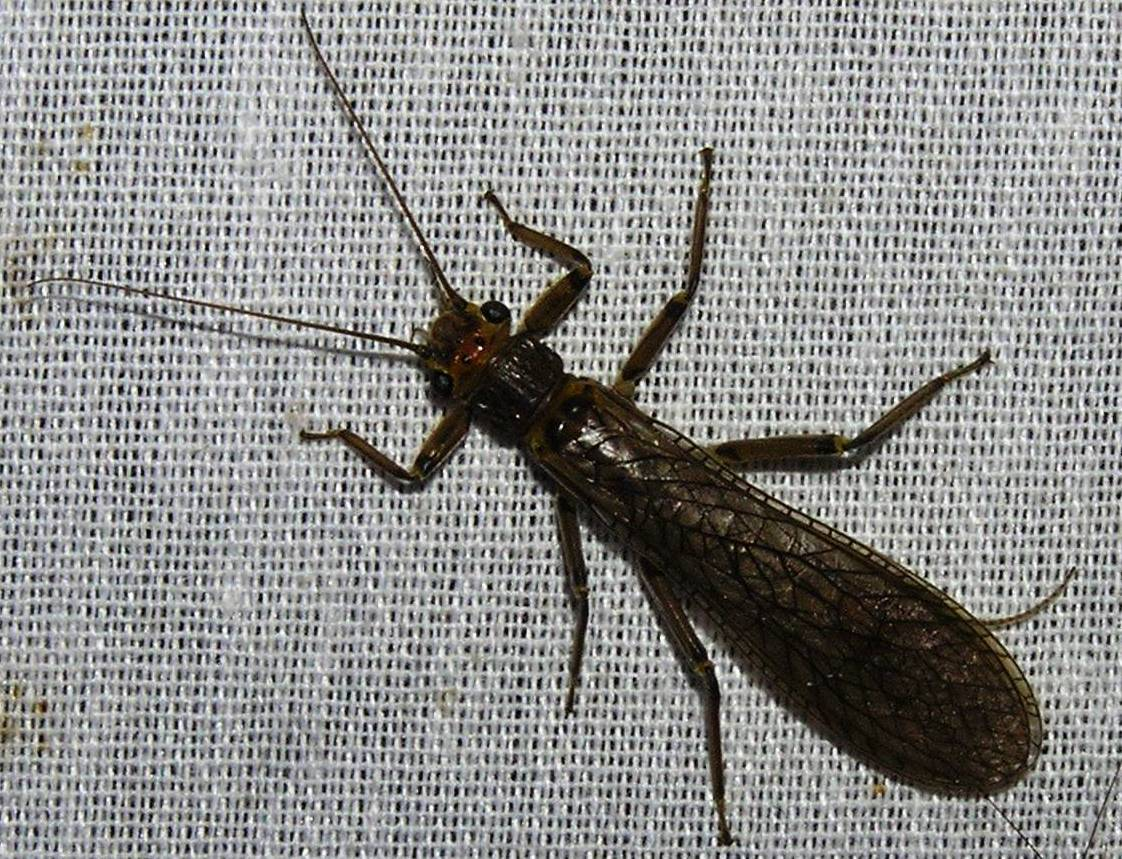
Acroneuria perplexa

== Species ==
These 32 species belong to the genus Acroneuria:

- Acroneuria abnormis (Newman, 1838) (common stone)
- Acroneuria apicalis Stark & Sivec, 2008
- Acroneuria arenosa (Pictet, 1841) (eastern stone)
- Acroneuria arida (Hagen, 1861)
- Acroneuria azunensis Stark & Sivec, 2008
- Acroneuria bachma Cao & Bae, 2007
- Acroneuria carolinensis (Banks, 1905) (Carolina stone)
- Acroneuria covelli Grubbs & Stark, 2004
- Acroneuria distinguenda Zwick, 1977
- Acroneuria evoluta Klapálek, 1909 (constricted stone)
- Acroneuria filicis Frison, 1942
- Acroneuria flinti Stark & Gaufin, 1976
- Acroneuria frisoni Stark & Brown, 1991
- Acroneuria grahamia Wu & Claassen, 1934
- Acroneuria hainana Wu, 1938
- Acroneuria hitchcocki Kondratieff & Kirchner, 1988
- Acroneuria internata (Walker, 1852)
- Acroneuria kirchneri Stark & Kondratieff, 2004
- Acroneuria kosztarabi Kondratieff & Kirchner, 1993
- Acroneuria lycorias (Newman, 1839) (boreal stone)
- Acroneuria magnifica Cao & Bae, 2007
- Acroneuria morsei Du, 2000
- Acroneuria multiconata Du, 2000
- Acroneuria nobilitata Enderlein, 1909
- Acroneuria omeiana Wu, 1948
- Acroneuria ozarkensis Poulton & Stewart, 1991 (Ozark stone)
- Acroneuria perplexa Frison, 1937
- Acroneuria personata Harper, 1976
- Acroneuria petersi Stark & Gaufin, 1976
- Acroneuria sinica Yang & Yang, 1998
- Acroneuria yuchi Stark & Kondratieff, 2004
- Acroneuria zhejiangensis Yang & Yang, 1995
