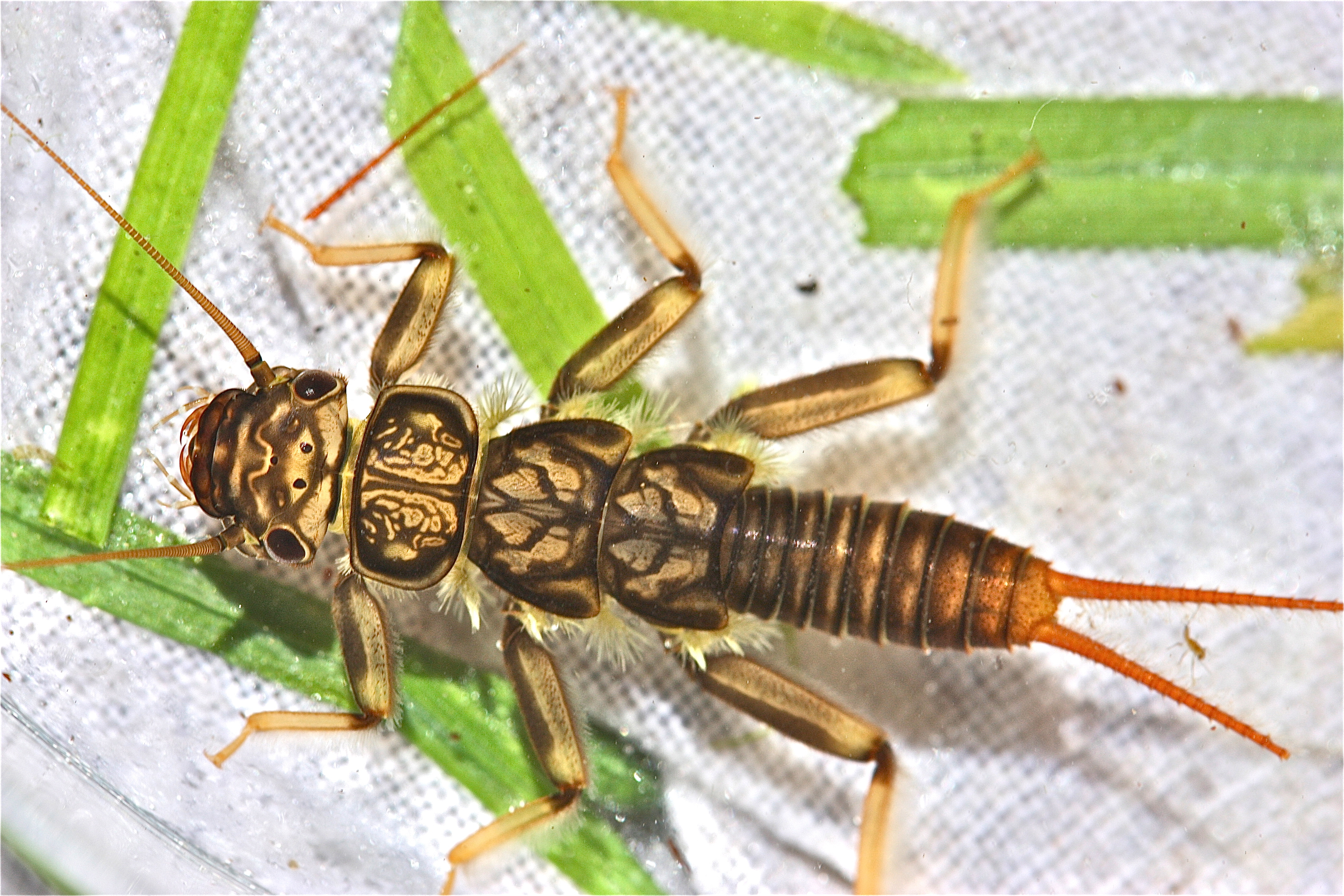
- Calineuria californica

Scientific classification
- Domain: Eukaryota
- Kingdom: Animalia
- Phylum: Arthropoda
- Class: Insecta
- Order: Plecoptera
- Family: Perlidae
- Subfamily: Acroneuriinae
- Genus: Calineuria; Ricker, 1954

= Calineuria =

Genus of stoneflies

Calineuria is a genus of common stoneflies in the family Perlidae. There are about seven described species in Calineuria.

== Species ==
These seven species belong to the genus Calineuria:

- Calineuria californica (Banks, 1905) (western stone)
- Calineuria crassicauda Uchida, 1983
- Calineuria infurcata Uchida, 1990
- Calineuria jezoensis (Okamoto, 1912)
- Calineuria komatsui Uchida, 1990
- Calineuria pectinata Uchida, 1990
- Calineuria stigmatica (Klapálek, 1907)
