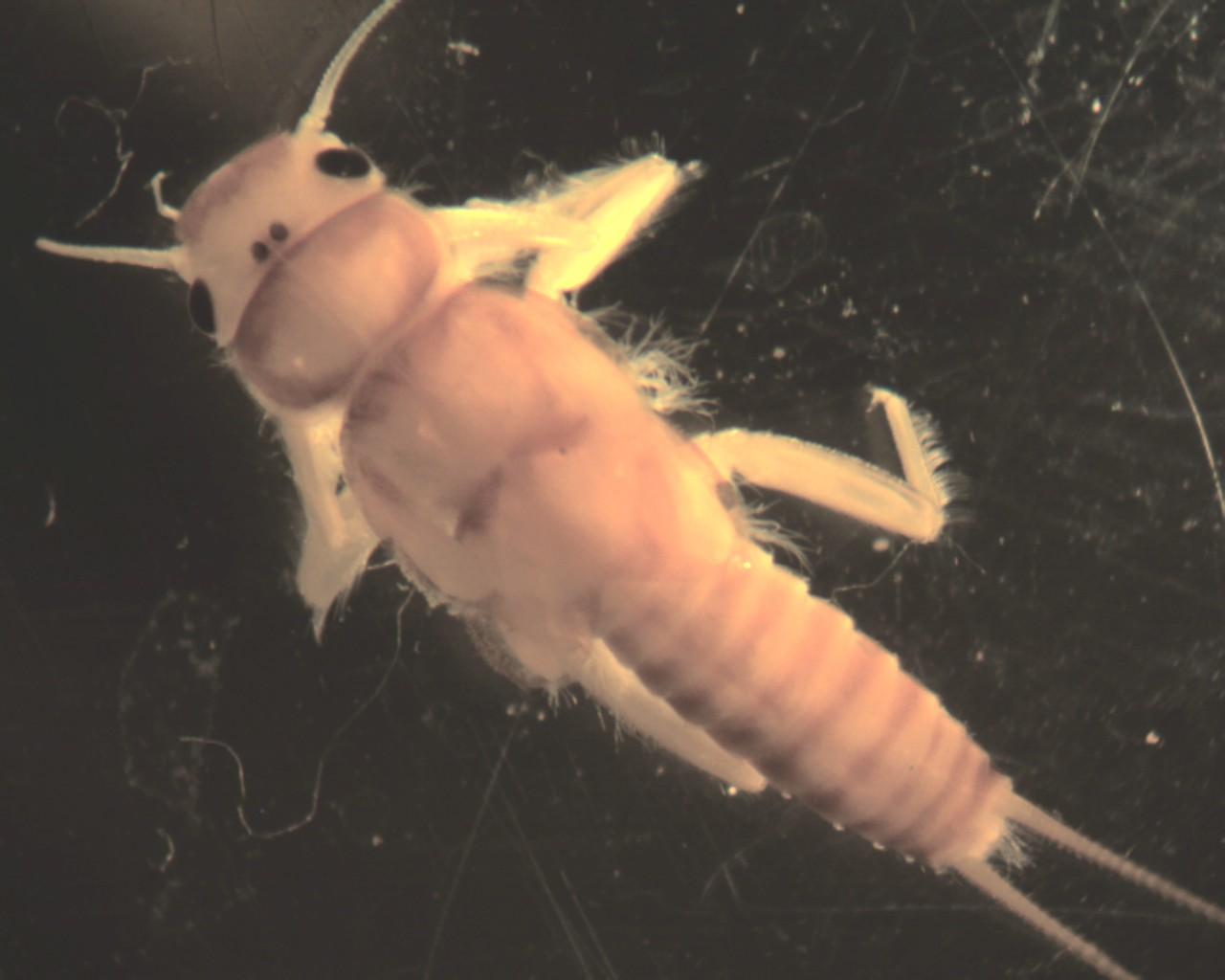

Scientific classification
- Kingdom: Animalia
- Phylum: Arthropoda
- Clade: Pancrustacea
- Class: Insecta
- Order: Plecoptera
- Family: Perlidae
- Subfamily: Perlinae
- Genus: Neoperla; Needham, 1905

Diversity
- at least 260 species

= Neoperla =

Genus of stoneflies

Neoperla is a genus of common stoneflies in the family Perlidae. There are more than 260 described species in Neoperla.

== Distribution and Diversity ==
Neoperla is among the most species-rich and widely distributed genera of stoneflies, with at least 271 described species worldwide. The genus exhibits a broad geographical range:

Asia: China alone hosts over 100 species, accounting for about 38% of the genus.

Africa: A comprehensive revision recognized 82 valid species in sub-Saharan Africa, all endemic to the region.

North America: Several species, such as Neoperla clymene and Neoperla coosa, are found across the eastern United States.

== See also ==
- List of Neoperla species
