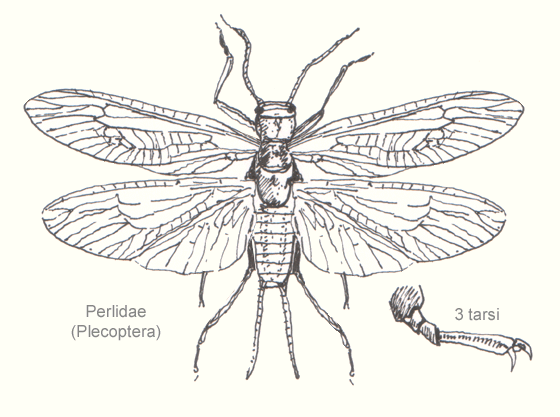

Scientific classification
- Kingdom: Animalia
- Phylum: Arthropoda
- Clade: Pancrustacea
- Class: Insecta
- Order: Plecoptera
- Superfamily: Perloidea
- Family: Perlidae; Latreille, 1802

Subfamilies
- Perlinae Latreille, 1802; Acroneuriinae Klapálek, 1914

= Perlidae =

Family of stoneflies

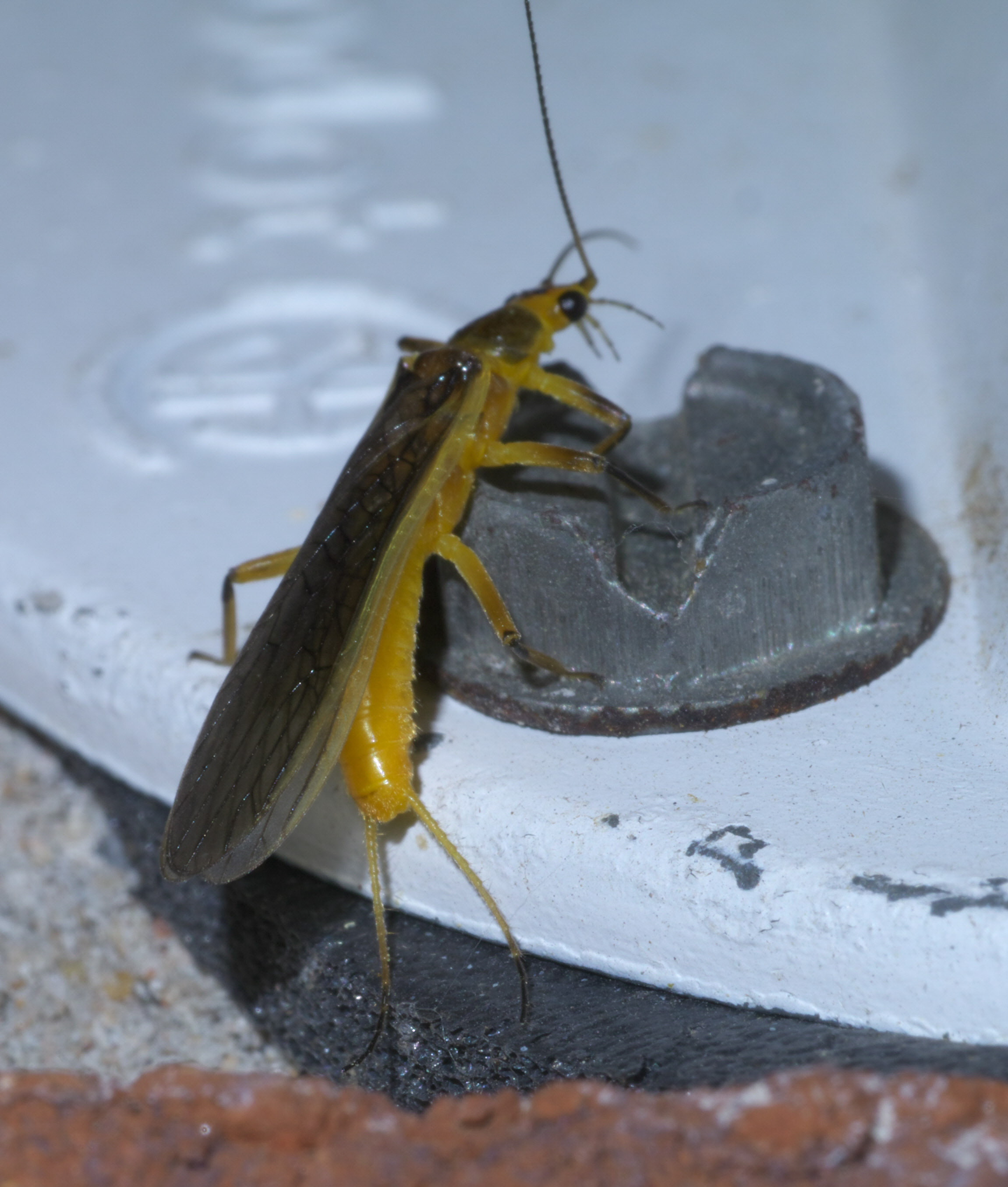
Common stoneflies, Perlidae

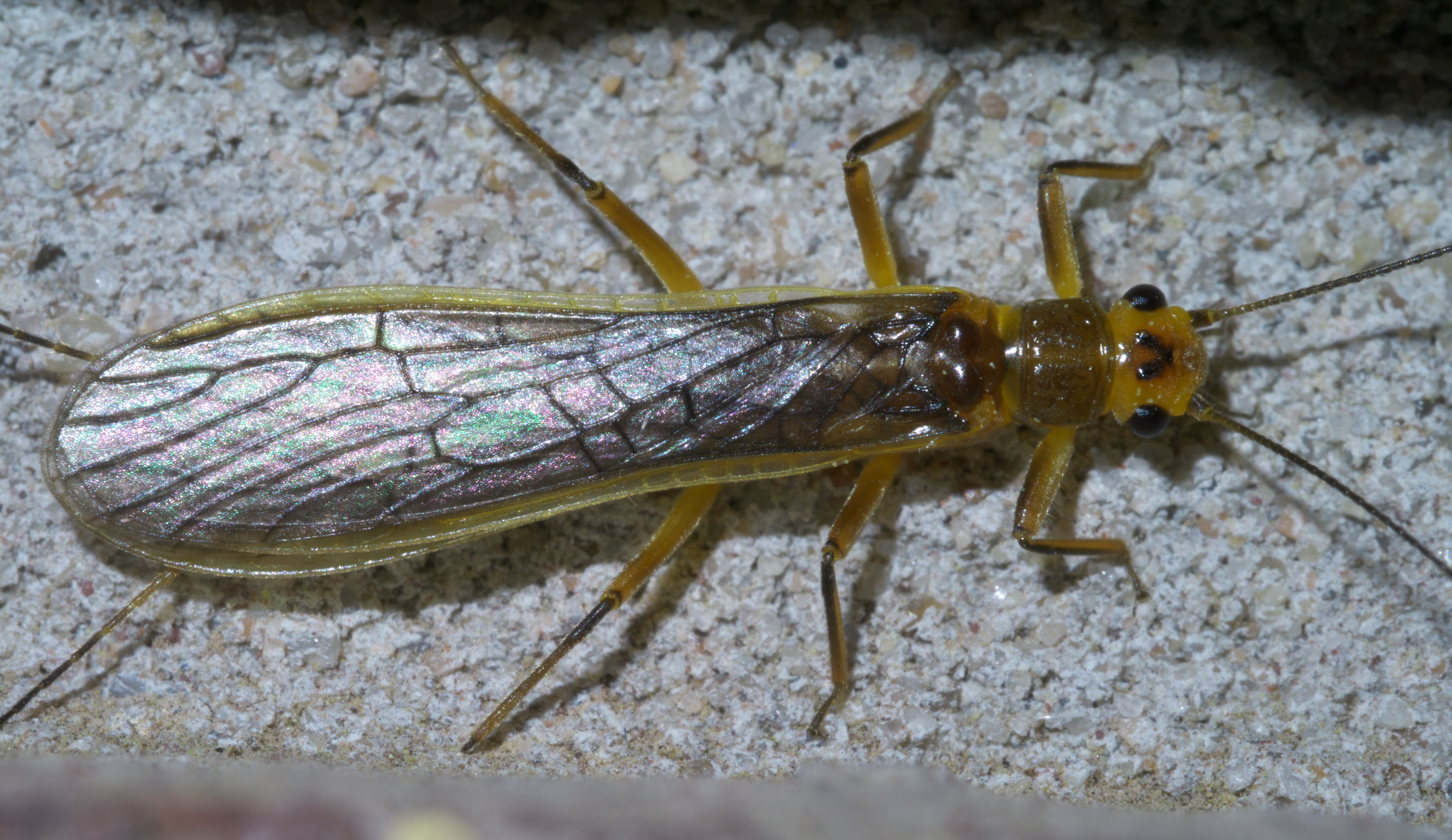
Common stoneflies, Perlidae

The Perlidae are a family of stoneflies, with more than 50 genera and 1,100 described species. The majority of the Perlidae are found in eastern North America, but they occur worldwide except for Antarctica and parts of Africa. Their lifecycles range between one and three years. The adults emerge in the summer; they are very active and known to be attracted to light sources. They are usually very sensitive to changes in environment.

Perlidae are usually lotic and lentic erosional. They are found in cool, clear medium-sized to large streams and sometimes in larger, warm rivers that carry silt. They are crawlers and can move quickly. In still water, no water moves over their gills, so they move their bodies up and down to keep oxygen flowing over them.

They are engulfer-predators. They consume all types of invertebrates. Very young larvae are collector-gatherers.

== Genera ==
These 56 genera belong to the family Perlidae:

- Acroneuria Pictet, 1841
- Agnetina Klapálek, 1907
- Anacroneuria Klapálek, 1909
- Attaneuria Ricker, 1954
- Beloneuria Needham & Claassen, 1925
- Brahmana Klapálek, 1914
- Calineuria Ricker, 1954
- Caroperla Kohno, 1946
- Chinoperla Zwick, 1980
- Claassenia Wu, 1934
- Dinocras Klapálek, 1907
- Doroneuria Needham & Claassen, 1925
- Eccoptura Klapálek, 1921
- Enderleina Jewett, 1960
- Eoperla Illies, 1956
- Etrocorema Klapálek, 1909
- Flavoperla Chu, 1929
- Furcaperla Sivec, 1988
- Gibosia Okamoto, 1912
- Hansonoperla Nelson, 1979
- Helenoperla Sivec, 1997
- Hemacroneuria Enderlein, 1909
- Hesperoperla Banks, 1938
- Inconeuria Klapálek, 1916
- Kamimuria Klapálek, 1907
- Kempnyella Illies, 1964
- Kempnyia Klapálek, 1914
- Kiotina Klapálek, 1907
- Klapalekia Claassen, 1936
- Macrogynoplax Enderlein, 1909
- Marthamea Klapálek, 1907
- Mesoperla Klapálek, 1913
- Miniperla Kawai, 1967
- Neoperla Needham, 1905
- Neoperlops Banks, 1939
- Nigroperla Illies, 1964
- Niponiella Klapálek, 1907
- Nishineuria Uchida, 1990
- Onychoplax Klapálek, 1914
- Oyamia Klapálek, 1907
- Paragnetina Klapálek, 1907
- Perla Geoffroy, 1762
- Perlesta Banks, 1906
- Perlinella Banks, 1900
- Phanoperla Banks, 1938
- Pictetoperla Illies, 1964
- Sinacroneuria Yang & Yang, 1995
- Tetropina Klapálek, 1909
- Togoperla Klapálek, 1907
- Tyloperla Sivec & Stark, 1988
- Xanthoneuria Uchida, Stark & Sivec, 2011
- † Archaeoperla Liu, Ren & Sinitshenkova, 2008
- † Dominiperla Stark & Lentz, 1992
- † Electroneuria Sroka, Staniczek & Kondratieff, 2018
- † Largusoperla Chen, Wang & Du, 2018
- † Pinguisoperla Chen, 2018
