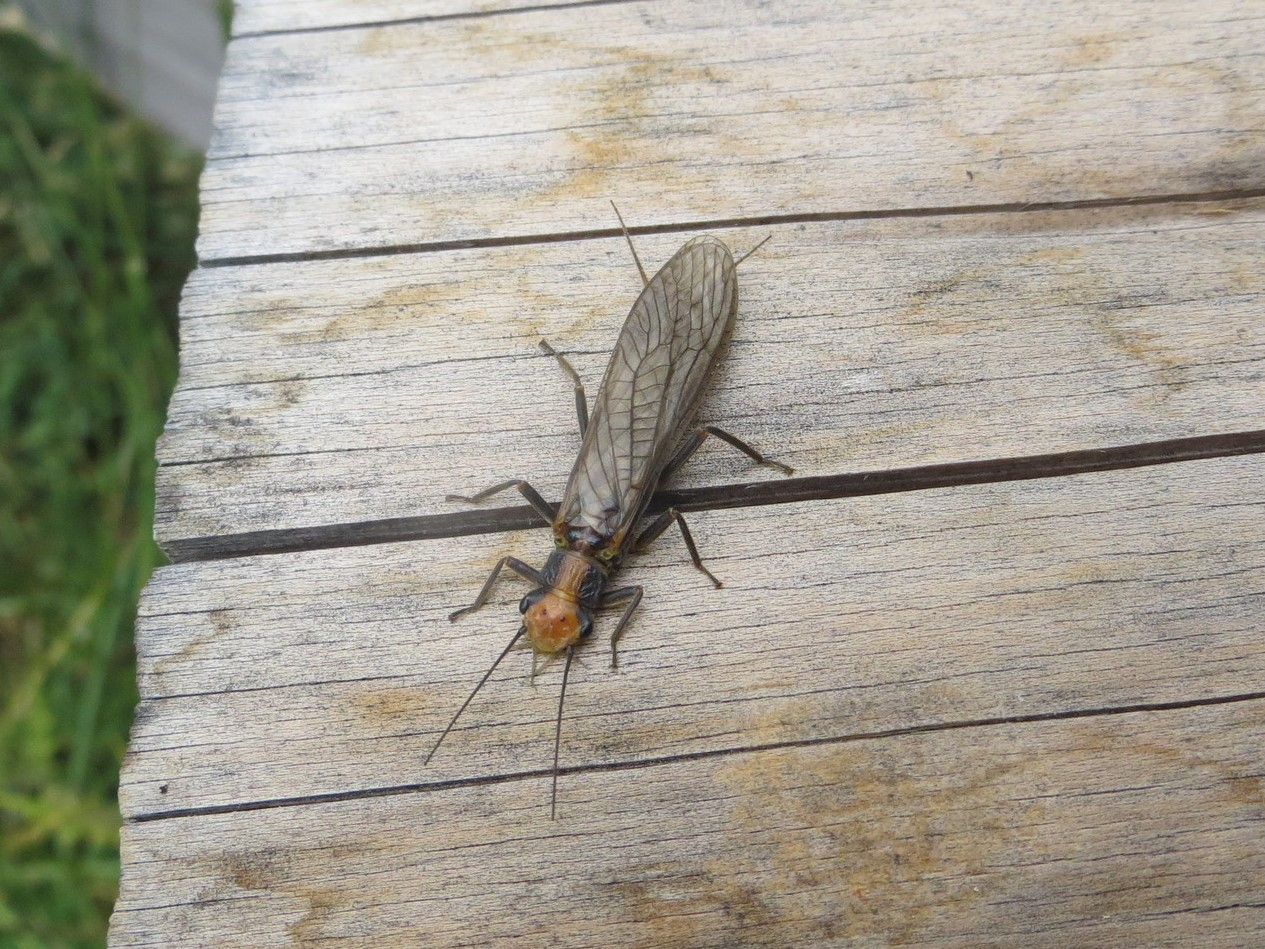

Scientific classification
- Domain: Eukaryota
- Kingdom: Animalia
- Phylum: Arthropoda
- Class: Insecta
- Order: Plecoptera
- Family: Perlidae
- Subfamily: Acroneuriinae
- Genus: Hesperoperla
- Species: H. hoguei

Binomial name
- Hesperoperla hoguei Baumann & Stark, 1980

= Hesperoperla hoguei =

Species of stonefly

Hesperoperla hoguei, the banded stone, is a species of common stonefly in the family Perlidae. It is found in North America.
