= Doroneuria baumanni =

Scientific classification
- Domain: Eukaryota
- Kingdom: Animalia
- Phylum: Arthropoda
- Class: Insecta
- Order: Plecoptera
- Family: Perlidae
- Subfamily: Acroneuriinae
- Genus: Doroneuria
- Species: D. baumanni

Binomial name
- Doroneuria baumanni Stark & Gaufin, 1974

Species of stonefly

Doroneuria baumanni, the cascades stone, is a species of common stonefly in the family Perlidae. It is found in North America.
