= Perlesta nelsoni =

Scientific classification
- Domain: Eukaryota
- Kingdom: Animalia
- Phylum: Arthropoda
- Class: Insecta
- Order: Plecoptera
- Family: Perlidae
- Subfamily: Acroneuriinae
- Genus: Perlesta
- Species: P. nelsoni

Binomial name
- Perlesta nelsoni Stark, 1989

Species of stonefly

Perlesta nelsoni, the pale stone, is a species of common stonefly in the family Perlidae. It is found in North America.
