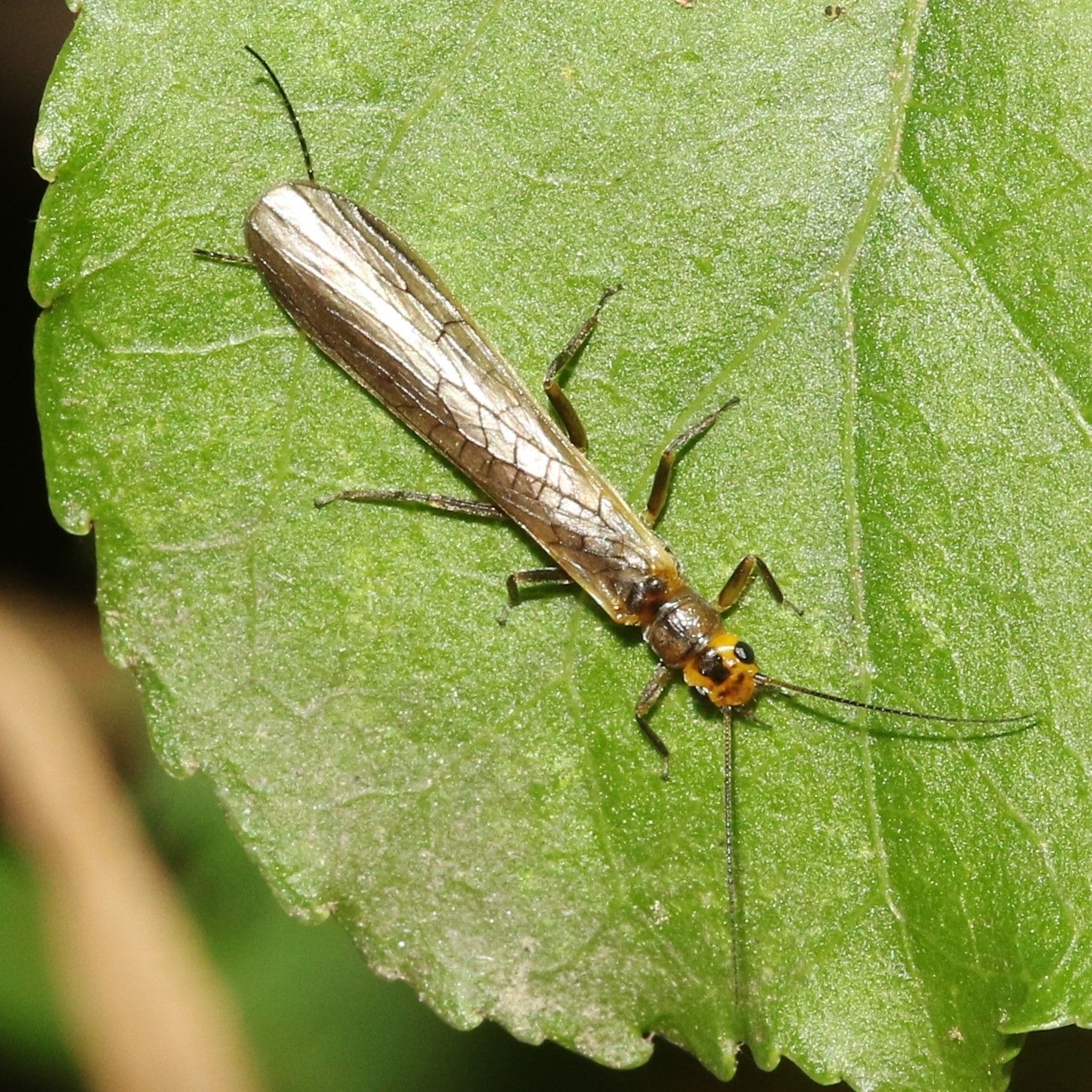

Scientific classification
- Kingdom: Animalia
- Phylum: Arthropoda
- Class: Insecta
- Order: Plecoptera
- Family: Perlidae
- Subfamily: Acroneuriinae
- Genus: Perlinella
- Species: P. ephyre

Binomial name
- Perlinella ephyre (Newman, 1839)

Synonyms
- Perlinella fumipennis (Walsh, 1862)

= Perlinella ephyre =

Species of stonefly

Perlinella ephyre, the vernal stone, is a species of common stonefly in the family Perlidae. It is found in North America.
