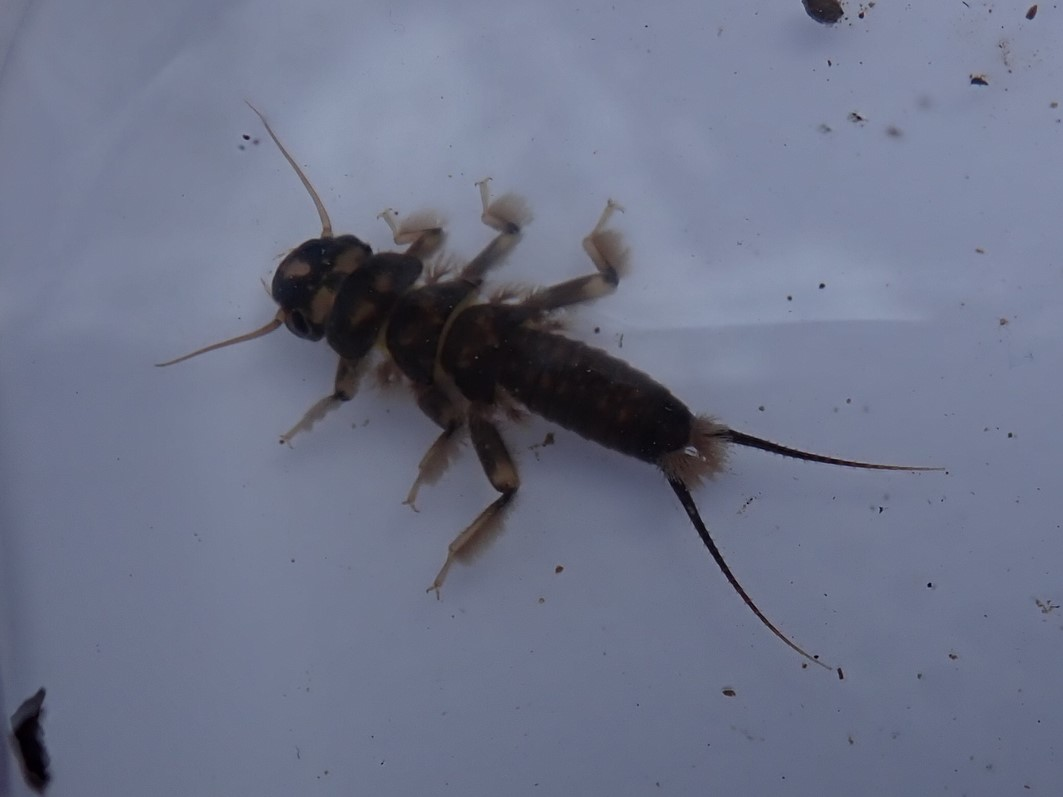

Scientific classification
- Domain: Eukaryota
- Kingdom: Animalia
- Phylum: Arthropoda
- Class: Insecta
- Order: Plecoptera
- Family: Perlidae
- Subfamily: Acroneuriinae
- Genus: Hesperoperla
- Species: H. pacifica

Binomial name
- Hesperoperla pacifica (Banks, 1900)

Synonyms
- Acroneuria pacifica Banks, 1900

= Hesperoperla pacifica =

Species of stonefly

Hesperoperla pacifica, the golden stonefly, is a species of common stonefly in the family Perlidae. It is found in North America. Its nymph is distinguished from other perlids by a pale, hourglass-shaped mark on its head.
