= Perlesta nitida =

Scientific classification
- Domain: Eukaryota
- Kingdom: Animalia
- Phylum: Arthropoda
- Class: Insecta
- Order: Plecoptera
- Family: Perlidae
- Subfamily: Acroneuriinae
- Genus: Perlesta
- Species: P. nitida

Binomial name
- Perlesta nitida Banks, 1948

Species of stonefly

Perlesta nitida, the tiny stone, is a species of common stonefly in the family Perlidae. It is found in North America.
