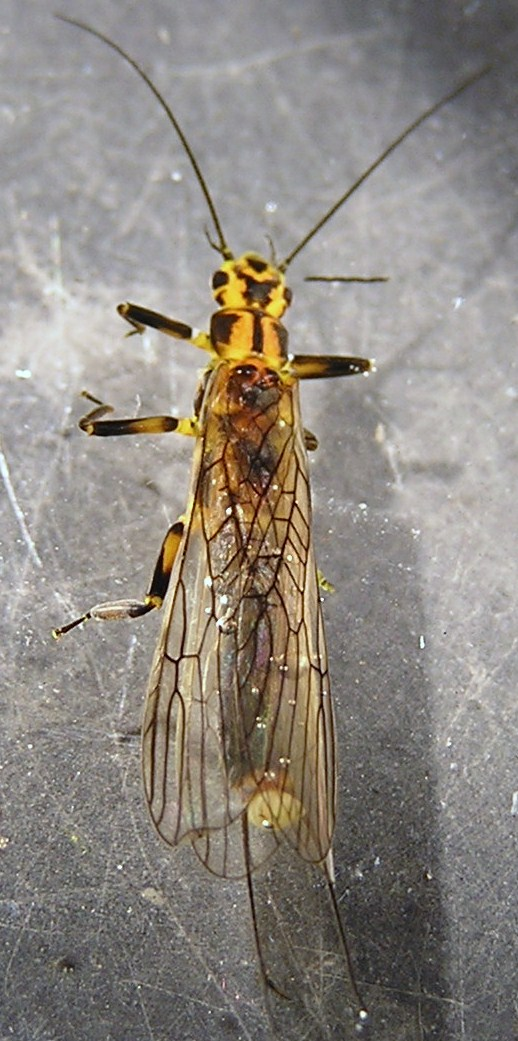

Scientific classification
- Domain: Eukaryota
- Kingdom: Animalia
- Phylum: Arthropoda
- Class: Insecta
- Order: Plecoptera
- Family: Perlidae
- Subfamily: Acroneuriinae
- Genus: Perlinella
- Species: P. drymo

Binomial name
- Perlinella drymo (Newman, 1839)

= Perlinella drymo =

Species of stonefly

Perlinella drymo, the striped stone, is a species of common stonefly in the family Perlidae. It is found in North America.
