= Perlesta xube =

Scientific classification
- Domain: Eukaryota
- Kingdom: Animalia
- Phylum: Arthropoda
- Class: Insecta
- Order: Plecoptera
- Family: Perlidae
- Subfamily: Acroneuriinae
- Genus: Perlesta
- Species: P. xube

Binomial name
- Perlesta xube Stark & Rhodes, 1997

Species of stonefly

Perlesta xube, the Pawnee stone, is a species of common stonefly in the family Perlidae. It is found in North America.
