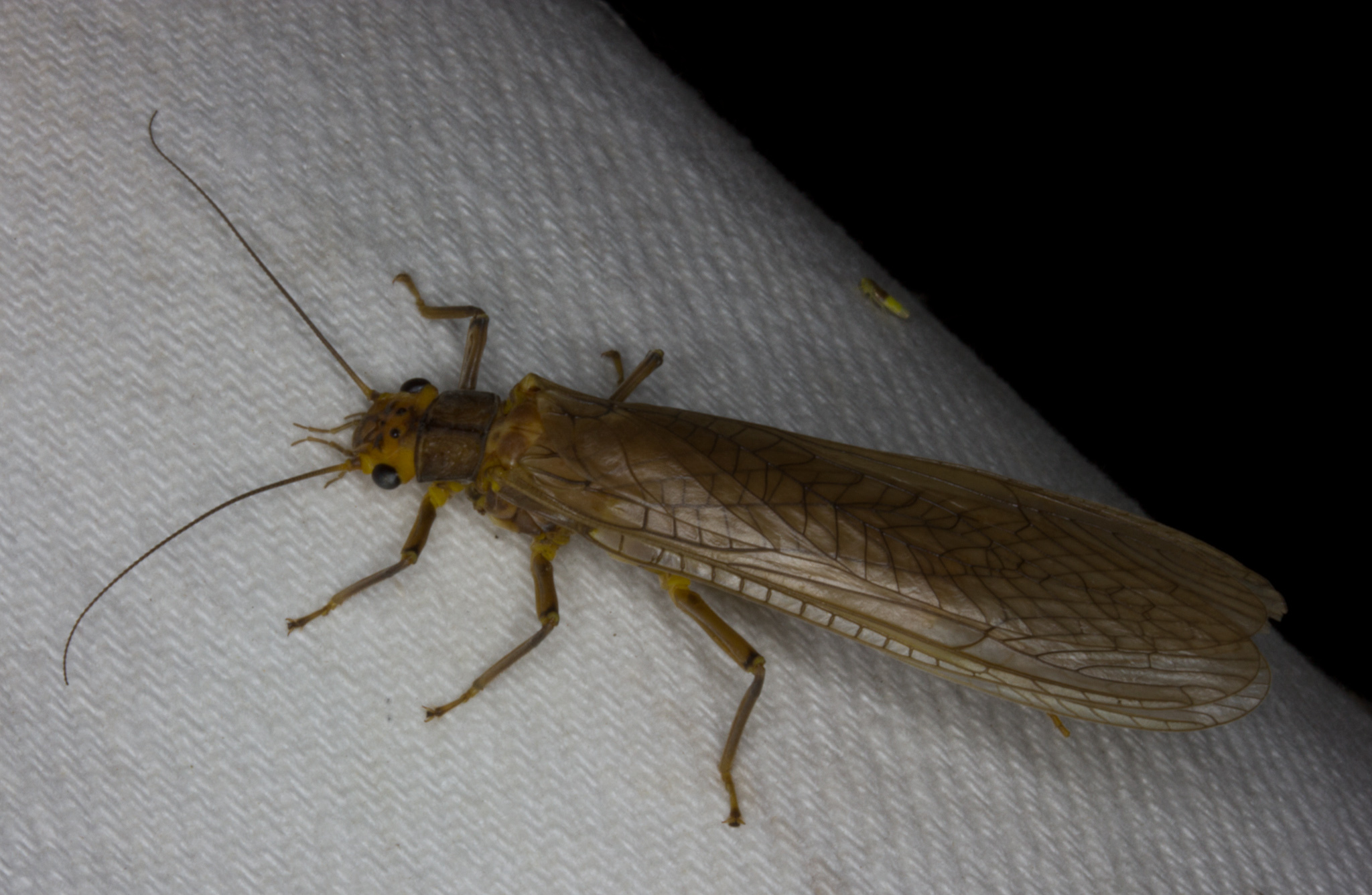

Scientific classification
- Domain: Eukaryota
- Kingdom: Animalia
- Phylum: Arthropoda
- Class: Insecta
- Order: Plecoptera
- Family: Perlidae
- Subfamily: Acroneuriinae
- Genus: Attaneuria; Ricker, 1954
- Species: A. ruralis

Binomial name
- Attaneuria ruralis (Hagen, 1861)

= Attaneuria =

Attaneuria ruralis

Genus of stoneflies

Attaneuria is a genus of common stoneflies in the family Perlidae. It is monotypic, being represented by the single species, Attaneuria ruralis.
