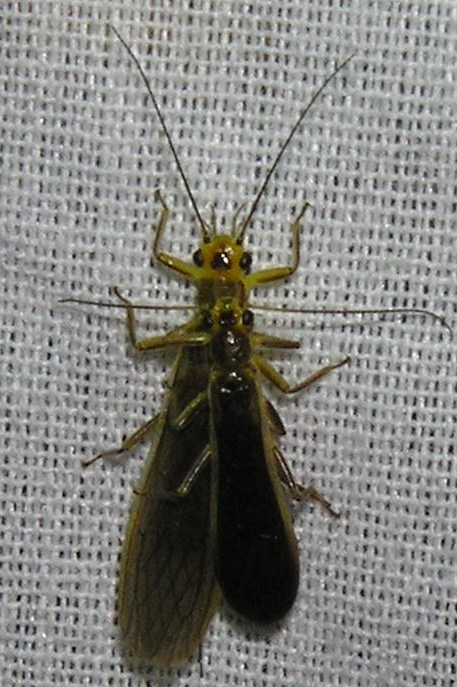
- Perlesta decipiens

Scientific classification
- Domain: Eukaryota
- Kingdom: Animalia
- Phylum: Arthropoda
- Class: Insecta
- Order: Plecoptera
- Family: Perlidae
- Subfamily: Acroneuriinae
- Genus: Perlesta; Banks, 1906

= Perlesta =

Genus of stoneflies

Perlesta is a genus of common stoneflies in the family Perlidae. There are more than 30 described species in Perlesta.

== Species ==
These 33 species belong to the genus Perlesta:

- Perlesta adena Stark, 1989
- Perlesta armitagei Grubbs & DeWalt, 2018
- Perlesta baumanni Stark, 1989
- Perlesta beatyi Kondratieff, Zuellig & Lenat, 2011
- Perlesta bjostadi Kondratieff & Lenat, 2006
- Perlesta bolukta Stark, 1989
- Perlesta browni Stark, 1989
- Perlesta chaoi Wu, 1948
- Perlesta cinctipes (Banks, 1905)
- Perlesta cranshawi Kondratieff & Kirchner, 2006
- Perlesta dakota Kondratieff & Baumann, 1999
- Perlesta decipiens (Walsh, 1862)
- Perlesta durfeei Kondratieff, Zuellig & Kirchner, 2008
- Perlesta ephelida Grubbs & DeWalt, 2012
- Perlesta etnieri Kondratieff & Kirchner, 2002
- Perlesta frisoni Banks, 1948
- Perlesta fusca Poulton & Stewart, 1991
- Perlesta georgiae Kondratieff, Zuellig & Lenat, 2008
- Perlesta golconda DeWalt & Stark, 1998
- Perlesta lagoi Stark, 1989
- Perlesta leathermani Kondratieff & Zuellig, 2006
- Perlesta mihucorum Kondratieff & Myers, 2011
- Perlesta nelsoni Stark, 1989 (pale stone)
- Perlesta nitida Banks, 1948 (tiny stone)
- Perlesta ouabache Grubbs & DeWalt, 2011
- Perlesta placida (Hagen, 1861)
- Perlesta puttmanni Kondratieff & Kirchner, 2003
- Perlesta roblei Kondratieff & Kirchner, 2003
- Perlesta shawnee Grubbs, 2005
- Perlesta shubuta Stark, 1989
- Perlesta spatulata Wu, 1938
- Perlesta teaysia Kirchner & Kondratieff, 1997
- Perlesta xube Stark & Rhodes, 1997 (Pawnee stone)
