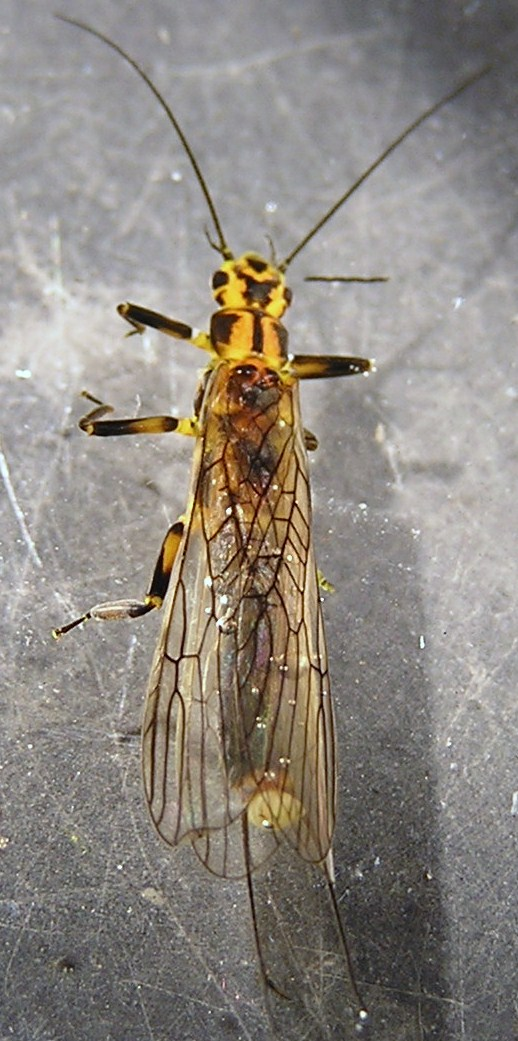
- Perlinella drymo

Scientific classification
- Domain: Eukaryota
- Kingdom: Animalia
- Phylum: Arthropoda
- Class: Insecta
- Order: Plecoptera
- Family: Perlidae
- Subfamily: Acroneuriinae
- Genus: Perlinella; Banks, 1900

Synonyms
- Atoperla Banks, 1905

= Perlinella =

Genus of stoneflies

Perlinella is a genus of common stoneflies in the family Perlidae. There are at least three described species in Perlinella.

== Species ==
These three species belong to the genus Perlinella:

- Perlinella drymo (Newman, 1839) (striped stone)
- Perlinella ephyre (Newman, 1839) (vernal stone)
- Perlinella zwicki Kondratieff, Kirchner & Stewart, 1988
