= Doroneuria =

Scientific classification
- Domain: Eukaryota
- Kingdom: Animalia
- Phylum: Arthropoda
- Class: Insecta
- Order: Plecoptera
- Family: Perlidae
- Subfamily: Acroneuriinae
- Genus: Doroneuria; Needham & Claassen, 1925

Genus of stoneflies

Doroneuria is a genus of common stoneflies in the family Perlidae. There are at least two described species in Doroneuria.

== Species ==
These two species belong to the genus Doroneuria:

- Doroneuria baumanni Stark & Gaufin, 1974 (cascades stone)
- Doroneuria theodora (Needham & Claassen, 1922)
