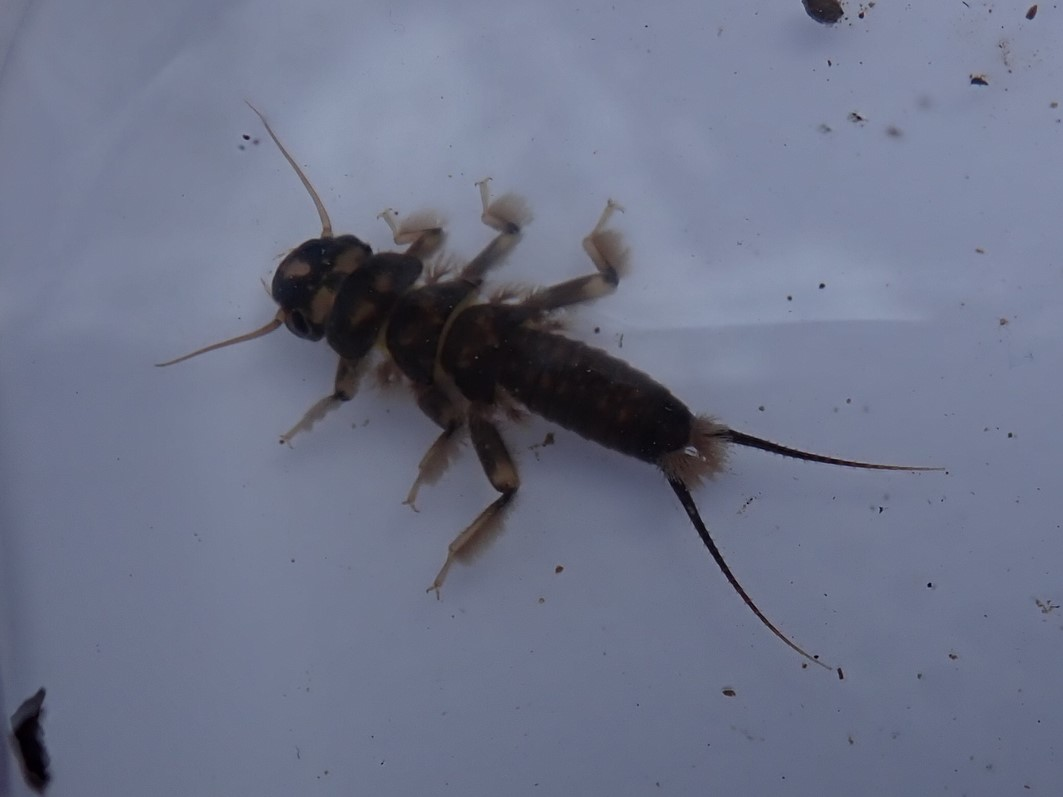
- Hesperoperla pacifica

Scientific classification
- Domain: Eukaryota
- Kingdom: Animalia
- Phylum: Arthropoda
- Class: Insecta
- Order: Plecoptera
- Family: Perlidae
- Subfamily: Acroneuriinae
- Genus: Hesperoperla; Banks, 1938

= Hesperoperla =

Genus of stoneflies

Hesperoperla is a genus of common stoneflies in the family Perlidae. There are at least two described species in Hesperoperla.

== Species ==
These two species belong to the genus Hesperoperla:

- Hesperoperla hoguei Baumann & Stark, 1980 (banded stone)
- Hesperoperla pacifica (Banks, 1900) (golden stonefly)
