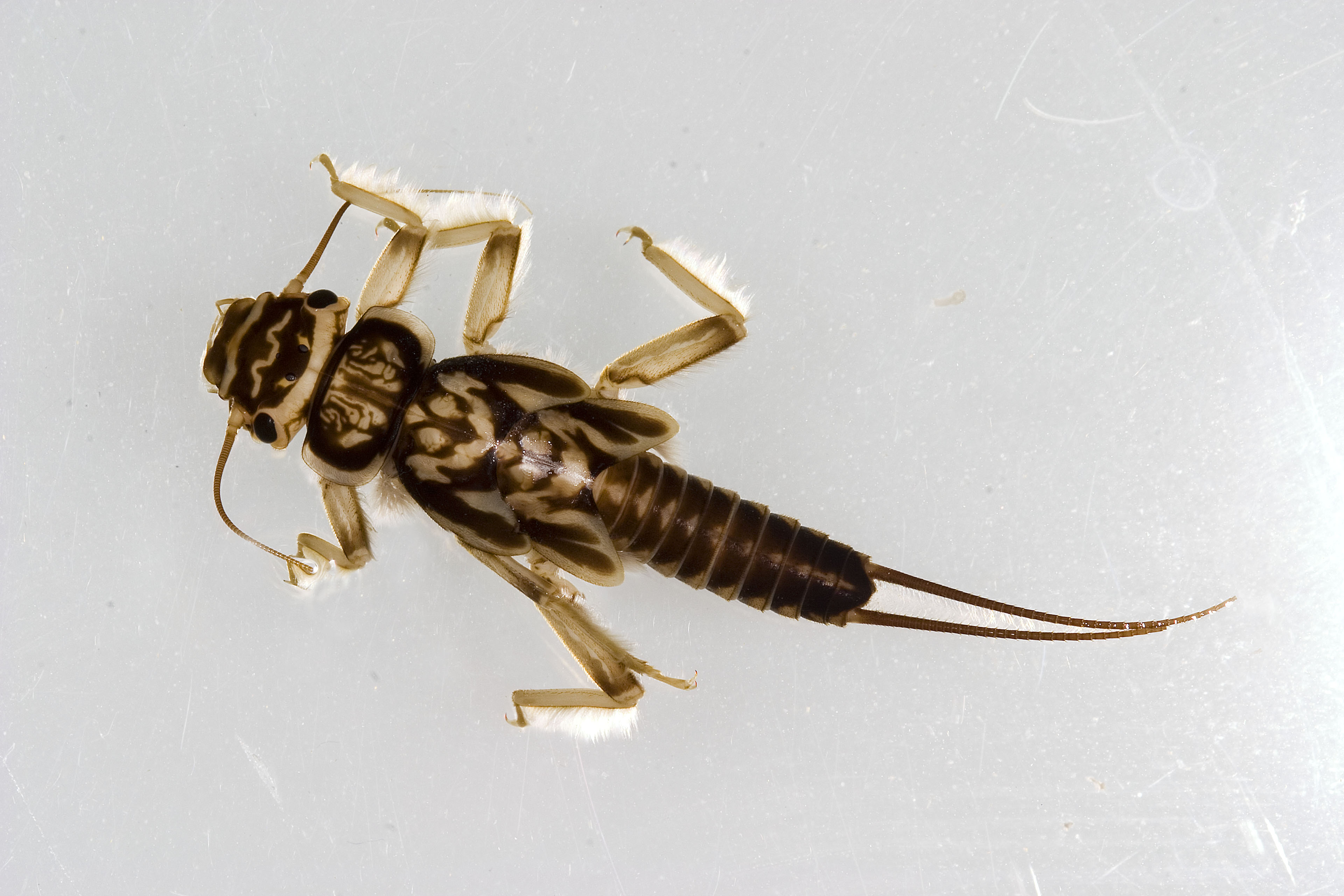
- Acroneuria abnormis

Scientific classification
- Domain: Eukaryota
- Kingdom: Animalia
- Phylum: Arthropoda
- Class: Insecta
- Order: Plecoptera
- Family: Perlidae
- Subfamily: Acroneuriinae

= Acroneuriinae =

Subfamily of stoneflies

Acroneuriinae is a subfamily of common stoneflies in the family Perlidae. There are about 32 genera and about 520 described species in Acroneuriinae.

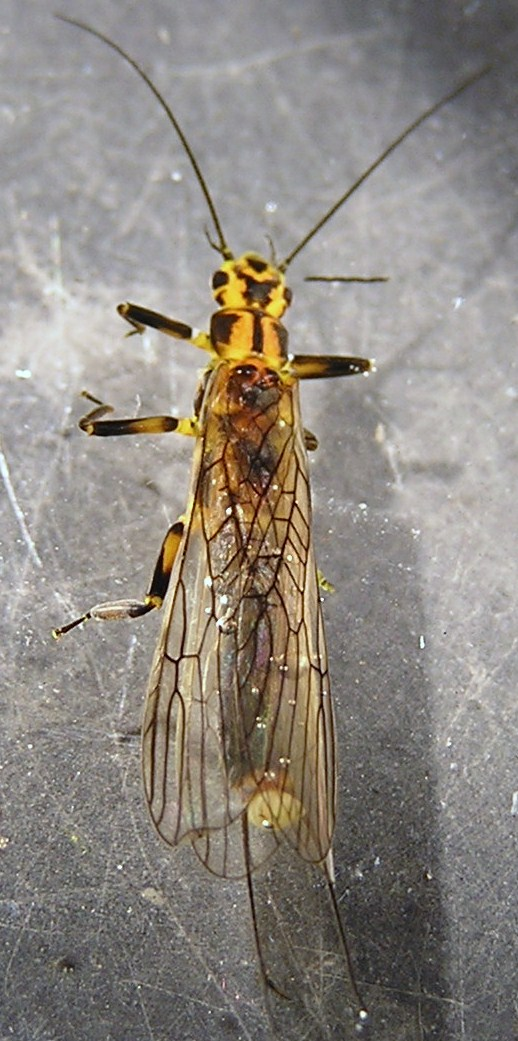
Perlinella drymo

== Genera ==
These 11 genera belong to the subfamily Acroneuriinae.

- Acroneuria Pictet, 1841
- Anacroneuria Klapálek, 1909
- Attaneuria Ricker, 1954
- Beloneuria Needham and Claassen, 1925
- Calineuria Ricker, 1954
- Doroneuria Needham & Claassen, 1925
- Eccoptura Klapálek, 1921
- Hansonoperla Nelson, 1979
- Hesperoperla Banks, 1938
- Perlesta Banks, 1906
- Perlinella Banks, 1900
