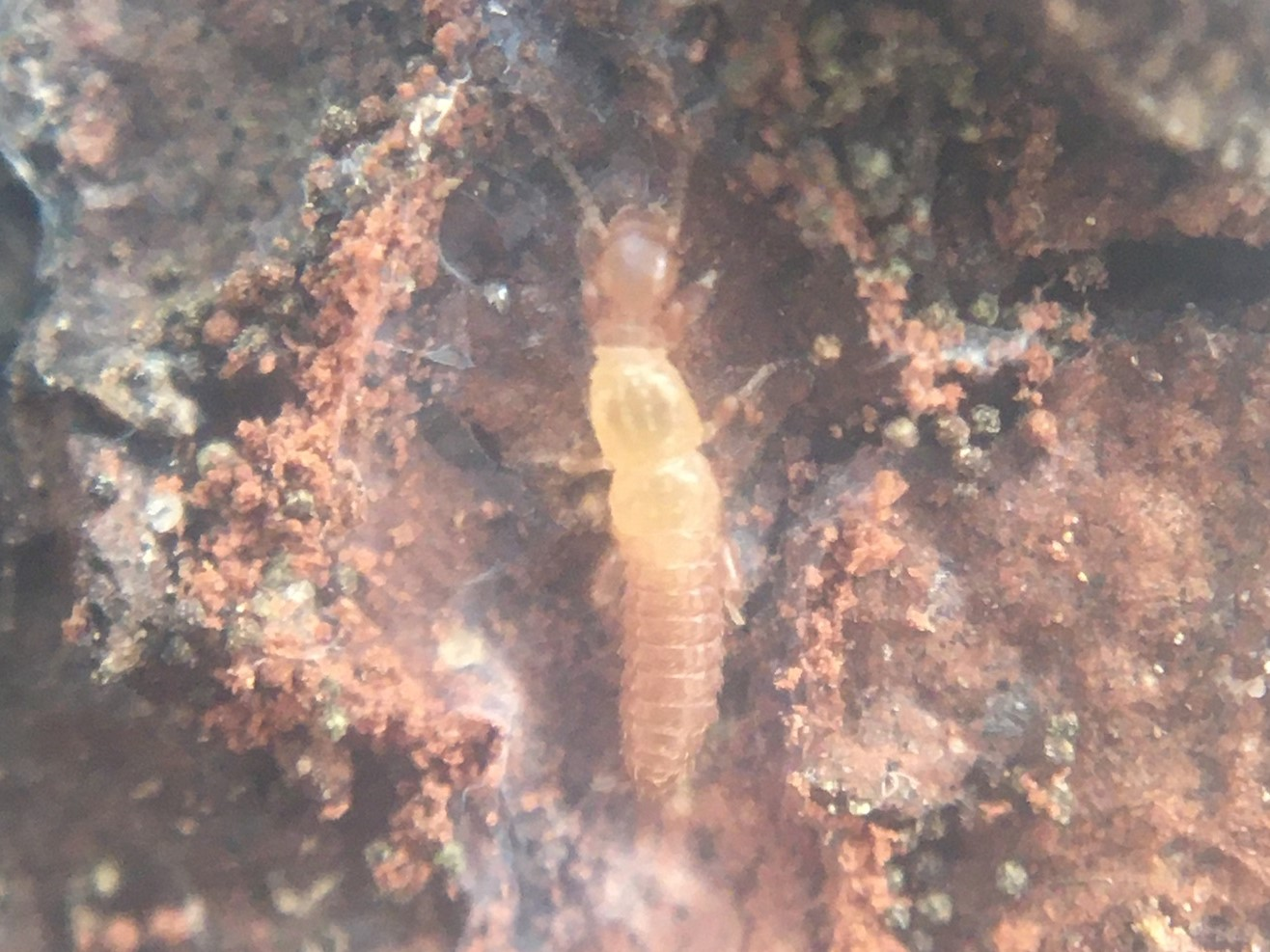

Scientific classification
- Domain: Eukaryota
- Kingdom: Animalia
- Phylum: Arthropoda
- Class: Insecta
- Order: Embioptera
- Family: Teratembiidae
- Genus: Diradius
- Species: D. vandykei

Binomial name
- Diradius vandykei (Ross, 1944)

= Diradius vandykei =

Species of insect

Diradius vandykei is a species of webspinner in the family Teratembiidae. It is found in North America.
