= Anisembia =

Scientific classification
- Domain: Eukaryota
- Kingdom: Animalia
- Phylum: Arthropoda
- Class: Insecta
- Order: Embioptera
- Family: Anisembiidae
- Genus: Anisembia; Krauss, 1911
- Species: A. texana

Binomial name
- Anisembia texana (Melander, 1902)

Genus of insects

Anisembia is a genus of insect in the family Anisembiidae, a family of webspinners. There is at least one described species in Anisembia, A. texana, discovered by Krauss in 1911.
