= Scelembiidae =

Scientific classification
- Kingdom: Animalia
- Phylum: Arthropoda
- Class: Insecta
- Order: Embioptera
- Suborder: Euembiodea
- Family: Scelembiidae; Ross, 2001

Family of insects

Scelembiidae is a family of webspinners in the order Embioptera. There are 12 extant genera and some 40 described species in Scelembiidae.

== Genera ==
- Ambonembia Ross, 2001
- Biguembia Szumik, 1997
- Chirembia Davis, 1940
- Dolonembia Ross, 2001
- Gibocercus Szumik, 1997
- Litosembia Ross, 2001
- Malacosembia Ross, 2001
- Ochrembia Ross, 2001
- Olyntha Gray, 1832
- Pararhagadochir Davis, 1940
- Rhagadochir Enderlein, 1912
- Xiphosembia Ross, 2001
- †Kumarembia Engel & Grimaldi, 2011
- †Lithembia Ross, 1984
- †Multivena Lai, Yang, & Zhang, 2022
- †Parasorellembia Anisyutkin & Perkovsky, 2022
- †Sorellembia Engel & Grimaldi, 2006
