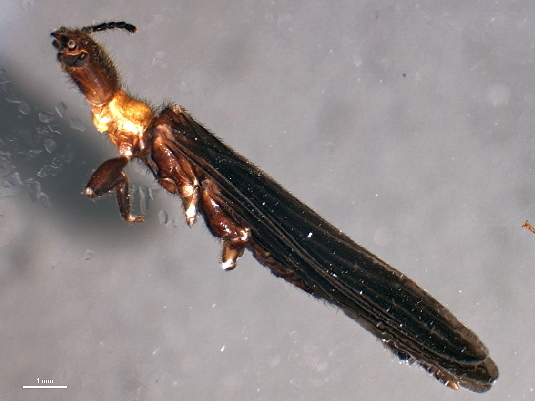
- Antipaluria urichi

Scientific classification
- Kingdom: Animalia
- Phylum: Arthropoda
- Clade: Pancrustacea
- Class: Insecta
- Order: Embioptera
- Suborder: Clothododea
- Infraorder: Clothodomorpha
- Family: Clothodidae; Enderlein, 1909

= Clothodidae =

Family of insects

Clothodidae is a family of webspinners in the order Embioptera. There are about 8 genera and 25 described species in Clothodidae.

== Genera ==
These eight genera belong to the family Clothodidae:

- Subfamily Clothodinae Enderlein, 1909

- Antipaluria Enderlein, 1912
- Chromatoclothoda Ross, 1987
- Clothoda Enderlein, 1909
- Cryptoclothoda Ross, 1987
- Nonaia Engel, 2020
- †Henoclothoda Cui & Engel, 2020

- Subfamily †Atmetoclothodinae Engel & Huang, 2016

- †Atmetoclothoda Engel & Huang, 2016

- Subfamily †Gnethodinae Cui & Engel, 2020

- †Gnethoda Cui & Engel, 2020
