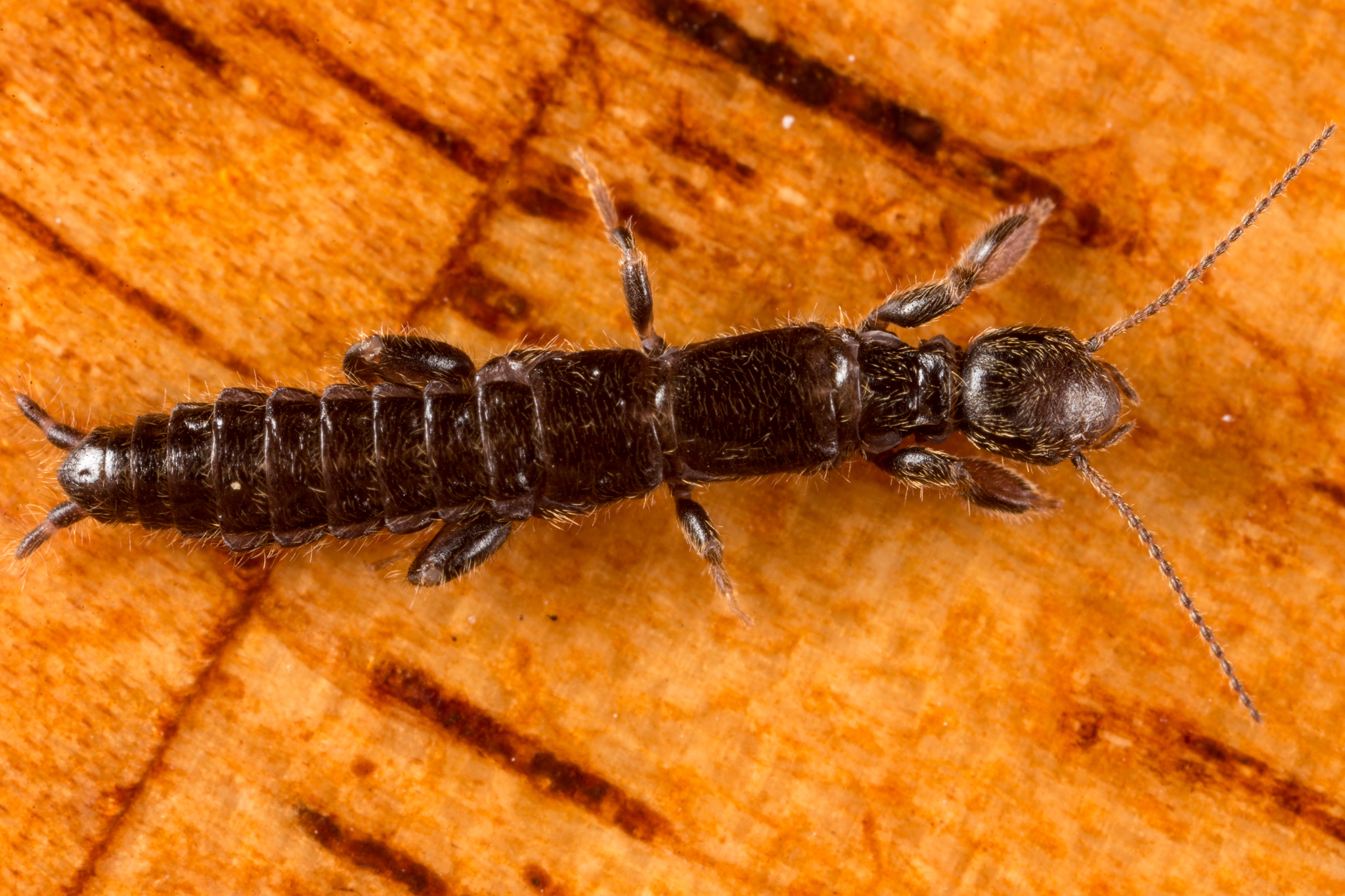
- Metoligotoma tasmanica

Scientific classification
- Kingdom: Animalia
- Phylum: Arthropoda
- Class: Insecta
- Order: Embioptera
- Suborder: Euembiodea
- Family: Australembiidae; Ross, 1963

= Australembiidae =

Family of insects

Australembiidae is a family of webspinners in the order Embioptera. There is at least one genus, Metoligotoma, in the family Australembiidae. In this family, both males and females in all species are wingless.
