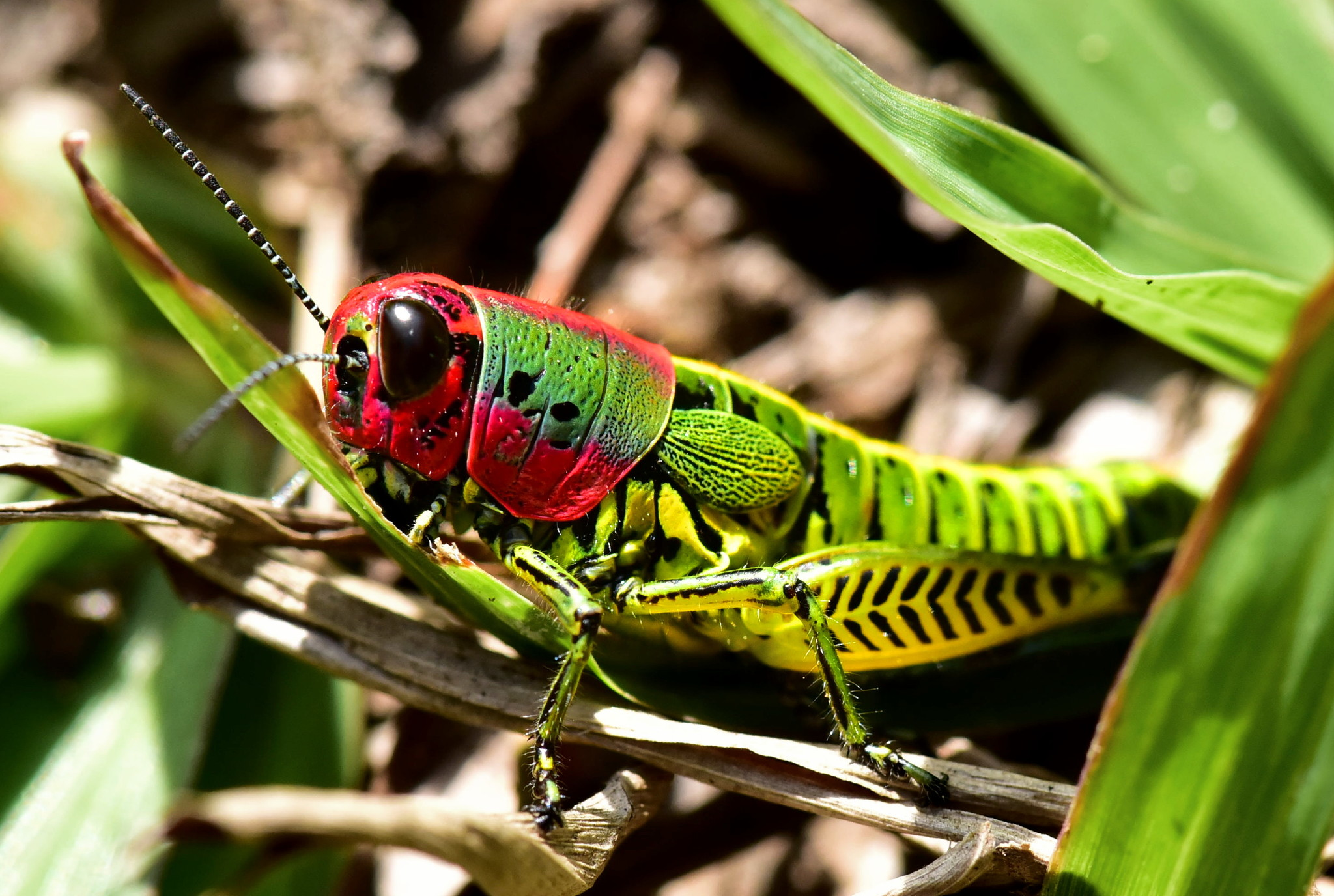
- Aztecacris laevis

Scientific classification
- Kingdom: Animalia
- Phylum: Arthropoda
- Class: Insecta
- Order: Orthoptera
- Suborder: Caelifera
- Family: Acrididae
- Subfamily: Melanoplinae
- Tribe: Dactylotini
- Genus: Aztecacris; Roberts, 1947

Type species
- Perixerus laevis Rehn, 1900

= Aztecacris =

Genus of grasshoppers

Aztecacris is a genus of spur-throated grasshoppers in the family Acrididae. It occurs in Mexico and Southwestern United States.

== Species ==
These three species belong to the genus Aztecacris:

- Aztecacris gloriosa (Hebard, 1935) (Atascosa gem grasshopper)
- Aztecacris laevis (Rehn, J.A.G., 1900)
- Aztecacris variabilis (Rehn, J.A.G., 1904)
