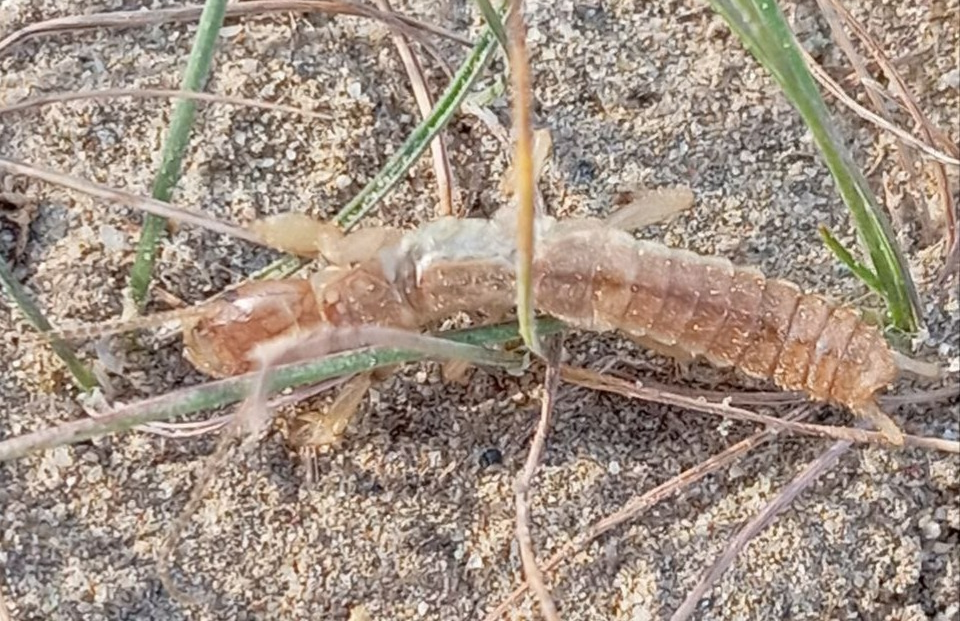
- Webspinner Uranembia rivkusi endemic to Uzbekistan

Scientific classification
- Kingdom: Animalia
- Phylum: Arthropoda
- Clade: Pancrustacea
- Class: Insecta
- Order: Embioptera
- Suborder: Euembiodea
- Family: Paedembiidae; Ross, 2006

= Paedembiidae =

Family of insects

Paedembiidae is a family of webspinners in the order Embioptera. There are at least three genera and three described species in Paedembiidae.

== Genera ==
These three genera belong to the family Paedembiidae:

- Badkhyzembia Gorochov & Anisyutkin, 2006 — Turkmenistan
- Paedembia Ross, 2006 — Afghanistan
- Uranembia Blyummer, 2017 — Uzbekistan
