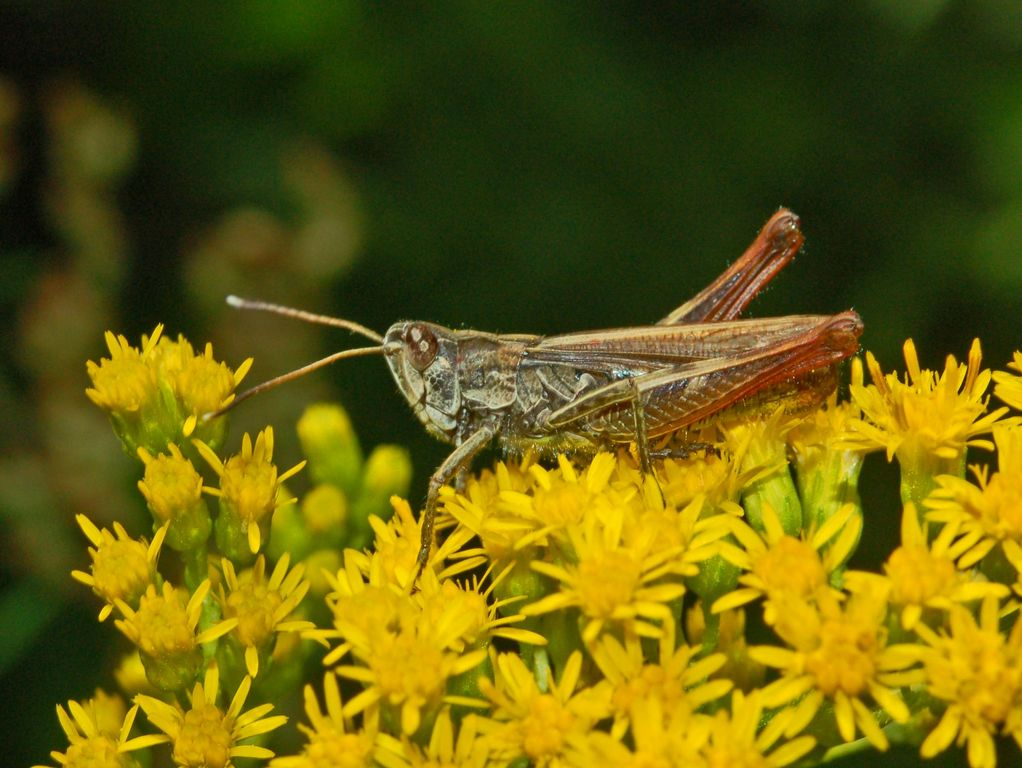
- Gomphocerippus rufus. Male

Scientific classification
- Domain: Eukaryota
- Kingdom: Animalia
- Phylum: Arthropoda
- Class: Insecta
- Order: Orthoptera
- Suborder: Caelifera
- Family: Acrididae
- Tribe: Gomphocerini
- Genus: Gomphocerippus; Roberts, 1941

Type species
- Gryllus (Locusta) rufus Linnaeus, 1758

= Gomphocerippus =

Genus of grasshoppers

Gomphocerippus is a genus of Palearctic grasshoppers belonging to the tribe Gomphocerini.

== Species ==
The Orthoptera Species File lists:

- Gomphocerippus longipennis Li & Ren, 2016
- Gomphocerippus rufus (Linnaeus, 1758) - type species
