= Diradius =

Scientific classification
- Domain: Eukaryota
- Kingdom: Animalia
- Phylum: Arthropoda
- Class: Insecta
- Order: Embioptera
- Family: Teratembiidae
- Genus: Diradius; Friederichs, 1934

Genus of insects

Diradius is a genus of webspinners in the family Teratembiidae. There are about 15 described species in Diradius.

== Species ==
These 15 species belong to the genus Diradius:

- Diradius caribbeana (Ross, 1944)
- Diradius chiapae (Ross, 1944)
- Diradius diversilobus Ross, 1984
- Diradius emarginatus (Ross, 1944)
- Diradius erba Szumik, 1991
- Diradius excisa (Ross, 1944)
- Diradius fairchildi Ross, 1992
- Diradius jalapae (Ross, 1944)
- Diradius lobatus (Ross, 1944)
- Diradius nouges Szumik, 2001
- Diradius pacificus (Ross, 1940)
- Diradius pallidus Ross, 1984
- Diradius pusillus Friederichs, 1934
- Diradius uxpanapaensis (Mariño & Márquez, 1982)
- Diradius vandykei (Ross, 1944)
