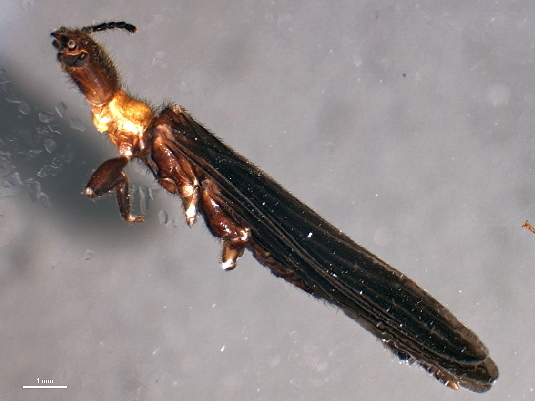
- Antipaluria urichi

Scientific classification
- Kingdom: Animalia
- Phylum: Arthropoda
- Clade: Pancrustacea
- Class: Insecta
- Order: Embioptera
- Family: Clothodidae
- Genus: Antipaluria; Enderlein, 1912

= Antipaluria =

Genus of insects

Antipaluria is a genus of webspinners in the family Clothodidae. There are seven described species in Antipaluria. They are native to the Caribbean region, Central America and the northern part of South America.

== Species ==
These seven species belong to the genus Antipaluria:

- Antipaluria aequicercata Enderlein, 1912
- Antipaluria caribbeana Ross, 1987
- Antipaluria intermedia (Davis, 1939)
- Antipaluria marginata Ross, 1987
- Antipaluria panamensis Ross, 1987
- Antipaluria silvestris Ross, 1987
- Antipaluria urichi (Saussure, 1896)
