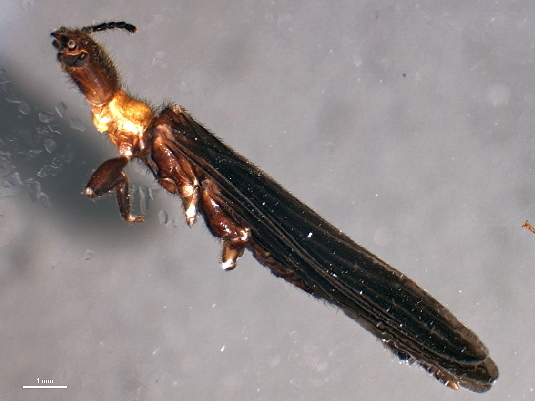

Scientific classification
- Domain: Eukaryota
- Kingdom: Animalia
- Phylum: Arthropoda
- Class: Insecta
- Order: Embioptera
- Family: Clothodidae
- Genus: Antipaluria
- Species: A. urichi

Binomial name
- Antipaluria urichi (Saussure, 1896)

Synonyms
- Clothoda urichi (Saussure, 1896); Olyntha urichi (Saussure, 1896); Embia urichi Saussure, 1896

= Antipaluria urichi =

Species of insect

Antipaluria urichi is a species of webspinner in the family Clothodidae. It is found in the Caribbean region and South America, the type locality being the island of Trinidad.

== Behaviour ==
Like other webspinners, Antipaluria urichi typically lives in colonies consisting of adult females and their young, protected under a silken web. Adult males have wings and seek out females, but do not feed and are short-lived. The web is spun from silk produced by glands on the insects' tarsi. It provides a waterproof covering for the insects during tropical downpours. It also reduces predation, and may prevent desiccation in bright sunshine.

Females do not have wings and are normally gregarious; young females do not show territoriality or elicit behaviours designed to drive away others of their kind. However, breeding females with clusters of eggs maintain maternal territories. They signal to intruders, especially female ones, by postural and vibratory means such as shaking their bodies and lunging, and the intruder usually moves away.

Maternal care starts with the mother standing astride the egg cluster and preventing egg parasitoids from parasitising them. After the eggs hatch, the mother stays with the nymphs and provides silk to protect them. Predators of this webspinner include ants, spiders, geckos and birds. They are particularly vulnerable when they leave the webbing and forage elsewhere, and they are also vulnerable when there are holes or tears in the webbing through which ants and spiders can enter. The females do not attempt to protect their young from ants, instead fleeing.
