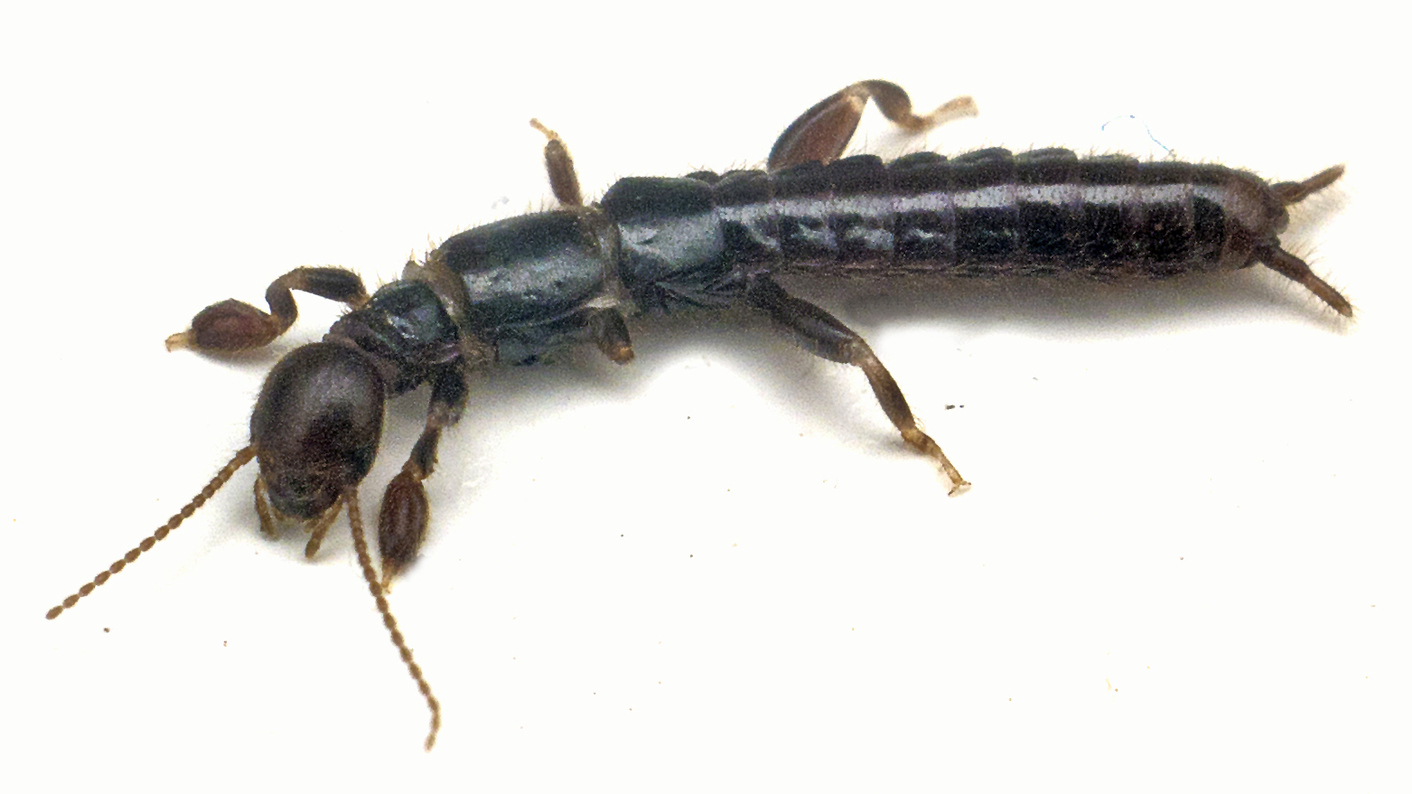

Scientific classification
- Kingdom: Animalia
- Phylum: Arthropoda
- Clade: Pancrustacea
- Class: Insecta
- Order: Embioptera
- Family: Notoligotomidae
- Genus: Notoligotoma
- Species: N. nitens

Binomial name
- Notoligotoma nitens Davis 1936

= Notoligotoma nitens =

Species of insect

Notoligotoma nitens is a species of insect webspinners of the family Notoligotomidae. It was described by Australian entomologist Consett Davis in 1936. The species is found from Victoria to Queensland.
