= Anisembiidae =

Scientific classification
- Kingdom: Animalia
- Phylum: Arthropoda
- Class: Insecta
- Order: Embioptera
- Family: Anisembiidae; Davis, 1940

Family of insects

Anisembiidae is a family of insects in the order Embioptera, the web-spinners. The family is divided into several subfamilies. It is the largest family of webspinners.

Its subfamilies include the following:

- Anisembiinae
- Aporembiinae
- Chelicercinae
- Chorisembiinae
- Cryptembiinae
- Platyembiinae
- Scolembiinae

Its genera include the following:

- Anisembia Krauss, 1911
- Aporembia Ross, 2003
- Brasilembia Ross, 2003
- Bulbocerca Ross, 1940
- Chelicerca Ross, 1940
- Chorisembia Ross, 2003
- Cryptembia Ross, 2003
- Dactylocerca Ross, 1940
- Ectyphocerca Ross, 2003
- Exochosembia Ross, 2003
- Glyphembia Ross, 2003
- Isosembia Ross, 2003
- Mesembia Ross, 1940
- Microembia Ross, 1944
- Oncosembia Ross, 2003
- Pelorembia Ross, 1984
- Phallosembia Ross, 2003
- Platyembia Ross, 2003
- Pogonembia Ross, 2003
- Saussurembia Davis, 1940
- Schizembia Ross, 1944
- Scolembia Ross, 2003
- † Poinarembia Ross, 2003
- † Stenembia Ross, 1972
