= Andesembiidae =

Scientific classification
- Domain: Eukaryota
- Kingdom: Animalia
- Phylum: Arthropoda
- Class: Insecta
- Order: Embioptera
- Suborder: Euembiodea
- Family: Andesembiidae; Ross, 2003

Family of insects

Andesembiidae is a family of webspinners--insects of the order Embioptera. There are at least two genera and about seven described species in Andesembiidae.

== Genera ==
These two genera belong to the family Andesembiidae:

- Andesembia Ross, 2003
- Bryonembia Ross, 2003
