= Archembiidae =

Scientific classification
- Kingdom: Animalia
- Phylum: Arthropoda
- Class: Insecta
- Order: Embioptera
- Suborder: Euembiodea
- Family: Archembiidae; Ross, 2001

Family of insects

Archembiidae is a family of webspinners in the order Embioptera.

== Genera ==
- Calamoclostes Enderlein, 1909
- Conicercembia Ross, 1984
- Ecuadembia Szumik, 2004
- Neorhagadochir Ross, 1944
- Pachylembia Ross, 1984
- † Archembia Ross, 1971
