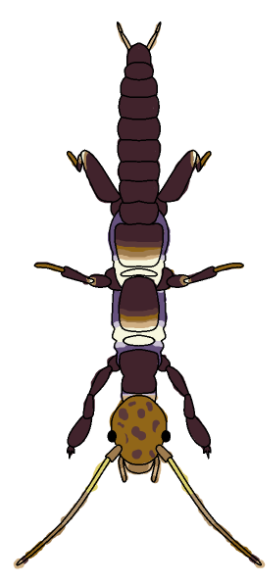

Scientific classification
- Kingdom: Animalia
- Phylum: Arthropoda
- Clade: Pancrustacea
- Class: Insecta
- Order: Embioptera
- Family: Scelembiidae
- Genus: Rhagadochir
- Species: R. virgo

Binomial name
- Rhagadochir virgo (Ross, 1960)

= Rhagadochir virgo =

Species of insect

The Ace webspinner (Rhagadochir virgo) is a species of webspinner, an insect in the order Embiidina, also known as Embioptera. This species is native to the Republic of the Congo in tropical West Africa.

== Ecology ==
Only females of this species have been found, and the insects reproduce asexually by parthenogenesis, earning the nickname "Ace webspinners". Perhaps because of their close inter-relatedness, these insects are notably gregarious, crowding together in their silken tunnels. The insects spin their silk in a co-ordinated fashion and may move to new quarters in an organised group, a behaviour not observed elsewhere among members of this order. A female will lay a batch of eggs and wrap them in silk, often incorporating lichen pieces into the silk covering, which may be a form of providing food for the nymphs when they hatch.
