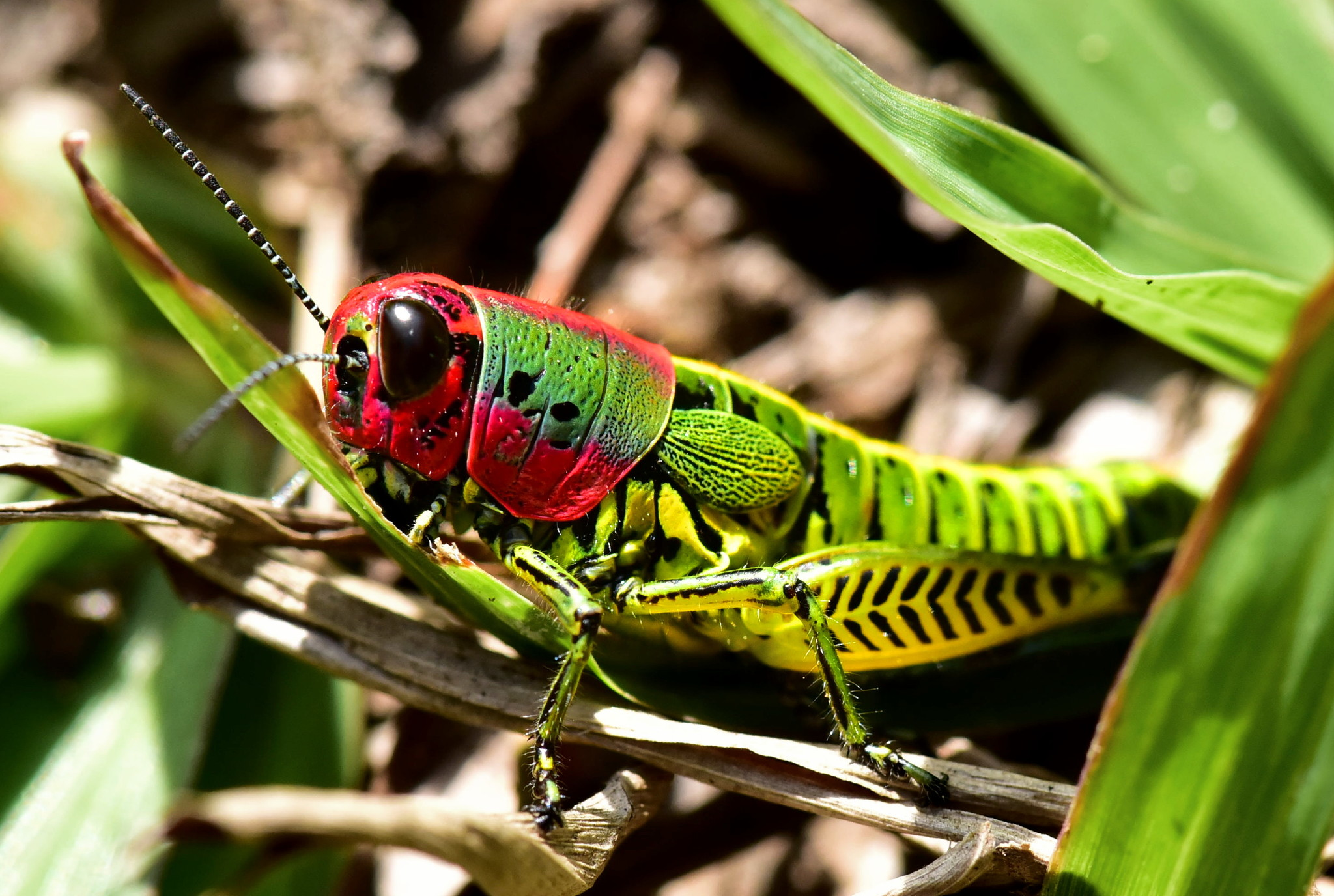
- Aztecacris laevis, Mexico

Scientific classification
- Kingdom: Animalia
- Phylum: Arthropoda
- Class: Insecta
- Order: Orthoptera
- Suborder: Caelifera
- Family: Acrididae
- Subfamily: Melanoplinae
- Tribe: Dactylotini
- Genus: Aztecacris
- Species: A. laevis

Binomial name
- Aztecacris laevis (Rehn, 1900)

Synonyms
- Perixerus laevis Rehn, 1900

= Aztecacris laevis =

Species of grasshopper

Aztecacris laevis is a species of spur-throated grasshopper in the family Acrididae. It is found in Mexico specifically in the highlands of central Mexico from Veracruz to Jalisco.
