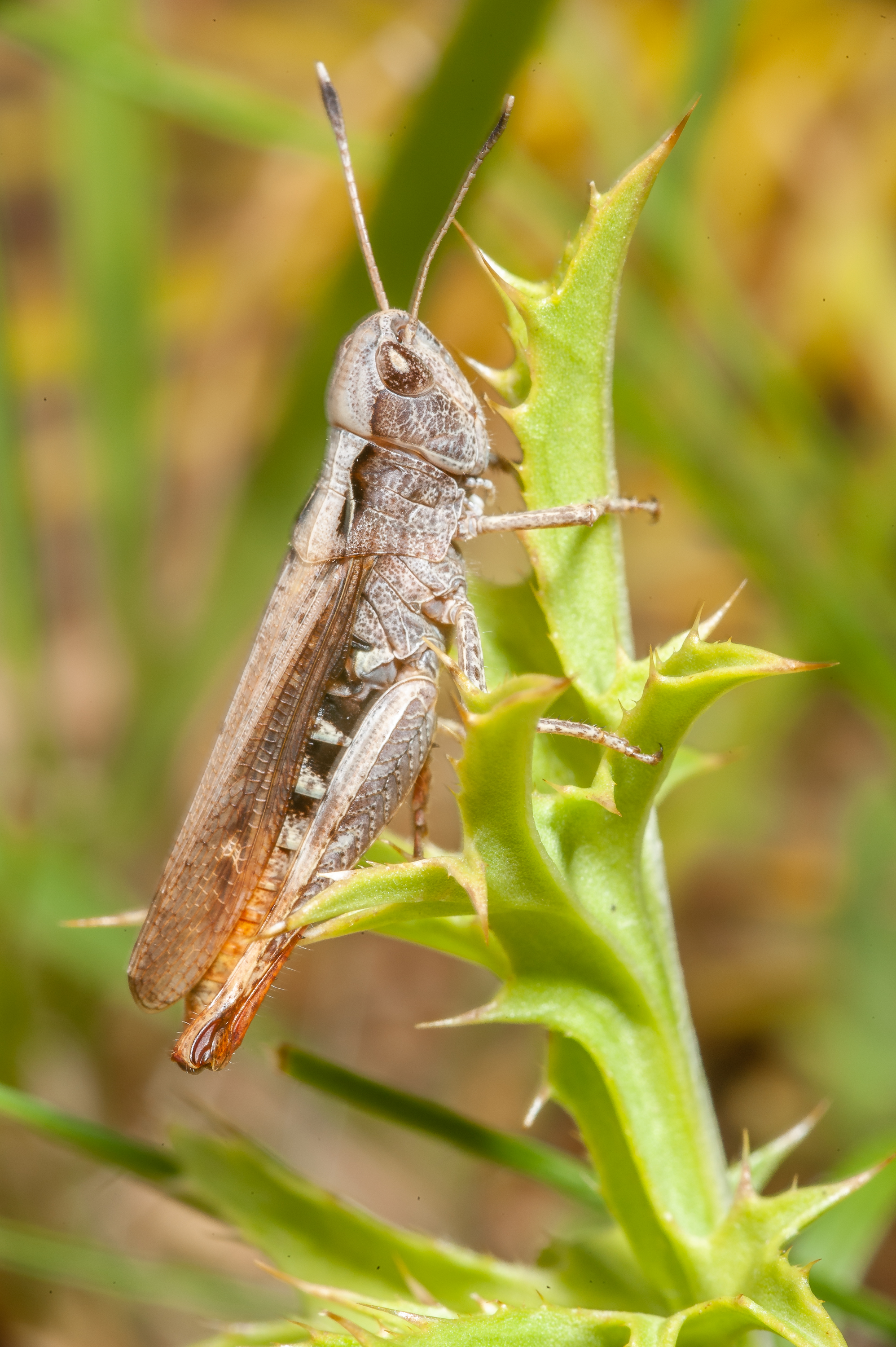

Scientific classification
- Kingdom: Animalia
- Phylum: Arthropoda
- Class: Insecta
- Order: Orthoptera
- Suborder: Caelifera
- Family: Acrididae
- Genus: Gomphocerippus
- Species: G. rufus

Binomial name
- Gomphocerippus rufus (Linnaeus, 1758)

Synonyms
- Acridium clavicorne De Geer, 1773; Gomphocerus rufus (Linnaeus, 1758); Gryllus rufus Linnaeus, 1758

= Rufous grasshopper =

Species of grasshopper

Close-Up of a Gomphocerippus rufus

The rufous grasshopper (Gomphocerippus rufus) is a species of grasshopper. It is a medium-sized, broad, brown, short-horned grasshopper with clubbed antennae that are tipped with a conspicuous white or pale colour. It is fairly large, averaging 14 to 22 mm in length. It is of the subfamily Gomphocerinae in the family Acrididae, the predominant family of grasshoppers. This species is present in most of Europe, in the eastern Palearctic realm, and in the Near East. It can be encountered from late July through mid-December, usually in dry or slightly moist habitats. The environments in which it typically resides include dry grassland on calcareous soils, sheltered valleys with scrub, and the open borders of forests. It feeds on grasses and various herbaceous plants. It is known for its distinctive courtship song and accompanying display.

== Physical characteristics ==
Males range from 14 to 16 mm, while females range from 17 to 22 mm. The coloration is usually shades of brown, but features some grey, yellow, and red. The mature male has an abdomen tipped with orange-red. The female has similar coloration, but it is much less pronounced than in males. Some females are reddish purple. The club on the antenna is distinct, flattened, expanded, and apical, or at the tip. The pronotum features a central seam. The wings are present in both sexes. The forewings are longer in the males, where they reach just beyond the primary joint of the hind legs, than in the females, where they fall short of this joint.

== Habitat ==
The rufous grasshopper is usually found in open land, particularly terrain such as meadows, pastures, and forest edges that feature tall grass. More specifically, it can often be found in chalk grassland. It has been found on southern slopes of the Alps up to approximately 8100 feet. It prefers warm environments of moisture levels ranging from dry to moist. Very common locations include regions of Europe, including Germany, Sweden, France, and the United Kingdom. In fact, it can be found across almost all of Europe and Asia, ranging from France to parts of Siberia and from Scandinavia to northern Germany.

These adept climbers prefer to avoid remaining on the ground, and instead perch on plants in sunny, elevated areas. As such they tend to live near herbaceous, taller plants and only by short plants infrequently. One situation that illustrates this preference well was the outbreak of the myxomatosis virus in rabbits in Britain in the 1950s. The rabbit population became severely depleted. As rabbits have the effect of cropping grass short to eat it, this decrease in the population led to less cropped grass. Some wildlife, such as the large blue butterfly, suffered immensely because of their dependence on short grass, but other organisms, like the rufous grasshopper, prospered because the lack of rabbits led to an increase in long grass.

Predators includes bats such as the greater mouse-eared bat.

== Diet ==
Grasshoppers in general, including this species, are herbivorous and subsist mainly on grasses. Scientists have gained knowledge of the diet of G. rufus through the use of feces as a source of DNA. It has been documented to eat plants of the genus Bromus, the species Holcus lanatus, and the subfamily Pooideae, all within the family Poaceae. Poaceae is a family of flowering monocots whose members are referred to as true grasses. Pooideae includes lawn grasses and cereals such as wheat and barley. Bromus is composed of grasses called brome grasses or cheat grasses. Holcus lanatus, more commonly known as Yorkshire fog or velvet grass, is a species of perennial pasture grass noted for its hairy texture. The rufous grasshopper has also been known to sparingly eat other plants such as rushes.

== Life cycle ==
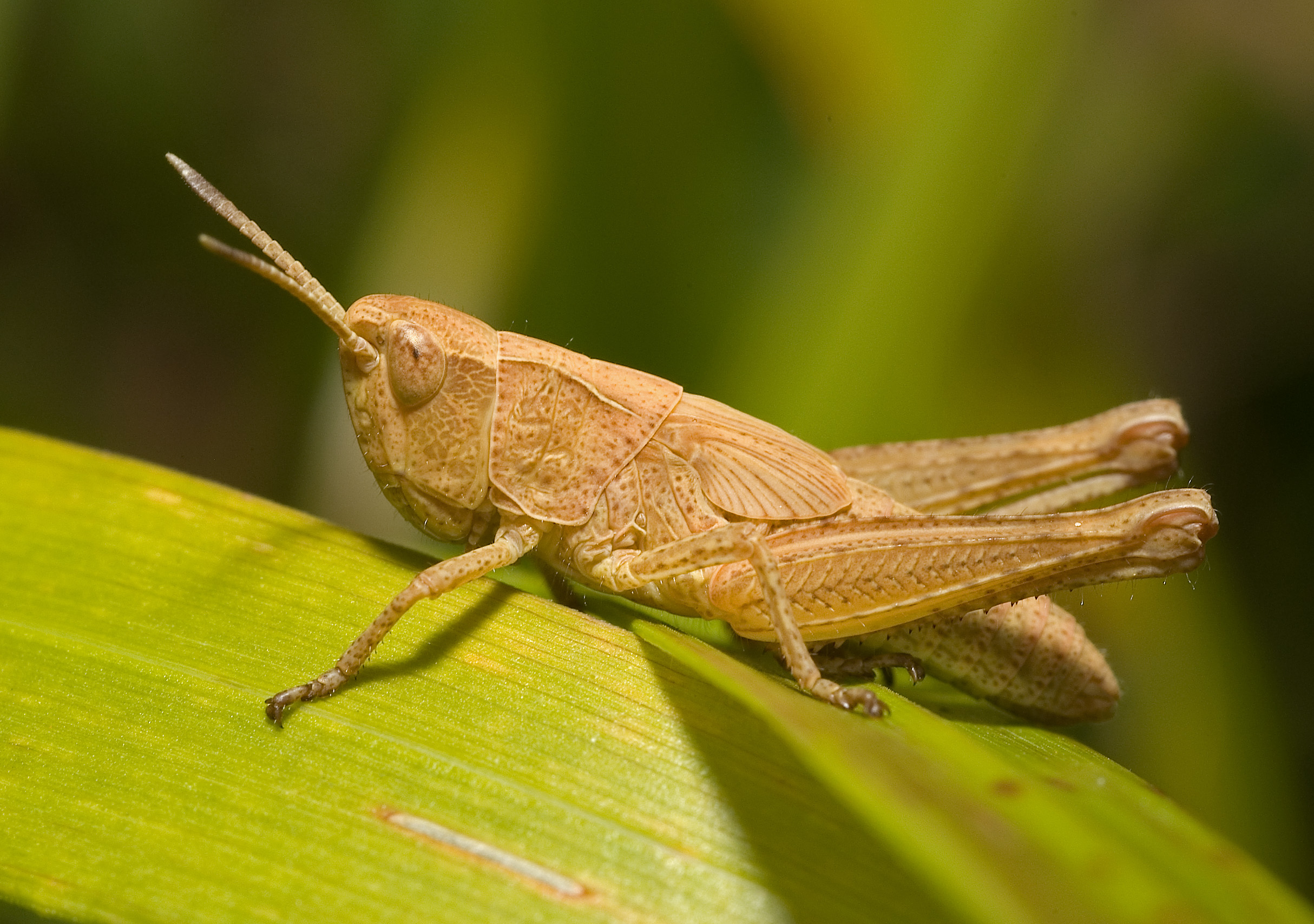
Nymph

Females lay eggs, usually five per egg packet, in semi-arid soil in the roots of grasses around autumn and winter. Nymphs hatch around late May, and adults appear beginning in late July. Development depends greatly on the temperature. Most are fully developed by the end of August. When autumn conditions are not too harsh, they are relatively tolerant of cold weather and adults may survive until early December. Despite this tolerance, they prefer warm weather and more individuals tend to survive through hotter summers than cooler summers...............

== Courtship and mating ==
=== The song ===
Sound of Gomphocerippus rufus
Field recording in the Netherlands 14s

The process of courtship consists of identical “courtship units”, each of which end in sound and are repeated without cessation. A sequence of such units is termed a “courtship song”. A song usually consists of three subunits. The male begins by orienting himself close to his target female, and continues with a set of rhythmic movements of various body parts, including swiveling of the head, trembling of the palps, and other movement of the antennae and hind legs. The entire process may last up to 15 continuous minutes. The first subunit is composed of head-rolling of various speeds, and the second and the third subunits contain different types of leg stridulation. If the female is willing to copulate, she will respond with sound and permit him to mate. Other than the sound produced at the end of each courtship unit, this grasshopper produces sound when no female is present, and when a female is moving away from him. The song produced when no female is present, the “ordinary song”, is similar to that of the sound within the courtship song. All sound is produced via movement of the legs. When in the active state, the female may even be induced to sing and permit copulation by even the male's ordinary song. Also, this grasshopper may make “pursuit sounds” if a female becomes near and then moves further away. Sound can be elicited via electrical stimulation. A study in which freely moving or partially restrained males were stimulated with sharpened wires and semi-microelectrodes caused the males to create the courtship song and the ordinary song, with most of the expected locomotion. This study found that the supraesophageal ganglion, or brain, controls songtype, and the sequence and coordination of courtship subunits. When induced by a stimulus, this stimulus overrode other behaviors, such as feeding or copulation.

Rufous grasshopper males perform an unusually long courtship. Their song has a reductive effect on locomotor activity within passive-state females. The exact mechanisms are not known, although scientists hypothesize that it somehow causes a hormonal change within the females. The result is advantageous, as this lack of movement ensures that the female will remain nearby. The resultant improved chances of copulation allow mating and fertilization to occur approximately one to two days earlier than it would without such an enduring display. Ultimately, the female will lay one or two more sets of eggs during that mating period, since it is the first egg deposition that determines when the following eggs are deposited. Additionally, the male can ensure that the female does not mate with another male during this period, since she is always nearby, although this is not always preventable. He also is capable of attracting active-state females with his long courtship song. This technique likely changed from the more typical search strategy, in which male grasshoppers travel while making songs and responding to females. Searching males are at a disadvantage since males who display long courtship guard the passive females they have sung to, and the females return to a defensive state, in which they do not permit mating, after copulation, so there are fewer available females. The existence of females whose locomotor activity was reduced by the songs precipitated the evolution of the long courtship technique.

=== The stages of female behavior: overview and pre-mating ===
Female behavior toward males is composed of three stages, beginning after the imaginal molt, through which the grasshopper reaches the adult phase. Which courtship stage a female is in is affected by age and whether she has mated in the past. First, there is rejection of the males, which lasts approximately four days. In this stage, the males can do nothing to induce copulation. Second, there is the two-day phase of passive acceptance without singing. Third, the female actively attracts the male by singing, and those in this state, which lasts several days, permit immediate copulation after a short courtship or without it. It is hypothesized that this active state exists as a method for individuals in populations of low densities to have a chance to copulate. It may be difficult in these populations to encounter other individuals by chance, and sounds produced by the males and females makes it easier for them to find one another. After successful copulation, she returns to a defensive state and lays eggs. After egg-laying, she once again reaches a state of passive acceptance. If she fails to mate during this stage, she will lay eggs fertilized by the previous male and return to active attraction. The cycle continues as it did at the first time entering the active phase, and follows this sequence for the rest of the adult life.

Pre-mating behaviors and the growth and development of the ovaries are controlled by the juvenile hormone-III, which is produced in the corpus allata. The production of this juvenile hormone fluctuates. Patterns of behavior are correlated with the increasing or decreasing rate of the concentration of this hormone. It is possible that the production by the corpus allata may be affected by nervous stimulation or inhibition of the glands. The hormone concentration within the hemolymph may be affected by esterases. Corpus allata activity is also affected by external factors, as it tends to be greater when mating and egg-laying are occurring, but much lower when they are prevented. When activity is lower, egg production is lower.

=== Secondary defense ===
Remating shortly after copulation is impossible for these grasshoppers. The act of copulation prompts a physiological and behavioral response in females termed “secondary defense”. During secondary defense, the female will respond to male attempts at copulation with strong, directed kicks of the hindlegs, which will deter the males and make forced mating impossible since the female may be almost twice as large as the male. This is advantageous for the male, as it protects his sperm from competition with other males before the pair's eggs are laid. This stage may last 3 to 4 days.

This defense is usually induced through contact of the proteins of the liquid white secretions of the white secretory tubule 1 of a male's accessory glands with the female's spermathecal duct (the process of which forms a spermatophore). More specifically, this is caused by a pheromone which is spurred by one of these proteins, of size less than 90 kDa. It can also be triggered by eggs exerting pressure against the walls of the oviduct on the pathway to oviposition. It is hypothesized that the secretion stimulates a bristle field of contact chemoreceptors where the spermathecal duct enters the endbulb. In other words, this defensive behavior is caused by both chemical and mechanical means. In terms of the four different stages of female behavior toward males, after copulation the female returns to a defensive state in which she rejects all male advances.

There are additional reasons for the inability to remate. The spermatophore actually blocks the spermathecal duct so that another spermatophore cannot physiologically be planted. Additionally, after mating is completed, the genitalia of the pair hook firmly together for 40 to 90 minutes due to the clasping reflex, which prevents other males from mating with the female before she reaches the defensive state.

Other than the loss of sexual receptivity after a copulation, refusal to mate occurs during the juvenile stage, when the insect is not yet fully sexually mature. Female grasshoppers who have not yet copulated with a male and are in the defensive state are exhibiting “primary defense”. During this phase, the females also respond to males with strong kicks of the hindlegs, but more heavily rely on escaping and evading the male.

=== Post-copulation ===
After finishing the defensive state (which usually occurs after laying eggs if having previously copulated), the female enters the state of passive acceptance. This willingness appears to be due to ablation of a bristle field of contact receptors in the duck or denervation, or loss of nerve supply, to the spermatheca, or alternatively it is due to the severance of the ventral nerve cord.

Sperm not used in fertilization of the eggs can be maintained in the spermathecal bulb, which connects to the duct. This creates sperm competition between the sperm of previous mates and more recent ones. Newly obtained sperm enters the bulb, pushing older sperm to the back, and remains near the exit. So newer sperm is used before the older sperm. So, the outcome of this sperm competition is essentially determined by the shape of the bulb.
