= Aztecacris gloriosa =

Scientific classification
- Kingdom: Animalia
- Phylum: Arthropoda
- Class: Insecta
- Order: Orthoptera
- Suborder: Caelifera
- Family: Acrididae
- Genus: Aztecacris
- Species: A. gloriosa

Binomial name
- Aztecacris gloriosa (Hebard, 1935)

Synonyms
- Perixerus gloriosus Hebard, 1935

Species of grasshopper

Aztecacris gloriosa, the Atascosa gem grasshopper, is a species of spur-throated grasshopper in the family Acrididae. It is found in the southwestern United States (Arizona) and Mexico. Its vernacular name refers to its type locality near Atascosa Peak in Arizona.

Aztecacris gloriosa measure about 16–25 mm (0.63–0.98 in) in length.
