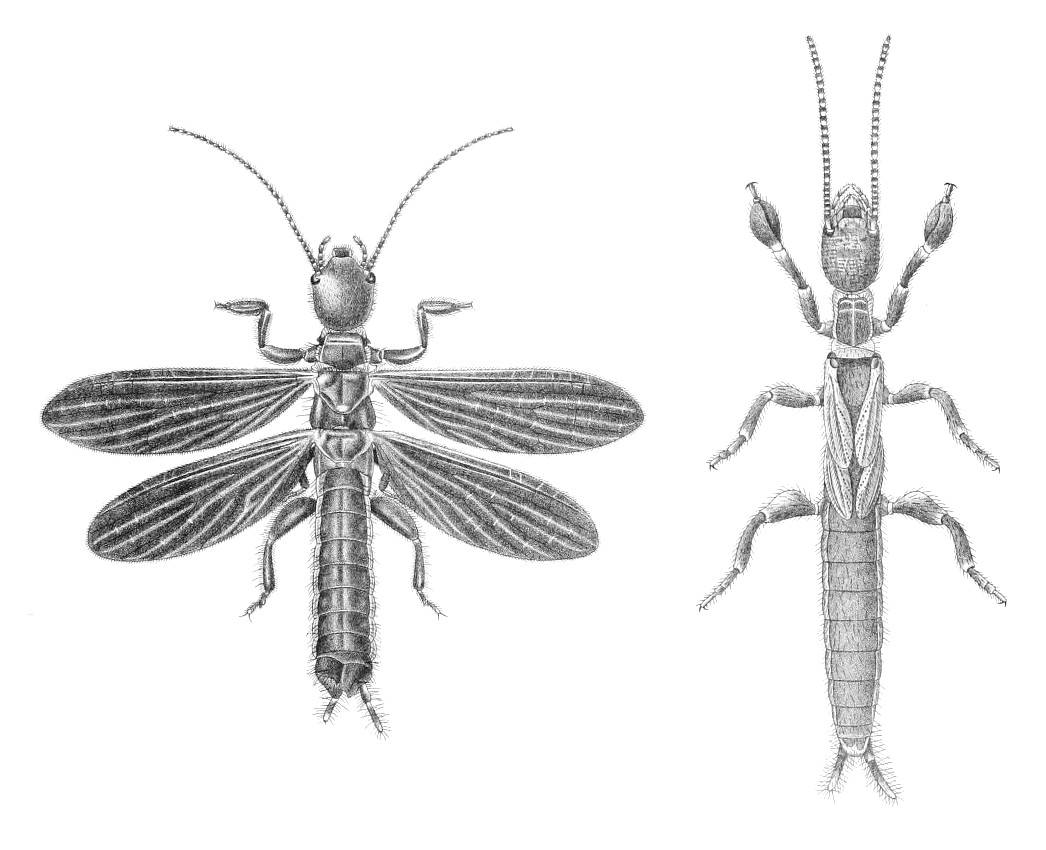
- Embia major - male and male nymph

Scientific classification
- Kingdom: Animalia
- Phylum: Arthropoda
- Class: Insecta
- Order: Embioptera
- Suborder: Euembiodea
- Family: Embiidae; Burmeister, 1839

= Embiidae =

Family of insects

Embiidae is a family of webspinners in the order Embioptera. There are more than 20 genera and 80 described species in Embiidae.

== Genera ==
These 23 genera belong to the family Embiidae:

- Acrosembia Ross, 2006
- Apterembia Ross, 1957
- Arabembia Ross, 1981
- Berlandembia Davis, 1940
- Chirembia Davis, 1940
- Cleomia Stefani, 1953
- Dihybocercus Enderlein, 1912
- Dinembia Davis, 1939
- Donaconethis Enderlein, 1909
- Embia Latreille, 1829
- Enveja Navás, 1916
- Leptembia Krauss, 1911
- Machadoembia Ross, 1952
- Macrembia Davis, 1940
- Metembia Davis, 1939
- Odontembia Davis, 1939
- Oedembia Ross, 2007
- Parachirembia Davis, 1940
- Parembia Davis, 1939
- Parthenembia Ross, 1960
- Pseudembia Davis, 1939
- † Electroembia Ross, 1956
- † Galloembdia Falières, Engel, & Nel, 2021
- † Lithembia Ross, 1984
