= Sarcohyla robertsorum =

Conservation status
- Vulnerable (IUCN 3.1)

Scientific classification
- Kingdom: Animalia
- Phylum: Chordata
- Class: Amphibia
- Order: Anura
- Family: Hylidae
- Genus: Sarcohyla
- Species: S. robertsorum

Binomial name
- Sarcohyla robertsorum (Taylor, 1940)

Synonyms
- Hyla robertsorum Taylor, 1940; Plectrohyla robertsorum (Taylor, 1940)

Species of frog

Sarcohyla robertsorum is a species of frog in the family Hylidae. It is endemic to Mexico. Its natural habitats are subtropical or tropical moist montane forests and rivers. It has been observed between 2250 and 3050 meters above sea level. It is threatened by habitat loss.

The frog is named after H. Radclyffe Roberts and his wife Hazel Roberts, who collected the holotype.
