= Sinembiidae =

Sinembiidae Temporal range: Callovian–Oxfordian

Scientific classification
- Domain: Eukaryota
- Kingdom: Animalia
- Phylum: Arthropoda
- Class: Insecta
- Order: Embioptera
- Suborder: Euembiodea
- Family: †Sinembiidae; Huang & Nel, 2009

Extinct family of insects

Sinembiidae is an extinct family of webspinners in the order Embioptera. There are at least two genera and two described species in Sinembiidae.

== Genera ==
These two genera belong to the family Sinembiidae:

- † Juraembia Huang & Nel, 2009
- † Sinembia Huang & Nel, 2009

Both were discovered in the Middle Jurassic of Inner Mongolia, and described in 2009. The female of Juraembia ningchengensis had wings, supporting Ross's proposal that both sexes of ancestral Embioptera were winged.
