= Robert Matheson (entomologist) =

American entomologist

Robert Matheson (1881, West River, Nova Scotia – 1958, Princeton, New Jersey) was an American entomologist who specialised in Coleoptera.

He was Professor of Entomology, New York State College of Agriculture, Cornell University.

== Works ==
Partial list

- Entomology for introductory courses Comstock Publishing Co. (1944)
- Medical Entomology Comstock Publishing Co. (1932)
