= Teratembiidae =

Scientific classification
- Domain: Eukaryota
- Kingdom: Animalia
- Phylum: Arthropoda
- Class: Insecta
- Order: Embioptera
- Family: Teratembiidae; Krauss, 1911

Genera
- See text

Family of insects

Teratembiidae is a family of insects in the order Embioptera, the web-spinners. They are distributed in the Nearctic, Neotropical and Afrotropical realms.

Genera include:

- Dachtylembia
- Diradius
- Oligembia
- Paroligembia
- Teratembia
