= H. Radclyffe Roberts =

American entomologist (1906–1982)

- Portrait of Roberts accompanying Ruth Patrick's obituary of him
- Born: March 26, 1906; Villanova, Pennsylvania, US
- Died: June 11, 1982 (aged 76); Bryn Mawr, Pennsylvania, US
- Known for: Mosquito Atlas (with E.S. Ross)
- Spouse: Enid Hazel Warden Roberts (m. 1933–1982)
- Children: 3

Academic background
- Education: Princeton University (B.S., 1929); University of Pennsylvania (Ph.D., 1941)
- Thesis: A Comparative Study of the Subfamilies of the Acrididae (Orthoptera) Primarily on the Basis of Their Phallic Structures (1941)

Academic work
- Discipline: Entomology
- Sub-discipline: Acridology
- Institutions: Academy of Natural Sciences of Philadelphia

Howard Radclyffe Roberts Jr. (March 26, 1906 – June 11, 1982) was an American entomologist known for his work on grasshoppers. His 1941 University of Pennsylvania Ph.D. dissertation was an early work highlighting the role phallic structures could play in grasshopper taxonomy. While serving in World War II, he and Edward Shearman Ross cowrote The Mosquito Atlas, used by the armed forces to identify malaria-transmitting mosquitos. Roberts worked for the Academy of Natural Sciences of Philadelphia (ANSP), serving as its managing director from 1947 to 1972. He described dozens of grasshopper species from North and South America, and also is the eponym of several taxa named in his honor.

== Early life and education ==
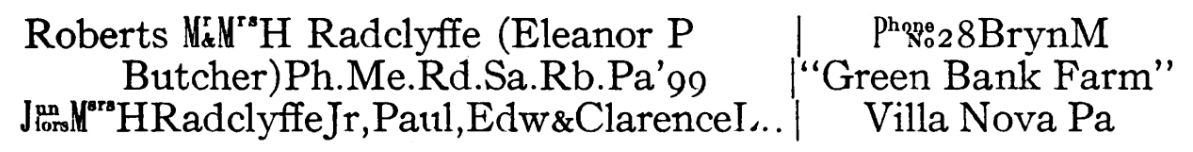
The Robertses in the 1923 Philadelphia Social Register

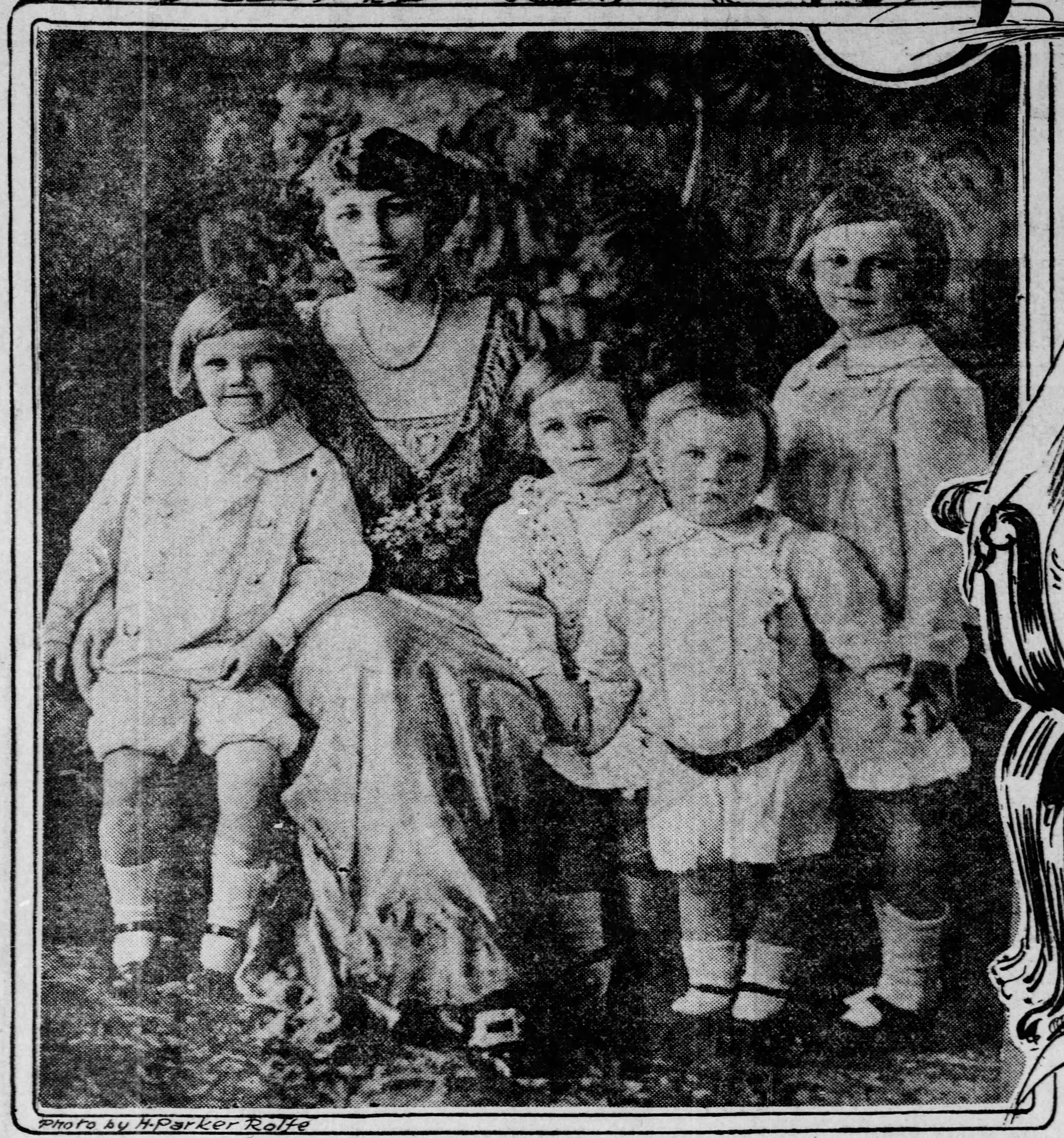
Family portrait (1913) showing Radclyffe, his mother Eleanor, and his brothers Paul, Edward, and Clarence

Roberts was born on March 26, 1906, in Villanova, Pennsylvania, into an upper-class Philadelphia family. His parents were Howard Radclyffe Roberts (son of the sculptor Howard Roberts) and Eleanor Page Roberts (née Butcher); he was one of four sons. He attended Haverford School, and graduated from St. Paul's School in Concord, New Hampshire in 1925. Francis Beach White, who was the head of St. Paul's English department, encouraged Roberts' interest in natural history; White had ornithology as a hobby.

Roberts graduated from Princeton University in 1929 with a Bachelor of Science in architecture. He was a member of the Ivy Club, one of Princeton's eating clubs. As an undergraduate, Roberts began participating in expeditions for the Academy of Natural Sciences of Philadelphia. In 1928, he went to North Carolina with M. B. Cadwalader to collect water fowl and shore birds. Roberts went on several bird-collecting expeditions for the academy in the late 1920s and early 1930s, going to Trinidad and Sudan, among other places. Some of these early expeditions were with the ornithologist Melbourne Armstrong Carriker to Peru.

== Research ==
He got his doctorate from the University of Pennsylvania in 1941, where he studied under Clarence Erwin McClung; Morgan Hebard at the ANSP also encouraged his study of grasshoppers. His dissertation, A Comparative Study of the Subfamilies of the Acrididae (Orthoptera) Primarily on the Basis of Their Phallic Structures, was published in Proceedings of the Academy of Natural Sciences of Philadelphia. This work was among the first to make use of the male phallic complex in grasshopper taxonomy beyond species-level analysis; this analysis divided grasshoppers into two groups based on the morphology of the ejaculatory sac. It remains one of the most important works on the skeletal system and sclerites of grasshopper phalluses.

Roberts volunteered with the U.S. Army during World War II, joining the Medical Entomological Department. He became a Major serving with the Malaria Survey Unit in the Philippines and New Guinea. In 1943, Edward S. Ross and Roberts published The Mosquito Atlas in two volumes. The American Entomological Society published the volumes, which the U.S. War Department distributed in loose leaf. Roberts and Ross began working on this publication at the headquarters of the 8th Service Command in Texas and finished writing it at the U.S. National Museum. The entomologist Robert Matheson wrote in a review for The Quarterly Review of Biology that it "should be a great help in the identification of the species" and praised the illustrations. It was important to those fighting malaria during World War II and helped saved thousands of lives.

In 1966 and 1967 Roberts went to Costa Rica to collect arboreal grasshoppers. In order to get the grasshoppers down from the trees he invented a machine to shoot insecticide into the canopy and then dead insects would fall to plastic tarps on the ground. A parachute was launched into the treetops, and then an "insect bomb" was hoisted up to the parachute using pulleys. He tested this procedure on trees near his home in Bryn Mawr, Pennsylvania, before his trip. The Philadelphia Inquirer discussed this as "one of his more colorful experiments" in its obituary for him. Roberts made field expeditions to Argentina, Bolivia, Brazil, and Venezuela in 1976 and 1981. He deposited many specimens he collected in these trips in South American museums including La Plata Museum and the National Museum of Brazil. A 1978 catalogue of the ANSP included 35 holotypes for taxa which Roberts had described. Roberts' papers on Orthoptera were published over the span of 1937 to 1992; fifty-four of the grasshopper species he described remained valid names as of 2009.

Learned societies Roberts belonged to included: the Entomological Society of America, the American Ornithologists' Union, the American Society of Mammalogists, the American Association for the Advancement of Science, the American Society of Zoologists, and the American Entomological Society. The Pan American Acridological Society gave Roberts an honorary membership in 1981. He was also in Sigma Xi.

== Administratorship ==
Roberts became the managing director of the ANSP in 1947. He tended to stay out of the public spotlight, being more personally involved in research than public events and fundraising, in contrast to his predecessor, Charles Cadwalader. Over the course of Roberts' directorship, the research staff grew from a dozen to over one hundred. As part of his efforts to professionalize the research staff, Roberts recruited scientists from outside Philadelphia for paid positions which previously were often held by self-financed volunteers. While he was managing director, the ANSP established its Women's Committee. His directorship also saw the establishment of a new Department of Limnology in May 1948. As director Roberts took a personal interest in the Fish Department with Charles C. G. Chaplin and James Erwin Böhlke; he accompanied them on several trips to the Caribbean for Fishes of the Bahamas and Adjacent Tropical Waters. Roberts also initiated the monograph series Notulae Naturae for short scientific articles. Roberts retired from the role of managing director in 1972 with the title Curator Emeritus of the Department of Entomology.

== Personal life ==
Roberts married Enid Hazel Warden (1912–2006) on August 23, 1933. She was originally from Devonshire, England; they married in London. His wife sometimes accompanied him on field expeditions; while in Mexico, she collected the type specimen of Coelostemma hazelae, which the American malacologist Henry Augustus Pilsbry named after her. They had three children: Pauline Stella Roberts, Radclyffe Burnand Roberts, and Eleanor Page Roberts. His son was also an entomologist; his research focused on bees.

Roberts was also on the board of the Children's Seashore House from 1943 to 1982 and also served as its president for ten years. He was also a board member for the Fairmount Park Art Association. He became the chairman of the publication committee for Sculpture of A City: Philadelphia's Treasures in Bronze and Gold after the initial chairman had to fulfill duties for Expo '74. Roberts was also on the advisory board for Swiss Pines gardens. For leisure he grew orchids, and competed in orchid shows.

== Death and legacy ==
Roberts died on June 11, 1982, at Bryn Mawr Hospital. He had been planning an expedition to do additional fieldwork in Brazil before he fell ill. Ruth Patrick wrote his obituary for Proceedings of the Academy of Natural Sciences of Philadelphia, and Daniel Otte wrote his obituary for Metaleptea. Revista de la Sociedad Entomológica Argentina also published an obituary of Roberts, as did The Philadelphia Inquirer and Princeton Alumni Weekly. The Social Register also noted his death.

Taxa named in honor of Roberts (cited in their original combinations) include:

- Thaumastus robertsi Pilsbry, 1932
- Psilopsiagon aurifrons robertsi (Note: Roberts' parakeet) Carriker, 1933
- Oedipus robertsi (Note: Roberts' false brook salamander) Taylor, 1939
- Cadomastax robertsi Rehn & Rehn, 1939
- Hyla robertsorum (Note: Roberts' treefrog, named after him and his wife) Taylor, 1940
- Pterophylla robertsi Hebard, 1941
- Aplatacris robertsi Rehn, 1944
- Aedes robertsi Laffoon, 1946
- Phrynotettix robertsi Rehn & Grant, 1959
- Piscaris robertsi Kevan, Singh, & Akbar, 1964
- Steirodon robertsorum (Note: Named after him and his son R. B. Roberts) Emsley, 1970
- Eumastax robertsi Descamps, 1973
- Peltolobus robertsi Peña, 1974
- Balachowskyacris robertsi Descamps, 1976
- Parascopas robertsi Ronderos, 1976
- Caenolampis robertsi Descamps, 1978
- Radacris (Note: Roberts was known as "Rad" to his friends) Ronderos & Sanchez, 1983
- Radacridium Carbonell, 1984
- Platydecticus robertsi Rentz & Gurney, 1985
- Parasymploce robertsi Roth, 1985
- Dinagapostemon goneus (Note: Named by his son; γονεύς means "progenitor") Roberts & Brooks, 1987
- Phlugis robertsi Nickle, 2005
- Parapiezops robertsi Cadena-Castañeda & Cardona, 2015
