= Edward Shearman Ross =

American entomologist and photographer (1915–2016)

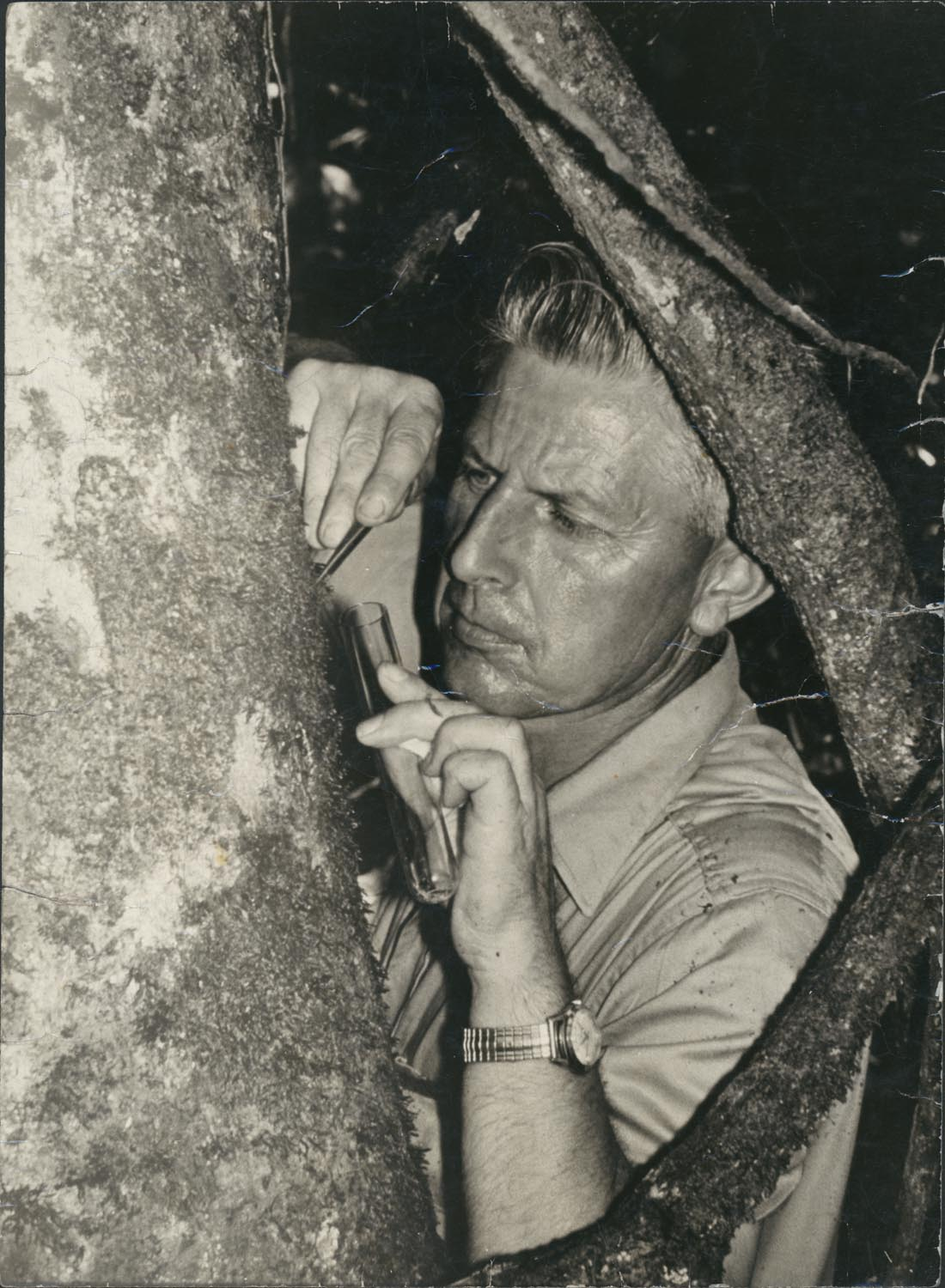
- Born: September 1, 1915; Spokane, Washington, U.S.
- Died: March 16, 2016 (aged 100); Mill Valley, California, U.S.
- Education: University of California, Berkeley
- Spouse: Wilda Ross (m. 1942)
- Children: 2
- Scientific career
- Fields: Entomologist

Edward Shearman Ross (September 1, 1915 – March 16, 2016) was an American entomologist. He majored in entomology at the University of California, Berkeley. Before his PhD was conferred, he worked as curator of insects at the California Academy of Sciences. He wrote many scientific and popular articles about the biology of the insects, most notably on webspinners (Embioptera).

Ross served in the United States Army and was stationed in the Philippines and New Guinea.

Ross was a fellow of the Entomological Society of America since 1947. He was a Guggenheim Fellow for the academic year 1954–1955.

Ross died on March 16, 2016, at his home in Mill Valley at the age of 100.

== Family ==
Ross married his wife Wilda, a botanist, in 1942, and had two children with her, Martha and Clark. He had three grandchildren.

== Selected publications ==
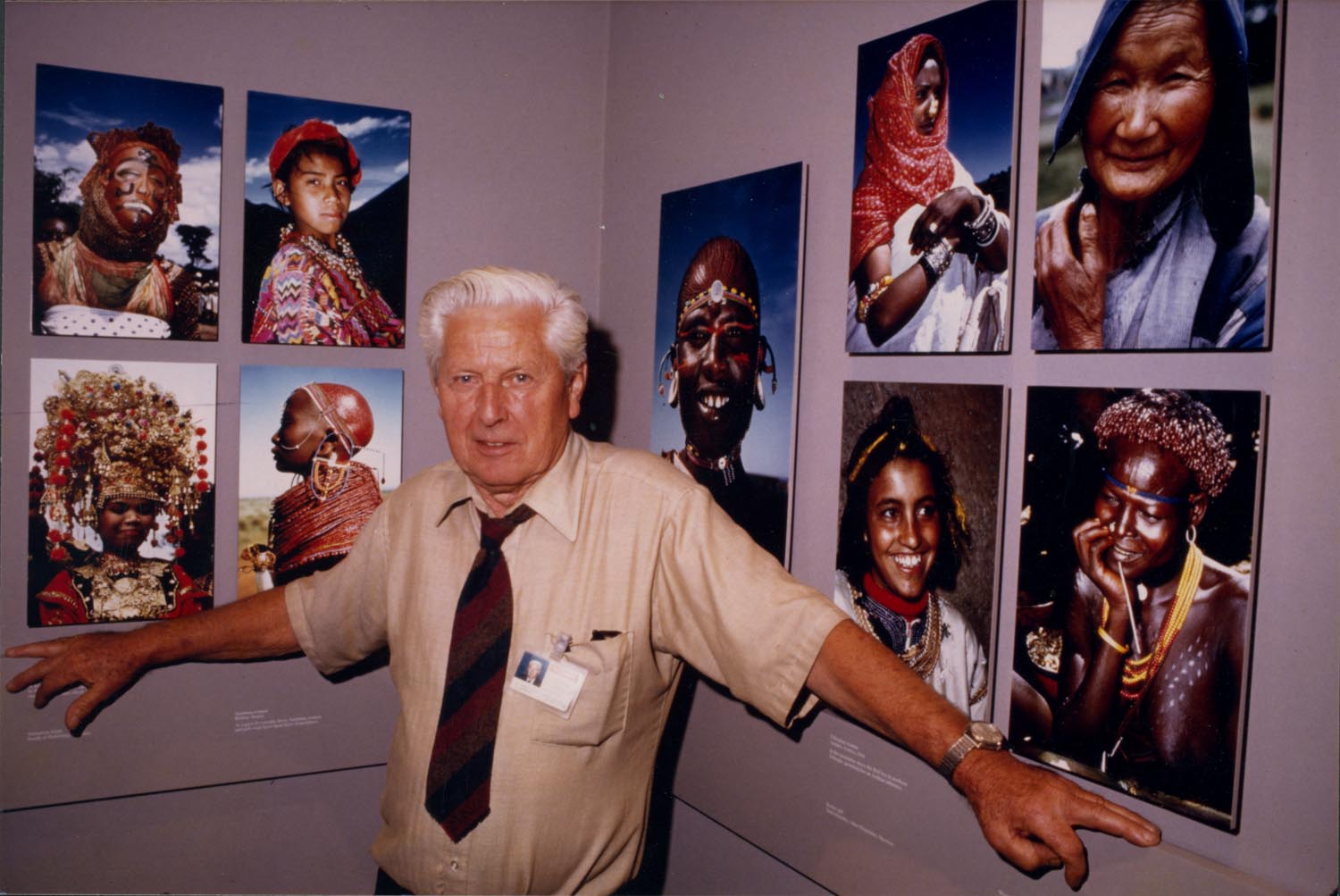
Edward Shearman Ross during an exhibit on his lifelong work achievements

- Ross, Edward Shearman; Roberts, H. Radclyffe (1943). Mosquito Atlas. Part I. The Nearctic Anopheles, important Malaria Vectors of the Americas and Aëdes aegypti, Culex quinquefasciatus. American Entomological Society.
- ———; Roberts, H. R (1943). Mosquito Atlas. Part II. Eighteen Old World Anophelines important to Malaria. American Entomological Society.
- —— (1943). "Two new Indian Embioptera and the lectotype of Oligotoma borneensis Hagen" (PDF). Psyche: A Journal of Entomology. 50 (3–4): 100–108. doi:10.1155/1943/27010.
- ——— (1944). "A revision of the Embioptera, or web-spinners, of the New World" (PDF). Proceedings of the United States National Museum. 94 (3175): 401–504. doi:10.5479/si.00963801.94-3175.401; followed by plates 18 & 19
- ——— (1955). Insects Close up. A Pictorial Guide for the Photographer and Collector. University of California Press.
  - ——— (2021). Insects Close Up. Hassell Street Press. ISBN 978-1015203181; pbk reprint; 92 pages
- ——— (1961). The Ants. Columbia Record Club; 45 pages
- ——— (1968). Camouflage in Nature. Children's Press; 63 pages
- ——— (1970). "Biosystematics of the Embioptera". Annual Review of Entomology. 15: 157–172. doi:10.1146/annurev.en.15.010170.001105.
- ——— (2006). "Paedembiidae, a remarkable new family and infraorder of Embiidina from Afghanistan" (PDF). Proceedings of the California Academy of Sciences. 57 (27): 785–794.
