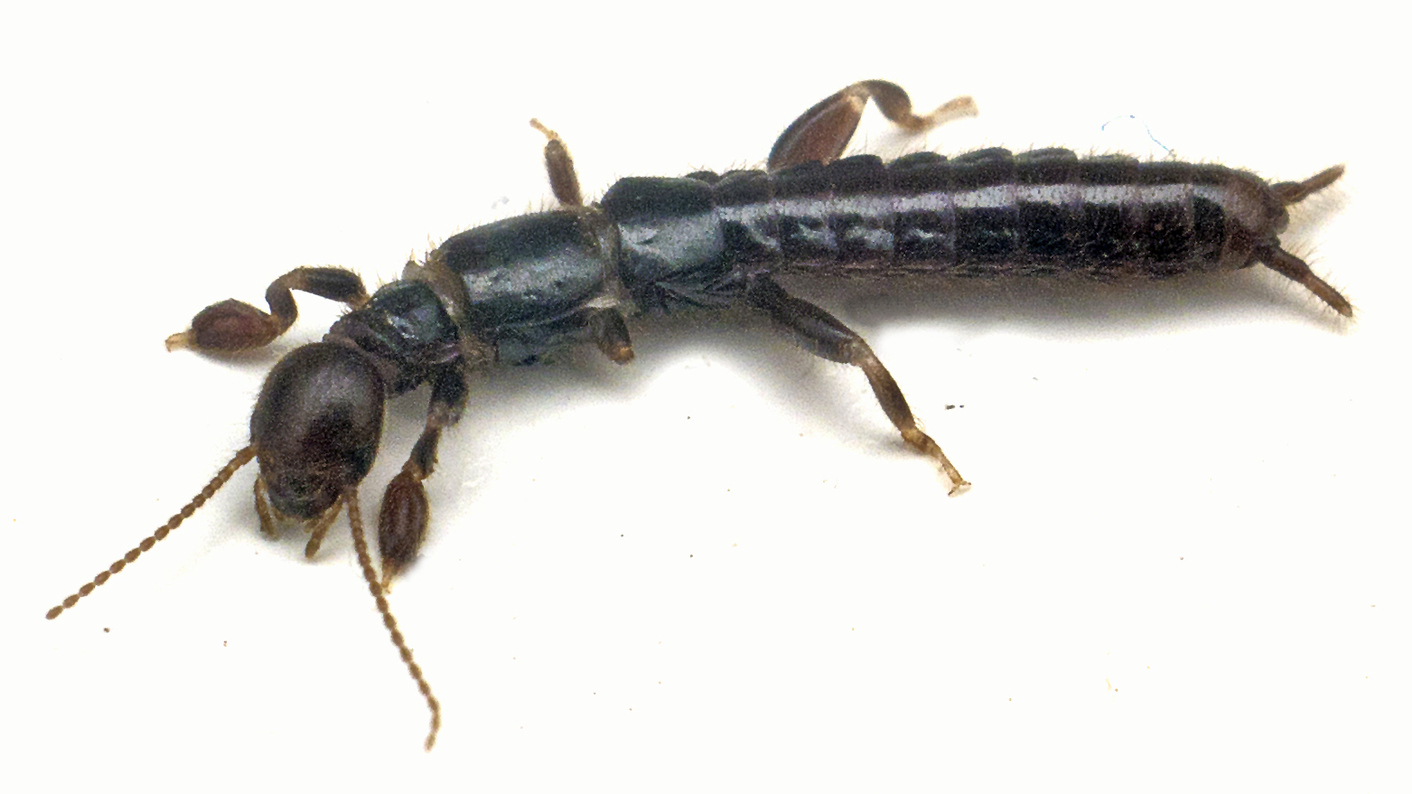
- Notoligotoma nitens

Scientific classification
- Kingdom: Animalia
- Phylum: Arthropoda
- Clade: Pancrustacea
- Class: Insecta
- Cohort: Polyneoptera
- Order: Embioptera; Lameere, 1900

Families
- Andesembiidae Ross, 2003; Anisembiidae Davis, 1940; Archembiidae Ross, 2001; Australembiidae Ross, 1963; Clothodidae Enderlein, 1909; Embiidae Burmeister, 1839; Notoligotomidae Davis, 1940; Oligotomidae Enderlein, 1909; Ptilocerembiidae Miller & Edgerly, 2012; Scelembiidae Ross, 2001; Teratembiidae Krauss, 1911

Synonyms
- Embides; Embidina; Embiida; Embiidina; Embiodea

= Embioptera =

Embioptera Temporal range: 199–0 Ma Jurassic – Recent

Order of insects

The order Embioptera, commonly known as webspinners or footspinners, are a small group of mostly tropical and subtropical insects, classified under the subclass Pterygota. The order has also been called Embiodea or Embiidina. More than 400 species in 11 families have been described, the oldest known fossils of the group being from the mid-Jurassic. Species are very similar in appearance, having long, flexible bodies, short legs, and only males having wings.

Webspinners are gregarious, living subsocially in galleries of fine silk which they spin from glands on their forelegs. Members of these colonies are often related females and their offspring; adult males do not feed and die soon after mating. Males of some species have wings and are able to disperse, whereas the females remain near where they were hatched. Newly mated females may vacate the colony and establish a new one nearby. Others may emerge to search for a new food source to which the galleries can be extended, but in general, the insects rarely venture from their galleries.

== Name and entomology ==
The name Embioptera ("lively wings") comes from Greek εμβιος (embios), meaning "lively", and πτερον (pteron), meaning "wing", a name that has not been considered to be particularly descriptive for this group of fliers, perhaps instead referring to their remarkable speed of movement both forward and backward. The common name webspinner comes from the insects' unique tarsi on their front legs, which produce multiple strands of silk. They use the silk to make web-like galleries in which they live.

Early entomologists considered the webspinners to be a group within the termites or the neuropterans and a variety of group names have been suggested including Adenopoda, Embidaria, Embiaria, and Aetioptera. In 1909 Günther Enderlein used the name Embiidina which was used widely for a while. Edward S. Ross suggested a new name, Embiomorpha in 2007. The currently most-widely accepted ordinal name is Embioptera, suggested by Arthur Shipley in 1904.

== Evolution ==
=== Fossil history ===
Fossils of webspinners are rare. The group probably first appeared during the Jurassic; the oldest known, Sinembia rossi and Juraembia ningchengensis, both in a new family Sinembiidae created for them, are from the Middle Jurassic of Inner Mongolia, and were described in 2009. The female of J. ningchengensis had wings, supporting Ross's proposal that both sexes of ancestral Embioptera were winged. Species such as Atmetoclothoda orthotenes, possibly the first fossil member of the Clothodidae to be discovered, sometimes thought to be a "primitive" family, have been found in mid-Cretaceous amber from northern Myanmar. Litoclostes delicatus (Oligotomidae) has been found in the same locality. The largest number of fossils have been found in mid-Eocene Baltic amber and early-Miocene Dominican amber. Flattened compression fossils that have been interpreted as being webspinners have been found from the Eocene/Oligocene shales of Florissant, Colorado.

=== Phylogeny ===
Over 400 embiopteran species in 11 families have been described worldwide, the largest proportion of which inhabit tropical regions. It is estimated that there may be around 2000 species extant today.

The external phylogeny of Embioptera has been debated, with the polyneopteran order controversially classed in 2007 as a sister group to both Zoraptera (angel insects) and Phasmatodea (stick insects). The position of the Embioptera within the Polyneoptera suggested by a phylogenetic analysis carried out in 2012 by Miller et al., combining morphological and molecular evidence, is shown in the cladogram.

- Part of Polyneoptera
  - Plecoptera (stoneflies)
  - - Orthoptera (grasshoppers, crickets)
    - - Dictyoptera (cockroaches, termites, mantises)
      - - Phasmatodea (stick insects)
        - Embioptera (webspinners)

The internal phylogeny of the group is not yet fully resolved. Miller et al.'s phylogenetic analysis examined 96 morphological characters and 5 genes for 82 species across the order. Four families were found to be robustly monophyletic in whatever way the phylogeny was analysed (parsimony, maximum likelihood, or Bayesian): Clothodidae, Anisembiidae, Oligotomidae, and Teratembiidae. The Embiidae, Scelembiidae, and Australembiidae remain monophyletic in one or more of the three analyses, but are broken up in others, so their status remains uncertain. Either the Clothodidae (under parsimony analysis) or Australembiidae (under Bayesian analysis) is the sister taxon to the remaining Embioptera taxa, so no single phylogenetic tree can be taken as definitive from this work.

== Description ==
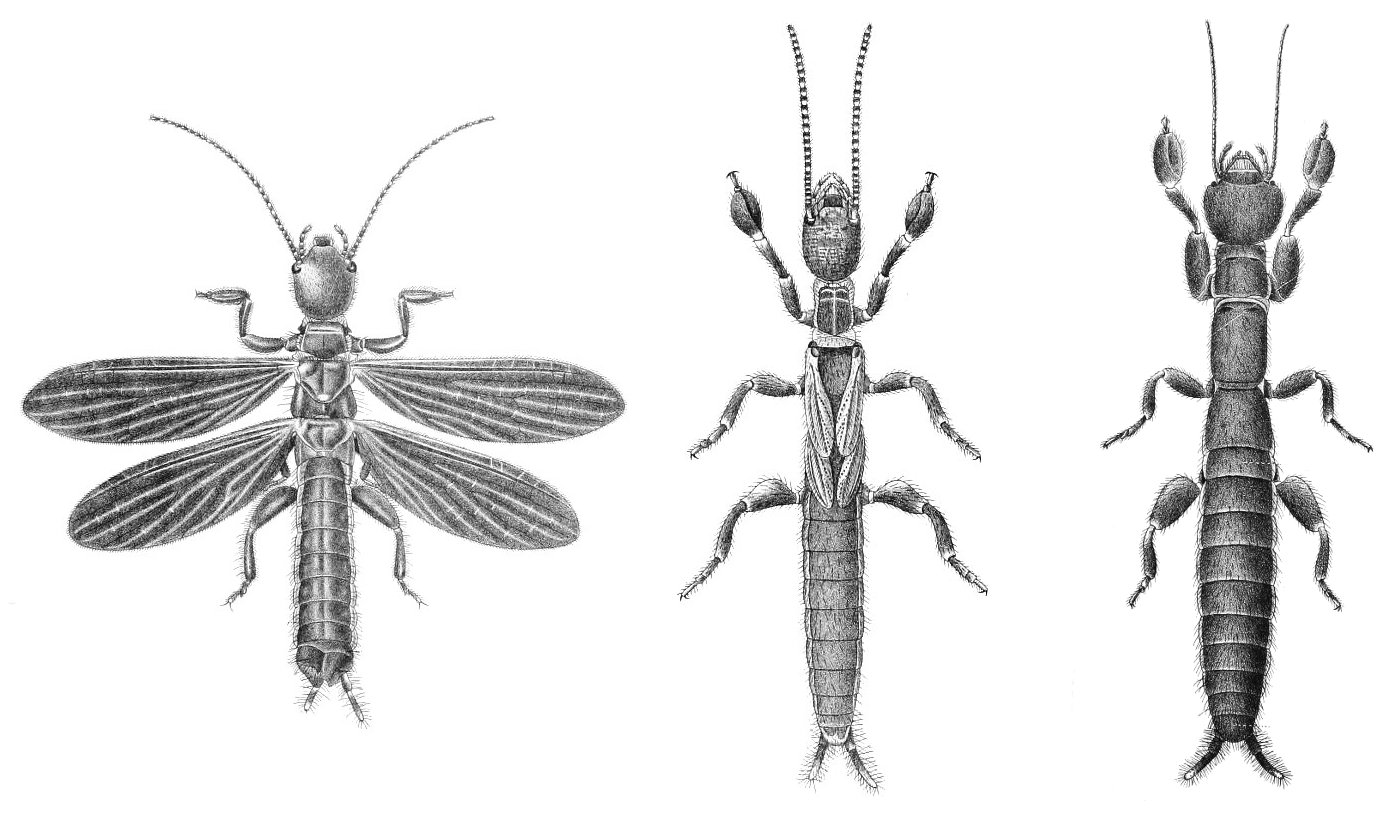
Drawings of Embia major winged male, male nymph and adult female "from the Himalayas" by Augustus Daniel Imms, 1913

All webspinners have a remarkably similar body form, although they do vary in coloration and size. The majority are brown or black, ranging to pink or reddish shades in some species, and range in length from 15 to 20 mm (0.6 to 0.8 in). The body form of these insects is completely specialised for the silk tunnels and chambers in which they reside, being cylindrical, long, narrow and highly flexible. The head has projecting mouthparts with chewing mandibles. The compound eyes are kidney-shaped, there are no ocelli, and the thread-like antennae are long, with up to 32 segments. The antennae are flexible, so they do not become entangled in the silk, and the wings have a crosswise crease, allowing them to fold forwards and enable the male to dart backwards without the wings snagging the fabric.

The first segment of the thorax is small and narrow, while the second and third are larger and broader, especially in the males, where they include the flight muscles. All the females and nymphs are wingless, whereas adult males can be either winged or wingless depending on species. The wings, where present, occur as two pairs that are similar in size and shape: long and narrow, with relatively simple venation. These wings operate using basic hydraulics; pre-flight, chambers (sinus veins) within the wings inflate with hemolymph (blood), making them rigid enough for use. On landing, these chambers deflate and the wings become flexible, folding back against the body. Wings can also fold forwards over the body, and this, along with the flexibility allows easy movement through the narrow silk galleries, either forwards or backwards, without resulting in damage.

The male's wings are stiffened and inflated as hemolymph fills sinus veins for flight; a crosswise crease allows them to fold in half to prevent damage when the insect runs backwards in a gallery.

In both males and females the legs are short and sturdy, with an enlarged basal tarsomere on the front pair, containing the silk-producing glands; the mid and hind legs also have three tarsal segments with the hind femur enlarged to house the strong tibial depressor muscles that enable rapid reverse movement. It is these silk glands on the front tarsi that distinguish the embiopterans; other noteworthy characteristics of this group include three-jointed tarsi, simple wing venation with few cross veins, prognathous (head with forward-facing mouthparts), and absence of ocelli (simple eyes).

The abdomen has ten segments, with a pair of cerci on the final segment. These cerci, made up of two segments and asymmetric in length especially in the males are highly sensitive to touch, and allow the animal to navigate while moving backwards through the gallery tunnels, which are too narrow to allow the insect to turn round. Because morphology is so similar between taxa, species identification is extremely difficult. For this reason, the main form of taxonomic identification used in the past has been close observation of distinctive copulatory structures of males, (although this method is now thought by some entomologists and taxonomists as giving insufficient classification detail). Although males never eat during their adult stage, they do have mouthparts similar to those of the females. These mouthparts are used to hold onto the female during copulation.

== Life cycle ==
The eggs hatch into nymphs that resemble small, wingless adults. After a short period of parental care, the nymphs undergo hemimetabolosis (incomplete metamorphosis), moulting a total of four times before reaching adult form. Adult males never eat, and leave the home colony almost immediately to find a female and mate. Those males that cannot fly often mate with females in nearby colonies, meaning their chosen mates are often siblings or close relatives. In some species, the female eats the male after mating, but in any event, the male does not survive for long. A few species are parthenogenetic, meaning they can produce viable offspring without fertilisation of the eggs. This phenomenon occurs when a female is, for whatever reason, unable to find a male to mate with, thus giving her and her species reproductive security at all times. After moulting and mating, the female lays a single batch of eggs either within the existing gallery, or wanders away to start a new colony elsewhere. Because the females are flightless, their potential for dispersal is limited to the distance a female can walk.

== Behaviour and ecology ==
=== Behaviour ===
Most, if not all, embiopteran species are gregarious but subsocial. Typically, adult females show maternal care of their eggs and young, and often live in large colonies with other adult females, creating and sharing the webbing cover that helps to protect them against predators. The advantages of living in these colonies outweigh the disadvantage that results from the increased parasite load that this lifestyle entails. Although some species breed once a year, or even once in two years, others breed more frequently, with Aposthonia ceylonica producing four or five batches of eggs in a twelve-month period.

Maternal care starts with the placement of the eggs. Some species attach batches of eggs to the web structure with silk; others form the eggs into rows in grooves excavated in the bark; others fix them in rows with a cement formed from saliva, while many species bury them in a mass of silk, even incorporating other materials into the covering. The majority of embiopterans guard their eggs, some actually standing over them, the main exception being species such as Saussurembia calypso that scatter their eggs widely. The main threat to the eggs is from egg parasitoids, which can attack whole batches of undefended eggs. At this time the adult females become very territorial and aggressive to other individuals with whom they previously lived in harmony; three different types of vibratory signals are used to deter other embiopterans that approach the eggs too closely, and the intruder usually retires.

After the eggs have hatched, the mothers resume their gregarious behaviour. In some species, they continue caring for their young for several days after hatching, and in a few, this parental care even involves the female feeding the nymphs with portions of chewed-up leaf litter and other foods. The parthenogenetic Rhagadochir virgo incorporates scraps of lichen into the silk wrapping the eggs, and this may be eaten by newly hatched nymphs. Perhaps because individuals of this species are so closely related, the adults spin silk together and move around in coordinated groups. Even in species that provide no further parental care, the nymphs in the colony benefit from the greater silk-producing power of the adults and the extra protection that the more copious silk covering brings.

Subsociality is a trade-off for the female, as the energy and time that is exerted in caring for her young is rewarded by giving them a much greater chance of surviving and carrying on her genetic lineage. Some species do share galleries with more than one adult, however, most groups consist of one adult female and her offspring.

When webspinners clean their antennae, they may differ in their behavior from other insects which typically make use of the forelegs to either clean or bring the antennae toward the mouthparts for manipulation. Webspinners (as observed in the genus Oligembia) instead fold the antennae under the body and clean the antennae as they are held between the mouthparts and the substrate.

When constructing their silken galleries, webspinners use characteristic cyclic movements of their forelegs, alternating actions with the left and right legs while also moving. There are variations in the choreography of these movements across species.

=== Silk web production ===
Embiopterans produce a silk thread similar to that produced by the silkworm, Bombyx mori. The silk is produced in spherical secretory glands in the swollen tarsi (lower leg segments) of the forelimbs, and can be produced by both adults and larvae. Unlike Bombyx mori and other silk-producing (and spinning) members of both Lepidoptera and Hymenoptera, which only have one pair of silk glands per individual, some species of embiid are estimated to have up to 300 silk glands: 150 in each forelimb. These glands are linked to a bristle-like cuticular process known as a silk ejector, and their exceedingly high numbers allow individuals to spin large amounts of silk very quickly, creating extensive galleries. The silk web is produced throughout all stages of the embiopteran lifespan, and requires modest energy output.

Webspinner silk is among the thinnest of all animal silks, being in most species about 90 to 100 nanometres in diameter. The finest of any insect are those of the webspinner Aposthonia gurneyi, averaging about 65 nanometres in diameter. Each thread consists of a protein core folded into pleated beta-sheets, with a water-repellent coating rich in waxy alkanes.

=== Galleries ===
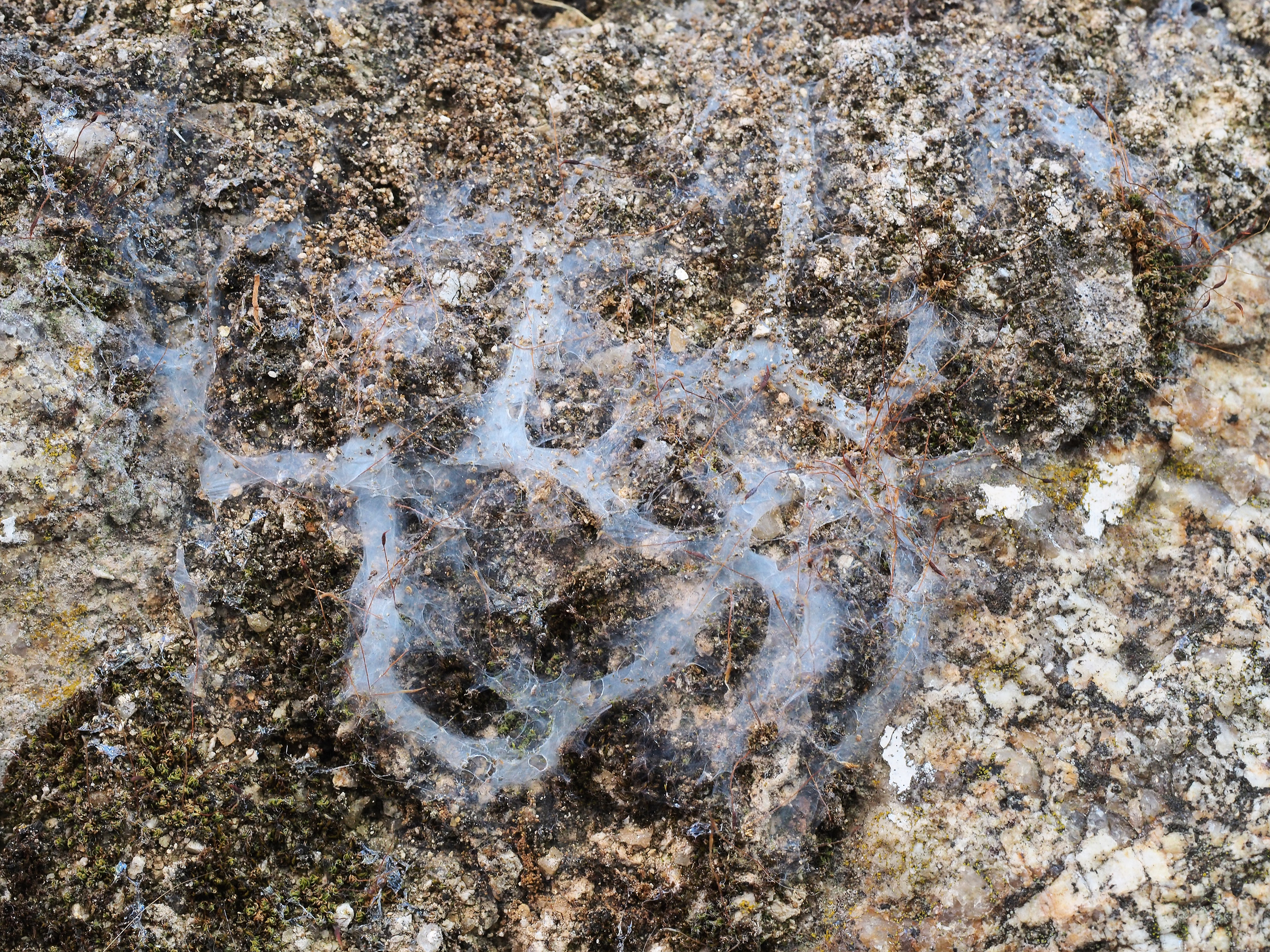
Web on a stone wall

The galleries produced by embiopterans are tunnels and chambers woven from the silk they produce. These woven constructions can be found on substrates such as rocks and the bark of trees, or in leaf litter. Some species camouflage their galleries by decorating the outer layers with bits of leaf litter or other materials to match their surroundings. The galleries are essential to their life cycle, maintaining moisture in their environment, and also offering protection from predators and the elements while foraging, breeding and simply existing. Embiopterans only leave the gallery complex in search of a mate, or when females explore the immediate area in search of a new food source.

Webspinners continually extend their galleries to reach new food sources, and expand their existing galleries as they grow in size. The insects spin silk by moving their forelegs back and forth over the substrate, and rotating their bodies to create a cylindrical, silk-lined tunnel. Older galleries have multiple laminate layers of silk. Each gallery complex contains several individuals, often descended from a single female, and forms a maze-like structure, extending from a secure retreat into whatever vegetable food matter is available nearby. The size and complexity of the colony vary between species, and they can be very extensive in those species that live in hot and humid climates.

=== Diet ===
The embiopteran diet varies between species, with available food sources changing with varying habitat. The nymphs and adult females feed on plant litter, bark, moss, algae and lichen. They are generalist herbivores; during his research, Ross maintained a number of species in the laboratory on a diet of lettuce and dry oak leaves. Adult males do not eat at all, dying soon after mating.

=== Parasites and predators ===
Sclerogibbidae is a small family of aculeate wasps that are specialist parasitoids of embiopterans. The wasp lays an egg on the abdomen of a nymph. The wasp larva emerges and attaches itself to the host's body, consuming the host's tissues as it grows. It eventually forms a cocoon and drops off the carcass. A Neotropical tachinid fly, Perumyia embiaphaga, and a braconid wasp species in the genus Sericobracon, are known to be parasitoids of adult embiopterans. A few scelionid wasps in the tribe Embidobiini are egg parasitoids of the Embioptera. A protozoan parasite in Italy effectively sterilises males, forcing the remaining female population to become parthenogenetic. These parasites and agents of disease may put evolutionary pressure on embiopterans to live more socially.

Adult webspinners are vulnerable when they emerge from their galleries, and are preyed on by birds, geckos, ants and spiders. They have been observed being attacked by owlfly larvae. Birds may pull sheets of silk off the galleries to expose their prey, ants may cut holes to gain entry and harvestmen may pierce the silk to feed on the webspinners inside.

=== Associates ===
Another group of associates inside the galleries are bugs in the family Plokiophilidae. Whether these are feeding on embiopteran eggs or larvae, on mites and other residents of the gallery, or are scavenging is unclear. The embiopteran Aposthonia ceylonica has been found living inside a colony of the Indian cooperative spider, probably feeding on algae growing on the spider sheetweb, and two webspinner species have been discovered living in the outer covering of termites' nests, where their silk galleries may protect them from attack.

== Distribution and habitat ==
Embiopterans are distributed worldwide, and are found on every continent except Antarctica, with the highest density and diversity of species being in tropical regions. Some common species have been accidentally transported to other parts of the world, while many native species are unobtrusive and yet to be detected. Some species live underground, or concealed under rocks or behind sections of loose bark. Others live out in the open, either swathed in sheets of white or blue silk, or hidden in less-conspicuous silken tubes, on the ground, on the trunks of trees or on the surface of granite rocks.

Largely restricted to warmer locations, webspinners are found as far north as the state of Virginia in the United States (38°N), and as high as 3,500 m (11,500 ft) in Ecuador. They were absent from Britain until 2019, when Aposthonia ceylonica, a southeast Asian species, was found in a glasshouse at the RHS Garden, Wisley.
