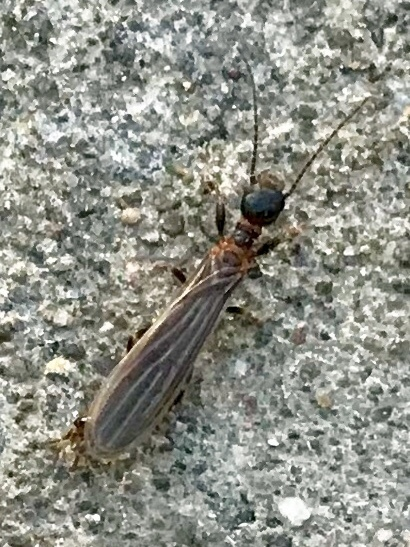

Scientific classification
- Domain: Eukaryota
- Kingdom: Animalia
- Phylum: Arthropoda
- Class: Insecta
- Order: Embioptera
- Family: Oligotomidae
- Genus: Oligotoma
- Species: O. saundersii

Binomial name
- Oligotoma saundersii (Westwood, 1837)

Synonyms
- Oligotoma bramina (Saussure, 1896); Oligotoma hova (Saussure, 1896)

= Oligotoma saundersii =

Species of insect

Oligotoma saundersii, commonly known as Saunders' embiid, is a species of webspinner, an insect in the order Embiidina, also known as Embioptera.

== Description ==
Adult males of this species have long narrow wings while adult females are flightless. The body of the male is dark brownish-black with a slight yellowish tinge, especially near the joints of the limbs. In the male, the head is paler than the rest of the body, which differentiates it from the otherwise similar Oligotoma nigra. The female is chocolate-brown and the nymphs are much paler, being yellowish-brown. The females and nymphs are difficult to distinguish from those of O. nigra, so they are best identified by association with the male. Like other members of the order, the tarsi of the front pair of legs are enlarged and equipped with about one hundred silk glands.

== Distribution ==
Oligotoma saundersii originated in southern Asia but has spread around the tropics as a result of human activities. It was introduced into the United States, and its range there now extends from Texas to Florida.

== Ecology ==
Like other species of webspinner, O. saundersii is very inconspicuous, living as it does in a silken tube that it weaves which is hidden away in a crevice or under the bark of a tree, or other similar humid location.

Researchers established a colony in the laboratory by placing two adult females and some eggs in a container with large flakes of bark behind which they could hide. The insects were supplied with dry goldfish food. Silken tubes were woven by the females after they had settled down, but the insects remained largely hidden, emerging only at night to feed. A male was seen some time later, indicating that the period to maturity was about four months. He produced his own longer tubes on the walls of the container, often remaining half out of the mouth of his gallery during the day, and sometimes venturing forth. The male did not feed, as is normal in this group, and lived for a few weeks. The eggs were laid in the tunnels and disguised within minutes by chewed bits of substrate so that they resembled the frass and substrate particles already adhering to the webbing; the eggs were not guarded by the female but the camouflage may have prevented cannibalism. The next batch of larvae was seen some two months after the male was observed. Before this, the galleries had been expanded, seemingly in anticipation of the larvae hatching. Further expansion of the colony followed.
