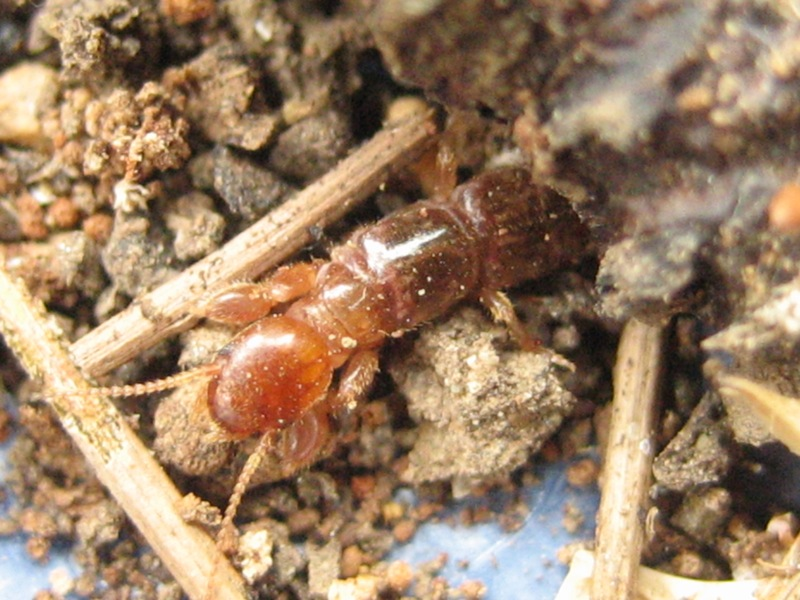

Scientific classification
- Kingdom: Animalia
- Phylum: Arthropoda
- Class: Insecta
- Order: Embioptera
- Family: Oligotomidae
- Genus: Haploembia
- Species: H. solieri

Binomial name
- Haploembia solieri (Rambur, 1842)

= Haploembia solieri =

Species of insect

Haploembia solieri or bicolored webspinner is a species of webspinner in the family Oligotomidae. It is found in Europe, Northern Asia (excluding China), and North America. Unlike Haploembia tarsalis, which reproduces asexually, H. solieri reproduces sexually. Adult specimens of H. solieri are orange and black and around 11 mm long.

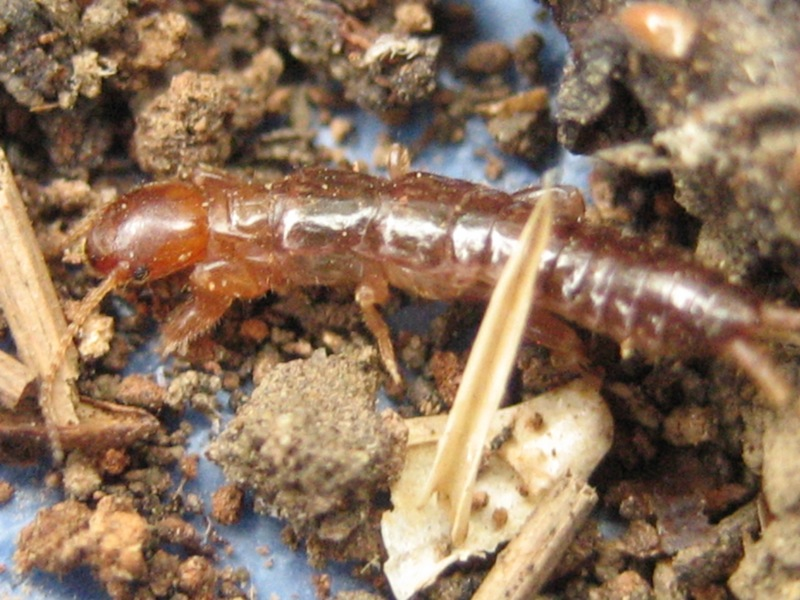
