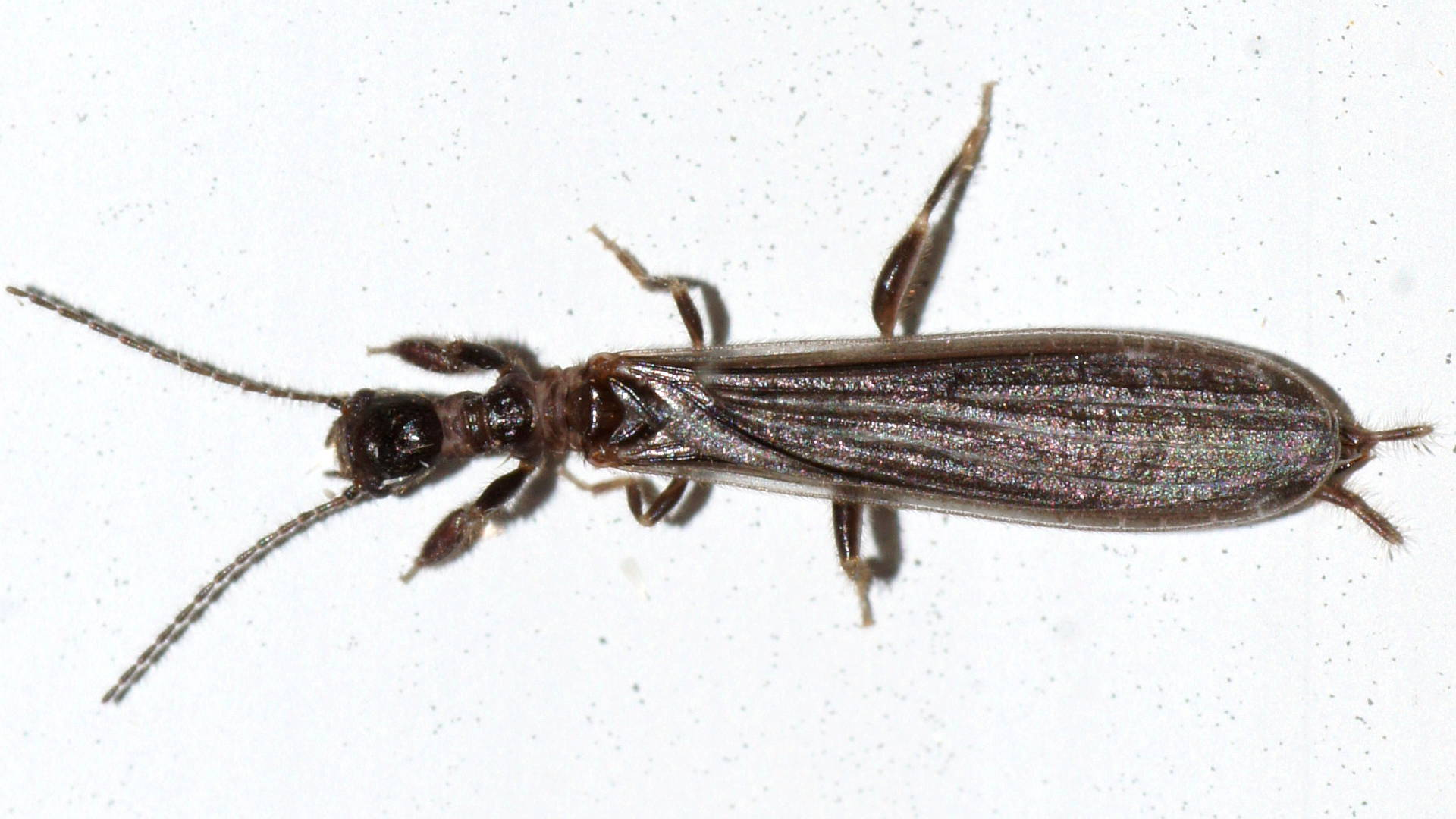

Scientific classification
- Kingdom: Animalia
- Phylum: Arthropoda
- Clade: Pancrustacea
- Class: Insecta
- Order: Embioptera
- Family: Oligotomidae
- Genus: Aposthonia
- Species: A. gurneyi

Binomial name
- Aposthonia gurneyi Froggatt, 1904

= Aposthonia gurneyi =

Species of insect

Aposthonia gurneyi is a species of webspinner of the family Oligotomidae native to Australia described by Walter Wilson Froggatt in 1904.
