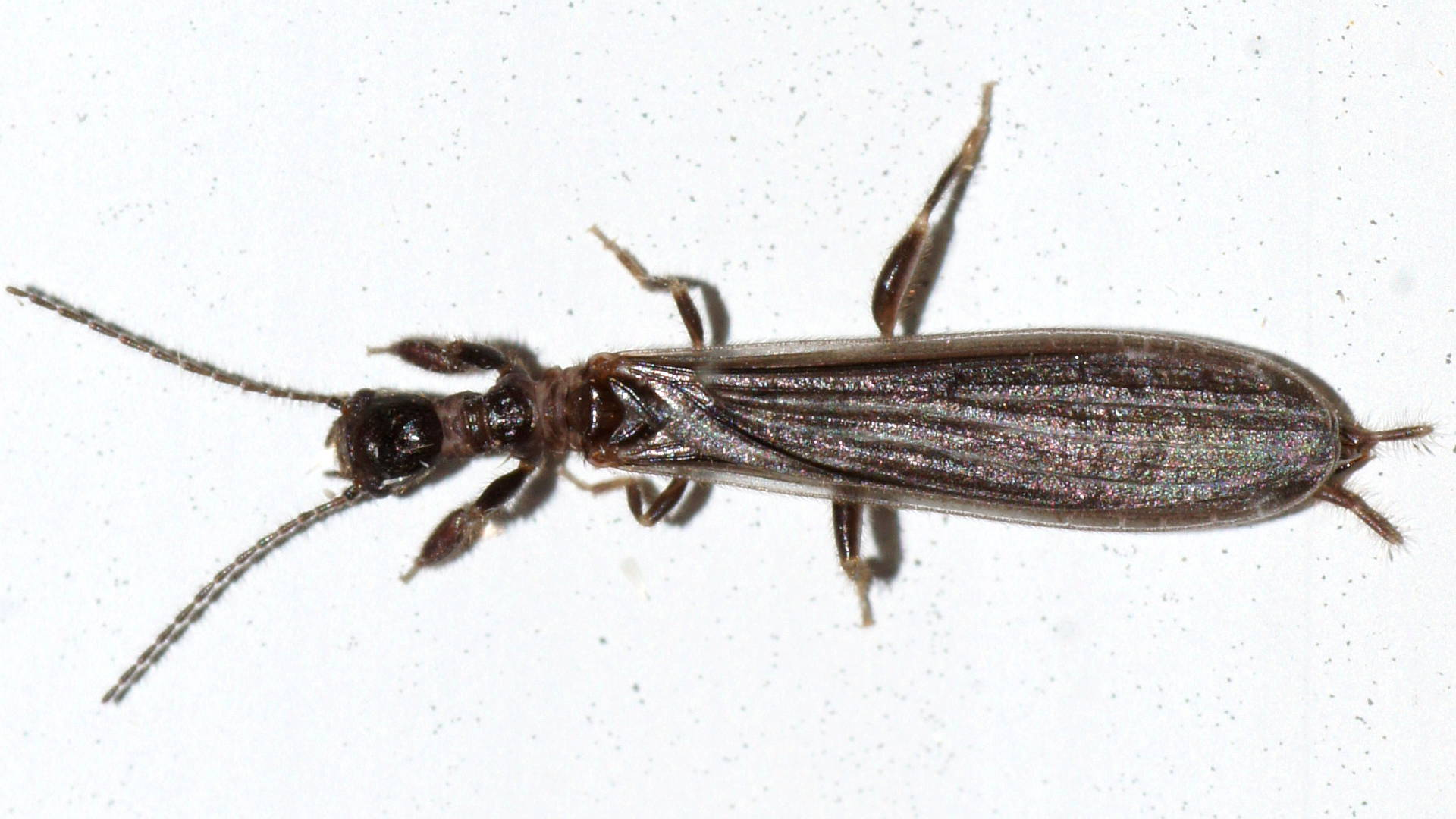
- Aposthonia gurneyi

Scientific classification
- Kingdom: Animalia
- Phylum: Arthropoda
- Clade: Pancrustacea
- Class: Insecta
- Order: Embioptera
- Family: Oligotomidae
- Genus: Aposthonia; Krauss, 1911

= Aposthonia =

Genus of insects

Aposthonia is a genus of webspinners of the family Oligotomidae. The genus was described by Krauss in 1911.

== Species ==
Species of this genus include

- Aposthonia aurea
- Aposthonia borneensis
- Aposthonia brunnea
- Aposthonia ceylonica
- Aposthonia davisi
- Aposthonia glauerti
- Aposthonia gurneyi
- Aposthonia hainanensis
- Aposthonia himalayensis
- Aposthonia hollandia
- Aposthonia jacobsoni
- Aposthonia japonica
- Aposthonia josephi
- Aposthonia maerens
- Aposthonia mandibulata
- Aposthonia maritima
- Aposthonia micronesiae
- Aposthonia oceania
- Aposthonia oculata
- Aposthonia tillyardi
- Aposthonia varians
- Aposthonia vosseleri
