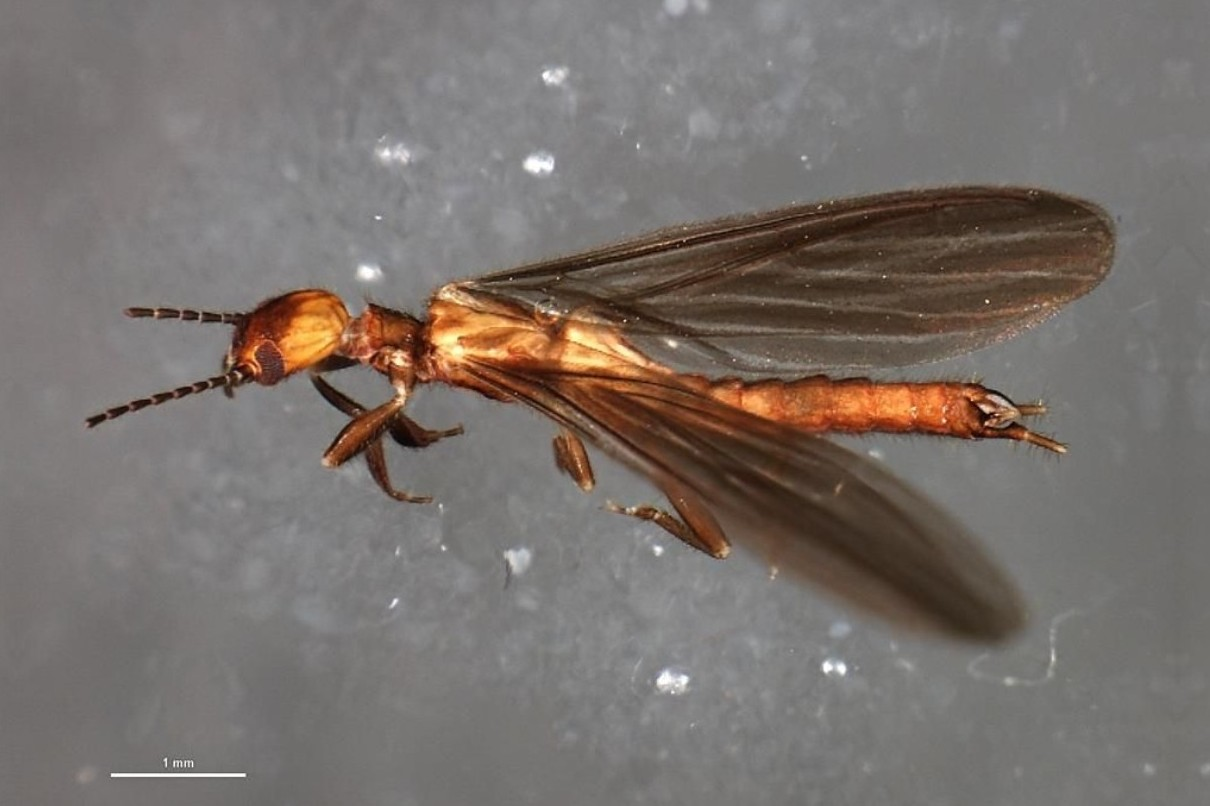
- Male

Scientific classification
- Kingdom: Animalia
- Phylum: Arthropoda
- Clade: Pancrustacea
- Class: Insecta
- Order: Embioptera
- Family: Oligotomidae
- Genus: Aposthonia
- Species: A. ceylonica

Binomial name
- Aposthonia ceylonica Enderlein, 1912

Synonyms
- Oligotoma ceylonica

= Aposthonia ceylonica =

Species of insect

Aposthonia ceylonica is a species of webspinner of the family Oligotomidae native to tropical Asia, Madagascar and Mauritius. In February 2019, a colony of this insect was identified in a greenhouse at the RHS Garden, Wisley, Surrey, England, on the roots of an orchid. It was thought that the insects had been accidentally introduced on plants imported from Thailand.

== Description ==
The body of the adult is cylindrical in form, long, slender and flexible, adapted for the tubular galleries in which the insects live. It is about 8 mm (0.3 in) long and has a head longer than it is wide. The eyes are dark, and the female's eyes are smaller than those of the male. The first thoracic segment is smaller than the second and third. The female is mid-brown on the head, the basal three segments of the 15-segment antennae, the anterior part of the thorax and the fore-legs, while the rest of the insect is dark brown. The female has no wings. The male is largely medium-brown, the antennae having 17 segments and being dark brown throughout. The male's wings are greyish-brown and the legs have pale joints.

== Distribution and habitat ==
Aposthonia ceylonica is native to tropical Africa and Asia, its range including Madagascar, Mauritius, India, Sri Lanka, Malaysia, Laos and Thailand. It is found on the bark of trees in both evergreen and deciduous forests, plantations, orchards and parks.

In February 2019, a colony of the species was found on the roots of an orchid at the Royal Horticultural Society's garden at Wisley, Surrey, England. As an introduced species it represents the first new order of insects to be found living in Great Britain since stick insects were discovered living in Devon in 1909.

== Ecology ==
Aposthonia ceylonica is semi-social, a group of insects living in a gallery of tunnels, usually an adult female and its nymphal offspring. After shedding its last nymphal skin, the male consumes the exuviae, and then does not feed again. He searches for a mate after which he will not live for long. The nymphs and the adult females are herbivorous. The female exhibits some degree of parental care of the eggs and newly hatched nymphs. Both male and female secrete silk, the male continuing to do so despite fasting, and in fact having larger silk glands than the female.

== Silk production ==
The adult insects spin fine silken threads composed of amino acids which are water repellent and have an alkane-rich surface coating. In natural surroundings, the webbing surrounding the colony prevents the insects from being swept off the bark by a tropical downpour and provides protection against predators.
