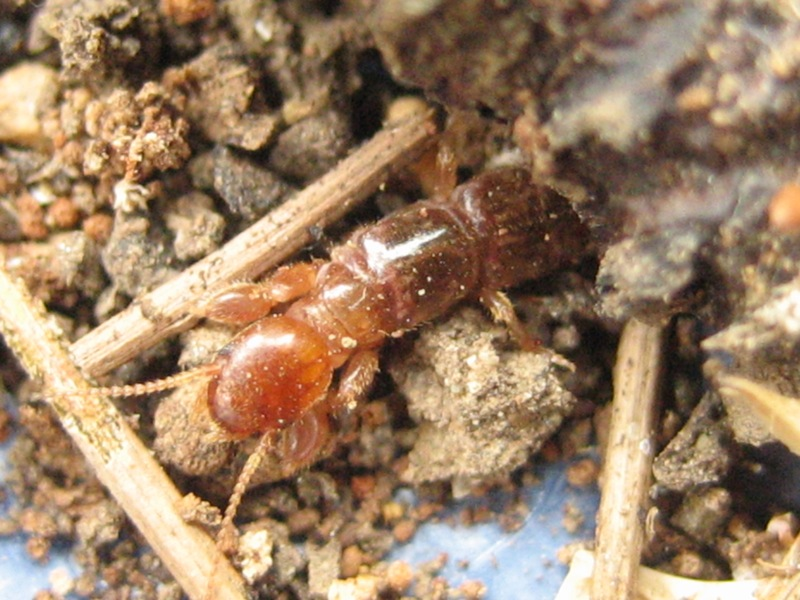
- Haploembia solieri

Scientific classification
- Domain: Eukaryota
- Kingdom: Animalia
- Phylum: Arthropoda
- Class: Insecta
- Order: Embioptera
- Family: Oligotomidae
- Genus: Haploembia; Verhoeff, 1904

= Haploembia =

Genus of insects

Haploembia is a genus of webspinners in the family Oligotomidae. There are at least three described species in Haploembia. They are native to the Mediterranean, but have been observed in the western United States, and are adventive elsewhere.

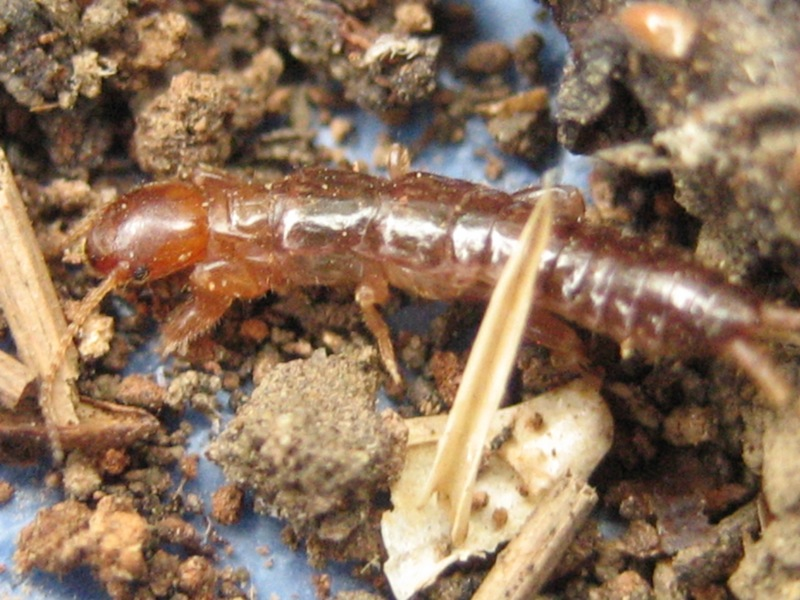
Haploembia solieri

== Species ==
These three species belong to the genus Haploembia:

- Haploembia palaui Stefani, 1955
- Haploembia solieri (Rambur, 1842)
- Haploembia tarsalis (Ross, 1940)
