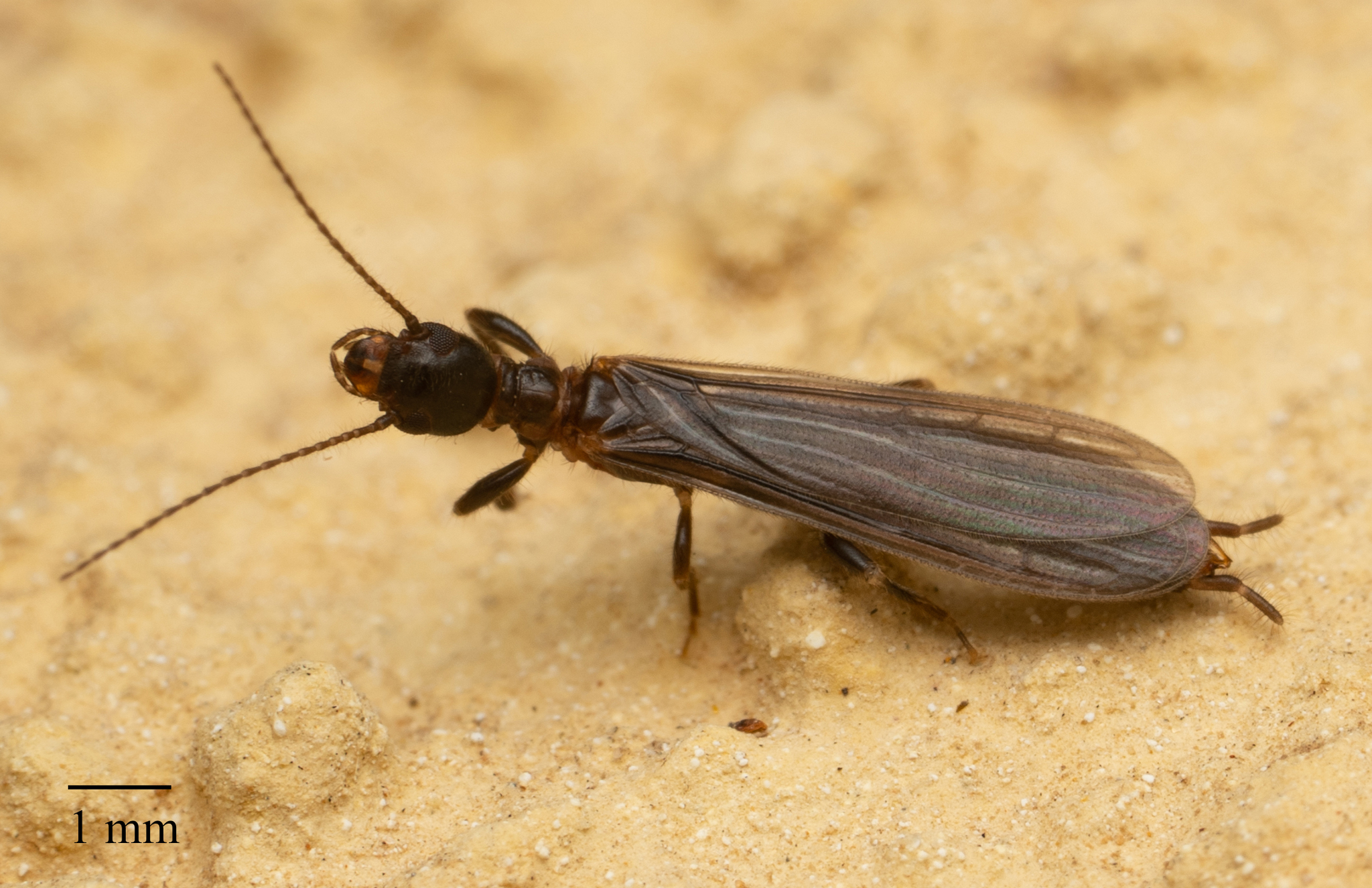

Scientific classification
- Kingdom: Animalia
- Phylum: Arthropoda
- Class: Insecta
- Order: Embioptera
- Family: Oligotomidae
- Genus: Oligotoma
- Species: O. nigra

Binomial name
- Oligotoma nigra Hagen, 1885

Synonyms
- Oligotoma californica (Banks, 1906); Oligotoma mesopotamica Ross, 1966

= Oligotoma nigra =

Species of insect

Oligotoma nigra, also known as the black webspinner, is a species of insect in the order Embiidina, also known as Embioptera.

== Description ==
The adult of this species tends to be entirely dark brown or black. They reach approximately 9 millimeters in length. Females tend to be redder in body color than males are. Only adult males have wings and are capable of flying. Adult males, unlike adult females, have an affinity for light. The nymphs are much paler than adults, and they darken in color as they mature.

== Life cycle ==
The entire life cycle of the black webspinner is typically completed within a year. They are a hemimetabolous insect species, meaning that they have incomplete metamorphosis. During developmental stages the nymphs produce silk from silk glands. The glands are located on the basal segment of the foretarsus. they use this ability to create silk tunnels for protection from predators and to store food. Eggs are laid within the silk tunnels. When the nymphs hatch they expand the network of tunnels. This network continues to expand as the insect matures. The vast majority of their life is spent within the silk tunnel.

== Distribution and habitat ==
This insect is originally from India; however, it is now found in other parts of the world. In America, it can be found from Texas to California up to Utah, covering much of the southwest region of the United States. It was most likely introduced to North America in the late 1800s during the shipping of date palm cuttings from the Persian Gulf Region.

During the day they spend most of their lives in silk tunnels beneath a rock or structure nearby a food source. In gardens their food source is frequently grass or some type of ornamental plant. They are often found near the base of palm trees, emerging from their tubes to feed on debris, dead plant material, mosses and lichens.
