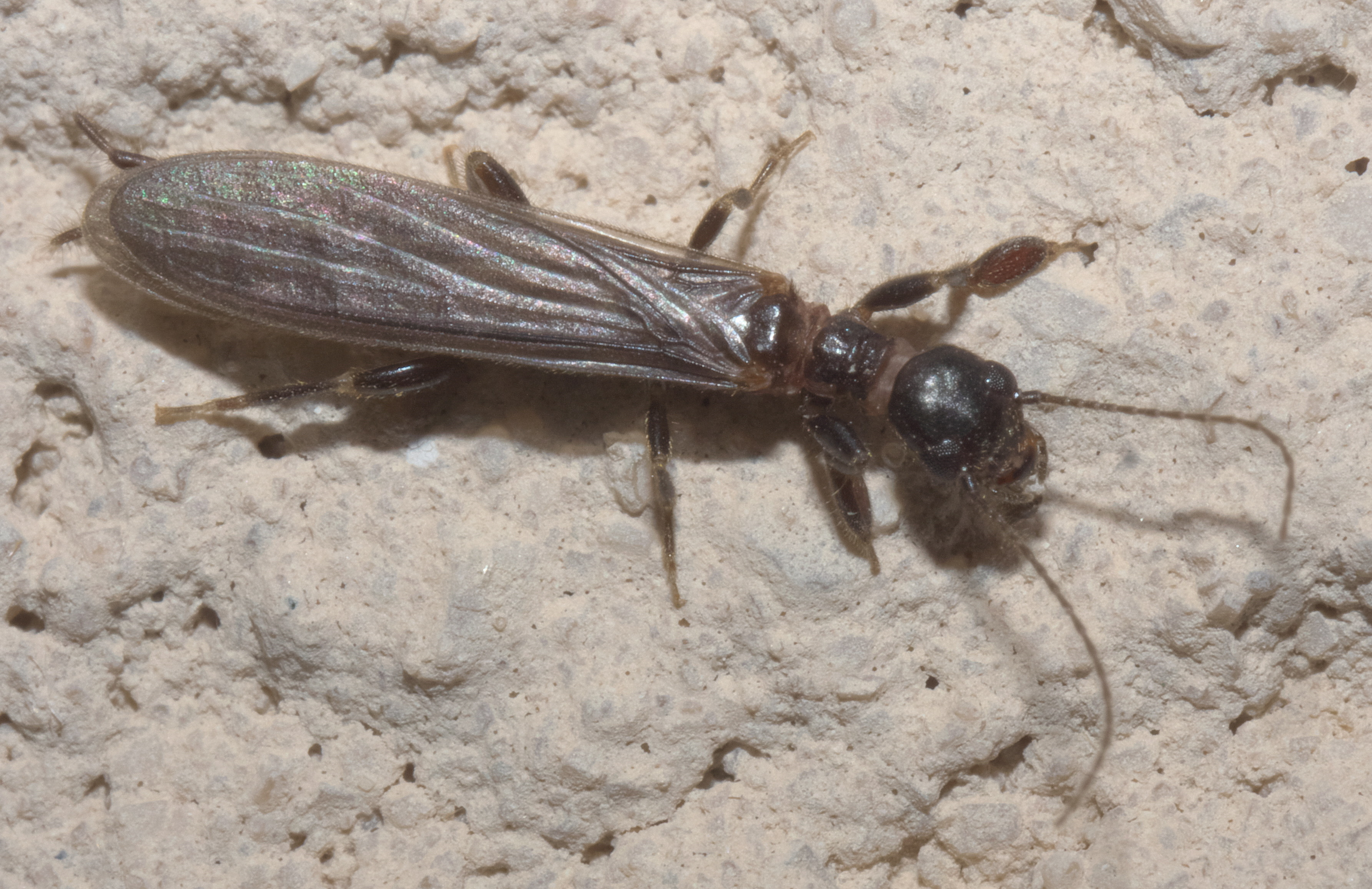
- Oligotoma sp.

Scientific classification
- Kingdom: Animalia
- Phylum: Arthropoda
- Class: Insecta
- Order: Embioptera
- Family: Oligotomidae
- Genus: Oligotoma; Westwood 1837

Species
- See text

= Oligotoma =

Genus of insects

Oligotoma is a genus of webspinners, insects in the order Embioptera, also known as Embiidina. The type species is Oligotoma saundersii and the type locality the Indian subcontinent. The males have wings but the females are flightless. Embiids are recognisable by the enlarged front tarsi, which contain a large number of silk glands that they use to spin the threads they use for building the tubes and galleries in which they live.

== Species ==
The Embioptera Species File lists the following species:-

- Oligotoma albertisi Navás, 1930
- Oligotoma approximans Davis, 1938
- Oligotoma aurea Ross, 1948
- Oligotoma brunnea Ross, 1948
- Oligotoma burmana Ross, 2007
- Oligotoma davisi Ross, 1948
- Oligotoma dharwariana Bradoo, 1971
- Oligotoma falcis Ross, 1943
- Oligotoma glauerti Tillyard, 1923
- Oligotoma greeniana Enderlein, 1912
- Oligotoma gurneyi Froggatt, 1904
- Oligotoma hollandia Ross, 1948
- Oligotoma humbertiana (Saussure, 1896)
- Oligotoma inaequalis Banks, 1924
- Oligotoma insularis McLachlan, 1877
- Oligotoma josephii Bradoo, 1971
- Oligotoma mandibulata Ross, 1948
- Oligotoma maritima Ross, 1948
- Oligotoma michaeli McLachlan, 1877
- Oligotoma nigra Hagen, 1885
- Oligotoma oculata Ross, 1948
- Oligotoma saundersii (Westwood, 1837)
- Oligotoma tillyardi Davis, 1936
- Oligotoma ubicki Ross, 2007
