= Haploembia tarsalis =

Scientific classification
- Kingdom: Animalia
- Phylum: Arthropoda
- Clade: Pancrustacea
- Class: Insecta
- Order: Embioptera
- Family: Oligotomidae
- Genus: Haploembia
- Species: H. tarsalis

Binomial name
- Haploembia tarsalis (Ross, 1940)

Species of insect

Haploembia tarsalis or the pink webspinner is a species of webspinner in the family Oligotomidae. It is originally from the Mediterranean, but was introduced to California before the 20th Century. H. tarsalis reproduces asexually through parthenogenesis, and only females are known. Adults are wingless, between 8–11 mm in length, and vary in color from pale orange to black. They live in silk tunnels that they spin in soil, leaf litter, and under stones and other debris.
