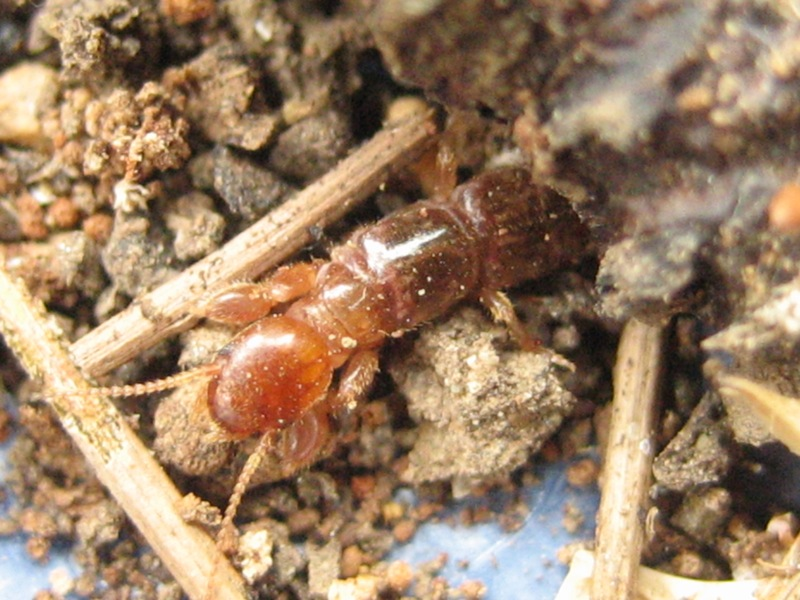
- Haploembia solieri

Scientific classification
- Kingdom: Animalia
- Phylum: Arthropoda
- Class: Insecta
- Order: Embioptera
- Family: Oligotomidae

= Oligotomidae =

Family of insects

Oligotomidae is a family of webspinners in the order Embioptera. There are about 6 genera and at least 40 described species in Oligotomidae.

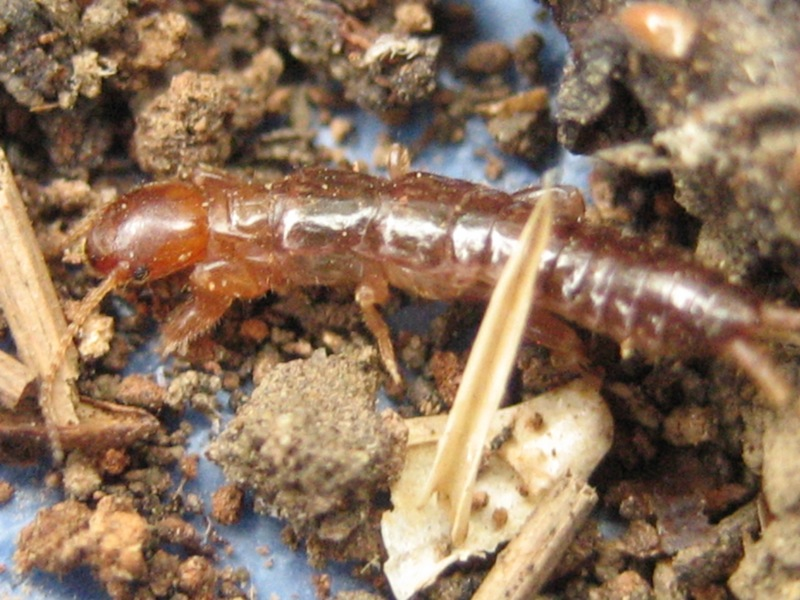
Haploembia solieri

They are known to be found in warmer regions of the Old World and in the Southwestern United States.

== Genera ==
These six genera belong to the family Oligotomidae:

- Aposthonia Krauss, 1911
  - Aposthonia ceylonica, native to South-East Asia, found to be present in the UK in 2019.
- Bulbosembia Ross, 2007
- Eosembia Ross, 2007
- Haploembia Verhoeff, 1904
- Lobosembia Ross, 2007
- Oligotoma Westwood, 1837
- †Litoclostes Engel & Huang, 2016
