= 2016 in paleoentomology =

2015 in paleoentomology is a list of new fossil insect taxa that were described during the year 2016, as well as other significant discoveries and events related to paleoentomology occurring during the year.

== New taxa ==
=== Coleoptera ===
Name	Novelty	Status	Authors	Age	Unit	Location	Notes	Images
Antarctotrechus	Gen. et sp. nov	Valid	Ashworth & Erwin	Probably Miocene	Meyer Desert Formation	Antarctica (Beardmore Glacier region)	A ground beetle. The type species is A. balli.	Antarctotrechus balli
Anthonomus dilatofemurus	Sp. nov	Valid	Poinar & Legalov in Legalov & Poinar	Tertiary		Mexico	A species of Anthonomus.	
Apriacma	Gen. et comb. nov	Valid	Kirejtshuk, Nel, & Kirejtshuk	Early Cretaceous	Yixian Formation	China	A reticulated beetle. The type species is "Priacma" tuberculosa Tan, Ren & Shin (2006); genus also includes "Priacma" clavata Tan, Ren & Shin (2006), "Priacma" renaria Tan, Ren & Shin (2006) and possibly "Priacma" latidentata Tan, Ren & Shin (2006).	
Archaeoeugnomus	Gen et sp. nov	Valid	Legalov	Eocene	Baltic amber	Europe (Baltic Sea coast)	A member of Curculionidae. The type species is A. balticus.	
Archeutheia	Gen. et comb. nov	Valid	Jałoszyński & Peris	Early Cretaceous (Albian)		Spain	A scydmaenine rove beetle belonging to the tribe Eutheiini; a new genus for "Kachinus" magnificus Peris, Chatzimanolis & Delclòs (2014).	
Attagenus (Aethriostoma) turonianensis	Sp. nov	Valid	Peris & Háva	Late Cretaceous (Turonian)	New Jersey Amber	United States	A species of Attagenus.	
Baltostigus	Gen. et 2 sp. nov	Valid	Jałoszyński	Early to middle Eocene		Lithuania; Poland	A scydmaenine rove beetle belonging to the tribe Mastigini. The type species is B. antennatus; genus also includes B. horribilis.	
Beattieellus	Gen. et sp. nov	Valid	Oberprieler et al.	Late Jurassic	Talbragar Fish Bed	Australia	A member of Eucnemidae. The type species is B. jurassicus.	
Boreotethys	Gen. et 2 sp. nov	Valid	Parker	Cretaceous (~99 mya)		Myanmar	A rove beetle belonging to the subfamily Pselaphinae. The type species is B. grimaldii; genus also includes B. arctopteryx.	
Brochocoleus caseyi	Sp. nov	Valid	Jarzembowski, Wang & Zheng	Cretaceous	Burmese amber	Myanmar	A member of Ommatinae. Originally described as a species of Brochocoleus; Kirejtshuk (2020) transferred it to the separate genus Jarzembowskiops.	
Cainocups	Gen et Sp nov.	Valid	Kirejtshuk, Nel, & Kirejtshuk	Chattian	Niveau du gypse d'Aix Formation	France	A reticulated beetle	Cainocups aixensis
Canthochilum alleni	Sp. nov	Valid	Tarasov & Vaz-de-Mello in Tarasov et al.	Probably Miocene	Dominican amber	Dominican Republic	A species of Canthochilum.	
Canthochilum philipsivieorum	Sp. nov	Valid	Tarasov & Vaz-de-Mello in Tarasov et al.	Probably Miocene	Dominican amber	Dominican Republic	A species of Canthochilum.	
Carcinops donelaitisi	Sp. nov	Valid	Alekseev	Eocene	Baltic amber	Russia (Kaliningrad Oblast)	A member of Histeridae.	
Catogenus punctatus	Sp. nov	Valid	Ramírez, Corsolini & Di Iorio	Eocene	Huitrera Formation	Argentina	A beetle of uncertain phylogenetic placement. Originally described as a member of the family Passandridae and a species of Catogenus; Jin et al. (2019) transferred this species to the family Cucujidae and to the genus Platisus, while Jin et al. (2020) transferred it to the genus Thesaurus.	
Caulophilus ayotzinapa	Sp. nov	Valid	Barrios-Izás in Barrios-Izás & Coty	Late Oligocene to middle Miocene		Mexico	A member of Curculionidae belonging to the subfamily Cossoninae, a species of Caulophilus.	
Caulophilus rarus	Sp. nov	Valid	Legalov	Eocene	Baltic amber	Europe (Baltic Sea coast)	A member of Curculionidae.	
Caulophilus squamosus	Sp. nov	Valid	Legalov	Eocene	Baltic amber	Europe (Baltic Sea coast)	A member of Curculionidae.	
Ceafornotensis	Gen. et sp. nov	Valid	Woolley	Late Cretaceous (Turonian)	Orapa diamond mine	Botswana	A member of Scarabaeidae belonging to the subfamily Melolonthinae. The type species is C. archratiras.	Ceafornotensis archatiras
Cephennomicrus giganteus	Sp. nov	Valid	Jałoszyński & Perkovsky	Late Eocene	Rovno amber	Ukraine	A scydmaenine rove beetle belonging to the tribe Cephenniini.	
Ceutorhynchus alekseevi	Sp. nov	Valid	Legalov	Eocene	Baltic amber	Europe (Baltic Sea coast)	A member of Curculionidae.	
Ceutorhynchus electrinus	Sp. nov	Valid	Legalov	Eocene	Baltic amber	Europe (Baltic Sea coast)	A member of Curculionidae.	
Choragus exsertus	Sp. nov	Valid	Poinar & Legalov	Eocene or Miocene	Dominican amber	Dominican Republic	A member of Anthribidae belonging to the subfamily Choraginae and the tribe Choragini, a species of Choragus.	
Clypastraea primainterpares	Sp. nov	Valid	Alekseev	Eocene	Baltic amber	Russia (Kaliningrad Oblast)	A member of Corylophidae.	
Coproporus electron	Sp. nov	Valid	Yamamoto in Yamamoto & Takahashi	Miocene	Dominican amber	Dominican Republic	A rove beetle.	
Crepidodera tertiotertiaria	Sp. nov	Valid	Bukejs, Biondi & Alekseev	Eocene	Baltic amber	Europe (Baltic Sea coast)	A species of Crepidodera.	
Cretohypna puncta	Sp. nov	Valid	Zhao et al.	Early Cretaceous	Yixian Formation	China	A member of Glaphyridae, a species of Cretohypna.	
Cretohypna robusta	Sp. nov	Valid	Zhao et al.	Early Cretaceous	Yixian Formation	China	A member of Glaphyridae, a species of Cretohypna.	
Cretoleptochromus	Gen. et sp. nov	Disputed	Cai & Huang	Late Cretaceous (early Cenomanian)	Burmese amber	Myanmar	A scydmaenine rove beetle belonging to the supertribe Mastigitae. The type species is Cretoleptochromus archaicus. Jałoszyński et al. (2018) considered the genus Cretoleptochromus to be a junior synonym of the genus Clidicus.	
Cretomerga	Gen. et comb. nov	Valid	Kirejtshuk, Nel, & Kirejtshuk	Early Cretaceous	Yixian Formation	China	A reticulated beetle. The type species is "Priacmopsis" subtilis Tan & Ren (2006).	
Cretosynstrophus	Gen. et sp. nov	Valid	Cai, Hsiao & Huang	Late Cretaceous (Cenomanian)	Burmese amber	Myanmar	A member of Tetratomidae belonging to the subfamily Eustrophinae. The type species is Cretosynstrophus archaicus.	
Cupes distinctissimus	Sp nov.	Valid	Kirejtshuk, Nel, & Kirejtshuk	Thanetian	Menat Formation	France	A reticulated beetle	Cupes distinctissimus
Cupes simillimus	Sp nov.	Valid	Kirejtshuk, Nel, & Kirejtshuk	Thanetian	Menat Formation	France	A reticulated beetle	Cupes simillimus
Cupopsis	Gen. et comb. nov	Valid	Kirejtshuk, Nel, & Kirejtshuk	Late Cretaceous (Turonian)	Raritan Formation	United States	A reticulated beetle. The type species is "Paracupes" svetkoi Lubkin (2003).	
Cyptoxenus buchelus	Sp. nov	Valid	Poinar & Legalov	Eocene or Miocene	Dominican amber	Dominican Republic	A member of Anthribidae belonging to the subfamily Choraginae and the tribe Valenfriesiini, a species of Cyptoxenus.	
Cyptoxenus ovatus	Sp. nov	Valid	Poinar & Legalov	Eocene or Miocene	Dominican amber	Dominican Republic	A member of Anthribidae belonging to the subfamily Choraginae and the tribe Valenfriesiini, a species of Cyptoxenus.	
Derolathrus groehni	Sp. nov	Valid	Cai et al.	Eocene	Baltic amber	Europe (Baltic Sea coast)	A member of Jacobsoniidae, a species of Derolathrus.	
Dicentrus mehli	Sp. nov	Valid	Vitali & Daamgard	Probably early Oligocene	Baltic amber	Europe (Baltic Sea coast)	A species of Dicentrus.	
Diodesma slipinskii	Sp. nov	Valid	Alekseev & Bukejs	Eocene	Baltic amber	Europe (Baltic Sea coast)	A member of Zopheridae.	
Dorytomus electrinus	Sp. nov	Valid	Legalov	Eocene	Baltic amber	Russia (Kaliningrad Oblast)	A weevil belonging to the subfamily Curculioninae and the tribe Ellescini.	
Dorytomus nudus	Sp. nov	Valid	Legalov	Eocene	Baltic amber	Europe (Baltic Sea coast)	A member of Curculionidae.	
Electrocaryedon	Gen. et sp. nov	Valid	Legalov	Late Eocene	Baltic amber	Europe (Baltic Sea coast)	A bean weevil. The type species is Electrocaryedon poinari.	
Electrolichas	Gen. et sp. nov	Valid	Alekseev & Jäch	Eocene	Baltic amber	Europe (Baltic Sea coast)	A member of Byrrhoidea belonging to the family Ptilodactylidae and the subfamily Anchytarsinae. The type species is E. circumbalticus.	
Endophloeus gorskii	Sp. nov	Valid	Alekseev & Bukejs	Eocene	Baltic amber	Europe (Baltic Sea coast)	A member of Zopheridae.	
Eocenesibinia	Gen et sp. nov	Valid	Legalov	Eocene	Baltic amber	Europe (Baltic Sea coast)	A member of Curculionidae. The type species is E. prussica.	
Eopiestus	Gen. et sp. nov	Valid	Cai & Lü in Cai et al.	Eocene	Baltic amber	Russia (Kaliningrad Oblast)	A rove beetle belonging to the subfamily Piestinae. Genus includes new species E. groehni.	
Euconnus palaeogenus	Sp. nov	Valid	Jałoszyński & Perkovsky	Late Eocene	Rovno amber	Ukraine	A scydmaenine rove beetle belonging to the tribe Glandulariini.	
Eugonus adustus	Sp. nov	Valid	Poinar & Legalov	Eocene or Miocene	Dominican amber	Dominican Republic	A member of Anthribidae belonging to the subfamily Anthribinae and the tribe Eugonini, a species of Eugonus.	
Eugonus angustus	Sp. nov	Valid	Poinar & Legalov	Eocene or Miocene	Dominican amber	Dominican Republic	A member of Anthribidae belonging to the subfamily Anthribinae and the tribe Eugonini, a species of Eugonus.	
Euparius elongatus	Sp. nov	Valid	Poinar & Legalov	Miocene		Mexico	A member of Anthribidae belonging to the subfamily Anthribinae and the tribe Cratoparini, a species of Euparius.	
Eurapatophysis	Gen. et sp. nov	Valid	Vitali	Early Oligocene	Baltic amber	Russia (Kaliningrad Oblast)	A longhorn beetle belonging to the tribe Apatophyseini. The type species is E. groehni.	
Flabellotoma	Gen. et sp. nov	Valid	Batelka, Prokop & Engel	Cenomanian	Burmese amber	Myanmar	A member of Ripiphoridae belonging to the subfamily Pelecotominae. The type species is F. heidiae.	
Glaesoconnus	Gen. et sp. nov	Valid	Jałoszyński & Perkovsky	Late Eocene	Rovno amber	Ukraine	A scydmaenine rove beetle belonging to the tribe Glandulariini. The type species is G. unicus.	
Habropezus	Gen. et sp. nov	Valid	Poinar, Brown & Legalov	Cretaceous	Burmese amber	Myanmar	Originally interpreted as a relative of the New York weevil, but subsequently transferred to the weevil family Mesophyletidae and the subfamily Mesophyletinae. The type species is H. plaisiommus. Announced in 2016; Legalov (2023) subsequently republished the description, stating that the journal where the original article was published does not have a printed version, and that the original article lacked information on registration in the ZooBank.	Habropezus plaisiommus
Hybosorus ocampoi	Sp. nov	Valid	Bai & Zhang in Bai et al.	Late Cretaceous (early Cenomanian)	Burmese amber	Myanmar	A member of Hybosoridae, a species of Hybosorus.	
Ischalia youngi	Sp. nov	Valid	Alekseev & Telnov	Priabonian	Prussian Formation (Baltic amber)	Russia (Kaliningrad Oblast)	A member of Ischaliidae.	
Isotrilophus rasnitsyni	Sp. nov	jr synopnym	Odnosum & Perkovsky	Eocene	Green River Formation	United States	A member of Mordellidae. First described as a Isotrilophus species; Moved to the collective group †Petrimordella (2023).	
Leiosoma (Palaeoleiosoma) klebsi	Subgen. et sp. nov	Valid	Legalov	Eocene	Baltic amber	Europe (Baltic Sea coast)	A member of Curculionidae, a species of Leiosoma.	
Lidryops	Gen. et sp. nov	Valid	Kirejtshuk & Nel	Early Cretaceous		France	A member of Byrrhidae. The type species is L. occultus.	
Lilioceris groehni	Sp. nov	Valid	Bukejs & Schmitt	Eocene	Baltic amber	Russia (Kaliningrad Oblast)	A species of Lilioceris.	
Megalopinus extinctus	Sp. nov	Valid	Yamamoto & Solodovnikov	Late Cretaceous (Cenomanian)	Burmese amber	Myanmar	A rove beetle belonging to the subfamily Megalopsidiinae; a species of Megalopinus.	
Mekorhamphus	Gen. et sp. nov	Valid	Poinar, Brown & Legalov	Cenomanian	Burmese amber	Myanmar	Originally interpreted as a relative of the New York weevil, but subsequently transferred to the weevil family Mesophyletidae and the subfamily Mesophyletinae. The type species is M. gyralommus. Announced in 2016; Legalov (2023) subsequently republished the description, stating that the journal where the original article was published does not have a printed version, and that the original article lacked information on registration in the ZooBank.	
Menatops	Gen. et comb. et sp. nov	Valid	Kirejtshuk, Nel, & Kirejtshuk	Thanetian	Menat Formation	France	A reticulated beetle. The type species is "Cupes" orbiculatus Kirejtshuk, Nel & Colomb (2010); genus also includes new species M. bartenevi.	
Mesocupes (Cainomerga) brevicornis	Sp nov.	Valid	Kirejtshuk, Nel, & Kirejtshuk	Thanetian	Menat Formation	France	A reticulated beetle. Kirejtshuk (2020) transferred this species to the separate genus Cainomerga.	Mesocupes (Cainomerga) brevicornis
Mesocupes (Cainomerga) fraternus	Sp nov.	Valid	Kirejtshuk, Nel, & Kirejtshuk	Thanetian	Menat Formation	France	A reticulated beetle. Kirejtshuk (2020) transferred this species to the separate genus Cainomerga.	
Mesocupes (Cainomerga) palaeocenicus	Sp nov.	Valid	Kirejtshuk, Nel, & Kirejtshuk	Thanetian	Menat Formation	France	A reticulated beetle. Kirejtshuk (2020) transferred this species to the separate genus Cainomerga.	Mesocupes (Cainomerga) palaeocenicus
Mesocupes (Cainomerga) ponti	Sp nov.	Valid	Kirejtshuk, Nel, & Kirejtshuk	Thanetian	Menat Formation	France	A reticulated beetle. Kirejtshuk (2020) transferred this species to the separate genus Cainomerga.	Mesocupes (Cainomerga) ponti
Mesosymbion	Gen. et sp. nov	Valid	Yamamoto, Maruyama & Parker	Late Cretaceous (Cenomanian)	Burmese amber	Myanmar	A rove beetle belonging to the subfamily Aleocharinae and the tribe Mesoporini. The type species is M. compactus.	
Micromalthus priabonicus	Sp. nov	Valid	Perkovsky	Late Eocene	Rovno amber	Ukraine	A relative of the telephone-pole beetle.	
Mistran	Gen. et sp. nov	Valid	Alekseev & Bukejs	Eocene	Baltic amber	Europe (Baltic Sea coast)	A member of Silvanidae. The type species is M. ot.	
Nalassus klebsi	Sp. nov	Valid	Nabozhenko, Perkovsky & Chernei	Eocene	Baltic amber	Europe (Baltic Sea coast)	A darkling beetle. Originally described as a species of Nalassus; Nabozhenko, Chigray & Bukejs (2019) transferred this species to the genus Stenohelops.	
Neolitochropus	Gen. et sp. nov	Valid	Lyubarsky & Perkovsky	Late Eocene	Bitterfeld amber	Germany	A beetle of uncertain phylogenetic placement. Originally described as a member of Phalacridae; Gimmel et al. (2019) transferred it to the family Cyclaxyridae. The type species is N. hoffeinsorum. Gimmel et al. (2019) considered the type species to be a junior synonym of "Stilbus" bedovoyi Lyubarsky & Perkovsky (2011), while maintaining it in the separate genus Neolitochropus, resulting in a new combination Neolitochropus bedovoyi.	
Neoxenus globosus	Sp. nov	Valid	Poinar & Legalov	Eocene or Miocene	Dominican amber	Dominican Republic	A member of Anthribidae belonging to the subfamily Choraginae and the tribe Valenfriesiini, a species of Neoxenus.	
Orchestes tatjanae	Sp. nov	Valid	Legalov	Eocene	Baltic amber	Europe (Baltic Sea coast)	A member of Curculionidae, a species of Orchestes.	
Ornatomalthinus	Gen. et sp. nov	Valid	Poinar & Fanti	Early Cretaceous (late Albian)	Burmese amber	Myanmar	A soldier beetle. The type species is O. elvirae.	
Oxycraspedus poinari	Sp. nov	Valid	Legalov	Eocene	Baltic amber	Russia (Kaliningrad Oblast)	A weevil belonging to the subfamily Oxycoryninae and the tribe Oxycraspedini.	
Pachytychius eocenicus	Sp. nov	Valid	Legalov	Eocene	Baltic amber	Europe (Baltic Sea coast)	A member of Curculionidae.	
Palaeodexipeus	Gen. et sp. nov	Valid	Legalov	Eocene	Baltic amber	Russia (Kaliningrad Oblast)	A weevil belonging to the subfamily Dryophthorinae and the tribe Stromboscerini. The type species is P. kirejtshuki.	
Palaeorhamphus	Gen et sp. nov	Valid	Legalov	Eocene	Baltic amber	Europe (Baltic Sea coast)	A member of Curculionidae. The type species is P. primitivus.	
Palaeoxenus sinensis	Sp. nov	Valid	Chang, Muona & Teräväinen in Chang et al.	Early Cretaceous	Yixian Formation	China	A false click beetle, a species of Palaeoxenus.	
Paleosiagonium	Gen. et 2 sp. nov	Valid	Yue et al.	Early Cretaceous	Yixian Formation	China	A rove beetle belonging to the subfamily Piestinae. Genus includes Paleosiagonium brevelytratum and Paleosiagonium adaequatum.	
Palpattalus	Gen. et 2 sp. nov	Valid	Tshernyshev	Eocene	Baltic amber	Europe (Baltic Sea coast)	A member of Malachiidae belonging to the tribe Attalini. Genus includes new species P. baltiensis and P. eocenicus.	
Paraphloeostiba electrica	Sp. nov	Valid	Zanetti, Perreau & Solodovnikov	Eocene-early Oligocene	Baltic amber	Europe (Baltic Sea coast)	A rove beetle belonging to the subfamily Omaliinae; a species of Paraphloeostiba.	
Passalopalpus	Gen. et sp. nov	Valid	Boucher et al.	Late Cretaceous (earliest Cenomanian)	Burmese amber	Myanmar	A member of Scarabaeoidea, possibly closely related to the family Passalidae. The type species is Passalopalpus cheni.	
Passandra septentrionaria	Sp. nov	Valid	Bukejs, Alekseev & McKellar	Eocene	Baltic amber	Europe (Baltic Sea coast)	A species of Passandra.	
Peltis antehercynica	Sp. nov	Valid	Kolibáč et al.	Late Pliocene		Germany	A member of Trogossitidae.	
Phyllodrepa antiqua	Sp. nov	Valid	Zanetti, Perreau & Solodovnikov	Eocene-early Oligocene	Baltic amber	Europe (Baltic Sea coast)	A rove beetle belonging to the subfamily Omaliinae; a species of Phyllodrepa.	
Piesocorynus bibullus	Sp. nov	Valid	Poinar & Legalov	Eocene or Miocene	Dominican amber	Dominican Republic	A member of Anthribidae belonging to the subfamily Anthribinae and the tribe Piesocorynini, a species of Piesocorynus.	
Piesocorynus brevitectus	Sp. nov	Valid	Poinar & Legalov	Miocene		Mexico	A member of Anthribidae belonging to the subfamily Anthribinae and the tribe Piesocorynini, a species of Piesocorynus.	
Piesocorynus elongatus	Sp. nov	Valid	Poinar & Legalov	Miocene		Mexico	A member of Anthribidae belonging to the subfamily Anthribinae and the tribe Piesocorynini, a species of Piesocorynus.	
Piesocorynus hamus	Sp. nov	Valid	Poinar & Legalov	Eocene or Miocene	Dominican amber	Dominican Republic	A member of Anthribidae belonging to the subfamily Anthribinae and the tribe Piesocorynini, a species of Piesocorynus.	
Piesocorynus parategus	Sp. nov	Valid	Poinar & Legalov	Miocene		Mexico	A member of Anthribidae belonging to the subfamily Anthribinae and the tribe Piesocorynini, a species of Piesocorynus.	
Piesocorynus parvocorpus	Sp. nov	Valid	Poinar & Legalov	Miocene		Mexico	A member of Anthribidae belonging to the subfamily Anthribinae and the tribe Piesocorynini, a species of Piesocorynus.	
Piesocorynus tribullus	Sp. nov	Valid	Poinar & Legalov	Eocene or Miocene	Dominican amber	Dominican Republic	A member of Anthribidae belonging to the subfamily Anthribinae and the tribe Piesocorynini, a species of Piesocorynus.	
Piesocorynus unibullus	Sp. nov	Valid	Poinar & Legalov	Eocene or Miocene	Dominican amber	Dominican Republic	A member of Anthribidae belonging to the subfamily Anthribinae and the tribe Piesocorynini, a species of Piesocorynus.	
Piesocorynus villosus	Sp. nov	Valid	Poinar & Legalov	Miocene		Mexico	A member of Anthribidae belonging to the subfamily Anthribinae and the tribe Piesocorynini, a species of Piesocorynus.	
Piezobarra brevisensoriata	Sp. nov	Valid	Poinar & Legalov	Eocene or Miocene	Dominican amber	Dominican Republic	A member of Anthribidae belonging to the subfamily Anthribinae and the tribe Piesocorynini, a species of Piezobarra.	
Platycteniopus	Gen. et sp. nov	Valid	Chang et al.	Early Cretaceous	Yixian Formation	China	A darkling beetle. The type species is Platycteniopus diversoculatus.	
Procileoporus	Gen. et sp. nov	Valid	Yamamoto	Late Cretaceous (Cenomanian)	Burmese amber	Myanmar	A rove beetle belonging to the subfamily Tachyporinae. The type species is Procileoporus burmiticus.	
Protoceletes hirtus	Sp. nov	Valid	Nazarenko & Perkovsky	Eocene	Rovno amber	Ukraine	A member of Curculionidae belonging to the subfamily Curculioninae and the tribe Acalyptini.	
Protocephaloncus	Gen. et sp. nov	Valid	Tshernyshev	Eocene	Rovno amber	Ukraine	A member of Malachiidae belonging to the tribe Troglopini. The type species is P. perkovskyi.	
Protoclerus	Gen. et sp. nov	Valid	Kolibáč & Huang	Middle Jurassic (Callovian)		China	A member of Cleridae. Genus includes new species P. korynetoides.	
Protodasycerus	Gen. et sp. nov	Valid	Yamamoto	Late Cretaceous	Burmese amber	Myanmar	A dasycerine rove beetle. The type species is Protodasycerus aenigmaticus.	
Protrichonyx	Gen. et sp. nov	Valid	Parker	Cenomanian	Burmese amber	Myanmar	A rove beetle belonging to the subfamily Pselaphinae. The type species is Protrichonyx rafifrons.	
Pseudochrysomelites humeralis	Sp. nov	Valid	Ponomarenko	Early Triassic (Olenekian)	Rybinsk Formation	Russia	A member of the family Schizocoleidae.	
Pseudochrysomelites tumidus	Sp. nov	Valid	Ponomarenko	Early Triassic (Induan)	Vokhma Formation	Russia	A member of the family Schizocoleidae.	
Ptisma	Gen. et sp. nov	Valid	Kirejtshuk et al.	Early Cretaceous		Lebanon	A member of Staphyliniformia of uncertain phylogenetic placement. The type species is Ptisma zasukhae.	
Rhagonycha sucinobaltica	Sp. nov	Valid	Poinar & Fanti	Eocene (Lutetian)	Baltic amber	Russia (Kaliningrad Oblast)	A soldier beetle, a species of Rhagonycha.	
Rovnoleptochromus	Gen. et sp. nov	Valid	Jałoszyński & Perkovsky	Late Eocene	Rovno amber	Ukraine	A scydmaenine rove beetle belonging to the tribe Clidicini. The type species is R. ableptonoides.	
Rovnoscydmus	Gen. et 2 sp. nov	Valid	Jałoszyński & Perkovsky	Late Eocene	Rovno amber	Ukraine	A scydmaenine rove beetle belonging to the tribe Glandulariini. The type species is R. frontalis; genus also includes R. microscopicus.	
Schizocoleus triassicus	Sp. nov	Valid	Ponomarenko	Early Triassic (Olenekian)	Rybinsk Formation	Russia	A member of the family Schizocoleidae.	
Scuccinalophus	Gen. et sp. nov	Valid	Legalov	Eocene	Baltic amber	Russia (Kaliningrad Oblast)	A weevil belonging to the subfamily Entiminae and the tribe Tropiphorini. The type species is S. attenboroughi. The generic name is spelled Succinalophus on some pages of the paper describing the taxon.	
Scydmobisetia	Gen. et sp. nov	Valid	Jałoszyński & Yamamoto in Jałoszyński, Yamamoto & Takahashi	Late Cretaceous (Cenomanian)	Burmese amber	Myanmar	A scydmaenine rove beetle belonging to the tribe Glandulariini. The type species is Scydmobisetia vetutissima.	
Smicrips cretacea	Sp. nov	Valid	Cai & Huang	Late Cretaceous (Cenomanian)	Burmese amber	Myanmar	A member of Smicripidae. Originally described as a species of Smicrips; Kirejtshuk (2017) made it the type species of a separate genus Mesosmicrips.	
Stegocoleus	Gen. et sp. nov	Valid	Jarzembowski & Wang	Late Cretaceous (Cenomanian)	Burmese amber	Myanmar	An archostematan beetle, possibly a member of Cupedidae. The type species is Stegocoleus caii.	
Stenichnus proavus	Sp. nov	Valid	Jałoszyński & Perkovsky	Late Eocene	Rovno amber	Ukraine	A scydmaenine rove beetle belonging to the tribe Glandulariini.	
Sucinoptinus brevipennis	Sp. nov	Valid	Bellés & Perkovsky	Late Eocene		Ukraine	A spider beetle found in Rovno amber, a species of Sucinoptinus.	
Sucinoptinus rovnoensis	Sp. nov	Valid	Bellés & Perkovsky	Late Eocene		Ukraine	A spider beetle found in Rovno amber, a species of Sucinoptinus.	
Taxopsis	Gen. et comb. nov	Valid	Kirejtshuk, Nel, & Kirejtshuk	Eocene (Bartonian/Priabonian)	Baltic amber	Russia (Kaliningrad Oblast)	A reticulated beetle. The type species is "Cupes" motschulskyi Kirejtshuk (2005).	
Thescelostrophus	Gen. et sp. nov	Valid	Yu et al.	Late Cretaceous (Cenomanian)	Burmese amber	Myanmar	A member of Tetratomidae belonging to the tribe Eustrophini. The type species is T. cretaceus.	
Toxonotus comatus	Sp. nov	Valid	Poinar & Legalov	Eocene or Miocene	Dominican amber	Dominican Republic	A member of Anthribidae belonging to the subfamily Anthribinae and the tribe Platystomini, a species of Toxonotus.	
Trechus eoanophthalmus	Sp. nov	Valid	Schmidt, Hoffmann & Michalik	Eocene	Baltic amber	Europe (Baltic Sea coast)	A species of Trechus.	
Trechus exhibitorius	Sp. nov	Valid	Schmidt, Belousov & Michalik	Eocene	Baltic amber	Europe (Baltic Sea coast)	A species of Trechus.	
Tytthonyx geiseri	Sp. nov	Valid	Poinar & Fanti	Eocene or Miocene	Dominican amber	Dominican Republic	A soldier beetle, a species of Tytthonyx.	
Vertheia	Gen. et sp. nov	Valid	Jałoszyński & Perkovsky	Late Eocene	Rovno amber	Ukraine	A scydmaenine rove beetle belonging to the tribe Eutheiini. The type species is V. quadrisetosa.	
Vetuproteinus	Gen. et sp. nov	Valid	Cai et al.	Cretaceous	Burmese amber	Myanmar	A rove beetle belonging to the subfamily Proteininae. The type species is V. cretaceus	
Wangweiella	Gen. et sp. nov	Valid	Kolibáč & Huang	Middle Jurassic (Callovian)		China	A member of Cleridae. Genus includes new species W. calloviana.	
Warnis	Gen. et sp. nov	Valid	Lyubarsky, Perkovsky & Alekseev	Late Eocene	Baltic amber	Europe (Baltic Sea coast)	A member of Erotylidae belonging to the subfamily Xenoscelinae. Genus includes new species W. tvanksticus.	
Wongaroo	Gen. et sp. nov	Valid	Oberprieler et al.	Late Jurassic	Talbragar Fish Bed	Australia	A member of Cerophytidae. The type species is W. amplipectorale.	
Xestipyge ikanti	Sp. nov	Valid	Alekseev	Eocene	Baltic amber	Russia (Kaliningrad Oblast)	A member of Histeridae.	
Xylolaemus legalovi	Sp. nov	Valid	Alekseev & Bukejs	Eocene	Baltic amber	Europe (Baltic Sea coast)	A member of Zopheridae.	
Xylolaemus richardklebsi	Sp. nov	Valid	Alekseev & Bukejs	Eocene	Baltic amber	Europe (Baltic Sea coast)	A member of Zopheridae.	
Yantaroxenos	Gen. et sp. nov	Valid	Nabozhenko, Kirejtshuk & Merkl	Eocene	Baltic amber	Europe (Baltic Sea coast)	A darkling beetle belonging to the subfamily Lagriinae and probably to the tribe Belopini. The type species is Y. colydioides.	

=== Dermaptera ===
Name	Novelty	Status	Authors	Age	Unit	Location	Notes	Images
Abrderma	Gen. et sp. nov	Valid	Xing et al.	Middle Jurassic	Jiulongshan Formation	China	An earwig belonging to the family Protodiplatyidae. The type species is A. gracilentum.	
Barbderma	Gen. et sp. nov	Valid	Xing et al.	Early Cretaceous	Yixian Formation	China	An earwig belonging to the family Protodiplatyidae. The type species is Barbderma oblonguata.	
Perissoderma	Gen. et sp. nov	Valid	Xing et al.	Middle Jurassic	Jiulongshan Formation	China	An earwig belonging to the family Protodiplatyidae. The type species is P. triangulum.	
Sinoprotodiplatys ellipsoideuata	Sp. nov	Valid	Xing et al.	Early Cretaceous	Yixian Formation	China	An earwig belonging to the family Protodiplatyidae, a species of Sinoprotodiplatys.	

=== Dictyoptera ===
Name	Novelty	Status	Authors	Age	Unit	Location	Notes	Images
Alienopterus	Gen. et sp. nov	Valid	Bai, Beutel, Klass, Wipfler & Zhang in Delclòs et al.	Late Cretaceous (Cenomanian)	Burmese amber	Myanmar	A probable relative of the mantises. The type species is Alienopterus brachyelytrus.	
Aragonimantis	Gen. et sp. nov	Valid	Delclòs et al.	Early Cretaceous (Albian)		Spain	A mantis of uncertain phylogenetic placement. The type species is Aragonimantis aenigma.	
Burmantis zherikhini	Sp. nov	Valid	Delclòs et al.	Cretaceous (Albian–Cenomanian)		Myanmar	A mantis, a species of Burmantis.	
Diploptera gemini	Sp. nov	Valid	Barna in Vršanský et al.	Eocene	Green River Formation	United States	A cockroach, a species of Diploptera.	
Diploptera savba	Sp. nov	Valid	Šmídová in Vršanský et al.	Eocene	Green River Formation	United States	A cockroach, a species of Diploptera.	
Diploptera vladimir	Sp. nov	Valid	Vršanský in Vršanský et al.	Eocene	Green River Formation	United States	A cockroach, a species of Diploptera.	
Elisama hindwingnii	Sp. nov	Valid	Lee	Early Cretaceous (Aptian)	Crato Formation	Brazil	A cockroach belonging to the superfamily Corydioidea and the family Blattulidae.	
Ginormotermes	Gen. et sp. nov	Valid	Engel, Barden & Grimaldi	Cenomanian	Burmese amber	Myanmar	A termite. The type species is Ginormotermes rex (formerly Gigantotermes rex). The original generic name was preoccupied by Gigantotermes Haase (1890).	
Krishnatermes	Gen. et sp. nov	Valid	Engel, Barden & Grimaldi in Engel et al.	Cretaceous (ca. 100 mya)	Burmese amber	Myanmar	A termite. The type species is Krishnatermes yoddha.	
Mastotermes aethiopicus	Sp. nov	Valid	Engel, Currano & Jacobs	Early Miocene		Ethiopia	A termite, a species of Mastotermes.	
Ocelloblattula santanensis	Sp. nov	Valid	Lee	Early Cretaceous (Aptian)	Crato Formation	Brazil	A cockroach belonging to the superfamily Corydioidea and the family Blattulidae.	
Otagotermes	Gen. et sp. nov	Valid	Engel & Kaulfuss	Early Miocene	Foulden Maar fossil lagerstätte	New Zealand	A termite. The type species is O. novazealandicus.	
Perlucipecta santanensis	Sp. nov	Valid	Lee	Early Cretaceous (Aptian)	Crato Formation	Brazil	A cockroach belonging to the superfamily Blattoidea and the family Mesoblattinidae.	
Piniblattella magna	Sp. nov	Valid	Lee	Early Cretaceous (Aptian)	Crato Formation	Brazil	A cockroach belonging to the superfamily Blattoidea and the family Ectobiidae.	
Pterotermopsis	Gen. et sp. nov	Valid	Engel & Kaulfuss	Early Miocene	Foulden Maar fossil lagerstätte	New Zealand	A termite. The type species is P. fouldenica.	
Taieritermes	Gen. et sp. nov	Valid	Engel & Kaulfuss	Early Miocene	Foulden Maar fossil lagerstätte	New Zealand	A termite. The type species is T. krishnai.	
Umenopterix	Gen. et comb. nov	Valid	Lee	Early Cretaceous (Aptian)	Crato Formation	Brazil	A cockroach belonging to the family Umenocoleidae; a new genus for "Ponopterix" burkhardi Nel, Prokop & Kirejtshuk (2014).	
Waipiatatermes	Gen. et sp. nov	Valid	Engel & Kaulfuss	Early Miocene	Foulden Maar fossil lagerstätte	New Zealand	A termite. The type species is W. matatoka.	

=== Diptera ===
Name	Novelty	Status	Authors	Age	Unit	Location	Notes	Images
Acartophthalmites clusioides	Sp. nov.	Valid	Roháček	Eocene	Baltic amber	Russia (Kaliningrad Oblast)	A member of Opomyzoidea belonging to the family Clusiomitidae. Originally described as a species of Acartophthalmites, but subsequently made the type species of the separate genus Clusiomites.	
Aenigmatias longicornis	Sp. nov	Valid	Brown	Eocene		Europe (Baltic Sea coast)	A member of Phoridae found in Baltic amber, a species of Aenigmatias.	
Aenigmatias nigeroticus	Sp. nov.	Valid	Brown	Eocene		Europe (Baltic Sea coast)	A member of Phoridae found in Baltic amber, a species of Aenigmatias.	
Aenigmatias primitivus	Sp. nov.	Valid	Brown	Eocene		Europe (Baltic Sea coast)	A member of Phoridae found in Baltic amber, a species of Aenigmatias.	
Amblypsilopus monicae	Sp. nov.	Valid	Bickel in Bickel & Solórzano Kraemer	Miocene		Mexico	A long-legged fly belonging to the subfamily Sciapodinae; a species of Amblypsilopus.	
Archosolva	Gen. et 2 sp. nov.	Valid	Grimaldi	Cretaceous (late Albian–early Cenomanian)	Burmese amber	Myanmar	A member of Xylomyidae. The type species is A. biceps; genus also includes A. sulcata.	
Atherhagiox	Gen. et 2 sp. nov.	Valid	Grimaldi	Cretaceous (late Albian–early Cenomanian)	Burmese amber	Myanmar	A member of Tabanomorpha of uncertain phylogenetic placement, probably a basal tabanomorph. Genus includes A. ambiguum and A. simulans	
Burmapsilocephala evocoa	Sp. nov.	Valid	Grimaldi	Cretaceous (late Albian–early Cenomanian)	Burmese amber	Myanmar	A member of Apsilocephalidae.	
Caputmunda	Gen. et sp. nov	Valid	Fedotova & Perkovsky	Late Cretaceous (Santonian)	Taimyr amber	Russia	A gall midge. Genus includes new species C. yantardakhica.	
Coramus	Gen. et sp. nov.	Valid	Skibińska	Eocene	Baltic amber	Europe (Baltic Sea coast)	A member of Tanyderidae. The type species is C. gedanensis.	
Corethrella rovnoensis	Sp. nov.	Valid	Baranov & Kvifte in Baranov, Kvifte & Perkovsky	Eocene		Ukraine	A species of Corethrella found in Rovno amber.	
Corethrella sontagae	Sp. nov.	Valid	Baranov & Kvifte in Baranov, Kvifte & Perkovsky	Eocene		Ukraine	A species of Corethrella found in Rovno amber.	
Corporesana	Gen. et sp. nov	Valid	Fedotova & Perkovsky	Late Cretaceous (Santonian)	Taimyr amber	Russia	A gall midge. Genus includes new species C. khatanga.	
Cratomyia mimetica	Sp. nov.	Valid	Grimaldi	Cretaceous (late Albian–early Cenomanian)	Burmese amber	Myanmar	A member of Stratiomyomorpha belonging to the family Zhangsolvidae.	
Cratotabanus asiaticus	Sp. nov.	Valid	Grimaldi	Cretaceous (late Albian–early Cenomanian)	Burmese amber	Myanmar	A horse-fly (Tabanidae).	
Cretahilarimorpha	Gen. et sp. nov.	Valid	Myskowiak, Azar & Nel	Early Cretaceous		Lebanon	A member of Hilarimorphidae. The type species is Cretahilarimorpha lebanensis.	
Cretasolva	Gen. et sp. nov.	Valid	Grimaldi	Cretaceous (late Albian–early Cenomanian)	Burmese amber	Myanmar	A member of Xylomyidae. The type species is C. burmitica.	
Cretomycophila	Gen. et sp. nov	Valid	Fedotova & Perkovsky	Late Cretaceous (Santonian)	Taimyr amber	Russia	A gall midge. Genus includes new species C. ekaterinae.	
Cretoperomyia	Gen. et sp. nov	Valid	Fedotova & Perkovsky	Late Cretaceous (Santonian)	Taimyr amber	Russia	A gall midge. Genus includes new species C. taimyrica.	
Dicranoptycha plicativa	Sp. nov.	Valid	Gao, Shih & Ren	Late Cretaceous (earliest Cenomanian)	Burmese amber	Myanmar	A member of Limoniidae, a species of Dicranoptycha.	
Dixella curvistyla	Sp. nov.	Valid	Greenwalt & Moulton	Eocene	Kishenehn Formation	United States	A member of Dixidae.	
Dixella eomarginata	Sp. nov.	Valid	Greenwalt & Moulton	Eocene	Kishenehn Formation	United States	A member of Dixidae.	
Dixella intacta	Sp. nov.	Valid	Greenwalt & Moulton	Eocene	Kishenehn Formation	United States	A member of Dixidae.	
Dixella spinilobata	Sp. nov.	Valid	Greenwalt & Moulton	Eocene	Kishenehn Formation	United States	A member of Dixidae.	
Ectrepesthoneura mikolajczyki	Sp. nov.	Valid	Klimont & Krzemińska	Late Eocene	Baltic amber	Europe (Baltic Sea coast)	A member of the family Mycetophilidae.	
Endymiomyia	Gen. et sp. nov.	Valid	Grimaldi	Cretaceous (late Albian–early Cenomanian)	Burmese amber	Myanmar	A member of Bombyliidae. The type species is E. quadra.	
Eoacridophagus	Gen. et sp. nov.	Valid	Myskowiak, Garrouste & Nel	Early Eocene		France	A member of Mythicomyiidae belonging to the subfamily Psiloderoidinae. The type species is E. azari.	
Eocenotrichia	Gen. et sp. nov.	Valid	Garrouste, Azar & Nel	Early Eocene		France	A member of Scenopinidae. The type species is Eocenotrichia magnifica.	
Eoptychoptera cantabrica	Sp. nov.	Valid	Lukashevich & Arillo	Early Cretaceous (Albian)		Spain	A member of Ptychopteridae, a species of Eoptychoptera.	
Estoperpetua	Gen. et sp. nov	Valid	Fedotova & Perkovsky	Eocene	Sakhalin amber	Russia	A gall midge. Genus includes new species E. sakhalinica.	
Eucaudomyia	Gen. et sp. nov.	Valid	Grimaldi	Cretaceous (late Albian–early Cenomanian)	Burmese amber	Myanmar	A non-empidoid orthorrhaphan fly of uncertain phylogenetic placement. The type species is E. longicerci.	
Galloatherix completus	Sp. nov.	Valid	Grimaldi	Cretaceous (late Albian–early Cenomanian)	Burmese amber	Myanmar	A member of Tabanomorpha of uncertain phylogenetic placement, probably a basal tabanomorph.	
Gedanohelea fushunensis	Sp. nov.	Valid	Stebner, Szadziewski & Wang	Early Eocene	Fushun amber	China	A member of Ceratopogonini.	
Gedanohelea liaoningensis	Sp. nov.	Valid	Stebner, Szadziewski & Wang	Early Eocene	Fushun amber	China	A member of Ceratopogonini.	
Gracilomyia	Gen. et sp. nov.	Valid	Grimaldi	Cretaceous (late Albian–early Cenomanian)	Burmese amber	Myanmar	A non-empidoid orthorrhaphan fly of uncertain phylogenetic placement. The type species is G. wit.	
Helius alavensis	Sp. nov.	Valid	Kania, Krzemiński & Arillo	Early Cretaceous (late Albian)		Spain	A species of Helius.	
Helius anetae	Sp. nov.	Valid	Kania & Kopeć in Kania et al.	Eocene	Baltic amber	Europe (Baltic Sea coast)	A species of Helius.	
Helius (Helius) neali	Sp. nov.	Valid	Kopeć, Kania & Krzemiński	Early Miocene	Dominican amber	Dominican Republic	A species of Helius.	
Helius (Helius) oosterbroeki	Sp. nov.	Valid	Kopeć, Kania & Krzemiński	Early Miocene	Dominican amber	Dominican Republic	A species of Helius.	
Hellichiella polessica	Sp. nov.	Valid	Perkovsky & Sukhomlin	Late Eocene	Rovno amber	Ukraine	A black fly (Simuliidae).	
Hilarimorphites cummingi	Sp. nov.	Valid	Grimaldi	Cretaceous (late Albian–early Cenomanian)	Burmese amber	Myanmar	A member of Apystomyiidae.	
Hirmoneura caudiprima	Sp. nov.	Valid	Grimaldi	Cretaceous (late Albian–early Cenomanian)	Burmese amber	Myanmar	A member of Nemestrinidae.	
Hirmoneura zigrasi	Sp. nov.	Valid	Grimaldi	Cretaceous (late Albian–early Cenomanian)	Burmese amber	Myanmar	A member of Nemestrinidae.	
Jurassinemestrinus eurema	Sp. nov.	Valid	Grimaldi	Cretaceous (late Albian–early Cenomanian)	Burmese amber	Myanmar	A member of Nemestrinoidea belonging to the family Rhagionemestriidae. Originally described as a species of Jurassinemestrinus; Zhang, Zhang & Wang (in press) transferred this species to the separate genus Cretinemestrimus.	
Lebanoleptis	Gen. et sp. nov.	Valid	Angelini, Azar & Nel	Early Cretaceous		Lebanon	A snipe fly. The type species is Lebanoleptis huangi.	
Mantohelea sinica	Sp. nov.	Valid	Stebner, Szadziewski & Wang	Early Eocene	Fushun amber	China	A member of Ceratopogonini.	
Medetera amissa	Sp. nov.	Valid	Bickel in Bickel & Solórzano Kraemer	Miocene		Mexico	A long-legged fly belonging to the subfamily Medeterinae; a species of Medetera.	
Medetera totolapa	Sp. nov.	Valid	Bickel in Bickel & Solórzano Kraemer	Miocene		Mexico	A long-legged fly belonging to the subfamily Medeterinae; a species of Medetera.	
Menssana	Gen. et sp. nov	Valid	Fedotova & Perkovsky	Late Cretaceous (Santonian)	Taimyr amber	Russia	A gall midge. Genus includes new species M. norilsk.	
Mesochria fani	Sp. nov.	Valid	Szadziewski & Szwedo in Szadziewski et al.	Early Eocene	Guchengzi Formation	China	A member of Anisopodidae, a species of Mesochria.	
Mesorhaga pseudolacrymans	Sp. nov.	Valid	Bickel in Bickel & Solórzano Kraemer	Miocene		Mexico	A long-legged fly belonging to the subfamily Sciapodinae; a species of Mesorhaga.	
Microphorites moravicus	Sp. nov.	Valid	Tkoč, Nel & Prokop	Paleocene to the middle Eocene	Študlov amber	Czech Republic	A member of Dolichopodidae, a species of Microphorites.	
Mysteromyia	Gen. et sp. nov.	Valid	Grimaldi	Cretaceous (late Albian–early Cenomanian)	Burmese amber	Myanmar	A non-empidoid orthorrhaphan fly of uncertain phylogenetic placement. The type species is M. plumosa.	
Nandeva pudens	Sp. nov.	Valid	Giłka et al.	Early Eocene	Fushun amber	China	A member of Chironomidae, possibly a member or a relative of Tanytarsini; a species of Nandeva.	
Narcissomyia	Gen. et sp. nov.	Valid	Grimaldi	Cretaceous (late Albian–early Cenomanian)	Burmese amber	Myanmar	A member of Stratiomyidae. The type species is N. bella.	
Nealimyia	Gen. et sp. nov.	Valid	Grimaldi	Cretaceous (late Albian–early Cenomanian)	Burmese amber	Myanmar	A member of Bombyliidae. The type species is N. evenhuisi.	
Neoparentia chiapensis	Sp. nov.	Valid	Bickel in Bickel & Solórzano Kraemer	Miocene		Mexico	A long-legged fly belonging to the subfamily Sympycninae; a species of Neoparentia.	
Normyia	Gen. et 3 sp. nov.	Valid	Grimaldi	Cretaceous (late Albian–early Cenomanian)	Burmese amber	Myanmar	A member of Stratiomyidae. The type species is N. woodleyi; genus also includes N. telescopica and N. longistyli.	
Palaeostrobliella	Gen. et sp. nov	Valid	Fedotova & Perkovsky	Late Cretaceous (Santonian)	Taimyr amber	Russia	A gall midge. Genus includes new species P. dmitrii.	
Palaepangonius glossa	Sp. nov.	Valid	Grimaldi	Cretaceous (late Albian–early Cenomanian)	Burmese amber	Myanmar	A member of Tabanomorpha of uncertain phylogenetic placement, probably a basal tabanomorph.	
Peloropeodes paleomexicana	Sp. nov.	Valid	Bickel in Bickel & Solórzano Kraemer	Miocene		Mexico	A long-legged fly belonging to the subfamily Peloropeodinae; a species of Peloropeodes.	
Pioneeria	Gen. et sp. nov.	Valid	Grimaldi	Cretaceous (late Albian–early Cenomanian)	Burmese amber	Myanmar	A member of Bombyliidae. The type species is P. bombylia.	
Procrocidium	Gen. et sp. nov.	Valid	Grimaldi	Cretaceous (late Albian–early Cenomanian)	Burmese amber	Myanmar	A member of Bombyliidae. The type species is P. minutum.	
Protoculicoides hispanicus	Sp. nov.	Valid	Szadziewski & Arillo in Szadziewski et al.	Early Cretaceous (Albian)		Spain	A biting midge. Originally described as a species of Protoculicoides; Borkent (2019) transferred this species to the genus Atriculicoides.	
Protoculicoides sanjusti	Sp. nov.	Valid	Szadziewski & Arillo in Szadziewski et al.	Early Cretaceous (Albian)		Spain	A biting midge. Originally described as a species of Protoculicoides; Borkent (2019) transferred this species to the genus Atriculicoides.	
Psectrosciara fossilis	Sp. nov.	Valid	Nel & Coty	Late Oligocene-middle Miocene		Mexico	A member of Scatopsidae; a species of Psectrosciara.	
Pseudaenigmatias	Gen. et sp. nov.	Valid	Brown	Eocene		Europe (Baltic Sea coast)	A member of Phoridae found in Baltic amber. The type species is Pseudaenigmatias ctenitibia.	
Pseudorhagio	Gen. et sp. nov.	Valid	Zhang, Zhang & Wang	Late Cretaceous (Cenomanian)	Burmese amber	Myanmar	A member of Tabanomorpha of uncertain phylogenetic placement. The type species is P. zhangi.	
Rheotanytarsus hoffeinsorum	Sp. nov.	Valid	Giłka, Zakrzewska & Krzemiński in Zakrzewska, Krzemiński & Giłka	Eocene	Baltic amber	Europe (Gdańsk Bay coast)	A species of Rheotanytarsus.	
Rovnodiplosis	Gen. et sp. nov	Valid	Perkovsky & Fedotova	Late Eocene	Rovno amber	Ukraine	A gall midge. Genus includes new species R. eduardi.	
Simuliites yantardakh	Sp. nov	Valid	Perkovsky & Sukhomlin	Late Cretaceous	Taimyr amber	Russia	A black fly.	
Stempellinella fibra	Sp. nov.	Valid	Giłka, Zakrzewska & Krzemiński in Zakrzewska, Krzemiński & Giłka	Eocene	Baltic amber	Europe (Gdańsk Bay coast)	A species of Stempellinella.	
Symphoromyia eocenica	Sp. nov.	Valid	Nel, Perreau & Doitteau	Early Eocene	Oise amber	France	A species of Symphoromyia.	
Tabanipriscus	Gen. et sp. nov.	Valid	Grimaldi	Cretaceous (late Albian–early Cenomanian)	Burmese amber	Myanmar	A horse-fly (Tabanidae). The type species is T. transitivus.	
Tanytarsus crocota	Sp. nov.	Valid	Giłka, Zakrzewska & Krzemiński in Zakrzewska, Krzemiński & Giłka	Eocene	Baltic amber	Europe (Gdańsk Bay coast)	A species of Tanytarsus.	
Tethepomyia coxa	Sp. nov.	Valid	Grimaldi	Cretaceous (late Albian–early Cenomanian)	Burmese amber	Myanmar	A member of Archisargoidea belonging to the family Tethepomyiidae.	
Toxorhina (Ceratocheilus) mexicana	Sp. nov.	Valid	Kopeć, Kania & Krzemiński	Early Miocene		Mexico	A species of Toxorhina.	
Yantardakhiella	Gen. et sp. nov	Valid	Fedotova & Perkovsky	Late Cretaceous (Santonian)	Taimyr amber	Russia	A gall midge. Genus includes new species Y. pusilla.	
Zhenia	Gen. et sp. nov.	Valid	Zhang et al.	Late Cretaceous (Cenomanian)	Burmese amber	Myanmar	A member of Eremochaetidae. The type species is Zhenia xiai.	
Zherikhiniella	Gen. et sp. nov	Valid	Fedotova & Perkovsky	Late Cretaceous (Santonian)	Taimyr amber	Russia	A gall midge. Genus includes new species Z. pedicellata.	

=== Embioptera ===
Name	Novelty	Status	Authors	Age	Unit	Location	Notes	Images
Atmetoclothoda	Gen. et sp. nov	Valid	Engel & Huang in Engel et al.	Late Cretaceous (Cenomanian)	Burmese amber	Myanmar	A webspinner belonging to the family Clothodidae. The type species is Atmetoclothoda orthotenes.	
Litoclostes	Gen. et sp. nov	Valid	Engel & Huang in Engel et al.	Late Cretaceous (Cenomanian)	Burmese amber	Myanmar	A webspinner belonging to the family Oligotomidae. The type species is Litoclostes delicatus.	

=== Ephemeroptera ===
Name	Novelty	Status	Authors	Age	Unit	Location	Notes	Images
Maccaffertium annae	Sp. nov	Valid	Macadam & Ross	Miocene (Burdigalian)		Mexico	A mayfly belonging to the family Heptageniidae, a species of Maccaffertium.	
Siphloplecton gattolliati	Sp. nov	Valid	Staniczek & Godunko	Eocene		Europe (Baltic Sea coast)	A mayfly belonging to the family Metretopodidae found in Baltic amber, a species of Siphloplecton.	
Siphloplecton sartorii	Sp. nov	Valid	Staniczek & Godunko	Eocene		Europe (Baltic Sea coast)	A mayfly belonging to the family Metretopodidae found in Baltic amber, a species of Siphloplecton.	

=== Hemipterans ===
Name	Novelty	Status	Authors	Age	Unit	Location	Notes	Images
Alavametra	Gen. et sp. nov	Valid	Sánchez-García & Nel in Sánchez-García, Arillo & Nel	Early Cretaceous (late Albian)	Utrillas Group	Spain	A water measurer. The type species is Alavametra popovi.	
Alumeda solorzanokraemerae	Sp. nov	Valid	Popov	Miocene		Mexico	A thread-legged bug belonging to the tribe Ploiariolini; a species of Alumeda.	
Aradoleptus	Gen. et sp. nov	Valid	Heiss	Late Cretaceous (Cenomanian-Turonian)	Burmese amber	Myanmar	A member of Aradidae. The type species is A. birmanus.	
Aradus hoffmanni	Sp. nov	Valid	Heiss	Eocene	Baltic amber	Europe (Baltic Sea coast)	A member of Aradidae, a species of Aradus.	
Aradus stebnerae	Sp. nov	Valid	Heiss	Eocene	Baltic amber	Europe (Baltic Sea coast)	A member of Aradidae, a species of Aradus.	
Archearadus elongatus	Sp. nov	Valid	Heiss	Late Cretaceous (Cenomanian-Turonian)	Burmese amber	Myanmar	A member of Aradidae.	
Argentinoscytina	Gen. et sp. nov	Valid	Lara & Wang	Late Triassic (Carnian)	Potrerillos Formation	Argentina	A member of Scytinopteridae. The type species is Argentinoscytina clara.	
Bolbossus	Gen. et comb. et nom. nov	Valid	Gnezdilov & Bourgoin	Eocene	Baltic amber	Russia (Kaliningrad Oblast)	A member of Issidae. The type species is Issus bervoetsi Gnezdilov & Bourgoin (2016), which is a replacement name for the preoccupied Issus reticulatus Bervoets (1910).	
Calisiomorpha	Gen. et sp. nov	Valid	Heiss	Late Cretaceous (Cenomanian-Turonian)	Burmese amber	Myanmar	A member of Aradidae. The type species is C. yuripopovi.	
Calisiopsis azteca	Sp. nov	Valid	Heiss	Miocene		Mexico	A member of Aradidae belonging to the subfamily Calisiinae; a species of Calisiopsis.	
Changirostrus	Gen. et sp. nov	Valid	Du, Yao & Ren in Du et al.	Early Cretaceous	Yixian Formation	China	A member of Pentatomomorpha. The type species is C. maculatus.	
Chinchekoala	Gen. et sp. nov	Valid	Petrulevičius	Eocene (Ypresian)		Argentina	A member of Pentatomoidea. The type species is C. qunita.	
Crassiantenninus	Gen. et sp. nov	Valid	Du, Yao & Ren in Du et al.	Early Cretaceous	Yixian Formation	China	A member of Pentatomomorpha. The type species is C. minutus.	
Crassicerus limpiduspterus	Sp. nov	Valid	Tang, Yao & Ren	Early Cretaceous	Yixian Formation	China	A member of Cimicoidea belonging to the family Vetanthocoridae, a species of Crassicerus.	
Cylindrostethus gaudanti	Sp. nov	Valid	Hartung et al.	Paleocene		France	A member of Gerridae.	
Cysteochila copal	Sp. nov	Valid	Guilbert & Heiss	Uncertain (Pleistocene to sub-recent)	Madagascan Copal	Madagascar	A member of Tinginae, a species of Cysteochila.	
Daenerys	Gen. et sp. nov	Valid	Ryzhkova & Coram	Early Cretaceous		United Kingdom	A member of Archegocimicidae. The type species is Daenerys khaleesi.	
Dehiscensicoris	Gen. et sp. nov	Valid	Du, Yao & Ren in Du et al.	Early Cretaceous	Yixian Formation	China	A member of Pentatomomorpha. The type species is D. sanctus.	
Duraznoscarta	Gen. et sp. nov	Valid	Lara & Wang	Late Triassic (Carnian)	Potrerillos Formation	Argentina	A member of Eoscarterellidae. The type species is Duraznoscarta ramosa.	
Ellenbergeria	Gen. et sp. nov	Valid	Heiss	Late Cretaceous (Cenomanian-Turonian)	Burmese amber	Myanmar	A member of Aradidae. The type species is E. oviventris.	
Eoscartoides dmitryi	Sp. nov	Valid	Lambkin	Triassic		Australia	A member of Cicadomorpha belonging to the family Dysmorphoptilidae, a species of Eoscartoides.	
Gelastocoris curiosus	Sp. nov	Valid	Poinar & Brown	Late Cretaceous (Cenomanian)	Burmese amber	Myanmar	A toad bug, a species of Gelastocoris.	
Halonatusivena	Gen. et 2 sp. nov	Valid	Du, Yao & Ren	Early Cretaceous	Yixian Formation	China	A member of Pentatomomorpha belonging to the family Venicoridae. Genus includes H. shii and H. nervosus.	
Hirtaprosbole	Gen. et sp. nov	Valid	Liu et al.	Middle Jurassic	Jiulongshan Formation	China	A hairy cicada. The type species is Hirtaprosbole erromera.	
Koonwarraphis	Gen. et sp. nov	Valid	Martin, Skidmore & Stilwell	Early Cretaceous	Koonwarra Fossil Bed	Australia	A member of Tajmyraphidoidea. The type species is K. rotundafrons	
Leptosaldinea	Gen. et sp. nov	Valid	Popov & Heiss	Cretaceous (Albian-Cenomanian)	Burmese amber	Myanmar	A heteropteran of uncertain affinities; originally described as a member of Leptopodomorpha belonging to the family Leptopodidae, but subsequently argued to be a member of the family Schizopteridae. The type species is L. cobbeni.	
Macrotettigarcta	Gen. et sp. nov	Valid	Chen & Wang	Middle-Late Jurassic	Daohugou Beds	China	A hairy cicada. The type species is M. obesa.	
Maculaprosbole	Gen. et sp. nov	Valid	Zheng, Chen & Wang	Middle Jurassic	Daohugou Beds	China	A member of Tettigarctidae belonging to the subfamily Cicadoprosbolinae. The type species is M. zhengi.	
Mesoscytina fistulae	Sp. nov	Valid	Lambkin	Triassic		Australia	A member of Scytinopteridae.	
Mesoscytina magna	Sp. nov	Valid	Lambkin	Triassic		Australia	A member of Scytinopteridae.	
Mesoscytina woodsi	Sp. nov	Valid	Lambkin	Triassic		Australia	A member of Scytinopteridae.	
Minuticoris	Gen. et sp. nov	Valid	Du, Yao & Ren in Du et al.	Early Cretaceous	Yixian Formation	China	A member of Pentatomomorpha. The type species is M. brunneus.	
Mortalia	Gen. et sp. nov	Valid	Ryzhkova & Coram	Early Cretaceous		United Kingdom	A member of Archegocimicidae. The type species is Mortalia martini.	
Nerthra bichelata	Sp. nov	Valid	Poinar & Brown	Late Cretaceous (Cenomanian)	Burmese amber	Myanmar	A toad bug, a species of Nerthra.	
Phatnoma madagascariensis	Sp. nov	Valid	Guilbert & Heiss	Uncertain (Pleistocene to sub-recent)	Madagascan Copal	Madagascar	A member of Tingidae belonging to the subfamily Phatnominae, a species of Phatnoma.	
Pingquanicoris	Gen. et sp. nov	Valid	Du, Yao & Ren in Du et al.	Early Cretaceous	Yixian Formation	China	A member of Pentatomomorpha. The type species is P. punctatus.	
Protophyllotingis	Gen. et sp. nov	Valid	Heiss	Early Cretaceous	Crato Formation	Brazil	A member of Aradidae belonging to the subfamily Mezirinae. Genus includes new species is P. magna.	
Punctivetanthocoris	Gen. et sp. nov	Valid	Tang, Yao & Ren	Early Cretaceous	Yixian Formation	China	A member of Cimicoidea belonging to the family Vetanthocoridae. The type species is P. pubens.	
Quilnus rectinotus	Sp. nov	Valid	Heiss	Eocene	Baltic amber	Europe (Baltic Sea coast)	A member of Aradidae.	
Sanmai	Gen. et 3 sp. nov	Valid	Chen, Zhang & Wang in Chen et al.	Late Middle–early Late Jurassic	Daohugou Beds	China	A member of Tettigarctidae. The type species is S. kongi; genus also includes S. mengi and S. xuni.	Sanmai kongi
Sinopalaeocossus amoenus	Sp. nov	Valid	Chen, Zhang & Wang in Chen et al.	Middle Jurassic	Daohugou Beds	China	A member of Palaeontinidae, a species of Sinopalaeocossus.	
Snotra	Gen. et sp. nov	Valid	Szwedo & Drohojowska	Eocene (Lutetian)		Poland	A whitefly found in Baltic amber. The type species is Snotra christelae.	
Stannis	Gen. et sp. nov	Valid	Ryzhkova & Coram	Early Cretaceous		United Kingdom	A member of Archegocimicidae. The type species is Stannis baratheon.	
Taimyrocoris	Gen. et sp. nov	Valid	Popov	Late Cretaceous (Santonian)	Taimyr amber	Russia	A member of Cimicomorpha. The type species is T. sukatshevae.	
Tuthillia danielburckhardti	Sp. nov	Valid	Drohojowska, Węgierek & Solórzano Kraemer	Miocene		Mexico	A member of Psylloidea, a species of Tuthillia.	
Tyrion	Gen. et 2 sp. nov	Valid	Ryzhkova & Coram	Early Cretaceous		United Kingdom	A member of Archegocimicidae. Genus includes Tyrion lannister and Tyrion cersei.	

=== Hymenopterans ===
Name	Novelty	Status	Authorship of new name	Age	Unit	Location	Notes	Images
Abropelecinus tytthus	Sp. nov	Valid	Guo et al.	Late Cretaceous (Cenomanian)	Burmese amber	Myanmar	A member of Pelecinidae.	
Aethotoma	Gen. et sp. nov	Valid	Gao et al.	Middle Jurassic (Bathonian-Callovian)	Jiulongshan Formation	China	A member of Tenthredinoidea belonging to the family Xyelotomidae. The type species is A. aninomorpha.	
Amboserphus	Gen. et 3 sp. nov	Valid	Li et al.	Early Cretaceous	Yixian Formation	China	A member of Proctotrupoidea belonging to the family Mesoserphidae. The type species is A. tumidus; genus also includes new species A. beipiaoensis and A. dimidius.	
Anoplius planeta	Sp. nov	Valid	Rodriguez & Pitts in Rodriguez et al.	Early Miocene		Dominican Republic	A pompiline spider wasp found in Dominican amber, a species of Anoplius.	
Aphaenogaster dlusskyana	Sp. nov	Valid	Radchenko & Perkovsky	Middle Eocene	Sakhalin amber	Russia	An ant, a species of Aphaenogaster.	Aphaenogaster dlusskyana
Apiciserphus	Gen. et sp. nov	Valid	Li et al.	Middle Jurassic	Jiulongshan Formation	China	A member of Proctotrupoidea belonging to the family Mesoserphidae. The type species is A. augustus.	
Archaeorhyssalus	Gen. et sp. nov	Valid	Engel in Engel & Wang	Late Cretaceous (Cenomanian)	Burmese amber	Myanmar	A member of Braconidae belonging to the subfamily Protorhyssalinae. The type species is Archaeorhyssalus subsolanus.	
Austroponera schneideri	Sp. nov	Valid	Kaulfuss & Dlussky	Early Miocene		New Zealand	An ant, a species of Austroponera.	
Basiserphus	Gen. et 2 sp. nov	Valid	Li et al.	Middle Jurassic to Early Cretaceous	Jiulongshan Formation; Yixian Formation	China	A member of Proctotrupoidea belonging to the family Mesoserphidae. The type species is B. loculatus; genus also includes new species B. longus.	
Brachypelecinus	Gen. et sp. nov	Valid	Guo et al.	Late Cretaceous (Cenomanian)	Burmese amber	Myanmar	A member of Pelecinidae. The type species is B. euthyntus.	
Brevilyda	Gen. et sp. nov	Valid	Wang & Rasnitsyn in Wang et al.	Middle Jurassic (late Callovian)	Jiulongshan Formation	China	A sawfly. The type species is Brevilyda provecta.	
Camelomecia	Gen. et sp. nov	Valid	Barden & Grimaldi	Cretaceous (ca. 99 mya)	Burmese amber	Myanmar	An ant. The type species is C. janovitzi.	Camelomecia janovitzi
Ceratomyrmex	Gen. et sp. nov	Valid	Perrichot, Wang & Engel	Cretaceous (ca. 99 mya)	Burmese amber	Myanmar	An ant belonging to the tribe Haidomyrmecini. The type species is C. ellenbergeri.	Ceratomyrmex ellenbergeri
Choriserphus	Gen. et 2 sp. nov	Valid	Li et al.	Middle Jurassic	Jiulongshan Formation	China	A member of Proctotrupoidea belonging to the family Mesoserphidae. The type species is C. bellus; genus also includes new species C. gigantus.	
Cursoribythus	Gen. et sp. nov	Valid	Cockx & McKellar	Late Cretaceous (Cenomanian)	Burmese amber	Myanmar	A member of Scolebythidae. The type species is C. silvestris.	
Cuspilongus ghilarovi	Subfamily et Comb. nov	Valid	(Rasnitsyn)	Cretaceous; Aptian	Bon-Tsagaan Formation	Mongolia	A cuspilongine cephid wasp. Moved from Mesocephus ghilarovi (1988); Genus moved to new subfamily Cuspilonginae	
Daohugoa rasnitsyni	Sp. nov	Valid	Ding & Zhang in Ding, Zhang & Zhang	Middle-Late Jurassic	Daohugou Beds	China	A sawfly belonging to the family Daohugoidae.	
Diorhyssalus	Gen. et comb. nov	Valid	Engel	Late Cretaceous (Campanian)		Canada	A member of Braconidae; a new genus for "Diospilus" allani Brues (1937).	
Eocenomyrma breviscapa	Sp. nov	Valid	Radchenko & Dlussky	Late Eocene	Rovno amber	Ukraine	A myrmecinae ant.	Eocenomyrma breviscapa
Eocenomyrma ukrainica	Sp. nov	Valid	Radchenko & Dlussky	Late Eocene	Rovno amber	Ukraine	A myrmecinae ant.	Eocenomyrma ukrainica
Gerontoformica contegus	Comb. nov	valid	(Barden & Grimaldi)	Earliest Cenomanian	Burmese amber	Myanmar	A stem group ant.	Gerontoformica contegus
Gerontoformica gracilis	Comb. nov	valid	(Barden & Grimaldi)	Earliest Cenomanian	Burmese amber	Myanmar	A stem group ant.	Gerontoformica gracilis
Gerontoformica magnus	Comb. nov	valid	(Barden & Grimaldi)	Earliest Cenomanian	Burmese amber	Myanmar	A stem group ant.	Gerontoformica magnus
Gerontoformica maraudera	Sp. nov	Valid	Barden & Grimaldi	Earliest Cenomanian	Burmese amber	Myanmar	A stem group ant. Originally described as a species of Gerontoformica, but subsequently transferred to the genus Myanmyrma by Boudinot, Perrichot & Chaul (2020).	Gerontoformica maraudera
Gerontoformica occidentalis	Comb. nov	valid	(Perrichot et al.)	Latest Albian - Earliest Cenomanian	Charentese amber	France	A stem group ant.	Gerontoformica occidentalis
Gerontoformica orientalis	Comb. nov	valid	(Engel & Grimaldi)	Earliest Cenomanian	Burmese amber	Myanmar	A stem group ant.	Gerontoformica orientalis
Gerontoformica pilosus	Comb. nov	valid	(Barden & Grimaldi)	Earliest Cenomanian	Burmese amber	Myanmar	A stem group ant.	Gerontoformica pilosus
Gerontoformica robustus	Comb. nov	valid	(Barden & Grimaldi)	Earliest Cenomanian	Burmese amber	Myanmar	A stem group ant.	Gerontoformica robustus
Gerontoformica rugosus	Comb. nov	valid	(Barden & Grimaldi)	Earliest Cenomanian	Burmese amber	Myanmar	A stem group ant.	Gerontoformica rugusus
Gerontoformica spiralis	Comb. nov	valid	(Barden & Grimaldi)	Earliest Cenomanian	Burmese amber	Myanmar	A stem group ant.	Gerontoformica spiralis
Gerontoformica subcuspis	Comb. nov	valid	(Barden & Grimaldi)	Earliest Cenomanian	Burmese amber	Myanmar	A stem group ant.	Gerontoformica subcuspis
Gerontoformica tendir	Comb. nov	valid	(Barden & Grimaldi)	Earliest Cenomanian	Burmese amber	Myanmar	A stem group ant.	Gerontoformica tendir
Holopsenella	Gen. et sp. nov	Valid	Engel, Ortega-Blanco & Azevedo	Early Cretaceous (Barremian)		Lebanon	A member of Bethylidae. The type species is Holopsenella primotica.	
Hypselogastrion	Gen. et sp. nov	Valid	Engel in Engel & Wang	Late Cretaceous (Cenomanian)	Burmese amber	Myanmar	A member of Gasteruptiidae. The type species is Hypselogastrion simplex.	
Iberomaimetsha pallida	Sp. nov	Valid	Perrichot & Perkovsky	Late Cretaceous (Santonian)	Taimyr amber	Russia	A member of Maimetshidae.	
Idarnes thanatos	Sp. nov	Valid	Farache et al.	Miocene	Dominican amber	Dominican Republic	A member of Agaonidae belonging to the subfamily Sycophaginae, a species of Idarnes.	
Jibaissodes bellus	Sp. nov	Valid	Gao et al.	Early Cretaceous	Yixian Formation	China	A member of Pamphilioidea belonging to the family Megalodontesidae.	
Karataoserphus adaequatus	Sp. nov	Valid	Li et al.	Middle Jurassic	Jiulongshan Formation	China	A member of Proctotrupoidea belonging to the family Mesoserphidae.	
Karataoserphus gracilentus	Sp. nov	Valid	Li et al.	Middle Jurassic	Jiulongshan Formation	China	A member of Proctotrupoidea belonging to the family Mesoserphidae.	
Lindocerus	Gen. et comb. nov	Valid	Antropov	Miocene	Dominican amber	Dominican Republic	A member of Crabronidae belonging to the tribe Crabronini; a new genus for "Lindenius" paleomystax Bennett & Engel (2006).	
Medilyda	Gen. et 2 sp. nov	Valid	Wang & Rasnitsyn in Wang et al.	Middle Jurassic (late Callovian)	Jiulongshan Formation	China	A sawfly. The type species is Medilyda procera; genus also contains Medilyda distorta.	
Melissotarsus ethiopiensis	Sp. nov	Valid	Coty, Lebon & Nel	Uncertain (probably Cenozoic)	Ethiopian amber	Ethiopia	An ant, a species of Melissotarsus.	
Mesocephus brachycerus	Sp. nov	Valid	Kopylov & Rasnitsyn	Late Cretaceous (Santonian-early Campanian)	Ola Formation	Russia	A member of Cephidae.	
Mesocephus leleji	Sp. nov	Valid	Kopylov & Rasnitsyn	Late Cretaceous (Santonian-early Campanian)	Ola Formation	Russia	A member of Cephidae.	
Mesoserphus venustus	Sp. nov	Valid	Li et al.	Middle Jurassic	Jiulongshan Formation	China	A member of Proctotrupoidea belonging to the family Mesoserphidae.	
Mymaropsis baabdaensis	Sp. nov	Valid	Krogmann et al.	Early Cretaceous		Lebanon	A member of Spathiopterygidae, a species of Mymaropsis.	
Myrmecorhynchus novaeseelandiae	Sp. nov	Valid	Kaulfuss & Dlussky	Early Miocene		New Zealand	An ant, a species of Myrmecorhynchus.	
Novserphus	Gen. et sp. nov	Valid	Li et al.	Middle Jurassic	Jiulongshan Formation	China	A member of Proctotrupoidea belonging to the family Mesoserphidae. The type species is N. ningchengensis.	
Nucifrangibulum	Gen. et sp. nov	Valid	Cockx, McKellar & Perrichot	Late Cretaceous (Cenomanian)		France	A chrysidoid wasp. The type species is N. carentonensis.	
Othniodellitha	Gen. et sp. nov	Valid	Engel & Huang in Engel et al.	Late Cretaceous (Cenomanian)	Burmese amber	Myanmar	A member of Evanioidea. The type species is Othniodellitha mantichora.	
Ozososerphus	Gen. et 3 sp. nov	Valid	Li et al.	Middle Jurassic	Jiulongshan Formation	China	A member of Proctotrupoidea belonging to the family Mesoserphidae. The type species is O. lepidus; genus also includes new species O. ovatus and O. cuboidus.	
Paleogenia	Gen et sp. nov	Valid	Waichert & Pitts in Rodriguez et al.	Late Eocene		Russia (Kaliningrad Oblast)	A pepsine spider wasp found in Baltic amber. The type species is Paleogenia wahisi.	
Paleoropronia	Gen. et sp. nov	Valid	Garrouste, Pouillon & Nel	Thanetian	Menat Formation	France	A Roproniidae wasp. The type species is P. salamonei.	Paleoropronia salamonei
Prolyda dimidia	Sp. nov	Valid	Wang et al.	Middle Jurassic (Bathonian-Callovian)	Jiulongshan Formation	China	A member of Pamphilioidea of uncertain phylogenetic placement, a species of Prolyda.	
Prolyda elegantula	Sp. nov	Valid	Wang et al.	Middle Jurassic (Bathonian-Callovian)	Jiulongshan Formation	China	A member of Pamphilioidea of uncertain phylogenetic placement, a species of Prolyda.	
Rhetinorhyssalus	Gen. et sp. nov	Valid	Engel	Late Cretaceous (Cenomanian)	Burmese amber	Myanmar	A member of Braconidae. The type species is Rhetinorhyssalus morticinus.	
Rhytidoponera gibsoni	Sp. nov	Valid	Kaulfuss & Dlussky	Early Miocene		New Zealand	An ant, a species of Rhytidoponera.	
Rhytidoponera waipiata	Sp. nov	Valid	Kaulfuss & Dlussky	Early Miocene		New Zealand	An ant, a species of Rhytidoponera.	
Shoushida infera	Sp. nov	Valid	Guo et al.	Early Cretaceous	Yixian Formation	China	A member of Pelecinidae, a species of Shoushida.	
Siccibythus	Gen. et sp. nov	Valid	Cockx & McKellar	Late Cretaceous (Cenomanian)	Burmese amber	Myanmar	A member of Scolebythidae. The type species is S. musculosus.	
Sinoserphus flexilis	Sp. nov	Valid	Li et al.	Middle Jurassic	Jiulongshan Formation	China	A member of Proctotrupoidea belonging to the family Mesoserphidae.	
Sinoserphus grossus	Sp. nov	Valid	Li et al.	Middle Jurassic	Jiulongshan Formation	China	A member of Proctotrupoidea belonging to the family Mesoserphidae.	
Sinoserphus petilus	Sp. nov	Valid	Li et al.	Middle Jurassic	Jiulongshan Formation	China	A member of Proctotrupoidea belonging to the family Mesoserphidae.	
Sphaerocleptes	Gen. et sp. nov	Valid	Cockx, McKellar & Perrichot	Late Cretaceous (Cenomanian)		France	A chrysidoid wasp. The type species is S. neraudeaui.	
Stelepelecinus	Gen. et sp. nov	Disputed	Guo et al.	Early Cretaceous	Yixian Formation	China	A member of Pelecinidae. The type species is Stelepelecinus longus. Chemyreva & Kolyada (2026) considered Stelepelecinus to be a junior synonym of the genus Eopelecinus, though the authors maintained S. longus as a distinct species within the latter genus.	
Stephanogaster rasnitsyni	Sp. nov	Valid	Ding & Zhang in Ding et al.	Middle-Late Jurassic	Daohugou Beds	China	A member of Stephanoidea belonging to the family Ephialtitidae.	
Strenolyda	Gen. et 2 sp. nov	Valid	Wang & Rasnitsyn in Wang et al.	Middle Jurassic (late Callovian)	Jiulongshan Formation	China	A sawfly. The type species is Strenolyda marginalis; genus also contains Strenolyda retrorsa.	
Syspastoxyela	Gen. et sp. nov	Valid	Engel & Huang in Engel et al.	Late Cretaceous (Cenomanian)	Burmese amber	Myanmar	A sawfly. The type species is Syspastoxyela rhaphidia.	
Tainopompilus	Gen et sp. nov	Valid	Rodriguez & Pitts in Rodriguez et al.	Early Miocene		Dominican Republic	A pompiline spider wasp found in Dominican amber. The type species is Tainopompilus argentum.	
Turgonaliscus	Gen. et comb. nov	Valid	Engel	Early Cretaceous (Barremian)		United Kingdom	A member of Maimetshidae; a new genus for "Turgonalus" cooperi Rasnitsyn & Jarzembowski in Rasnitsyn et al. (1998).	
Zophepyris	Gen. et comb. nov	Valid	Engel, Ortega-Blanco & Azevedo	Early Cretaceous (Albian)		Spain	A member of Bethylidae belonging to the subfamily Lancepyrinae. The type species is "Lancepyris" alavaensis Ortega-Blanco and Engel (2013).	
Zoropelecinus periosus	Sp. nov	Valid	Guo et al.	Late Cretaceous (Cenomanian)	Burmese amber	Myanmar	A member of Pelecinidae.	
Zorophratra	Gen. et sp. nov	Valid	Engel	Early Cretaceous (Barremian)		Lebanon	A member of Maimetshidae. The type species is Z. corynetes.	

=== Mecopterans ===
Name	Novelty	Status	Authors	Age	Unit	Location	Notes	Images
Burmomerope clara	Sp. nov	Valid	Zhao & Wang in Zhao et al.	Cretaceous	Burmese amber	Myanmar	A member of Meropeidae.	
Composibittacus	Gen. et 2 sp. nov	Valid	Liu et al.	Middle Jurassic (Callovian)	Jiulongshan Formation	China	A hangingfly. Genus includes C. bipunctatus and C. reticulatus.	
Englathauma	Gen. et 2 sp. nov	Valid	Novokshonov et al.	Early Cretaceous (Barremian)	Upper Weald Clay Formation	United Kingdom	A scorpionfly belonging to the family Englathaumatidae. Genus includes E. crabbi and E. mellishae.	
Itaphlebia amoena	Sp. nov	Valid	Cao et al.	Middle Jurassic	Jiulongshan Formation	China	A nannochoristid scorpionfly, a species of Itaphlebia.	
Itaphlebia longiovata	Sp. nov	Valid	Cao et al.	Middle Jurassic	Jiulongshan Formation	China	A nannochoristid scorpionfly, a species of Itaphlebia.	
Jurachorista	Gen. et sp. nov	Valid	Soszyńska-Maj et al.	Early Jurassic (Sinemurian)		United Kingdom	A member of Eomeropidae. The type species is Jurachorista bashkuevi.	
Lichnomesopsyche prochorista	Sp. nov	Valid	Lin et al.	Middle Jurassic (late Callovian)	Jiulongshan Formation	China	A member of Mesopsychidae, a species of Lichnomesopsyche.	
Orthobittacus maculosus	Sp. nov	Valid	Liu et al.	Middle Jurassic (Callovian)	Jiulongshan Formation	China	A hangingfly, a species of Orthobittacus.	
Tytthobittacus jarzembowski	Sp. nov	Valid	Kopeć et al.	Early Cretaceous	Purbeck Limestone Group	United Kingdom	A hangingfly, a species of Tytthobittacus.	
Vitimopsyche pectinella	Sp. nov	Valid	Gao et al.	Early Cretaceous	Yixian Formation	China	A member of Mesopsychidae, a species of Vitimopsyche.	
Vitimopsyche pristina	Sp. nov	Valid	Lin et al.	Middle Jurassic (late Callovian)	Jiulongshan Formation	China	A member of Mesopsychidae, a species of Vitimopsyche.	

=== Megalopterans ===
Name	Novelty	Status	Authors	Age	Unit	Location	Notes	Images
Cratocorydalopsis	Gen. et sp. nov	Valid	Jepson & Heads	Early Cretaceous	Crato Formation	Brazil	A member of Corydalidae. The type species is Cratocorydalopsis brasiliensis.	
Haplosialodes	Gen. et sp. nov	Valid	Huang et al.	Late Cretaceous (Cenomanian)	Burmese amber	Myanmar	An alderfly. The type species is Haplosialodes liui.	
Lithocorydalus	Gen. et sp. nov	Valid	Jepson & Heads	Early Cretaceous	Crato Formation	Brazil	A member of Corydalidae. The type species is Lithocorydalus fuscata.	

=== Neuropterans ===
Name	Novelty	Status	Authors	Age	Unit	Location	Notes	Images
Achlyoconis	Gen. et sp. nov	Valid	Engel	Late Cretaceous (Cenomanian)	Burmese amber	Myanmar	A member of Coniopterygidae belonging to the subfamily Aleuropteryginae and the tribe Fontenelleini. The type species is A. heptatrichia.	
Baisopardus escuilliei	Sp. nov	Valid	Myskowiak & Nel	Early Cretaceous	Crato Formation	Brazil	An antlion, a species of Baisopardus.	
Baisopardus pumilio	Sp. nov	Valid	Myskowiak & Nel	Early Cretaceous	Crato Formation	Brazil	An antlion, a species of Baisopardus.	
Balticoneurorthus	Gen. et sp. nov	Valid	Wichard	Eocene	Baltic amber	Europe (Baltic Sea coast)	A member of Nevrorthidae. The type species is B. elegans.	
Burmaleon	Gen. et sp. nov	Disputed	Myskowiak et al.	Cretaceous		Myanmar	An Osmylidae. The type species is B. magnificus. Winterton et al. (2019) considered the genus Burmaleon to be a junior synonym of the genus Nuddsia.	
Burmaneura	Gen. et sp. nov	Valid	Huang et al.	Late Cretaceous (Cenomanian)	Burmese amber	Myanmar	An antlion. The type species is B. minuta.	
Burmopsychops	Gen. et sp. nov	Valid	Lu, Zhang & Liu	Cretaceous (Albian-Cenomanian)	Burmese amber	Myanmar	A member of Psychopsoidea of uncertain phylogenetic placement, possibly a member of the family Kalligrammatidae. The type species is B. limoae.	Burmopsychops limoae
Cretodilar	Gen. et sp. nov	Valid	Liu & Zhang in Liu et al.	Cretaceous	Burmese amber	Myanmar	A pleasing lacewing. Genus includes new species C. burmanus.	
Dilar cretaceus	Sp. nov	Valid	Liu & Zhang in Liu et al.	Cretaceous	Burmese amber	Myanmar	A pleasing lacewing.	
Fiaponeura	Gen. et sp. nov	Valid	Lu, Zhang & Liu	Cretaceous (Albian-Cenomanian)	Burmese amber	Myanmar	A member of Psychopsoidea of uncertain phylogenetic placement. The type species is F. penghiani.	Fiaponeura penghiani
Guithone	Gen. et sp. nov	Valid	Zheng, Ren & Wang	Middle Jurassic	Jiulongshan Formation	China	A member of Ithonidae. The type species is G. bethouxi.	
Halteriomantispa	Gen. et sp. nov	Valid	Liu, Lu & Zhang	Cretaceous (Albian-Cenomanian)	Burmese amber	Myanmar	A member of Dipteromantispidae. The type species is H. grimaldii.	Halteriomantispa grimaldii
Lasiosmylus longus	Sp. nov	Valid	Zheng, Ren & Wang	Early Cretaceous (Barremian-early Aptian)	Yixian Formation	China	A member of Ithonidae.	
Maculaberotha	Gen. et sp. nov	Valid	Yuan, Ren & Wang	Late Cretaceous	Burmese amber	Myanmar	A member of Berothidae. The type species is M. nervosa.	
Magniberotha	Gen. et sp. nov	Valid	Yuan, Ren & Wang	Late Cretaceous	Burmese amber	Myanmar	A member of Berothidae. The type species is M. recurrens.	
Makarkinia kerneri	Sp. nov	Valid	Bechly & Makarkin	Early Cretaceous	Crato Formation	Brazil	A Kalligrammatid	
Megalopteroneura	Gen. et sp. nov	Valid	Liu, Lu & Zhang	Cretaceous (Albian-Cenomanian)	Burmese amber	Myanmar	A member of Corydasialidae (the family transferred by the authors of the description of Megalopteroneura from Megaloptera to Neuroptera). The type species is M. chenxingi.	
Palaeoneurorthus eocaenus	Sp. nov	Valid	Wichard	Eocene	Baltic amber	Europe (Baltic Sea coast)	A member of Nevrorthidae.	
Paleosisyra minor	Sp. nov	Valid	Wichard, Wedmann & Weiterschan	Eocene	Baltic amber	Europe (Baltic Sea coast)	A member of Sisyridae.	
Paradoxosisyra	Gen. et sp. nov	Valid	Makarkin	Late Cretaceous (early Cenomanian)	Burmese amber	Myanmar	A member of Sisyridae. The type species is Paradoxosisyra groehni.	
Paranimboa	Gen. et sp. nov	Valid	Engel	Late Cretaceous (Cenomanian)	Burmese amber	Myanmar	A member of Coniopterygidae belonging to the subfamily Coniopteryginae and the tribe Coniopterygini. The type species is P. litotes.	
Pedanoptera	Gen. et sp. nov	Valid	Liu et al.	Late Cretaceous (early Cenomanian)	Burmese amber	Myanmar	A member of Mesochrysopidae. The type species is P. arachnophila.	
Proberotha dichotoma	Sp. nov	Valid	Wichard	Eocene	Baltic amber	Europe (Baltic Sea coast)	A member of Nevrorthidae.	
Proneuronema	Gen. et 2 sp. et comb. nov	Valid	Makarkin, Wedmann & Weiterschan	Eocene	Baltic amber Klondike Mountain Formation	Europe; United States	A Hemerobiidae genus 2 new species P. gradatum & P. minor, plus "Cretomerobius" wehri Makarkin et al. (2003).	
Prosisyrina sphinga	Sp. nov	Valid	Makarkin & Perkovsky	Late Cretaceous (Santonian)	Taimyr amber	Russia	A member of Sisyridae, tentatively classified as a species of Prosisyrina.	
Rafaelnymphes	Gen. et sp. nov	Valid	Myskowiak et al.	Early Cretaceous	Crato Formation	Brazil	A split-footed lacewing. The type species is Rafaelnymphes cratoensis.	

=== Odonata ===
Name	Novelty	Status	Authors	Age	Unit	Location	Notes	Images
Aeshna zlatkokvaceki	Sp. nov	Valid	Prokop, Pecharová & Nel	Early Miocene		Czech Republic	A dragonfly, a species of Aeshna.	
Burmadysagrion	Gen. et sp. nov	Valid	Zheng, Wang & Nel in Zheng et al.	Late Cretaceous (Cenomanian)	Burmese amber	Myanmar	A damselfly belonging to the family Dysagrionidae. The type species is B. zhangi.	
Burmalindenia	Gen. et sp. nov	Valid	Schädel & Bechly	Late Cretaceous (Cenomanian)	Burmese amber	Myanmar	A dragonfly belonging to the family Gomphidae and the subfamily Lindeniinae. The type species is Burmalindenia imperfecta.	Burmalindenia imperfecta
Cretagomphaeschnaoides	Gen. et sp. nov	Valid	Zheng et al.	Late Cretaceous (Cenomanian)	Burmese amber	Myanmar	A dragonfly belonging to the family Gomphaeschnidae. The type species is C. jarzembowskae.	
Dorsettia sinica	Sp. nov	Valid	Zheng et al.	Early Jurassic	Badaowan Formation	China	A damsel-dragonfly.	
Liaostenophlebia	Gen. et sp. nov	Valid	Zheng et al.	Early Cretaceous	Yixian Formation	China	A member of Stenophlebiidae. Genus includes new species L. yixianensis.	
Mesosticta electronica	Sp. nov	Valid	Zheng et al.	Late Cretaceous (Cenomanian)	Burmese amber	Myanmar	A damselfly belonging to the family Platystictidae, a species of Mesosticta.	
Oligaeschna bulgariensis	Sp. nov	Valid	Nel et al.	Miocene		Bulgaria	A dragonfly belonging to the family Aeshnidae.	
Palaeoperilestes	Gen. et sp. nov	Valid	Zheng et al.	Late Cretaceous (Cenomanian)	Burmese amber	Myanmar	A member of Perilestidae. The type species is Palaeoperilestes electronicus.	
Primorilestes magnificus	Sp. nov	Valid	Nel et al.	Miocene		Bulgaria	A damselfly belonging to the family Dysagrionidae.	
Stenolestes rhodopensis	Sp. nov	Valid	Nel et al.	Miocene		Bulgaria	A member of the family Sieblosiidae.	
Stenophlebia liaoningensis	Sp. nov	Valid	Zheng et al.	Early Cretaceous (Aptian)	Yixian Formation	China	A member of Odonata belonging to the family Stenophlebiidae; a species of Stenophlebia.	
Valerea	Gen. et sp. nov	Valid	Garrouste et al.	Paleocene		France	A damselfly. The ype species is V. multicellulata.	

=== Raphidioptera ===
Name	Novelty	Status	Authors	Age	Unit	Location	Notes	Images
Burmoraphidia	Gen. et sp. nov	Valid	Liu, Lu & Zhang	Late Cretaceous (Cenomanian)	Burmese amber	Myanmar	A Mesoraphidiidae snakefly. The type species is B. reni.	Burmoraphidia reni
Dolichoraphidia	Gen. et 2 sp. nov	Valid	Liu, Lu & Zhang	Late Cretaceous (Cenomanian)	Burmese amber	Myanmar	A Mesoraphidiidae snakefly. The genus includes D. aspoecki and D. engeli.	Dolichoraphidia engeli
Rhynchoraphidia	Gen. et sp. nov	Valid	Liu, Lu & Zhang	Late Cretaceous (Cenomanian)	Burmese amber	Myanmar	A Mesoraphidiidae snakefly. The type species is R. burmana.	Rhynchoraphidia burmana

=== Strepsiptera ===
Name	Novelty	Status	Authors	Age	Unit	Location	Notes	Images
Caenocholax barkleyi	Sp. nov	Valid	Antell & Kathirithamby	Early Eocene	Green River Formation	United States	A member of Myrmecolacidae; a species of Caenocholax.	
Caenocholax palusaxus	Sp. nov	Valid	Antell & Kathirithamby	Early Eocene	Green River Formation	United States	A member of Myrmecolacidae; a species of Caenocholax.	
Kinzelbachilla	Gen. et sp. nov	Valid	Pohl & Beutel	Late Cretaceous (Cenomanian)	Burmese amber	Myanmar	A twisted-wing insect. The type species is Kinzelbachilla ellenbergeri.	
Kronomyrmecolax	Gen. et sp. nov	Valid	Wang, Kathirithamby & Engel	Early Eocene		China	A twisted-wing insect belonging to the family Myrmecolacidae. The type species is Kronomyrmecolax fushunicus.	
Phthanoxenos	Gen. et sp. nov	Valid	Engel & Huang in Engel et al.	Late Cretaceous (Cenomanian)	Burmese amber	Myanmar	A twisted-wing insect. The type species is Phthanoxenos nervosus.	

=== Trichoptera ===
Name	Novelty	Status	Authors	Age	Unit	Location	Notes	Images
Archaeoneureclipsis martynovi	Sp. nov	Valid	Melnitsky & Ivanov	Eocene	Rovno amber	Ukraine		
Archaeotinodes malickyi	Sp. nov	Valid	Melnitsky & Ivanov	Eocene	Rovno amber	Ukraine		
Baissophryganoides popovi	Sp. nov	Valid	Sukatsheva	Early Cretaceous		Mongolia	A caddisfly belonging to the family Phryganeidae.	
Cathayamodus	Gen. et sp. nov	Valid	Gao et al.	Early Cretaceous	Yixian Formation	China	A caddisfly belonging to the group Integripalpia. The type species is C. fournieri.	
Eotrichostegia	Gen. et sp. nov	Valid	Melnitsky & Ivanov	Eocene	Rovno amber	Ukraine	Genus includes new species E. retrograda.	
Erotesis bessylenon	Sp. nov	Valid	Melnitsky & Ivanov	Eocene	Rovno amber	Belarus		
Folindusia (Acrindusia) phryganoides	Sp. nov	Valid	Sukacheva	Paleocene		Russia	A caddisfly belonging to the family Phryganeidae described on the basis of larval cases.	
Neureclipsis burmanica	Sp. nov	Valid	Wichard & Wang	Late Cretaceous (Cenomanian)	Burmese amber	Myanmar	A tube maker caddisfly.	
Nyctiophylax leningrad	Sp. nov	Valid	Melnitsky & Ivanov	Eocene		Russia	A caddisfly belonging to the family Polycentropodidae found in Baltic amber; a species of Nyctiophylax.	
Orthotrichia umbra	Sp. nov	Valid	Melnitsky & Ivanov	Eocene	Rovno amber	Ukraine		
Oxyethira lurida	Sp. nov	Valid	Melnitsky & Ivanov	Eocene	Rovno amber	Ukraine		
Polycentropus grigorenkoi	Sp. nov	Valid	Melnitsky & Ivanov	Eocene	Rovno amber	Ukraine		
Proagrypnia	Gen. et sp. nov	Valid	Sukacheva	Late Jurassic-Early Cretaceous		Russia	A caddisfly belonging to the family Phryganeidae. Genus includes new species P. sinitsae.	
Wormaldia cretacea	Sp. nov	Valid	Wichard & Wang	Late Cretaceous (Cenomanian)		Myanmar	A caddisfly belonging to the family Philopotamidae; a species of Wormaldia.	
Wormaldia pobeda	Sp. nov	Valid	Melnitsky & Ivanov	Eocene		Ukraine	A caddisfly belonging to the family Philopotamidae found in Rovno amber; a species of Wormaldia.	
Wormaldia resina	Sp. nov	Valid	Wichard & Wang	Late Cretaceous (Cenomanian)	Burmese amber	Myanmar	A caddisfly belonging to the family Philopotamidae; a species of Wormaldia.	

=== Other insects ===
Name	Novelty	Status	Authors	Age	Unit	Location	Notes	Images
Araripegryllus romualdoi	Sp. nov	Disputed	Freitas, de Moura & Saraiva	Early Cretaceous	Romualdo Member of the Santana Formation	Brazil	A cricket. Heads (2018) considered this taxon to be a nomen dubium.	
Argentinala	Gen. et sp. nov	Valid	Petrulevičius & Gutiérrez	Carboniferous (Serpukhovian)	Guandacol Formation	Argentina	A member of Odonatoptera belonging to the order Argentinoptera. The type species is A. cristinae.	Argentinala cristinae
Burmopsylla	Gen. et sp. nov	Valid	Liang, Zhang & Liu	Late Cretaceous (early Cenomanian)	Burmese amber	Myanmar	A member of Paraneoptera belonging to the family Archipsyllidae. The type species is Burmopsylla maculata.	
Echinosomiscus	Gen. et sp. nov	Valid	Engel & Wang in Engel, Wang & Alqarni	Late Cretaceous (Cenomanian)	Burmese amber	Myanmar	A member of Phasmatidae sensu lato. The type species is Echinosomiscus primoticus.	
Embidopsocus pankowskiorum	Sp. nov	Valid	Engel	Eocene (Lutetian)		Europe (Baltic Sea coast)	A booklouse belonging to the family Liposcelididae and the subfamily Embidopsocinae found in Baltic amber, a species of Embidopsocus.	
Eotriplocania	Gen. et sp. nov	Valid	Zhang et al.	Eocene		China	A member of Psocodea belonging to the family Ptiloneuridae. The type species is Eotriplocania sinica.	
Hypopsylla	Gen. et sp. nov	Valid	Prokop, Garrouste & Nel	Late Permian		Australia	A member of Permopsocida belonging to the family Psocidiidae. The type species is H. belmontensis.	
Kirchnerala	Gen. et sp. nov	Valid	Petrulevičius & Gutiérrez	Carboniferous (Serpukhovian)	Guandacol Formation	Argentina	A member of Odonatoptera belonging to the order Kukaloptera. The type species is K. treintamil.	Kirchnerala treintamil
Locustopsis rhytofemoralis	Sp. nov	Valid	Gu et al.	Jurassic	Jiulongshan Formation	China	A grasshopper.	
Mesoptilus carpenteri	Sp. nov	Valid	Guan et al.	Permian (Artinskian)	Wellington Formation	United States	A member of Anthracoptilidae (a group of insects of uncertain phylogenetic placement, possibly related to dictyopterans), a species of Mesoptilus.	
Mydiognathus	Gen. et sp. nov	Valid	Yoshizawa & Lienhard	Late Cretaceous (early Cenomanian)		Myanmar	A member of Paraneoptera belonging to the family Archipsyllidae (a relative of hemipterans and thrips). The type species is Mydiognathus eviohlhoffae.	
Paraelectrentomopsis	Gen. et sp. nov	Valid	Azar, Hakim & Huang	Late Cretaceous (Cenomanian)	Burmese amber	Myanmar	A member of Psocodea belonging to the family Compsocidae. The type species is P. chenyangcaii.	
Permotettigonia	Gen. et sp. nov	Valid	Nel & Garrouste in Garrouste et al.	Permian (Roadian)	Cians Formation	France	An orthopteran belonging to the superfamily Tettigonioidea. The type species is P. gallica.	
Protocoeliades	Gen. et sp. nov	Valid	De Jong	Early Eocene		Denmark	A skipper butterfly. The type species is P. kristenseni.	
Protomiamia	Gen. et sp. nov	Valid	Du et al.	Carboniferous (early Pennsylvanian)		China	A stem-orthopteran. The type species is Protomiamia yangi.	
Pseudomesoptilus	Gen. et comb. nov	Valid	Guan et al.	Late Carboniferous (Gzhelian)		France	A member of Anthracoptilidae (a group of insects of uncertain phylogenetic placement, possibly related to dictyopterans); a new genus for "Mesoptilus" sellardsi Lameere (1917).	
Psocorrhyncha	Gen. et sp. nov	Valid	Huang et al.	Late Cretaceous (earliest Cenomanian)		Myanmar	A member of Permopsocida (an extinct group of insects related to hemipterans and thrips) belonging to the family Archipsyllidae. The type species is Psocorrhyncha burmitica.	
Pteroliriope	Gen. et sp. nov	Valid	Cui et al.	Middle Jurassic	Jiulongshan Formation	China	A salmonfly. The type species is P. sinitshenkovae.	
Sinopsyllipsocus	Gen. et sp. nov	Valid	Zhang et al.	Eocene		China	A member of Psocodea belonging to the family Psyllipsocidae. The type species is Sinopsyllipsocus fushunensis.	
Srokalarva	Gen. et sp. nov	Valid	Haug et al.	Carboniferous (Moscovian)	Carbondale Formation	United States	A member of Holometabola of uncertain phylogenetic placement. The type species is Srokalarva berthei.	Srokalarva berthei
Strephocladus permianus	Sp. nov	Valid	Guan et al.	Permian (Guadalupian)	Salagou Formation	France	A member of Anthracoptilidae (a group of insects of uncertain phylogenetic placement, possibly related to dictyopterans), a species of Strephocladus.	
Sylvalitoralis cheni	Sp. nov	Valid	Zhang, Bai & Yang in Zhang et al.	Late Cretaceous (early Cenomanian)	Burmese amber	Myanmar	A relative of the ice crawlers.	
Tupacsala	Gen. et sp. nov	Valid	Petrulevičius & Gutiérrez	Carboniferous (Serpukhovian)	Guandacol Formation	Argentina	A member of Odonatoptera belonging to the order Eugeroptera. The type species is T. niunamenos.	
Westphaloptilus	Gen. et sp. nov	Valid	Guan et al.	Carboniferous (Bashkirian)		France	A member of Anthracoptilidae (a group of insects of uncertain phylogenetic placement, possibly related to dictyopterans). The type species is Westphaloptilus gallicus.	

== Research ==
- A study on the recovery of insect herbivores after the Cretaceous–Paleogene extinction event as indicated by insect-feeding damage on fossil leaves from the Maastrichtian and Danian localities in Patagonia (Argentina) is published by Donovan et al. (2016).
- A study of the morphology of the surface microstructure of the wings, head and abdomen of the Carboniferous megasecopteran Brodioptera sinensis is published by Prokop, Pecharová & Ren (2016).
- A study on the anatomy of the respiratory and alimentary systems of Saurophthirus longipes is published by Strelnikova & Rasnitsyn (2016).
- New anatomical data on the fossil beetle Onthophilus intermedius, obtained by using X-ray computed tomography, is published by Schwermann et al. (2016).
- Setae comparable with setae of extant dermestid beetle larvae are described from the Cretaceous Burmese amber by Poinar & Poinar (2016).
- A second specimen of the Cretaceous mosquito Burmaculex antiquus is described by Borkent & Grimaldi (2016).
- A study of well-preserved kalligrammatid fossils from Middle Jurassic and Early Cretaceous sites in northeastern China, indicating that kalligrammatids convergently evolved some of the anatomical traits also present in butterflies, is published by Labandeira et al. (2016).
- Fossilized termite nests with preserved fungus gardens within them are described from the Oligocene Songwe Member of the Nsungwe Formation in the Rukwa Rift Basin (Tanzania) by Roberts et al. (2016).
- Chrysopoid larvae, myrmeleontoid (owlfly and nymphid) larvae and reduviid nymphs preserved carrying debris for camouflage are described from the Cretaceous Burmese, French and Lebanese ambers by Wang et al. (2016).
- A fossilized bee nest is described from the Buxton-Norlim Limeworks in South Africa by Parker, Hopley & Kuhn (2016).
