= Eugonus bicolor =

Scientific classification
- Domain: Eukaryota
- Kingdom: Animalia
- Phylum: Arthropoda
- Class: Insecta
- Order: Coleoptera
- Suborder: Polyphaga
- Infraorder: Cucujiformia
- Family: Anthribidae
- Genus: Eugonus
- Species: E. bicolor

Binomial name
- Eugonus bicolor Valentine, 1972

Species of beetle

Eugonus bicolor is a species of fungus weevil in the beetle family Anthribidae. It is found in Central America and North America.
