= Englathauma =

Englathauma Temporal range: Barremian

Scientific classification
- Kingdom: Animalia
- Phylum: Arthropoda
- Clade: Pancrustacea
- Class: Insecta
- Order: Mecoptera
- Family: †Englathaumatidae; Novokshonov et al, 2016
- Genus: †Englathauma; Novokshonov et al, 2016

Species
- †Englathauma crabbi Novokshonov et al, 2016; †Englathauma mellishae Novokshonov et al, 2016

Extinct genus of scorpionflies

Englathauma is an extinct genus of scorpionfly. It is the only member of the family Englathaumatidae. It is known from two species, E. crabbi, and E. mellishae. Both species are known from the Weald Clay of the United Kingdom, dating to the Barremian stage of the Early Cretaceous. The family had been a nomen nudum since the death of the lead author of the paper Victor G. Novokshonov, in 2003, until the paper was published in 2016. The well sclerotized wings suggest that they were used as cover to protect the body rather than for flight, similar to the living Notiothauma.
