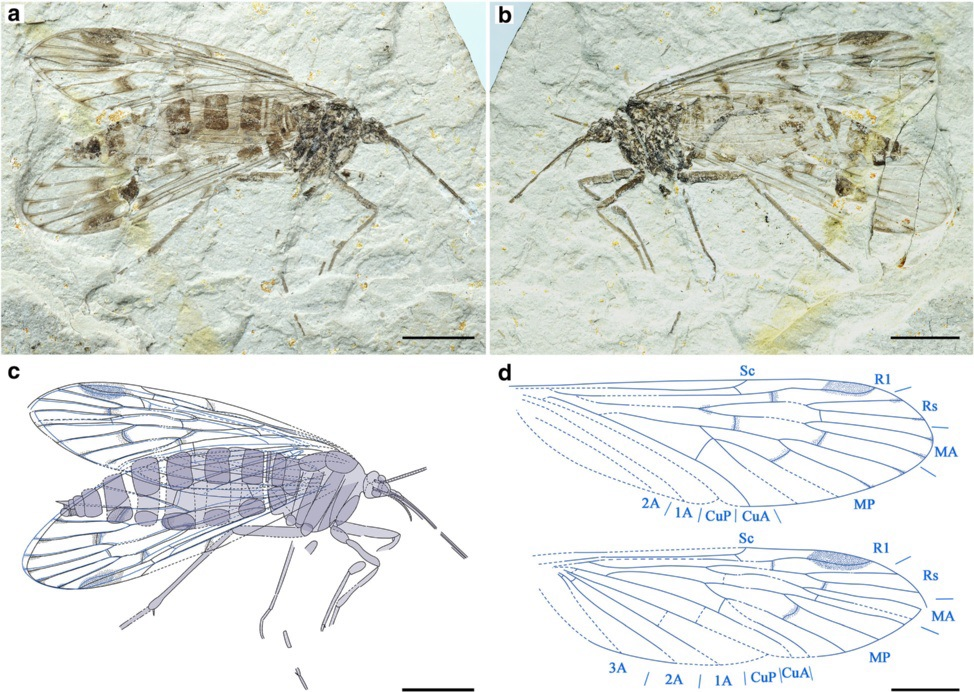
- Lichnomesopsyche daohugouensis

Scientific classification
- Domain: Eukaryota
- Kingdom: Animalia
- Phylum: Arthropoda
- Class: Insecta
- Order: Mecoptera
- Family: †Mesopsychidae
- Genus: †Lichnomesopsyche; Ren et al., 2010

Species
- L. gloriae Ren et al., 2010; L. daohugouensis Ren et al., 2010; L. prochorista Lin et al, 2016

= Lichnomesopsyche =

Lichnomesopsyche Temporal range: Callovian

Extinct genus of insects

Lichnomesopsyche is an extinct genus of mesopsychid mecopteran which existed in what is now China during the middle Jurassic period. It was found in the Daohugou Bed. It was named by Ren Dong, Conrad C. Labandeira and Shih ChungKun in 2010. Three species have been named, which can be distinguished by their differing male genitalia.
