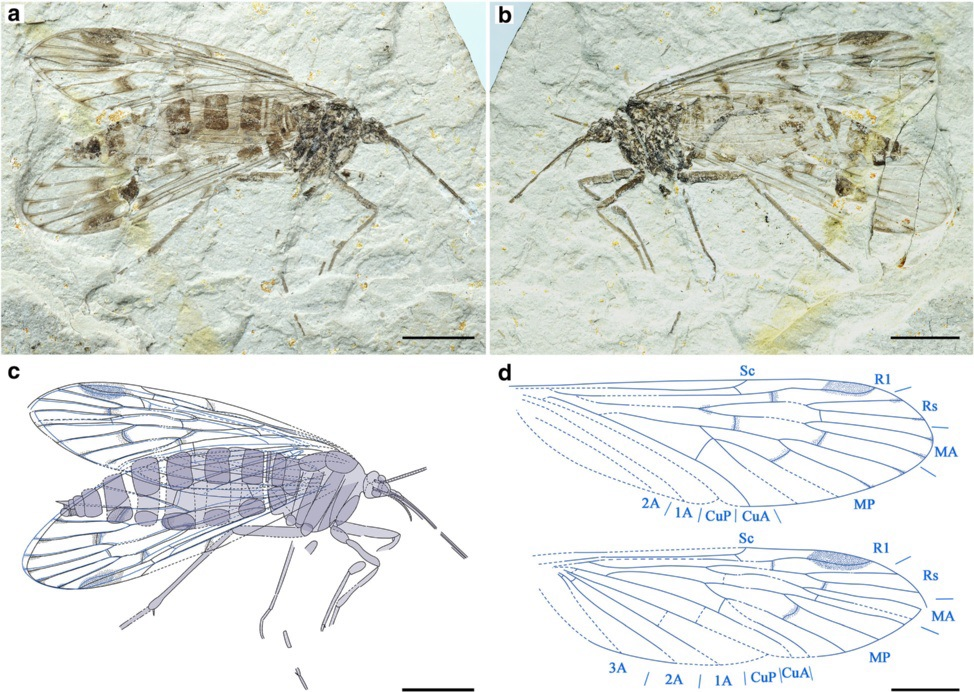
- Lichnomesopsyche daohugouensis

Scientific classification
- Domain: Eukaryota
- Kingdom: Animalia
- Phylum: Arthropoda
- Class: Insecta
- Order: Mecoptera
- Superfamily: †Mesopsychoidea
- Family: †Mesopsychidae; Tillyard, 1917

Genera
- See text

= Mesopsychidae =

Mesopsychidae Temporal range: Late Permian–Aptian

Extinct family of insects

Mesopsychidae is an extinct family of scorpionflies known from the Late Permian to Mid Cretaceous. It is part of Mesopsychoidea, a group of scorpionflies with siphonate proboscis. They are suggested to have been nectarivores, feeding off the liquid pollination drops and acting as pollinators for now extinct insect pollinated gymnosperms such as Bennettitales.

== Systematics ==
- Afristella Riek 1974 Molteno Formation, South Africa, Late Triassic (Carnian)
- Allochorista Hong 2007 Tongchuan Formation, China, Middle Triassic (Ladinian)
- Baissopsyche Novokshonov and Sukacheva 2001 Sharin-Gol Formation, Mongolia, Early Cretaceous (Barremian), Zaza Formation, Russia, Early Cretaceous (Aptian)
- Epicharmesopsyche Shih et al. 2013 Daohugou, China, Middle Jurassic (Callovian)
- Ferghanopsyche Martynov 1937 Sulyukta Formation, Kyrgyzstan, Early Jurassic (Toarcian)
- Lichnomesopsyche Ren et al. 2009 Daohugou, China, Callovian
- Mesopanorpodes Ren et al. 2009 Vokhma Formation, Russia, Late Permian (Changhsingian), Ashfield Shale, Australia, Middle Triassic (Anisian), Tongchuan Formation, China, Ladinian
- Mesopsyche Tillyard 1917 (Possibly paraphyletic) Vyazniki Formation, Mal'tseva Formation, Russia, Changhsingian, Blackstone Formation, Australia, Late Triassic (Norian)
- Mesoses Riek 1976 Gayndah Formation, Australia, Anisian, Molteno Formation, South Africa, Carnian
- Permopsyche Bashkuev 2011 Croudace Bay Formation, Australia, Changhsingian, Poldarsa Formation, Russia, Late Permian (Wuchiapingian)
- Ptychopteropsis Martynov 1937 Sulyukta Formation, Kyrgyzstan, Toarcian
- Sogdopsyche Martynov 1937 Jiulongshan Formation, China, Callovian Sulyukta Formation, Kyrgyzstan, Toarcian
- Tarantogus Sukatsheva 1985 Itat Formation, Russia, Middle Jurassic (Bajocian-Bathonian)
- Tipulidites Wieland 1925 Potrerillos Formation, Argentina, Carnian
- Turanopsyche Martynov 1937 Sulyukta Formation, Kyrgyzstan, Toarcian
- Turbidapsyche Lian and Huang 2024 Tongchuan Formation, China, Ladinian, Madygen Formation, Kyrgyzstan, Carnian, Amisan Formation, South Korea, Norian, Protopivka Formation, Ukraine, Norian
- Undisca Sukacheva 1990 Glushkovo Formation, Late Jurassic (Tithonian)
- Vitimopsyche Novokshonov and Sukacheva 2001 Daohugou, China, Callovian, Yixian Formation, China, Aptian Zaza Formation, Russia, Aptian
- Xinjiangia Hong 1983 Kezileinuer Formation, Xinjiang, China, Bajocian
