= Vitimopsyche =

Vitimopsyche Temporal range: Cretaceous

Scientific classification
- Domain: Eukaryota
- Kingdom: Animalia
- Phylum: Arthropoda
- Class: Insecta
- Order: Mecoptera
- Family: †Mesopsychidae
- Genus: †Vitimopsyche; Novokshonov & Sukacheva, 2001

Species
- Vitimopsyche kozlovi; Vitimopsyche torta

Extinct genus of insects

Vitimopsyche is an extinct genus of Mecopteran which existed in what is now northeastern China during the early Cretaceous period. It contains the species Vitimopsyche kozlovi and V. torta.
