= Burmaculex =

Burmaculex Temporal range: Cretaceous, 95 Ma

Scientific classification
- Kingdom: Animalia
- Phylum: Arthropoda
- Class: Insecta
- Order: Diptera
- Family: Culicidae
- Genus: †Burmaculex; Borkent & Grimaldi, 2004

Type species
- Burmaculex antiquus Borkent & Grimaldi, 2004

Species
- Burmaculex antiquus Borkent & Grimaldi, 2004; Burmaculex edwardsi Szadziewski et al., 2024; Burmaculex harbachi Szadziewski et al., 2024; Burmaculex porczynskii Szadziewski et al., 2024

Extinct genus of insect

Burmaculex is an extinct genus of mosquito found fossilised in Burmese amber dating from the Cretaceous period, believed to date from 95 million years ago. The genus and species were described in 2004 by Art Borkent and David A. Grimaldi.

Cladogram after Azar et al. (2023), although Libanoculex is later confirmed as member of Chaoboridae and not a mosquito.

- Corethrellidae
- Chaoboridae
- - †Libanoculex intermedius (Lebanese amber)
  - - †Burmaculex antiquus Borkent & Grimaldi, 2004 (Burmese amber)
    - Crown Culicidae
