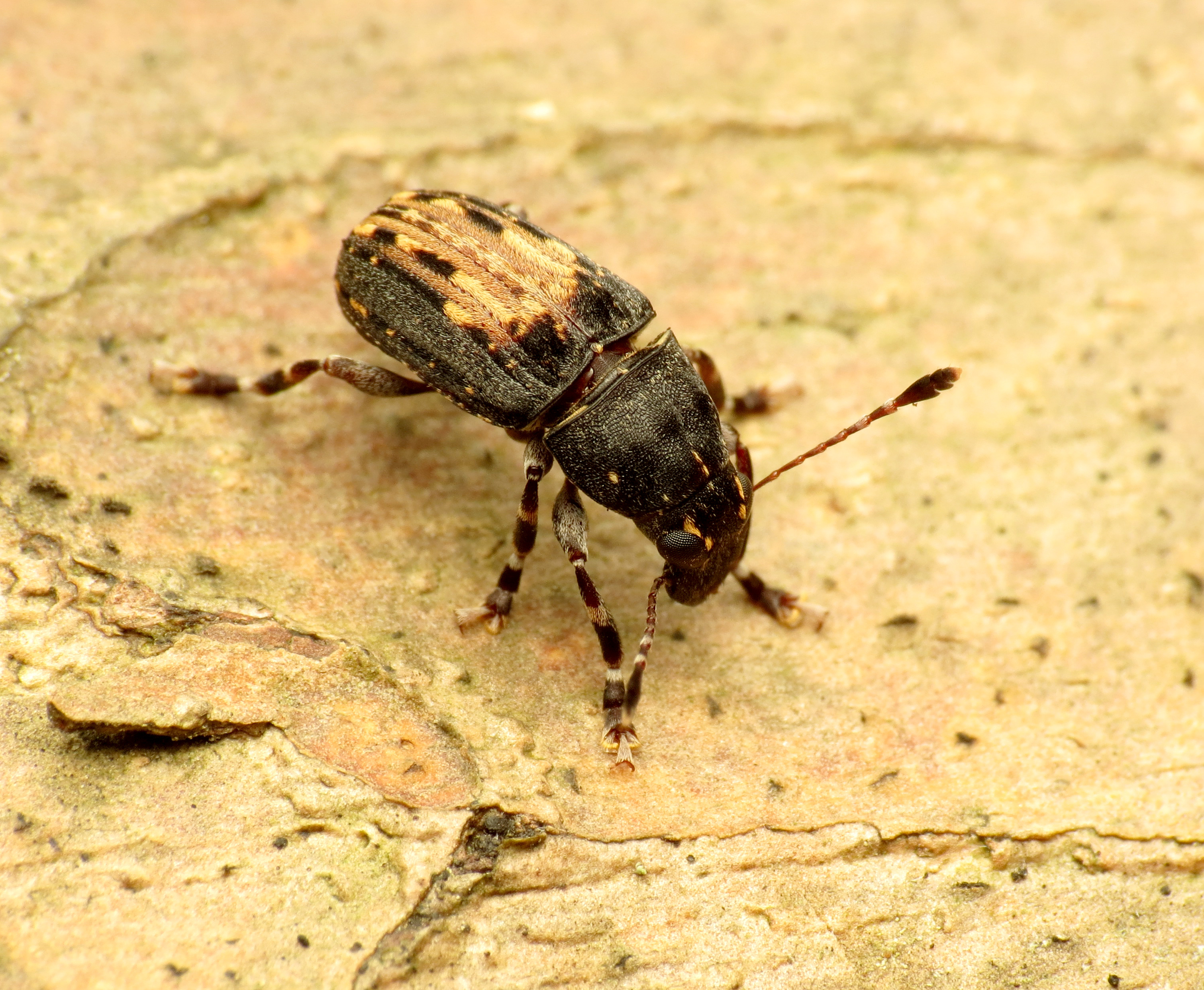
- Handsome fungus weevil (female), Piesocorynus plagifer

Scientific classification
- Kingdom: Animalia
- Phylum: Arthropoda
- Clade: Pancrustacea
- Class: Insecta
- Order: Coleoptera
- Suborder: Polyphaga
- Infraorder: Cucujiformia
- Superfamily: Curculionoidea
- Family: Anthribidae
- Subfamily: Anthribinae
- Tribe: Piesocorynini

= Piesocorynini =

Tribe of beetles

Piesocorynini is a tribe of fungus weevils in the family Anthribidae. There are at least 2 genera and about 8 described species in Piesocorynini.

== Genera ==
- Brachycorynus Valentine, 1998
- Piesocorynus Dejean, 1834
