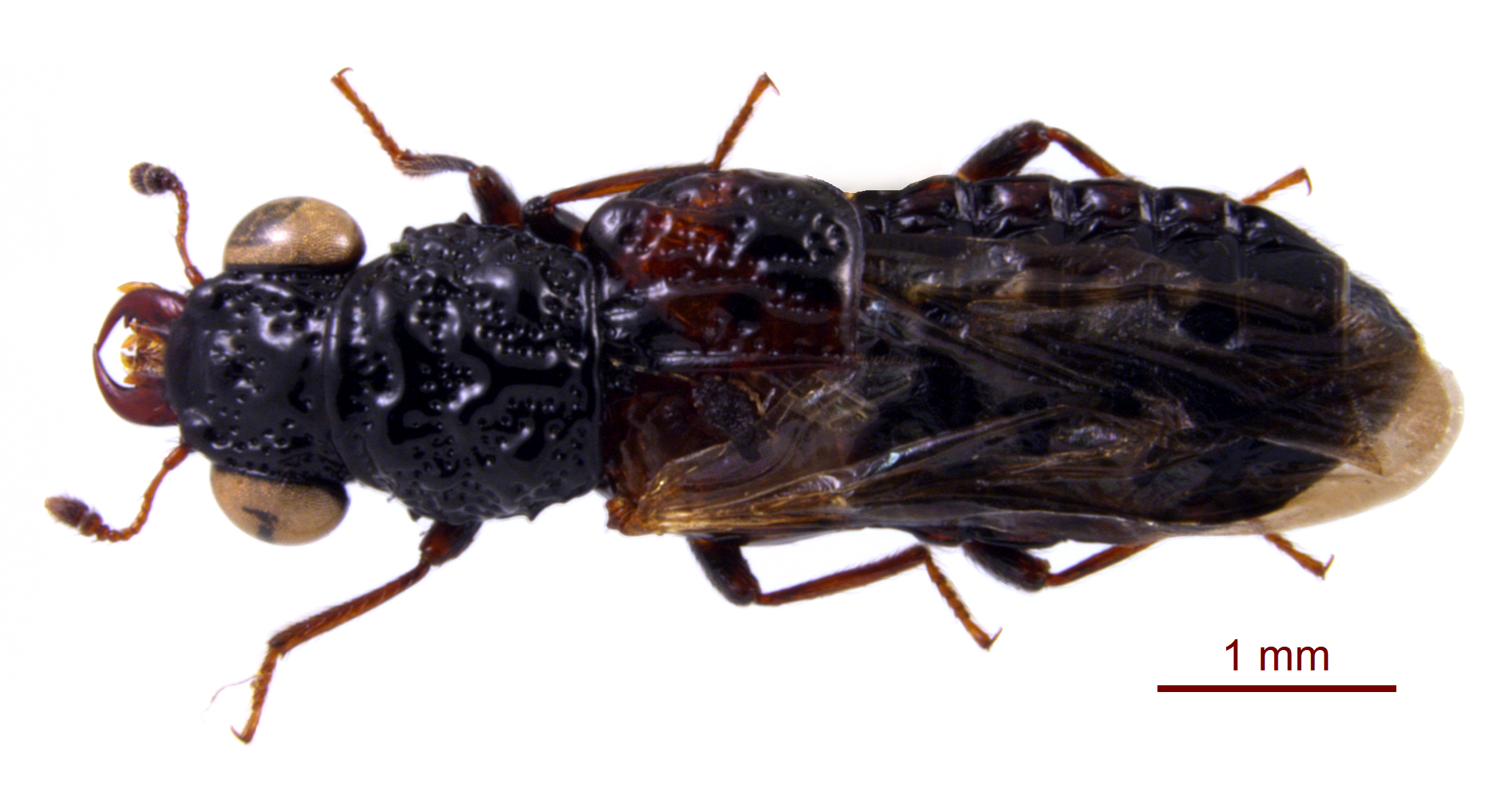
- Megalopinus caelatus

Scientific classification
- Kingdom: Animalia
- Phylum: Arthropoda
- Clade: Pancrustacea
- Class: Insecta
- Order: Coleoptera
- Suborder: Polyphaga
- Infraorder: Staphyliniformia
- Family: Staphylinidae
- Subfamily: Megalopsidiinae; Leng, 1920
- Genus: Megalopinus; Eichelbaum, 1915

Synonyms
- Genus synonymy: Aulacotrachelus Benick, L., 1920; Megalopsidia Leng, 1918; Megalops Erichson, 1839; Megalops Dejean, 1833; Subfamily synonymy: Megalopininae Naomi, 1986; Megalopininae Puthz, 1967; Stylopodinae Blackwelder, 1943; Aulacotrachelinae Benick, L., 1921; Megalopsinae Cameron, 1921; Megalopini Erichson, 1839

= Megalopinus =

Genus of beetles

Megalopinus is the only genus in the subfamily Megalopsidiinae of the Staphylinidae. Species in this genus have large eyes, antennae with distinct di- or trisegmented clubs. The tarsal formula is 5-5-5. They have unique elongated processes at the anterior margin of the labrum. They are found in decaying trees and fungus-infested logs. Four species are found in North America: Megalopinus caelatus (Gravenhorst, 1802), Megalopinus punctatus (Erichson, 1840), Megalopinus rufipes (LeConte, 1863) and Megalopinus lingafelteri Mainda, 2023.

So far, more than 430 species are known from the entire New World. From the Orientalis 74 (+ one fossil, Megalopinus extinctus Yamamoto & Solodovnikov, 2016, described from Burmese amber) species are known.

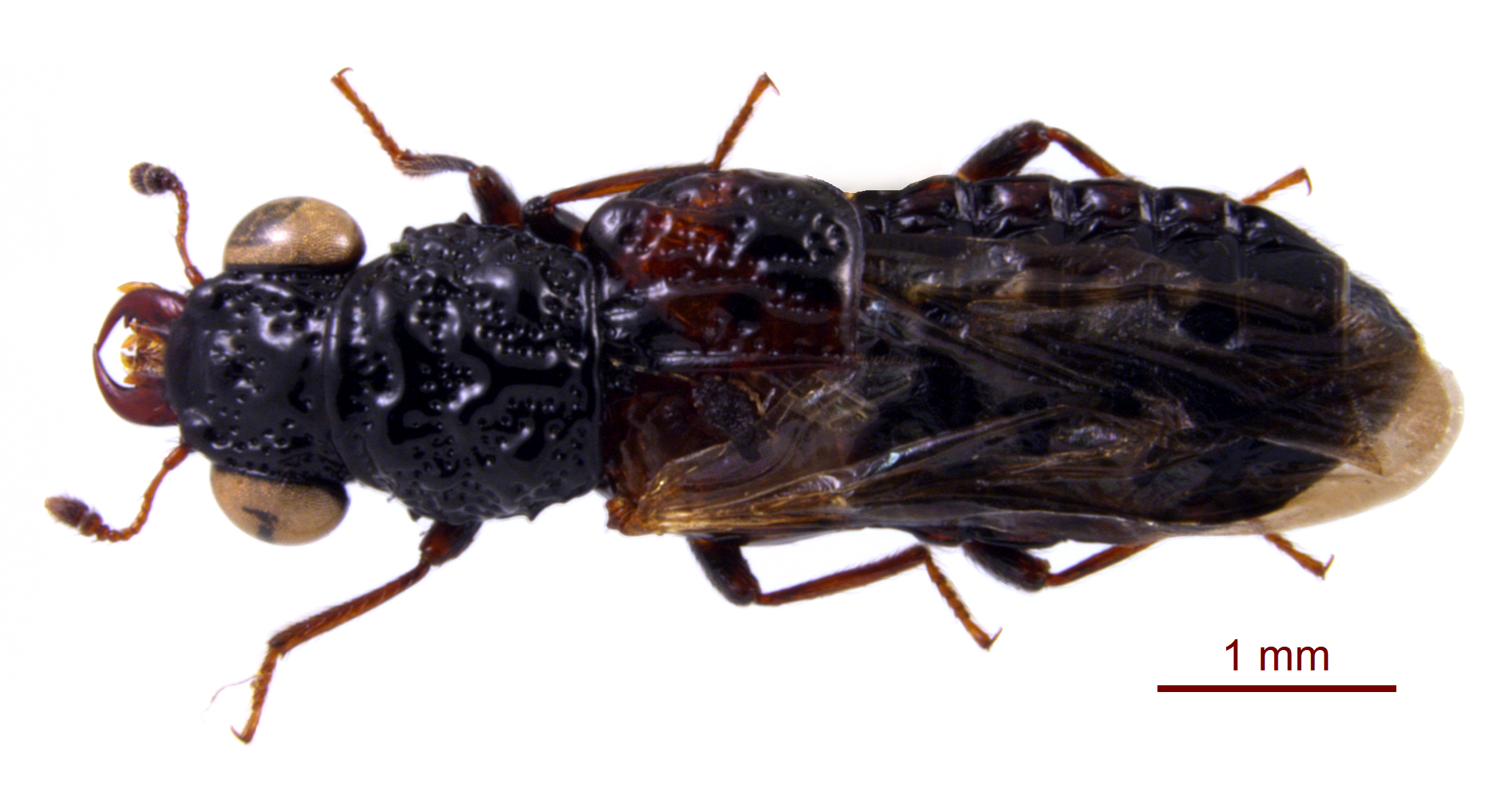
Megalopinus caelatus

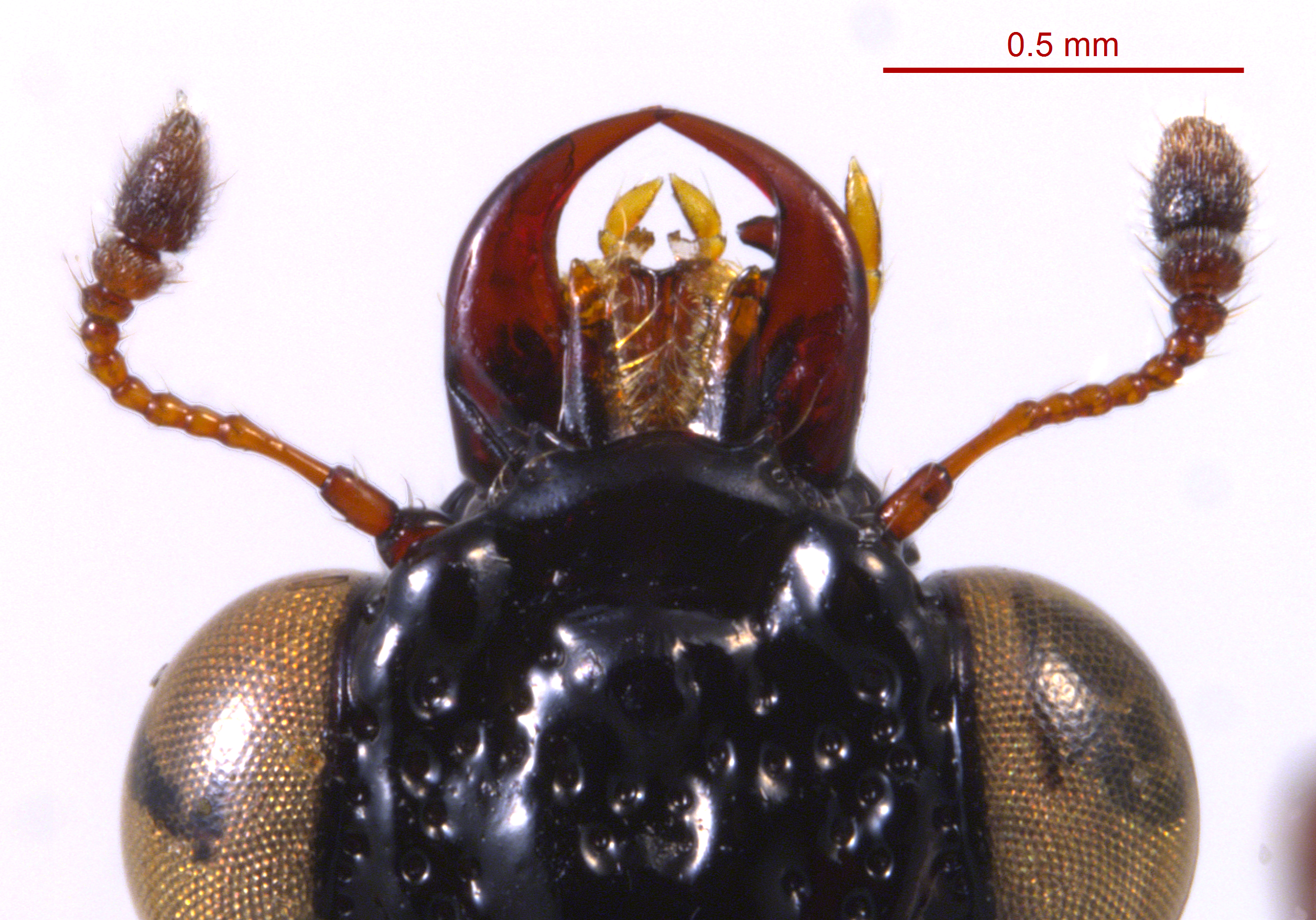
M. caelatus
