= Eugonus =

Scientific classification
- Domain: Eukaryota
- Kingdom: Animalia
- Phylum: Arthropoda
- Class: Insecta
- Order: Coleoptera
- Suborder: Polyphaga
- Infraorder: Cucujiformia
- Family: Anthribidae
- Tribe: Basitropidini
- Genus: Eugonus; Schoenherr, 1833

Genus of beetles

Eugonus is a genus of fungus weevils in the beetle family Anthribidae. There are about 18 described species in Eugonus.

== Species ==
These 18 species belong to the genus Eugonus:

- Eugonus adustus Poinar & Legalov, 2016
- Eugonus albofasciatus Motschulsky, 1874
- Eugonus angustus Poinar & Legalov, 2016
- Eugonus bicolor Valentine, 1972
- Eugonus bostrichoides Fahraeus, 1839
- Eugonus decorus Jordan, 1906
- Eugonus dermestoides Suffrian, 1870
- Eugonus diversipes Frieser, 1978
- Eugonus fallax Gemminger & Harold, 1872
- Eugonus languidus Frieser, 1978
- Eugonus ornatus Jordan, 1904
- Eugonus particolor Jordan, 1904
- Eugonus pictus Valentine, 1972
- Eugonus robustus Jordan, 1904
- Eugonus simplex Jordan, 1904
- Eugonus subcylindricus Fahraeus, 1839
- Eugonus tenuis Jordan, 1904
- Eugonus virgatus Gyllenhal, 1833
