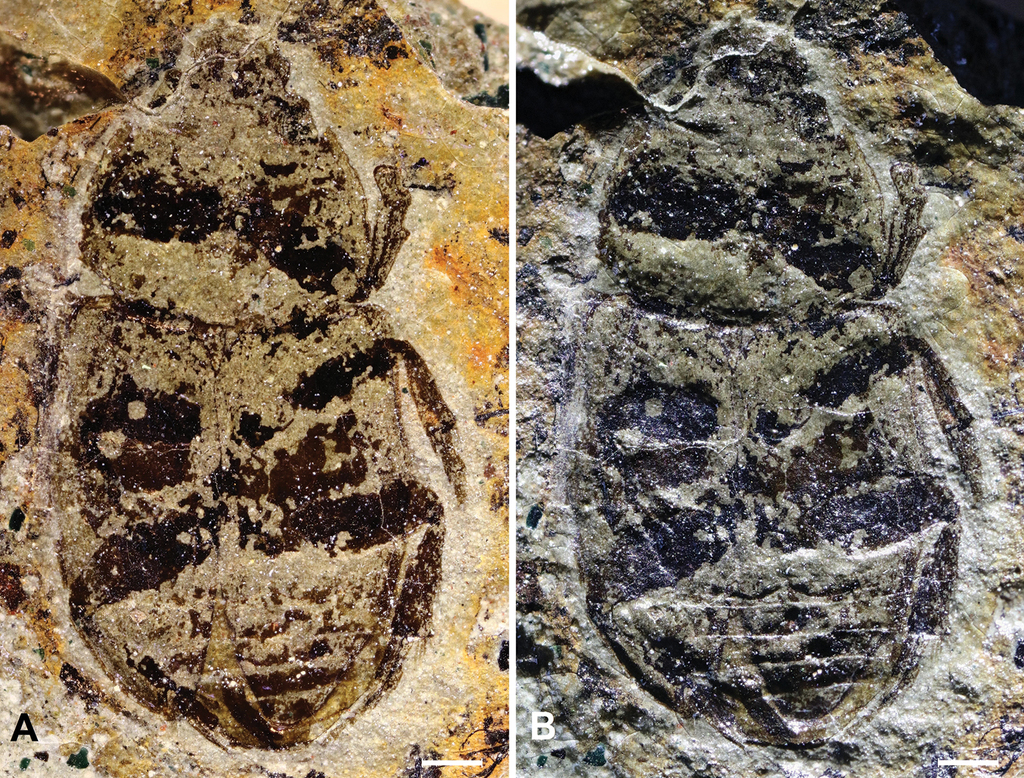

Scientific classification
- Kingdom: Animalia
- Phylum: Arthropoda
- Class: Insecta
- Order: Coleoptera
- Suborder: Polyphaga
- Infraorder: Scarabaeiformia
- Superfamily: Scarabaeoidea
- Genus: †Ceafornotensis; Woolley, 2016

Type species
- †Ceafornotensis archatiras Woolley, 2016

= Ceafornotensis =

Ceafornotensis Temporal range: Late Cretaceous

Extinct genus of beetles

Ceafornotensis is an extinct terrestrial genus of beetles in the superfamily Scaraboidea, with only one member, Ceafornotensis archratiras. It is currently extinct globally. Its name is based on the Old English word ceafor( chafer) and Greek word notius (south).

== Entomology ==
The holotype specimen of C. archatiras is BP/2/18654, an exoskeleton as a compressed fossil in a large mudstone in Orapa Diamond Mine near Serowe, Botswana.

== Taxonomy ==
Ceafornotensis contains the following species:

- Ceafornotensis archratiras (based on the two Greek words archaíos (ancient) and kratíras (crater) "in reference to the crater lake origin of the specimen".)

== Ecology ==
The mandible of C. archatiras does not link to any particular diet, and high chance it could an herbivore, scavenger, or fungivore.
