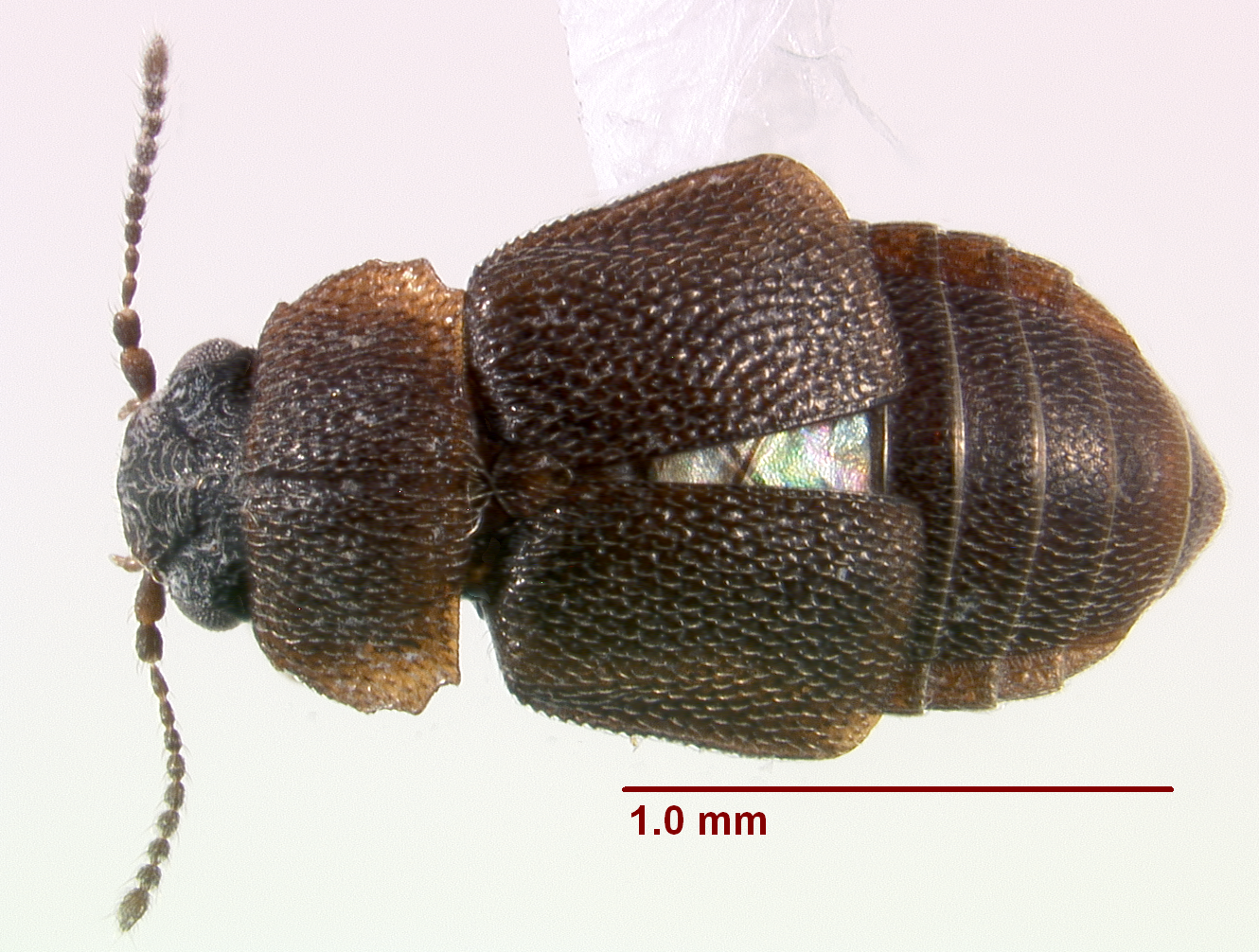
- Megarthrus americanus

Scientific classification
- Kingdom: Animalia
- Phylum: Arthropoda
- Clade: Pancrustacea
- Class: Insecta
- Order: Coleoptera
- Suborder: Polyphaga
- Infraorder: Staphyliniformia
- Family: Staphylinidae
- Subfamily: Proteininae; Erichson, 1839

= Proteininae =

Subfamily of beetles

Proteininae is a subfamily of Staphylinidae. It was first described in 1839 by Erichson.

== Anatomy ==
- Broad bodied.
- Small, under 3 mm.
- Elytra long, covering first visible abdominal tergite.
- Tarsi 5-5-5 in NA, 4-4-4 in some southern hemisphere taxa.
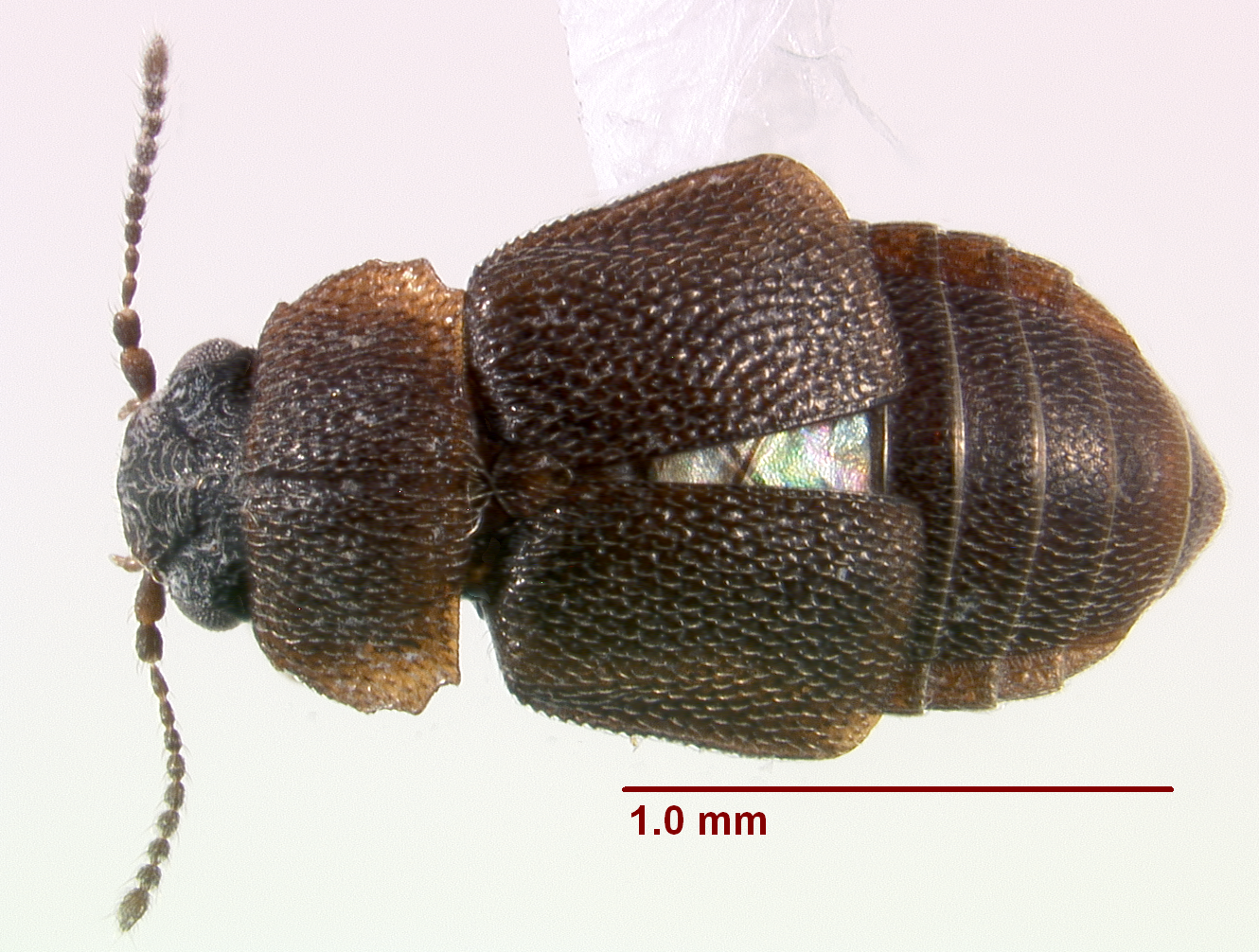
Megarthrus americanus

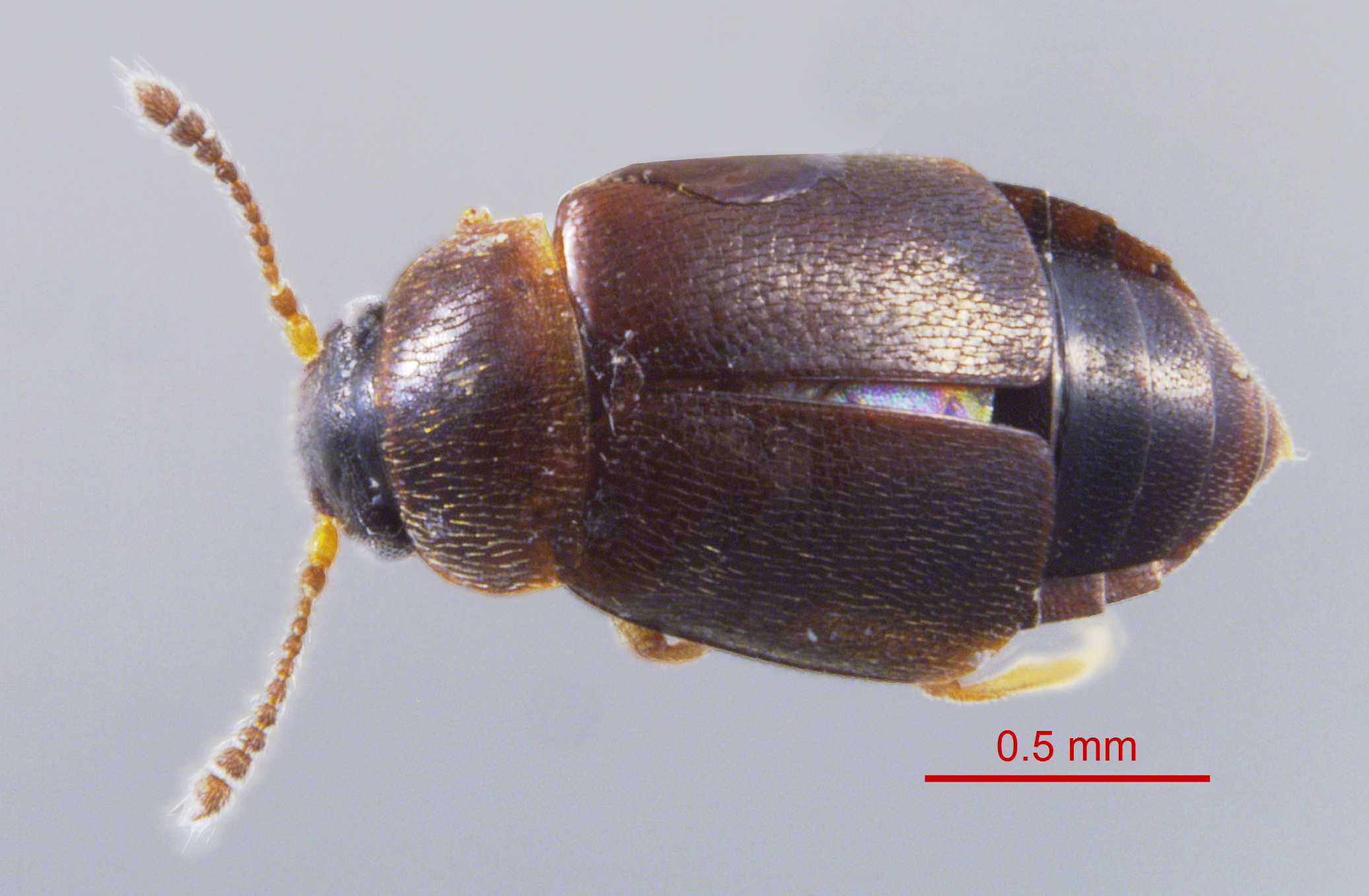
Proteinus sp.

== Ecology ==
- Habitat: found in fungi, under bark, in decaying vegetation, forest leaf litter.
- Collection method: sift/Berlese leaf litter.
- Biology: saprophages or mycophages.

== Systematics ==
There are currently 248 accepted species split between the following 13 genera:

- Alloproteinus
- Anepius
- Austrorhysus
- Eupsorus
- Megarthroides
- Megarthus
- Metopsia
- Mesoneus
- Paranesoneus
- Proteinus
- Quedius(provisionally accepted)
- Silphotelus
- †Vetuproteinus
