= Sucinoptinus =

Scientific classification
- Kingdom: Animalia
- Phylum: Arthropoda
- Class: Insecta
- Order: Coleoptera
- Suborder: Polyphaga
- Family: Ptinidae
- Genus: †Sucinoptinus; Bellés & Vitali, 2007

Extinct genus of beetles

Sucinoptinus is a genus of fossil beetles belonging to the family Ptinidae.

The species of this genus are found in Central Europe.

Species:

- Sucinoptinus brevipennis Bellés & Perkovsky, 2016
- Sucinoptinus bukejsi Alekseev, 2012
