= Mesoporini =

Scientific classification
- Kingdom: Animalia
- Phylum: Arthropoda
- Clade: Pancrustacea
- Class: Insecta
- Order: Coleoptera
- Suborder: Polyphaga
- Infraorder: Staphyliniformia
- Family: Staphylinidae
- Subfamily: Aleocharinae
- Tribe: Mesoporini; Cameron, 1959

Mesoporini is a tribe of rove beetles in the subfamily Aleocharinae. It was first described by Cameron in 1959. It contains 12 genera and 20 species. Recorded observations of members of Mesoporini have been made mostly in New Zealand, Suriname, the United States, and New Caledonia.

== Genera ==
- Ambracyptus
- Ampheida
- Anacyptus
- Callopsenius
- Dictyon
- Kisternerium
- Mesoporus
- Mesosymbion
- Mimodictyon
- Palaeomesoporus
- Paraconosoma
- Paradictyon
