= Orthorrhapha =

Historic order of insects

Orthorrhapha is a circumscriptional name which historically was used in entomology for an infraorder of Brachycera, one of the two suborders into which the order Diptera, the flies, are divided. As the group was paraphyletic, it has not been used in classifications in the last decade, and is effectively obsolete. However, many catalogs, checklists, and older works still contain the name. The taxa that used to be in the Orthorrhapha now comprise all of the infraorders in Brachycera excluding the Muscomorpha (= "Cyclorrhapha").

The recent revision of the taxonomy of the order Diptera by Pape et al. revived the name Orthorrhapha.
