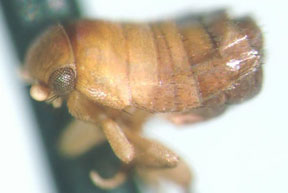

Scientific classification
- Domain: Eukaryota
- Kingdom: Animalia
- Phylum: Arthropoda
- Class: Insecta
- Order: Diptera
- Family: Phoridae
- Subfamily: Aenigmatiinae
- Genus: Aenigmatias; Meinert, 1890

Type species
- Aenigmatias blattoides Meinert, 1890

Synonyms
- Aegnimatias Meinert, 1890; Oniscomyia Enderlein, 1908; Platyphora Verrall, 1877; Platyphorella Strand, 1917; Psalidesma Becker, 1912; † Pseudaenigmatias Brown, 2016

= Aenigmatias =

Genus of flies

Aenigmatias is a genus of flies in the family Phoridae.

== Species ==
- A. brevifrons Schmitz, 1955
- A. coloradensis (Brues, 1914)
- A. curvinervis Borgmeier, 1962
- A. dorni (Enderlein, 1908)
- A. eurynotus (Brues, 1914)
- A. exreginae Jancík & Disney, 2020
- A. franzi Schmitz, 1950
- A. fuscipennis Borgmeier, 1963
- A. gotoi Disney, 2002
- A. highlandicus Schmitz, 1914
- † A. kishenehnensis Brown, 2019
- A. lubbocki (Verrall, 1877)
- A. nigricornis Borgmeier, 1963
- A. picipes Schmitz, 1927
- A. pyrenaicus (Becker, 1912)
- A. schwarzii Coquillett, 1903
