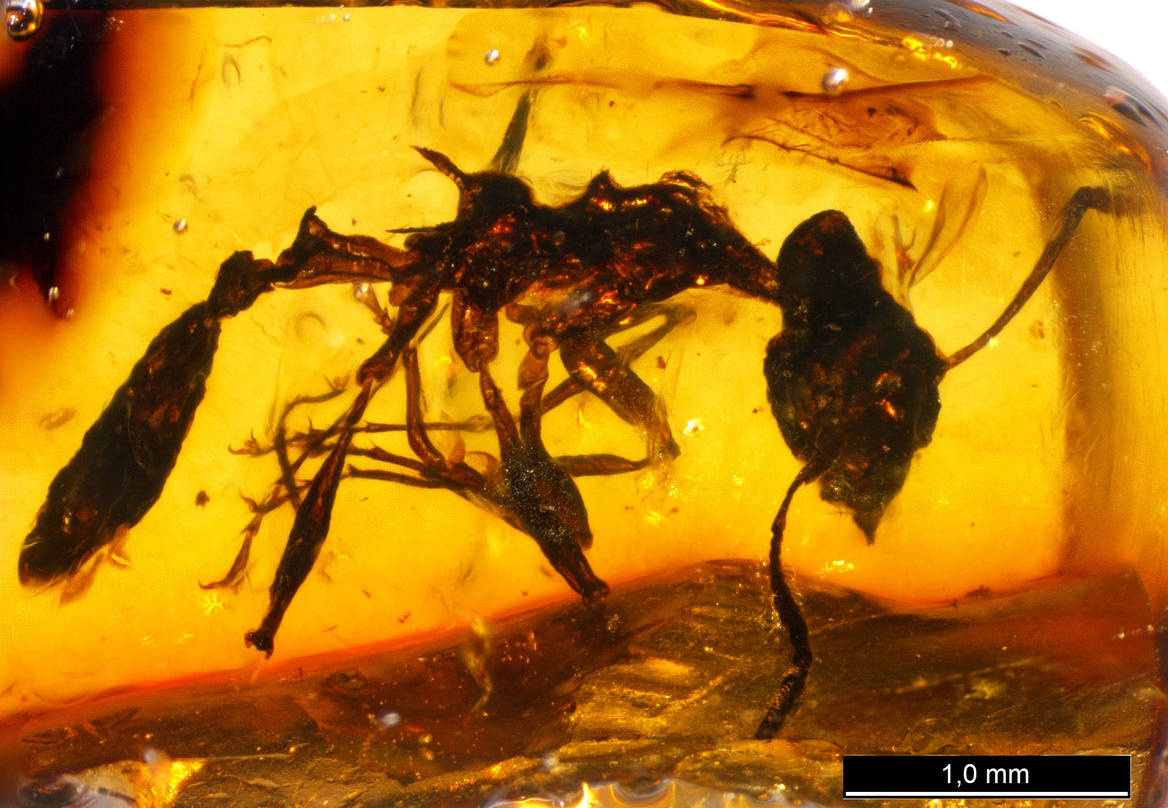
- Holotype

Scientific classification
- Kingdom: Animalia
- Phylum: Arthropoda
- Class: Insecta
- Order: Hymenoptera
- Family: Formicidae
- Subfamily: Myrmicinae
- Genus: Aphaenogaster
- Species: †A. dlusskyana

Binomial name
- †Aphaenogaster dlusskyana Radchenko & Perkovsky, 2016

= Aphaenogaster dlusskyana =

Aphaenogaster dlusskyana Temporal range: Middle Eocene

Extinct species of ant

Aphaenogaster dlusskyana is an extinct species of ant in the subfamily Myrmicinae known from a single Middle Eocene fossil found in amber on Sakhalin. At the time of description A. dlusskyana was one of eight ant species known from Sakhalin fossil.

== History and classification ==
A. dlusskyana is known from a single adult female fossil, the holotype, specimen number "PIN3387-172" which, at the time of the genus description, was residing in the Paleontological Institute, Russian Academy of Sciences, in Moscow. The described specimen is a worker caste adult preserved as an inclusion in a transparent chunk of Sakhalin amber. The amber specimen was recovered from deposits on Sakhalin island, in far eastern Russia during a 1972 collecting expedition. The expedition recovered amber from the beaches of the Okhotsk Sea at the mouth of the Naiba River and upstream on the banks of the river eroding out of exposures of Naibuchi Formation strata.

Sakhalin amber has been attributed a range of geological ages, with Vladimir Zherikhin in 1978 suggesting dates between 59 and 47 million years old. In 1988, Gennady Dlussky suggested a tentative Paleocene age, which was followed by subsequent authors through 2013. Research published in 1999 on the Naibuchi Formation, in which Sakhalin amber is directly preserved, however, gives a Middle Eocene age based on geological and paleobotanical context. The Sakhalin amber forest had a variety of plants living in a mixed coastal swamp, river, and lake environment. The river and lake system had numerous swampy areas that resulted in active peat bog formation. The bogs were surrounded by Osmunda, Nymphaeaceae and Ericaceae plants, while Taxodium, Alnus, Salix, and other trees populated the forest.

The amber fossil specimen was first studied by paleoentomologists A. G. Radchenko and E. E. Perkovsky of the National Academy of Sciences of Ukraine, with their 2016 type description for the species being published in the Paleontological Journal. The species name was coined as a patronym honoring the Russian paleoentomologist and myrmecologist Gennady Dlussky, who had died in 2014. Radchenko and Perkovsky suggested in the description that A. dlusskyana was the oldest described Myrmicinae species belonging to a living genus of the subfamily. They noted older fossils are reported in the literature, but no detailed descriptions of the specimens have been published.

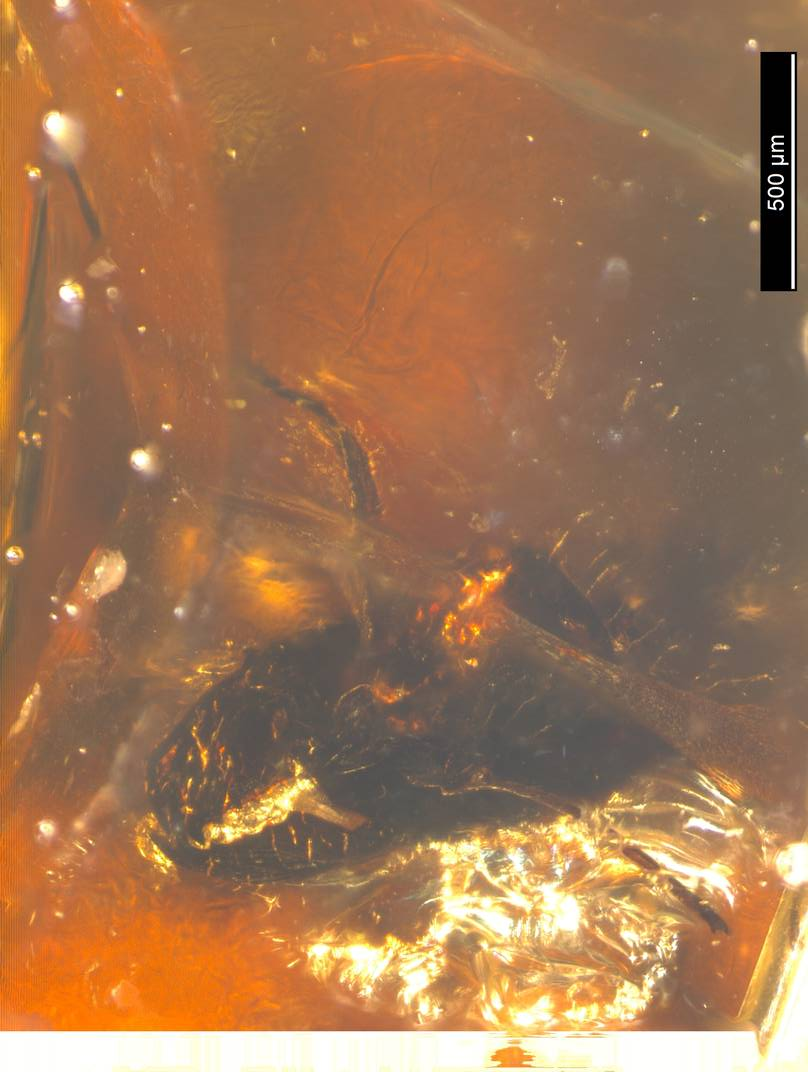
Head of the A. dlusskyana holotype

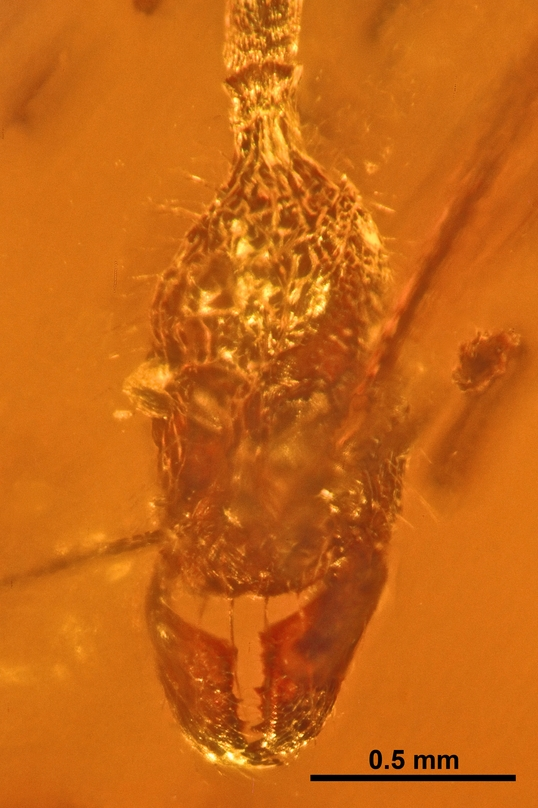
Head of the Aphaenogaster amphioceanica holotype

A. dlusskyana has a pair of distinctive long spines near the rear of her propodeum that are not seen in any of the late Eocene European amber species, or in any Upper Eocene United States amber species. Workers of two amber species, Aphaenogaster amphioceanica from Miocene Dominican amber and Aphaenogaster praerelicta from Late Oligocene to Early Miocene Mexican Amber have similar spines. A. dlusskyana is separated from A. praerelicta in the shape of the spines, which widen near the base in A. praerelicta, in the more rounded petiole of the A. dlusskyana, and overall size, with A. praerelicta workers being more than 2 mm (0.079 in) longer. A. amphioceanica has a very elongated head that does not have distinct rear corners, rather the rear margin forms a "collar" shape, features not seen in the A. dlusskyana worker.

== Description ==
The single worker of A. dlusskyana has a 4.0 mm (0.16 in) long body and a 0.77 mm (0.030 in) long head. The body has a number of long hairs scattered on it, with a large amount present on the upper surface of the gaster, while the tarsi have a dense covering of hairs that lie almost flat and curl upward at the tips. There is coarse parallel ridging running the length of the mesosoma, and the gaster, waist, and head are smooth with no surface sculpturing. The head is rectangular in outline, being 1.3 times as long as wide and with very slightly convex sides. The rear margin of the head also is slightly convex and the rear corners are "narrowly" rounded. Two lobes are well developed toward the front of the head, and partly cover the bases of the antennae and antennal sockets. The antennae are composed of 12 segments, each of the segments being elongated, and the last four at the tip forming a club. At the base, the scape is elongated and one third of its length projects past the rear edge of the head. On each of the triangular shaped mandibles, the inner chewing surface is 80 percent as long as the whole mandible length.
