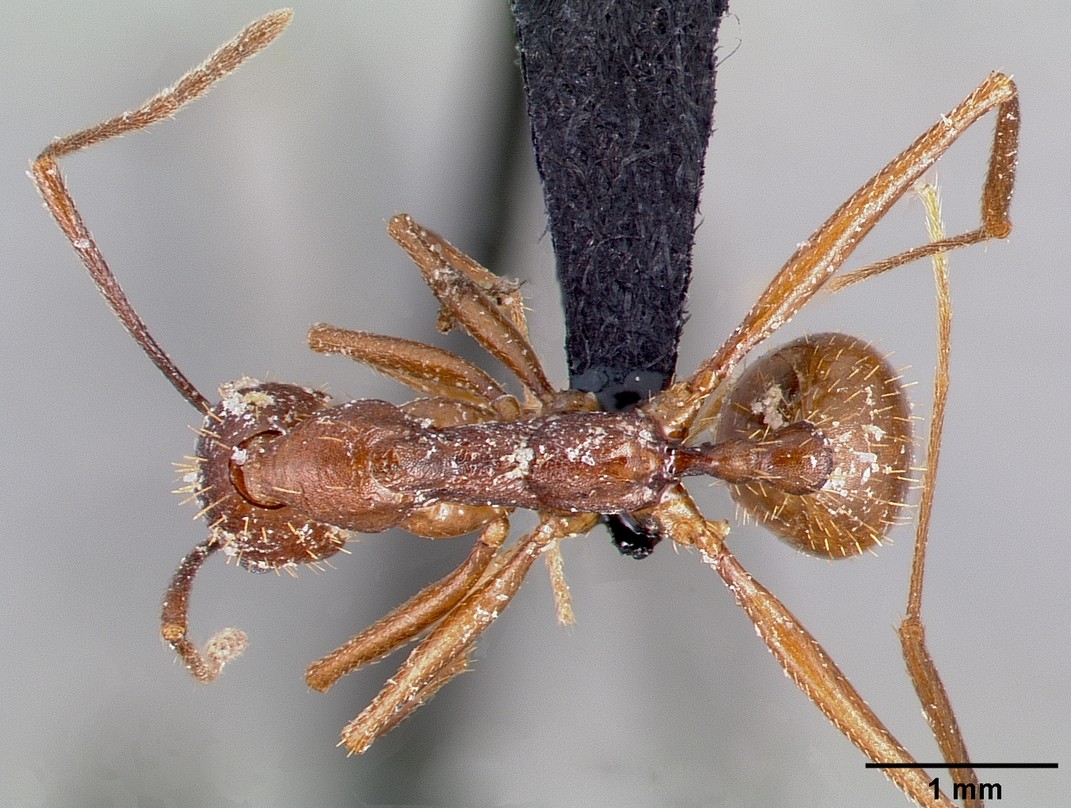

Scientific classification
- Domain: Eukaryota
- Kingdom: Animalia
- Phylum: Arthropoda
- Class: Insecta
- Order: Hymenoptera
- Family: Formicidae
- Subfamily: Myrmicinae
- Tribe: Stenammini
- Genus: Aphaenogaster
- Species: A. huachucana

Binomial name
- Aphaenogaster huachucana Creighton, 1934

= Aphaenogaster huachucana =

Species of ant

Aphaenogaster huachucana is a species of ant in the family Formicidae.

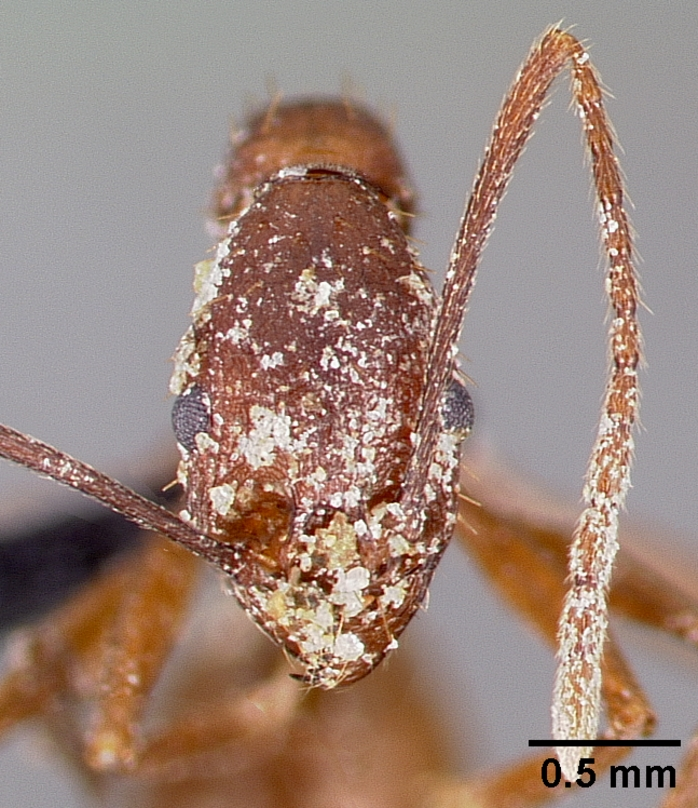

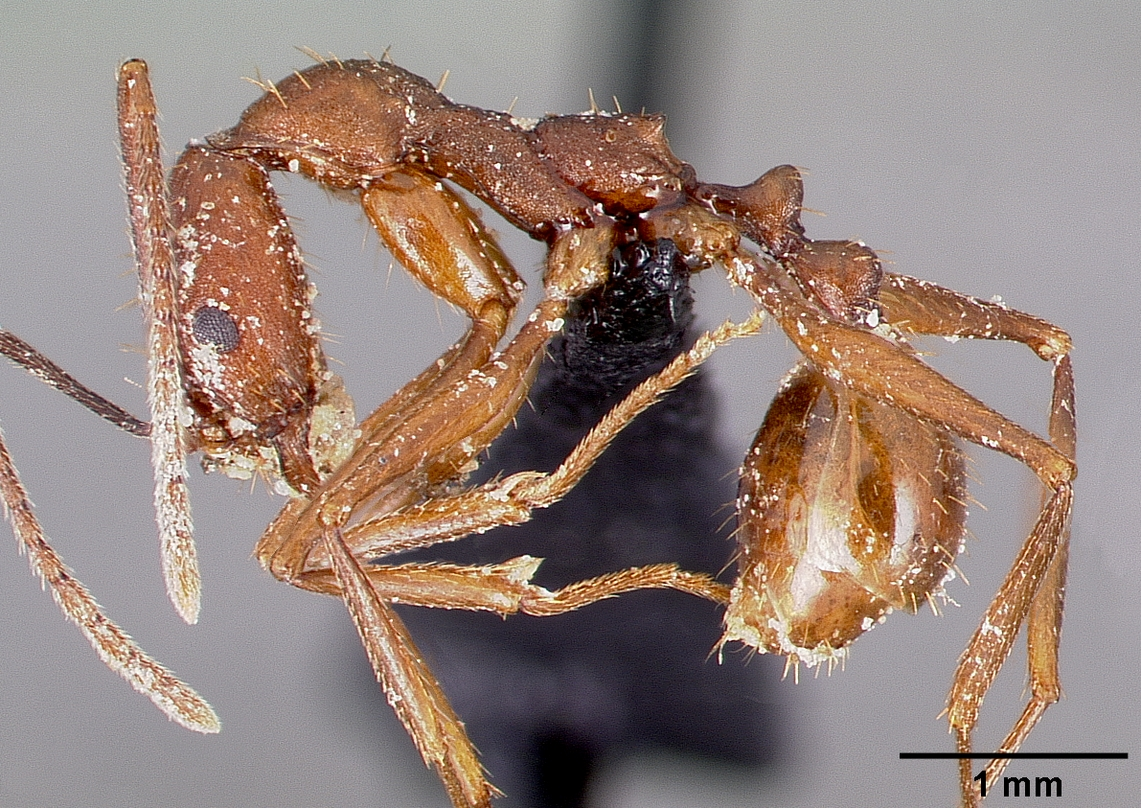

== Subspecies ==
These two subspecies belong to the species Aphaenogaster huachucana:

- Aphaenogaster huachucana crinimera Cole, 1953^{i c g}
- Aphaenogaster huachucana huachucana Creighton, 1934^{i c g}

Data sources: i = ITIS, c = Catalogue of Life, g = GBIF, b = Bugguide.net
