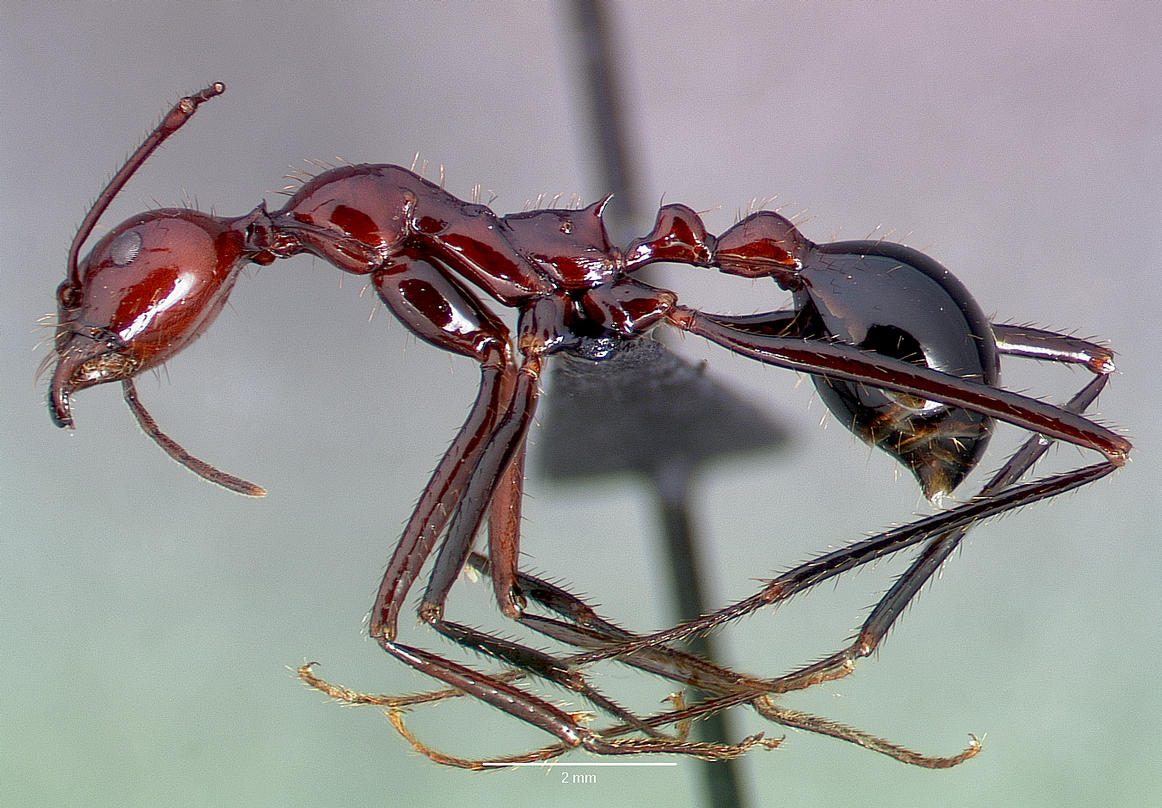
- A. swammerdami worker

Scientific classification
- Kingdom: Animalia
- Phylum: Arthropoda
- Clade: Pancrustacea
- Class: Insecta
- Order: Hymenoptera
- Family: Formicidae
- Subfamily: Myrmicinae
- Tribe: Stenammini
- Genus: Aphaenogaster; Mayr, 1853

Type species
- Aphaenogaster sardoa Mayr, 1853

Diversity
- 200 species

Synonyms
- Deromyrma Forel, 1913; Nystalomyrma Wheeler, 1916

= Aphaenogaster =

Aphaenogaster Temporal range: Lutetian - recent

Genus of ants

Aphaenogaster is a genus of myrmicine ants in the tribe Stenammini. About 200 species have been described, including 18 fossil species. They occur worldwide except in South America south of Colombia, sub-Saharan Africa, and Antarctica.

Aphaenogaster colonies have monomorphic workers. They have four-segmented antennal clubs and 12-segmented antennae.

In Australia, they often build dense, conspicuous nests. Nest entrances are generally funnel-shaped with diameters up to 4 cm, which resulted in the common name funnel ants. These nests can be a serious problem for golfers or on pastures and unsealed airstrips, because the fragile surface easily collapses under pressure. Where it occurs, Aphaenogaster bioturbation is an important soil and landscape process.

Aphaenogaster ants probably get most of their food from tended aphids on the roots of plants, which explains that they are rarely seen on the surface. The funnel-shaped openings could play a role in trapping arthropods, which are also eaten.

== Species ==
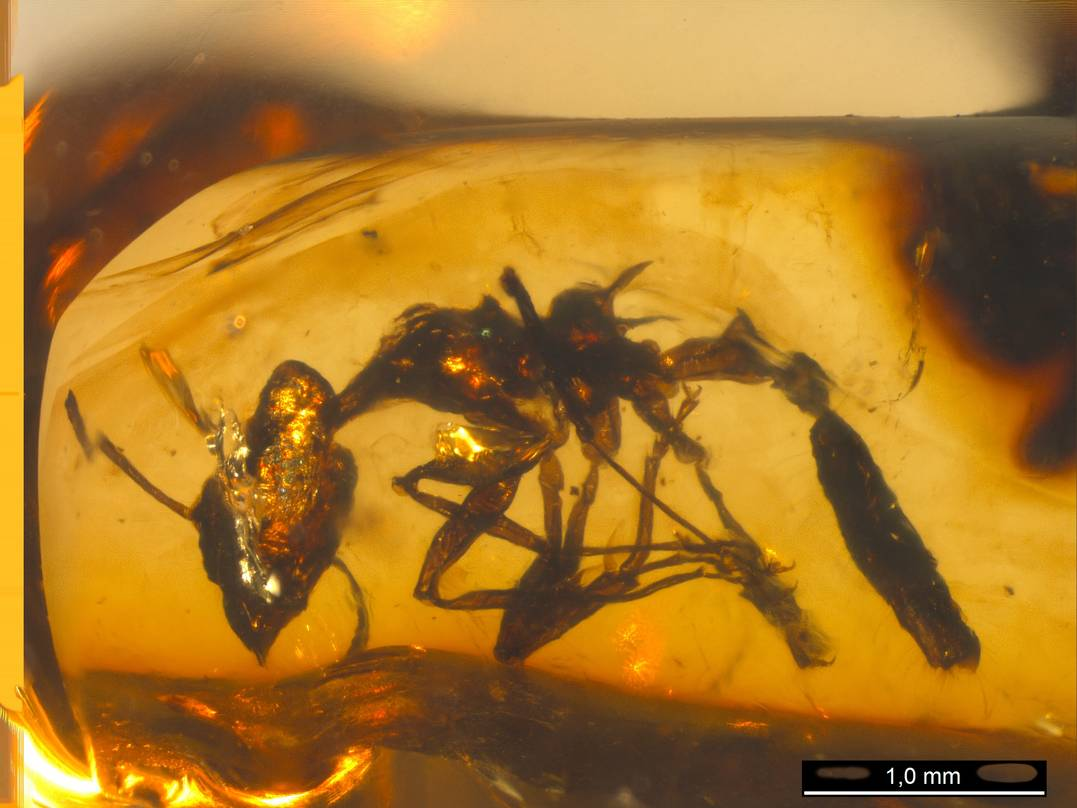
Aphaenogaster dlusskyana worker in amber

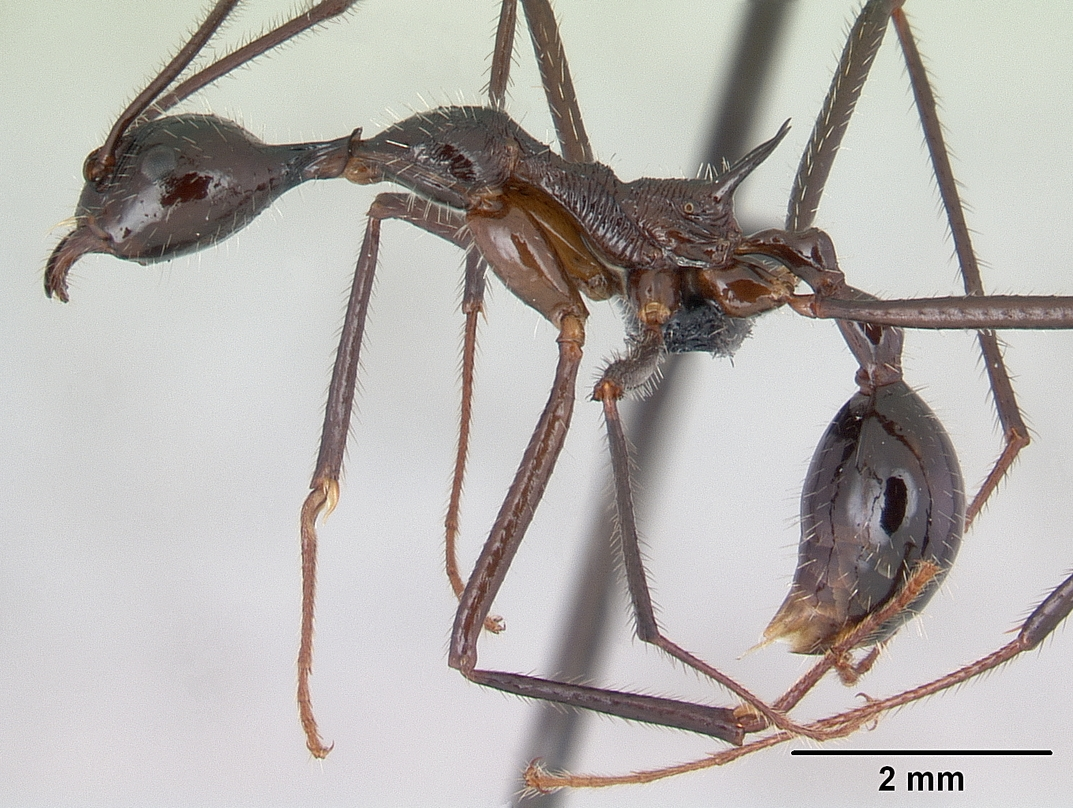
Aphaenogaster gonacantha worker

A. lepida worker and male

- A. aktaci Kiran & Tezcan, 2008
- †A. amphioceanica De Andrade, 1995
- A. angulata Viehmeyer, 1922
- A. annandalei Mukerjee, 1930
- †A. antiqua Dlussky & Perkovsky, 2002
- A. araneoides Emery, 1890
- †A. archaica (Meunier, 1915)
- A. ashmeadi (Emery, 1895)
- A. asterioni Borowiec, Menchetti, Salata, Vila & Zięcina, 2024
- A. atlantis Santschi, 1929
- †A. avita Fujiyama, 1970
- A. balcanica (Emery, 1898)

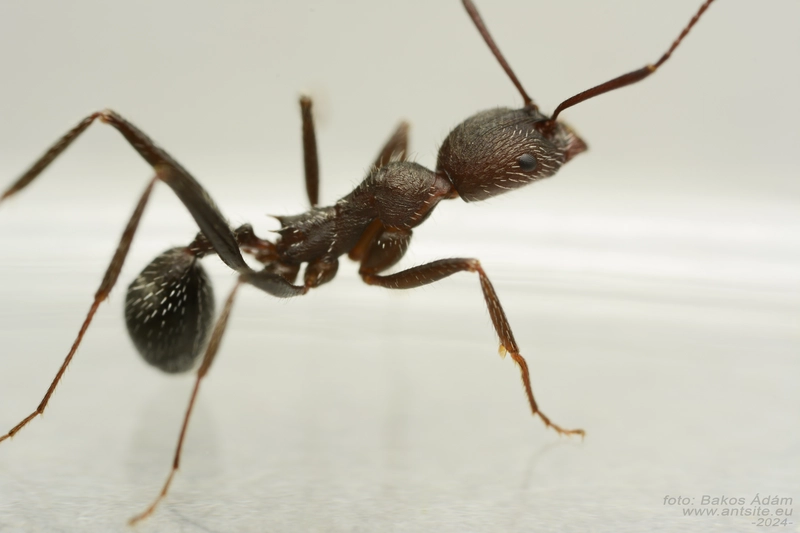
A. balcanica

- A. balcanicoides Boer, 2013
- A. baogong Terayama, 2009
- A. barbara Shattuck, 2008
- A. barbigula Wheeler, 1916
- A. baronii Cagniant, 1988
- A. beccarii Emery, 1887
- A. beesoni Donisthorpe, 1933
- A. boulderensis Smith, 1941
- A. burri (Donisthorpe, 1950)
- A. caeciliae Viehmeyer, 1922
- A. campana Emery, 1878
- A. cardenai Espadaler, 1981
- A. carolinensis Wheeler, 1915
- A. cavernicola Donisthorpe, 1938
- A. cecconii Emery, 1894
- A. concolor Watanabe & Yamane, 1999
- A. cristata (Forel, 1902)
- A. crocea André, 1881
- A. curiosa Santschi, 1933
- A. dejeani Cagniant, 1982
- A. depilis Santschi, 1911
- A. depressa Bolton, 1995
- †A. dlusskyana Radchenko & Perkovsky, 2016
- A. dlusskyi Radchenko & Arakelian, 1991
- A. donann Watanabe & Yamane, 1999
- †A. donisthorpei Carpenter, 1930
- A. dromedaria (Emery, 1900)
- A. dulciniae Emery, 1924
- †A. dumetora (Lin, 1982)
- A. edentula Watanabe & Yamane, 1999
- A. epirotes (Emery, 1895)
- A. erabu Nishizono & Yamane, 1990
- A. espadaleri Cagniant, 1984
- A. exasperata Wheeler, 1921
- A. fabulosa Arnol'di, 1968
- A. fallax Cagniant, 1992
- A. famelica (Smith, 1874)
- A. faureli Cagniant, 1969
- A. feae Emery, 1889
- A. fengbo Terayama, 2009
- A. festae Emery, 1915
- A. finzii Müller, 1921
- A. flemingi Smith, 1928
- A. floridana Smith, 1941
- A. foreli Cagniant, 1996
- A. friederichsi Forel, 1918
- A. fulva Roger, 1863
- A. geei Wheeler, 1921
- A. gemella (Roger, 1862)
- A. georgica Arnol'di, 1968
- A. gibbosa (Latreille, 1798)
- A. gonacantha (Emery, 1899)
- A. gracillima Watanabe & Yamane, 1999
- A. graeca Schulz, 1994
- A. haarlovi Collingwood, 1961
- A. hesperia Santschi, 1911
- A. holtzi (Emery, 1898)
- A. honduriana Mann, 1922
- A. huachucana Creighton, 1934
- A. hunanensis Wu & Wang, 1992
- A. iberica Emery, 1908
- A. incurviclypea Wang & Zheng, 1997
- A. inermita Bolton, 1995
- A. iranica Kiran & Alipanah, 2013
- A. irrigua Watanabe & Yamane, 1999
- A. isekram Bernard, 1977
- A. italica Bondroit, 1918
- A. januschevi Arnol'di, 1976
- A. japonica Forel, 1911
- A. karpathica Boer, 2013
- A. kervillei Forel, 1910
- A. kimberleyensis Shattuck, 2008
- A. koniari Cagniant & Galkowski, 2013
- A. kumejimana Watanabe & Yamane, 1999
- A. kurdica Ruzsky, 1905
- A. laevior Emery, 1887
- A. lamellidens Mayr, 1886
- †A. lapidescens Zhang, 1989
- A. ledouxi Tohmé, 1969
- A. lepida Wheeler, 1930
- A. lesbica Forel, 1913
- A. leveillei Emery, 1881
- †A.? longaeva (Scudder, 1877)
- A. longiceps (Smith, 1858)

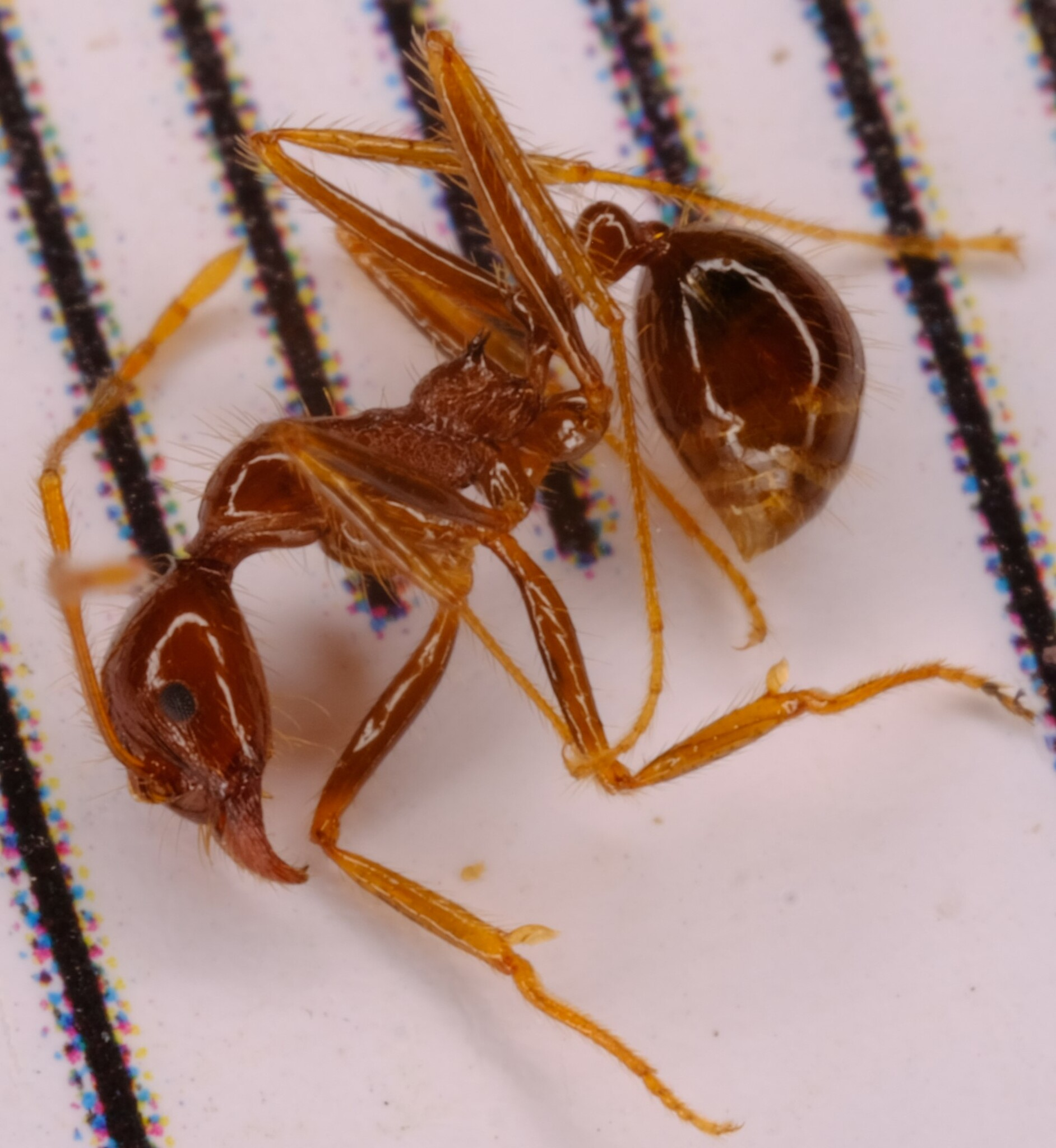
A. longiceps

- A. loriai (Emery, 1897)
- A. lustrans Smith, 1961
- A. luteipes Watanabe & Yamane, 1999
- †A. maculata Théobald, 1937
- A. maculifrons Kiran & Tezcan, 2008
- †A. maculipes Théobald, 1937
- A. mariae Forel, 1886
- A. mauritanica Dalla Torre, 1893
- †A. mayri Carpenter, 1930
- A. mediterrae Shattuck, 2008
- A. megommata Smith, 1963
- A. melitensis Santschi, 1933
- †A. mersa Wheeler, 1915
- A. messoroides Dlussky, Soyunov & Zabelin, 1990
- A. mexicana (Pergande, 1896)
- A. miamiana Wheeler, 1932
- A. miniata Cagniant, 1990
- A. minutula Watanabe & Yamane, 1999
- A. muelleriana Wolf, 1915
- A. mutica Pergande, 1896
- A. nadigi Santschi, 1923
- A. obsidiana (Mayr, 1861)
- A. occidentalis (Emery, 1895)

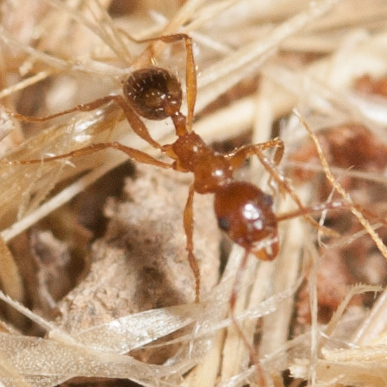
A. occidentalis

- †A. oligocenica Wheeler, 1915
- A. opposita (Say, 1836)
- A. osimensis Teranishi, 1940
- A. ovaticeps (Emery, 1898)
- A. pallescens Walker, 1871
- A. pallida (Nylander, 1849)
- †A. paludosa Zhang, 1989
- †A. pannonica Bachmayer, 1960
- A. patruelis Forel, 1886
- A. perplexa Smith, 1961
- A. phalangium Emery, 1890
- A. phillipsi Wheeler & Mann, 1916
- A. picea (Wheeler, 1908)
- A. picena Baroni Urbani, 1971
- A. polyodonta Zhou, 2001
- A. poultoni Crawley, 1922
- A. praedo Emery, 1908
- A. praenoda Santschi, 1933
- †A. praerelicta De Andrade, 1995
- A. projectens Donisthorpe, 1947
- A. pumilopuncta Zhou, 2001
- A. punctaticeps MacKay, 1989
- A. pythia Forel, 1915

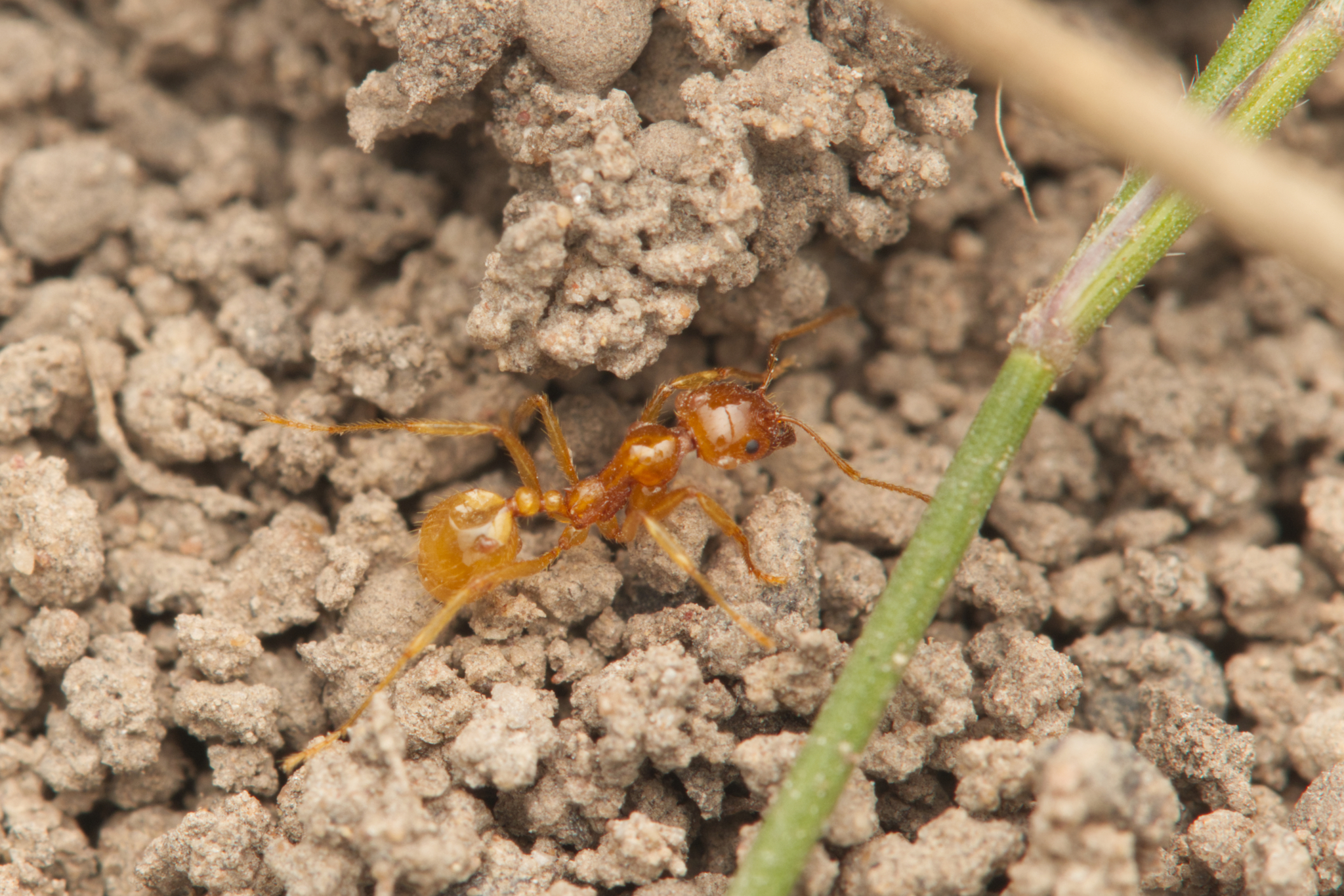
A. pytia

- A. quadrispina Emery, 1911
- A. radchenkoi Kiran & Tezcan, 2008
- A. reichelae Shattuck, 2008
- A. relicta Wheeler & Mann, 1914
- A. rhaphidiiceps (Mayr, 1877)
- A. rifensis Cagniant, 1994
- A. rothneyi (Forel, 1902)
- A. rudis Enzmann, 1947

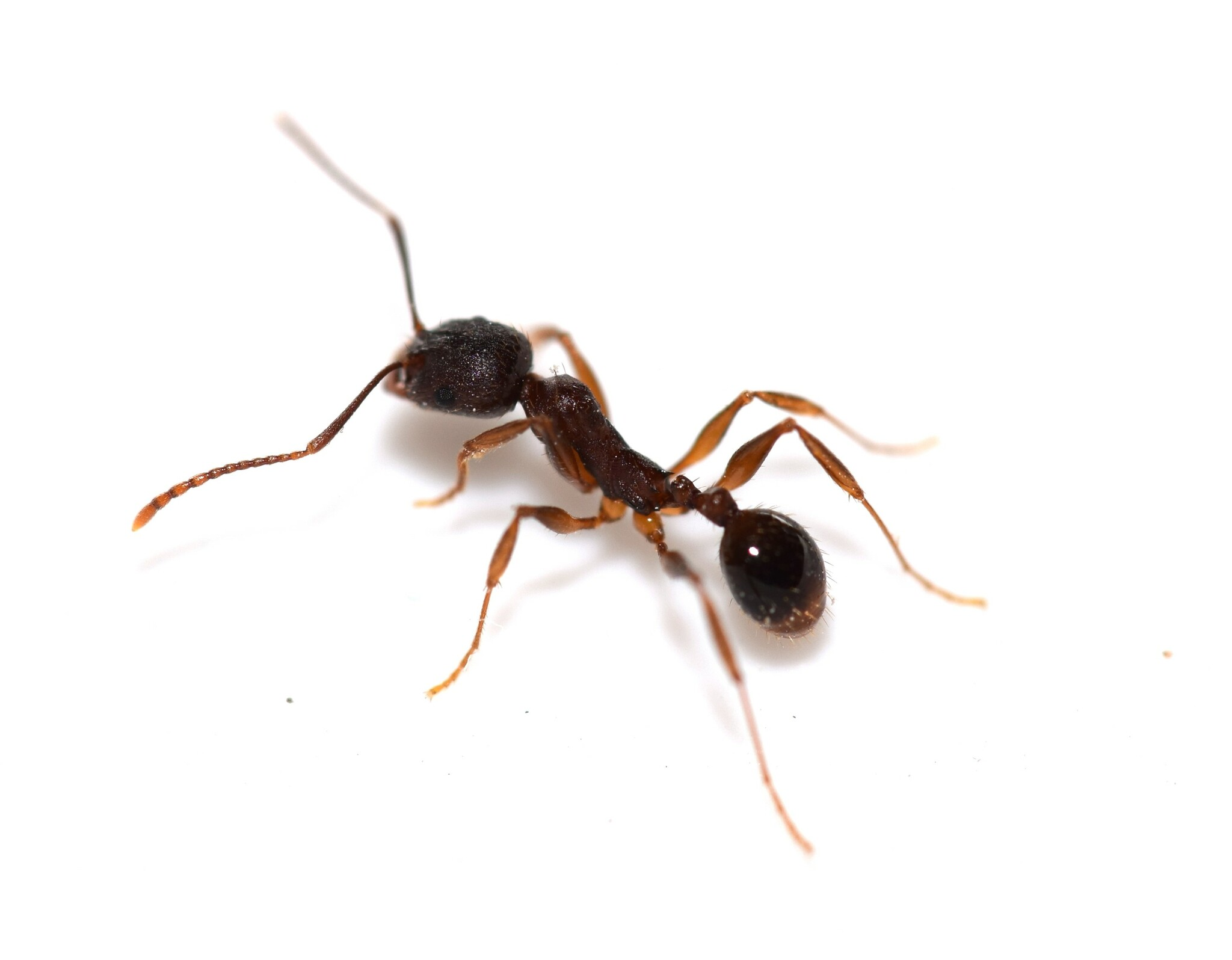
A. rudis

- A. rugosoferruginea Forel, 1889
- A. rugulosa Watanabe & Yamane, 1999
- A. rupestris Forel, 1909
- A. sagei (Forel, 1902)
- A. saharensis Bernard, 1953
- A. sangiorgii (Emery, 1901)
- A. sardoa Mayr, 1853
- A. schmidti Karavaiev, 1912
- A. schurri (Forel, 1902)
- A. semipolita (Nylander, 1856)
- A. senilis Mayr, 1853
- †A. shanwangensis (Hong, 1984)
- A. sicardi Cagniant, 1990
- A. sicula Emery, 1908
- A. simonellii Emery, 1894
- A. smythiesii (Forel, 1902)
- †A. sommerfeldti Mayr, 1868
- A. spinosa Emery, 1878
- A. splendida (Roger, 1859)
- A. sporadis Santschi, 1933
- A. striativentris Forel, 1895
- A. strioloides Forel, 1890
- A. subcostata Viehmeyer, 1922
- A. subexaperata Zhou, 2001
- A. subterranea (Latreille, 1798)

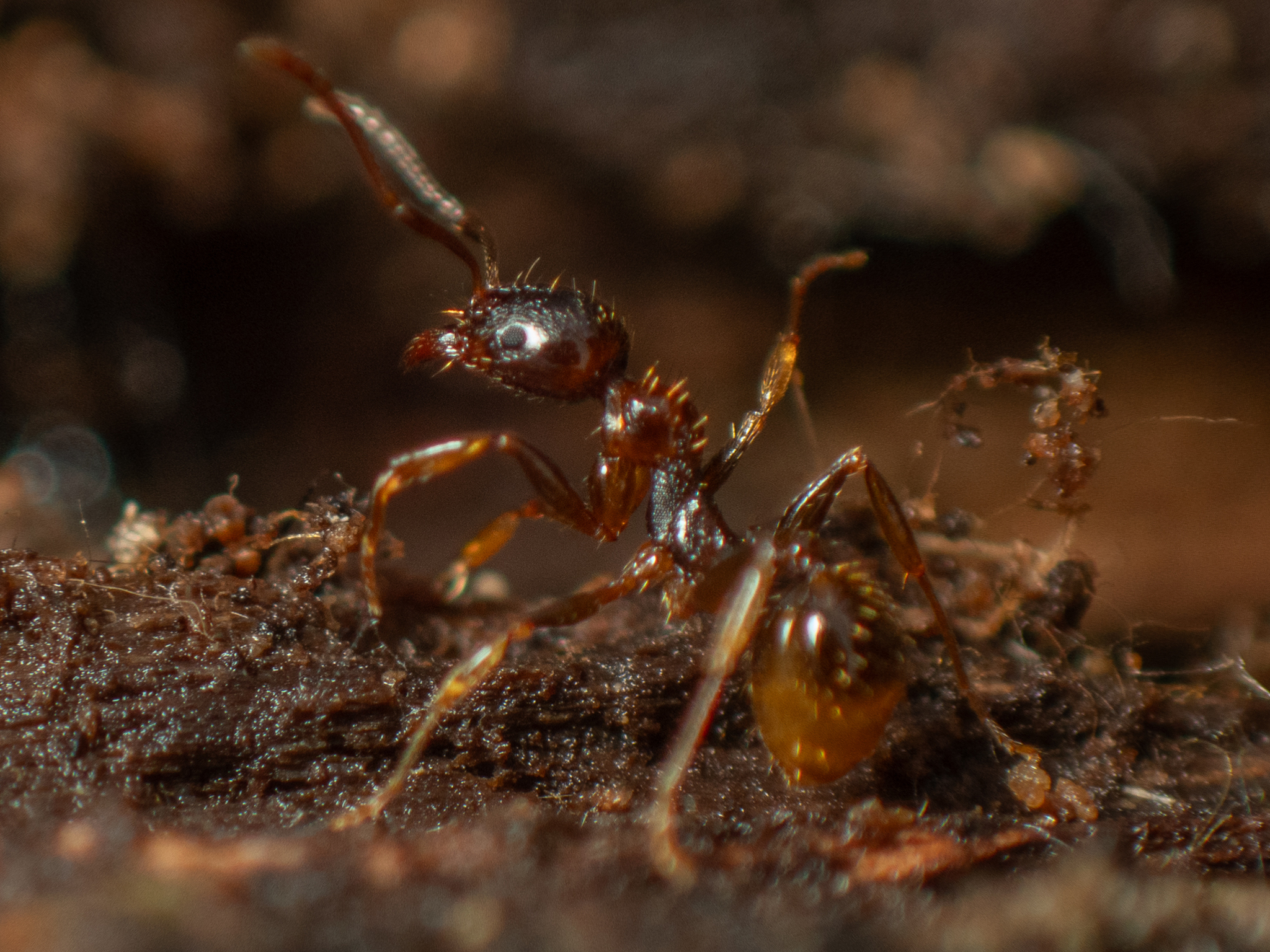
A. subterranea

- A. subterraneoides Emery, 1881
- A. swammerdami Forel, 1886
- A. syriaca Emery, 1908
- A. takahashii Wheeler, 1930
- A. tennesseensis (Mayr, 1862)

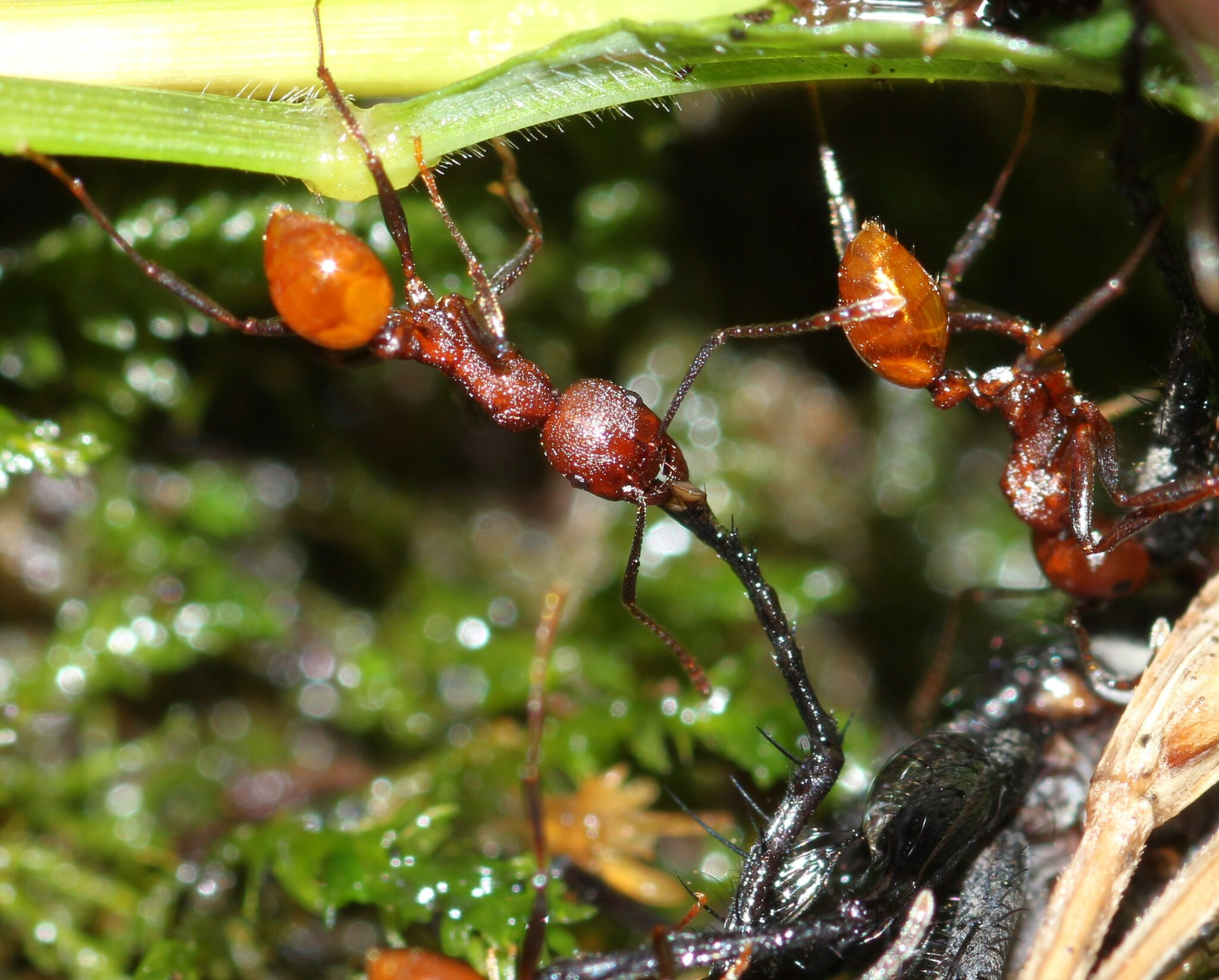
A. tennesseensis

- A. testaceopilosa (Lucas, 1849)
- A. texana Wheeler, 1915
- A. theryi Santschi, 1923
- A. tibetana Donisthorpe, 1929
- A. tinauti Cagniant, 1992
- A. tipuna Forel, 1913
- A. tokarainsulana Watanabe & Yamane, 1999
- A. torossiani Cagniant, 1988
- A. treatae Forel, 1886
- A. tristis Borowiec, Menchetti, Salata, Vila & Zięcina, 2024
- A. turkestanica Arnol'di, 1976
- A. uinta Wheeler, 1917
- A. ujhelyii Szabó, 1910
- A. umphreyi Deyrup & Davis, 1998
- A. wangtian Terayama, 2009
- A. wangye Terayama, 2009
- A. weigoldi Viehmeyer, 1922
- A. weulersseae Cagniant, 1989
- A. wilsoni Cagniant, 1988
- A. xuatian Terayama, 2009
