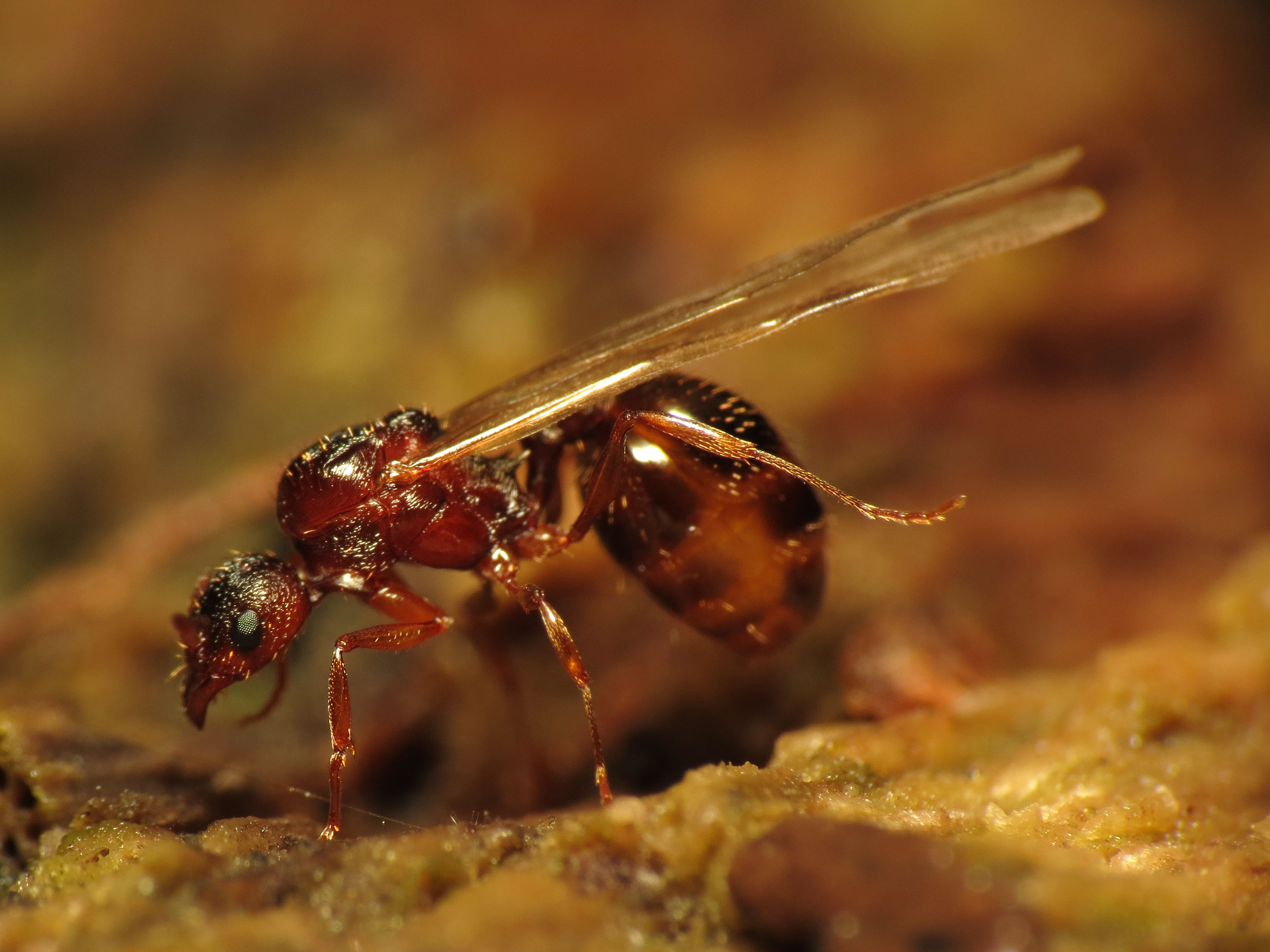

Scientific classification
- Domain: Eukaryota
- Kingdom: Animalia
- Phylum: Arthropoda
- Class: Insecta
- Order: Hymenoptera
- Family: Formicidae
- Subfamily: Myrmicinae
- Tribe: Stenammini
- Genus: Aphaenogaster
- Species: A. fulva

Binomial name
- Aphaenogaster fulva Roger, 1863

= Aphaenogaster fulva =

Species of ant

Aphaenogaster fulva is a species of ant in the family Formicidae.

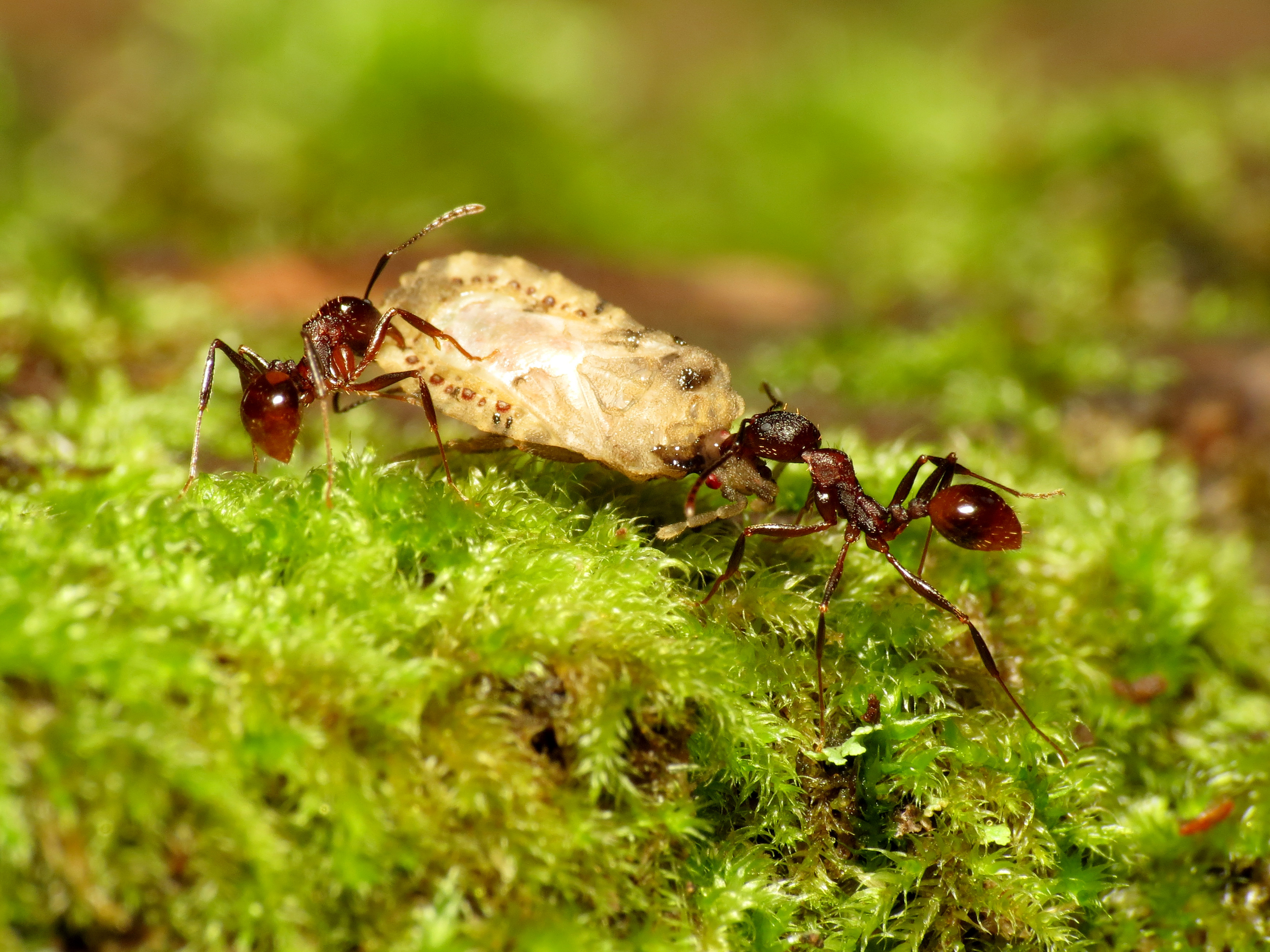

== Subspecies ==
These two subspecies belong to the species Aphaenogaster fulva:

- Aphaenogaster fulva azteca Enzmann, 1947^{i c g}
- Aphaenogaster fulva fulva Roger, 1863^{i c g}

Data sources: i = ITIS, c = Catalogue of Life, g = GBIF, b = Bugguide.net
