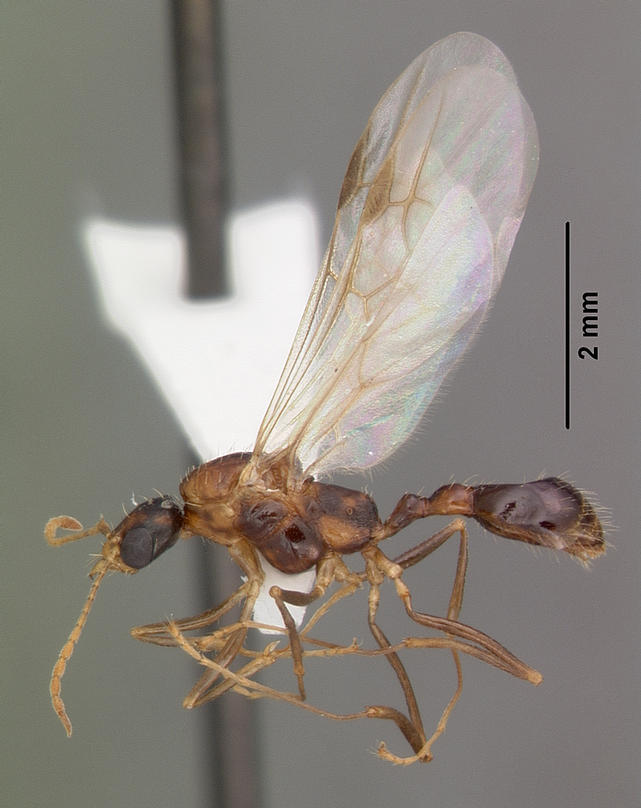
- Profile view of ant Aphaenogaster floridana specimen

Scientific classification
- Domain: Eukaryota
- Kingdom: Animalia
- Phylum: Arthropoda
- Class: Insecta
- Order: Hymenoptera
- Family: Formicidae
- Subfamily: Myrmicinae
- Tribe: Stenammini
- Genus: Aphaenogaster
- Species: A. floridana

Binomial name
- Aphaenogaster floridana Smith, 1941

= Aphaenogaster floridana =

Species of ant

Aphaenogaster floridana is a species of ant in the family Formicidae.
