= Aphaenogaster tristis =

Scientific classification
- Kingdom: Animalia
- Phylum: Arthropoda
- Clade: Pancrustacea
- Class: Insecta
- Order: Hymenoptera
- Family: Formicidae
- Subfamily: Myrmicinae
- Genus: Aphaenogaster
- Species: A. tristis

Binomial name
- Aphaenogaster tristis Borowiec, Menchetti, Salata, Vila & Zięcina, 2024

Species of ant

Aphaenogaster tristis is a species of myrmicine ant endemic to Greece.
