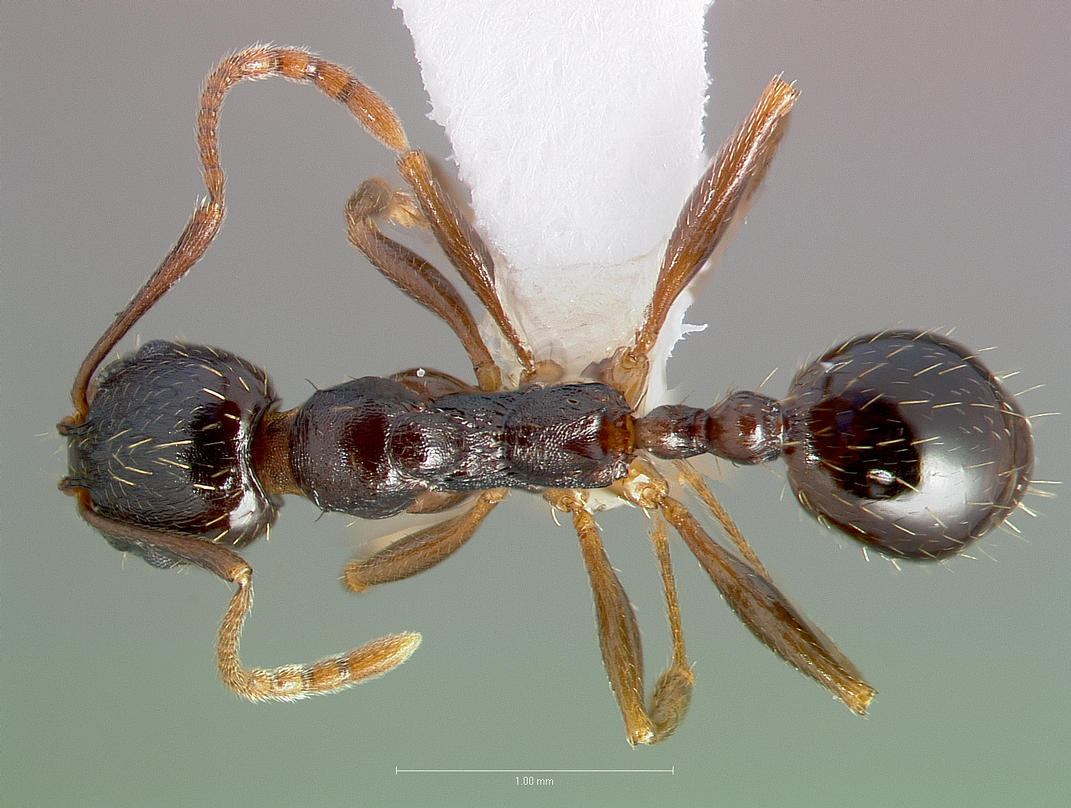

Scientific classification
- Domain: Eukaryota
- Kingdom: Animalia
- Phylum: Arthropoda
- Class: Insecta
- Order: Hymenoptera
- Family: Formicidae
- Subfamily: Myrmicinae
- Genus: Aphaenogaster
- Species: A. occidentalis

Binomial name
- Aphaenogaster occidentalis (Emery, 1895)

= Aphaenogaster occidentalis =

Species of ant

Aphaenogaster occidentalis is a species of ant in the family Formicidae.

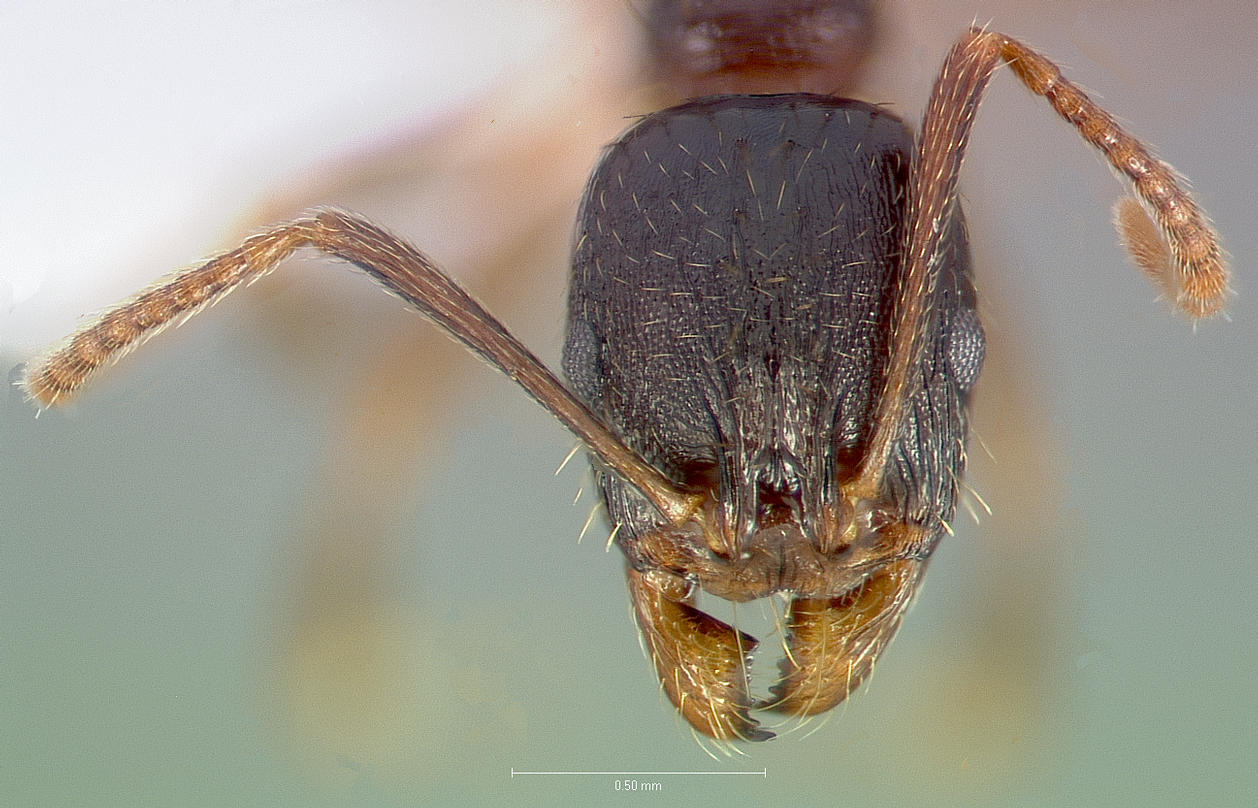

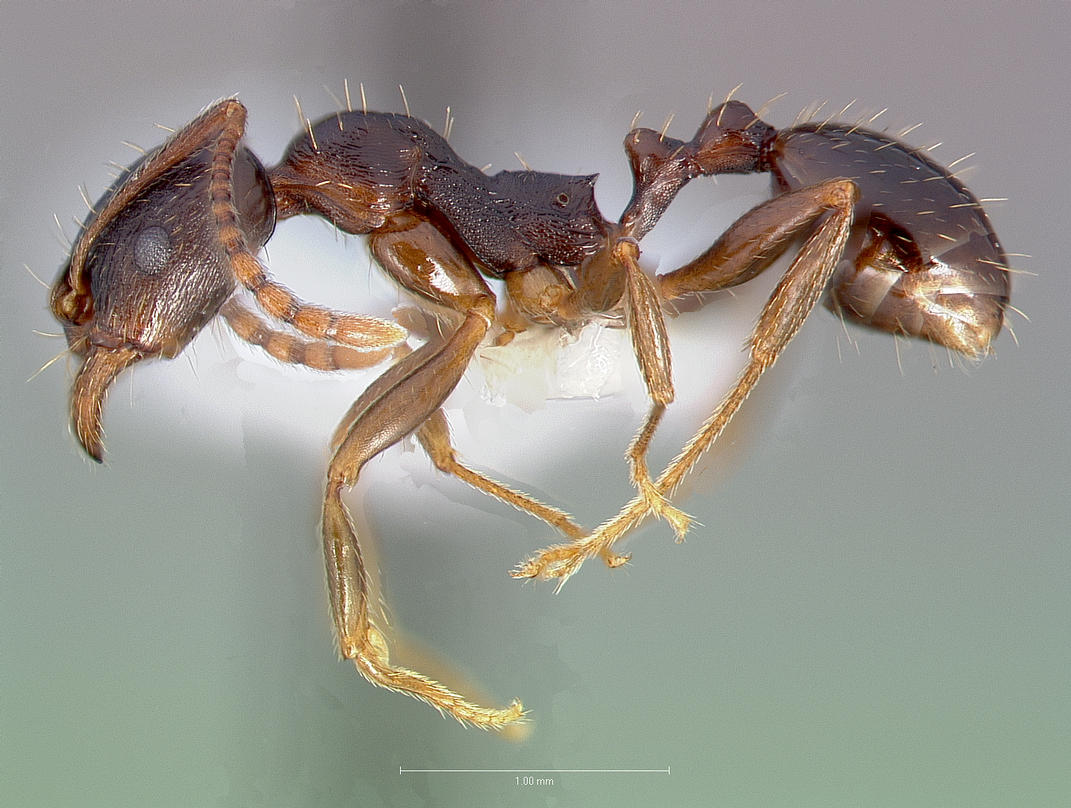
