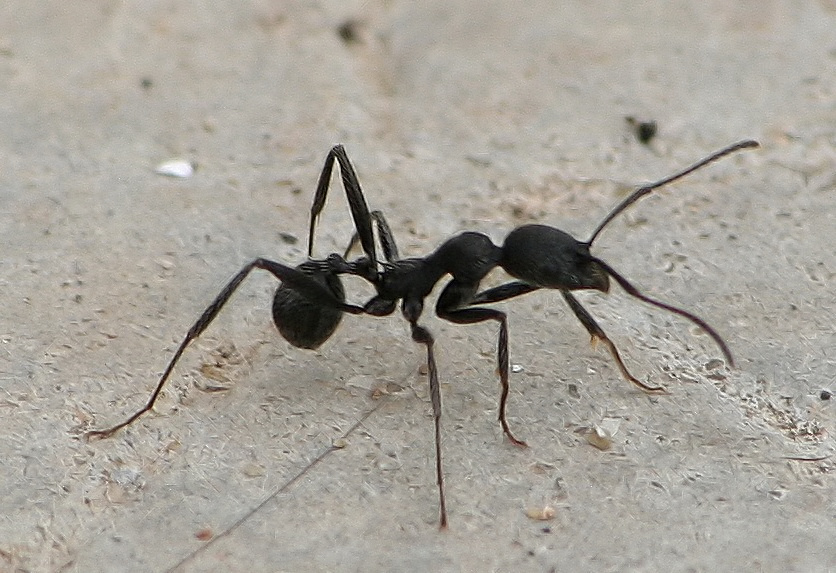

Scientific classification
- Kingdom: Animalia
- Phylum: Arthropoda
- Clade: Pancrustacea
- Class: Insecta
- Order: Hymenoptera
- Family: Formicidae
- Subfamily: Myrmicinae
- Tribe: Stenammini
- Genus: Aphaenogaster
- Species: A. senilis

Binomial name
- Aphaenogaster senilis Mayr, 1853

= Aphaenogaster senilis =

Species of insect

Aphaenogaster senilis is a species of ant in the family Formicidae native to the western Mediterranean Basin and the Canary Islands.

== Description ==
It is a monogynous and monomorphic species, about 5 to 7 mm (0.20 to 0.28 in) long. Its color is black, dull in appearance. Despite being considered a monomorphic species, it is possible to observe some variation in the size of the workers. It has light hair throughout the body. The thorax has a pair of short spines. The queen has vestigial wings, which do not perform any flight function. It is an omnivorous species, being frequent to find pieces of arthropods, seeds, snail shells, bones of small animals and pieces of garbage, next to the anthills.

The ants are diurnal, aggressive and inactive in the coldest months of the year, and spotted in shady areas in the warmer months.

== Distribution and habitat ==
Aphaenogaster senilis is distributed throughout the western Mediterranean, from the southern Mediterranean coast of France and Sardinia, to the Canary Islands and Morocco. It is especially prevalent on the Iberian Peninsula (excluding the north). It has been introduced to the Azores.

It inhabits humid undergrowth areas, as well as in areas highly altered by humans, such as car parks or gardens in urban centers.
