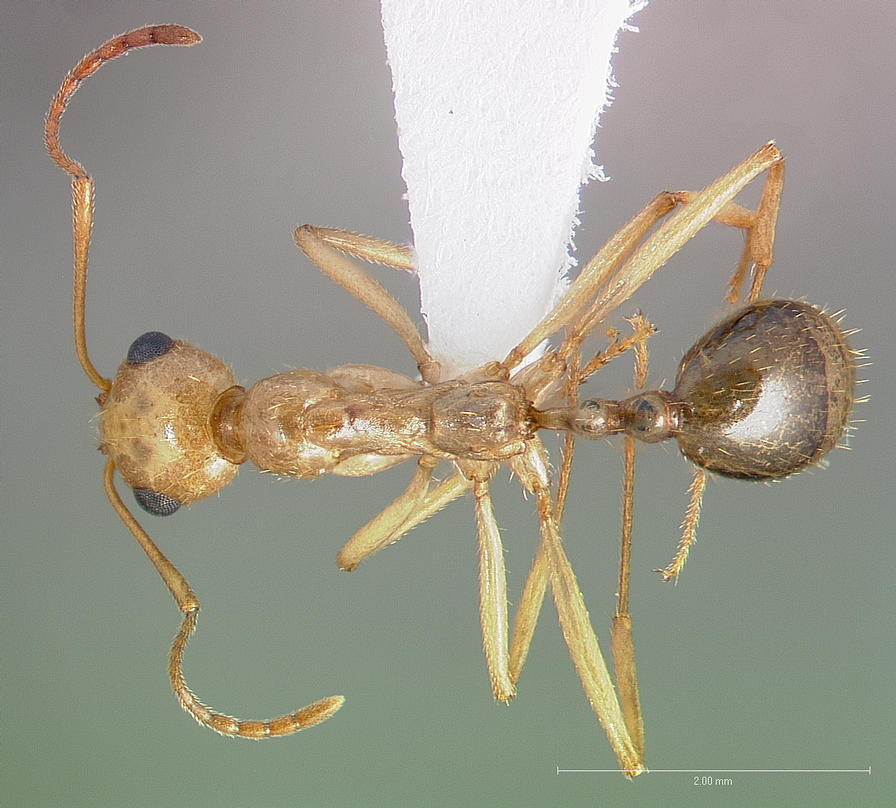

Scientific classification
- Domain: Eukaryota
- Kingdom: Animalia
- Phylum: Arthropoda
- Class: Insecta
- Order: Hymenoptera
- Family: Formicidae
- Subfamily: Myrmicinae
- Tribe: Stenammini
- Genus: Aphaenogaster
- Species: A. megommata

Binomial name
- Aphaenogaster megommata Smith, 1963
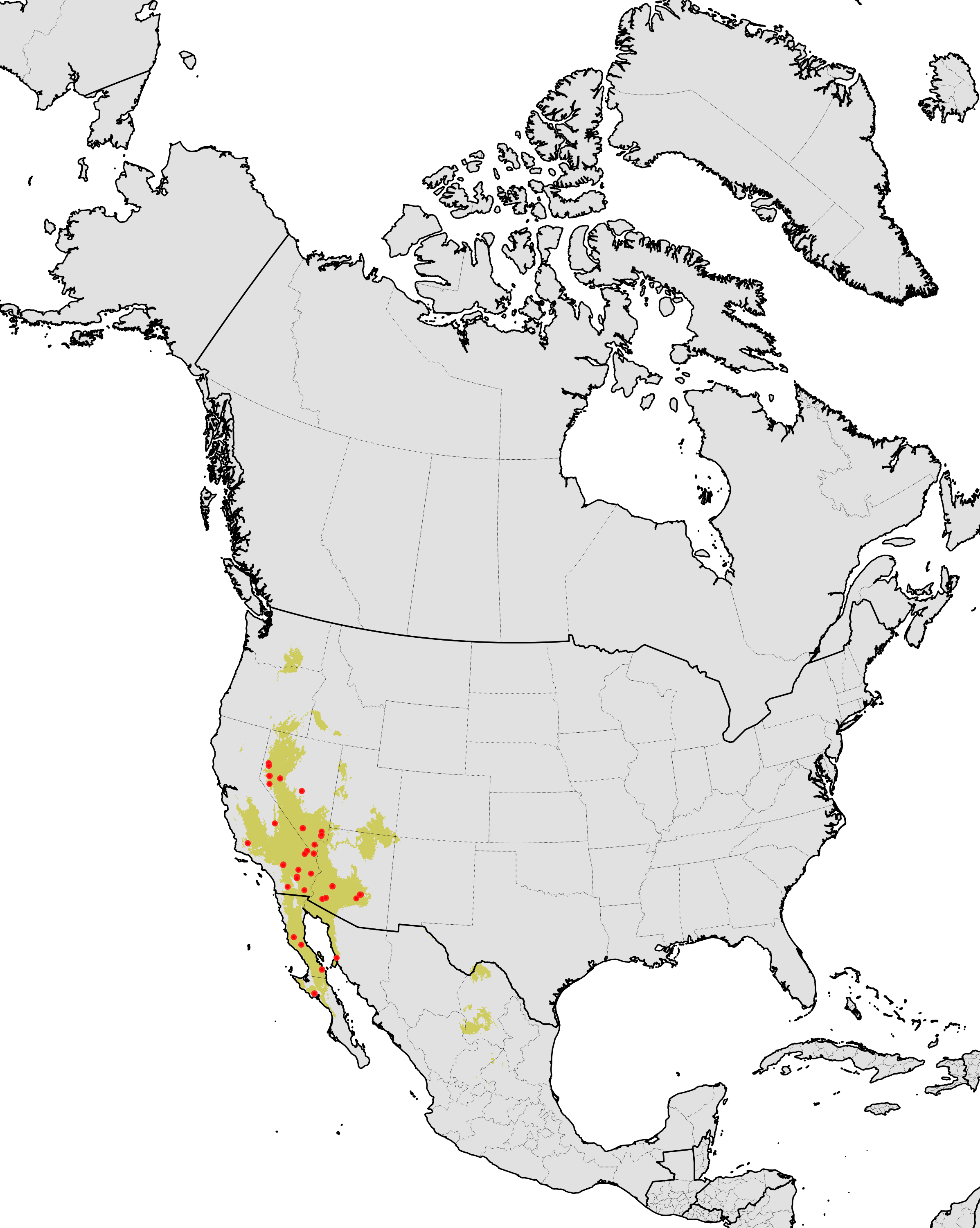
- ● occurrence data

= Aphaenogaster megommata =

Species of ant

Aphaenogaster megommata is a species of ant in the family Formicidae.

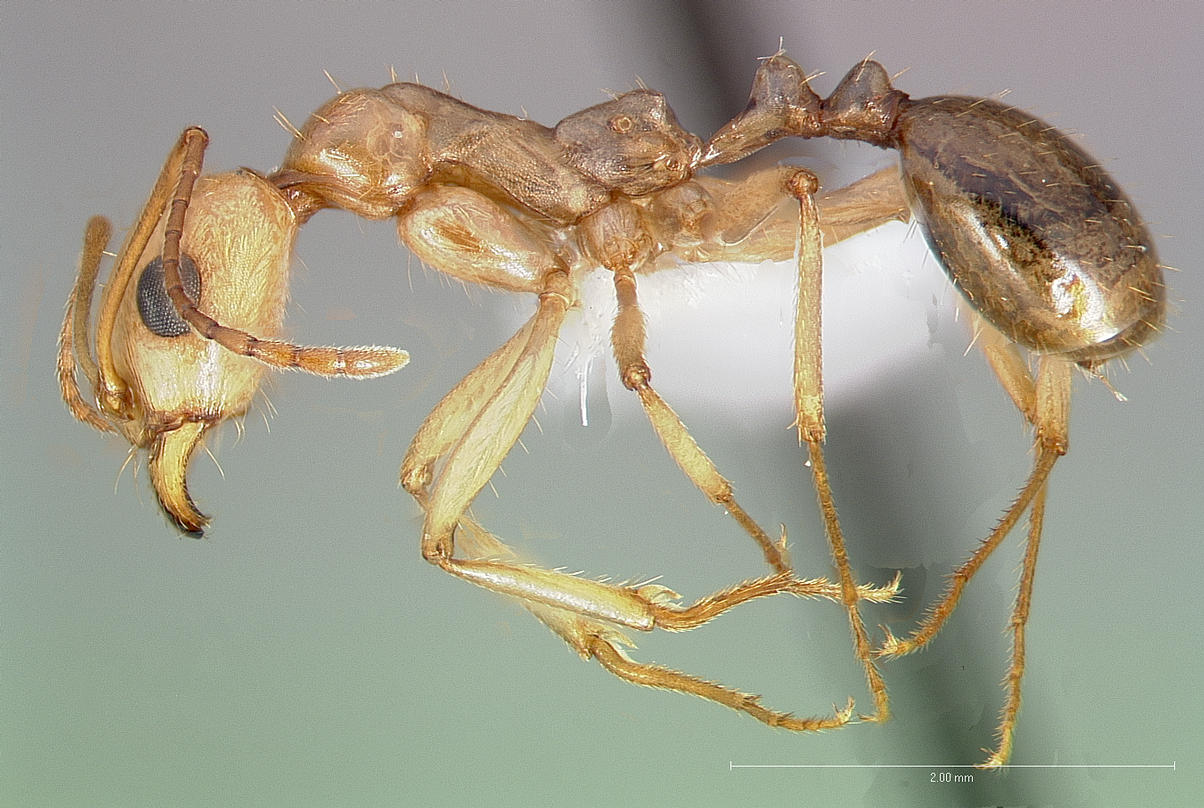
