= Aphaenogaster beccarii =

Scientific classification
- Kingdom: Animalia
- Phylum: Arthropoda
- Clade: Pancrustacea
- Class: Insecta
- Order: Hymenoptera
- Family: Formicidae
- Subfamily: Myrmicinae
- Genus: Aphaenogaster
- Species: A. beccarii

Binomial name
- Aphaenogaster beccarii Emery, 1887

Species of ant

Aphaenogaster beccarii is an Asian species of ant in the subfamily Myrmicinae found from Indonesia, India, Nicobar Islands, and China.
