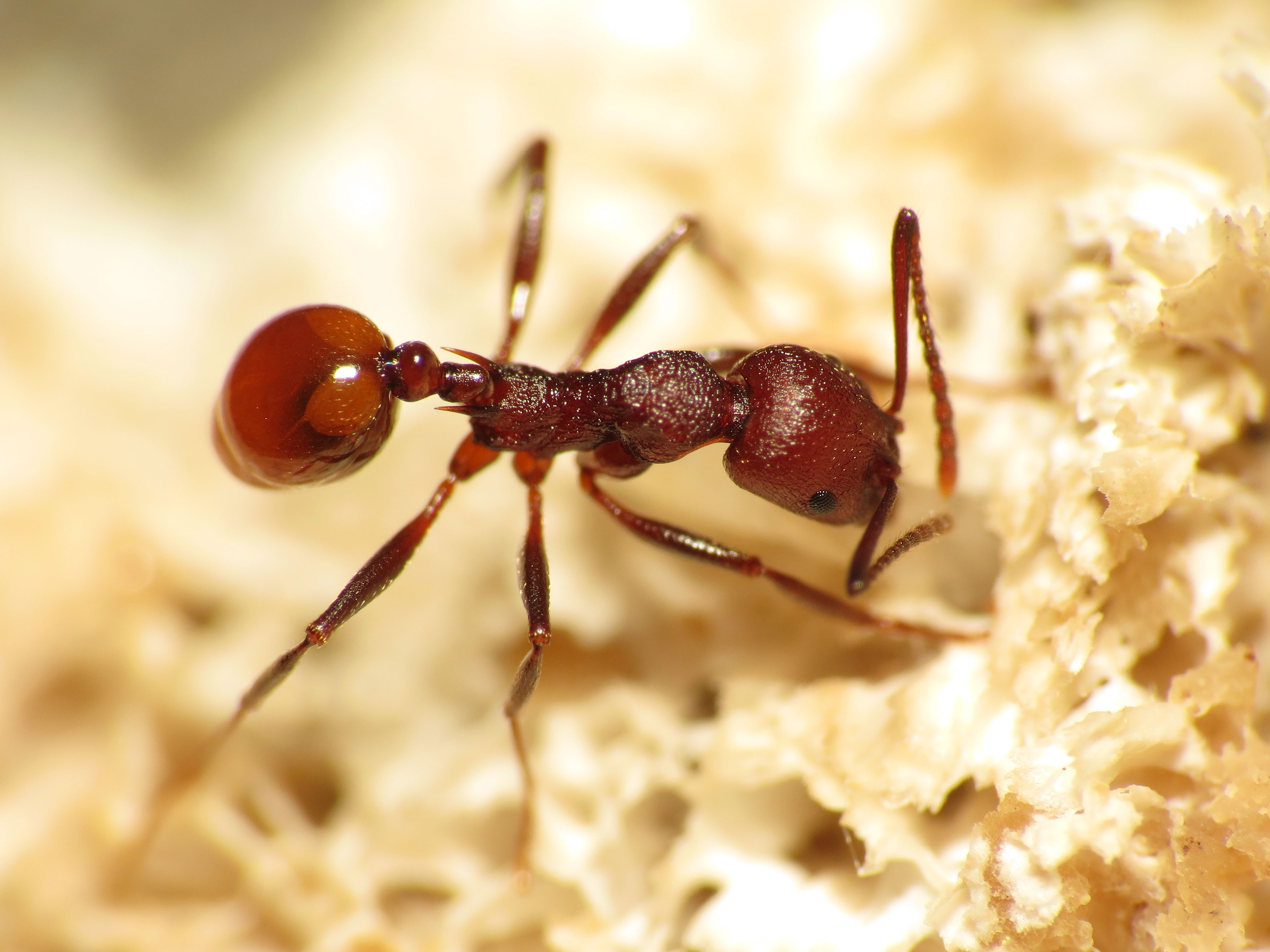

Scientific classification
- Domain: Eukaryota
- Kingdom: Animalia
- Phylum: Arthropoda
- Class: Insecta
- Order: Hymenoptera
- Family: Formicidae
- Subfamily: Myrmicinae
- Genus: Aphaenogaster
- Species: A. tennesseensis

Binomial name
- Aphaenogaster tennesseensis (Mayr, 1862)

= Aphaenogaster tennesseensis =

Species of ant

Aphaenogaster tennesseensis is a species of ant in the family Formicidae.

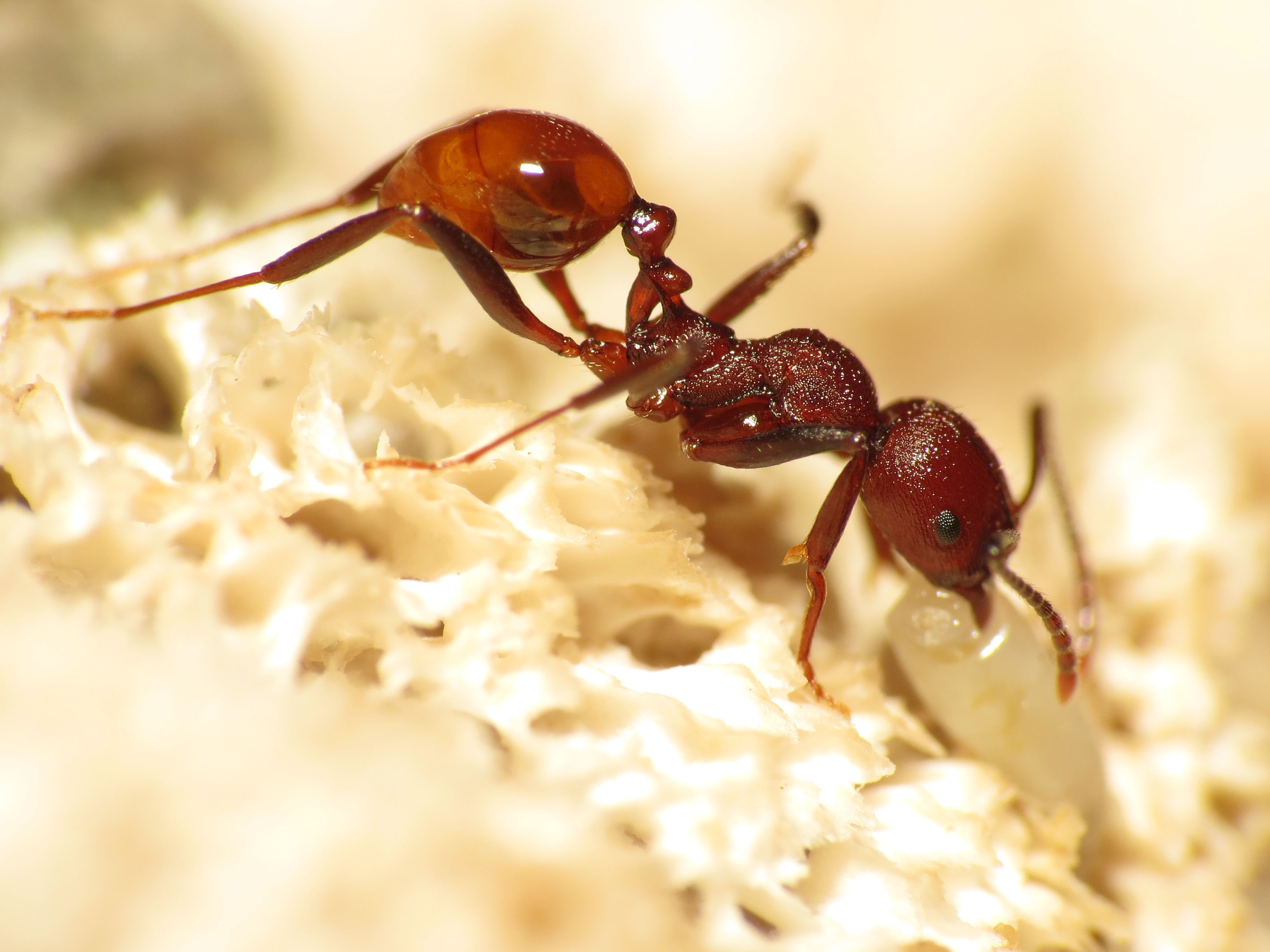
