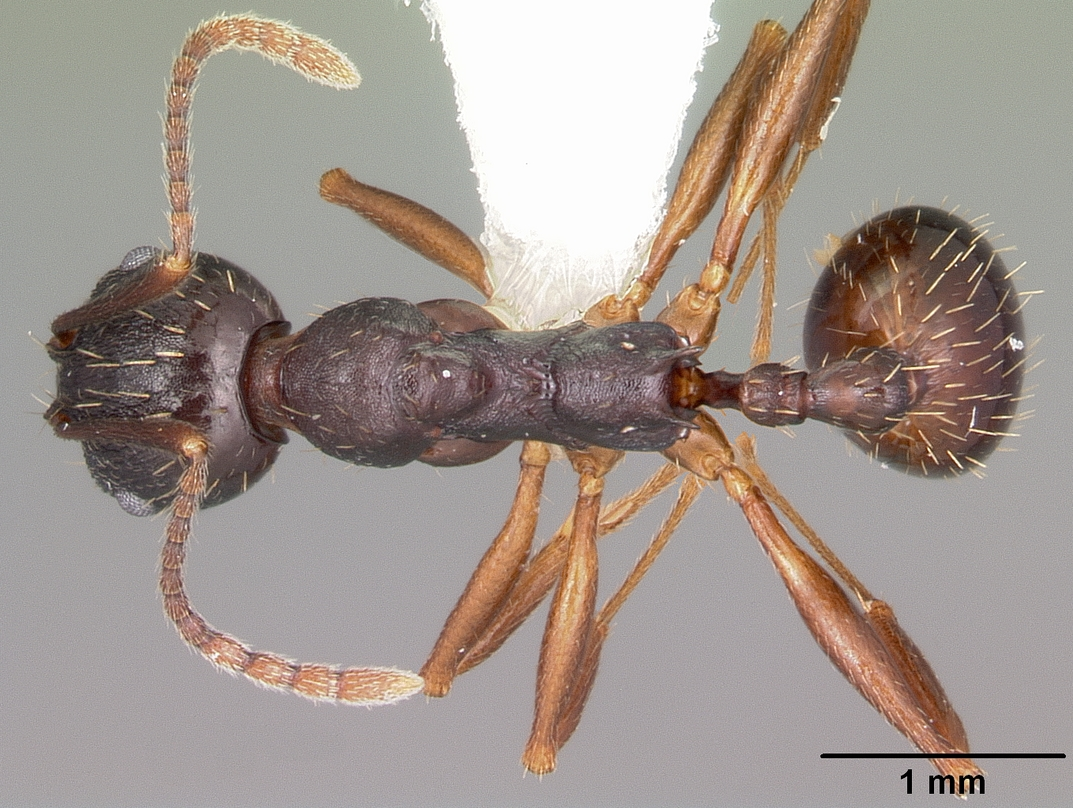

Scientific classification
- Domain: Eukaryota
- Kingdom: Animalia
- Phylum: Arthropoda
- Class: Insecta
- Order: Hymenoptera
- Family: Formicidae
- Subfamily: Myrmicinae
- Tribe: Stenammini
- Genus: Aphaenogaster
- Species: A. picea

Binomial name
- Aphaenogaster picea (Wheeler, 1908)

= Aphaenogaster picea =

Species of ant

Aphaenogaster picea is a species of ant in the family Formicidae.

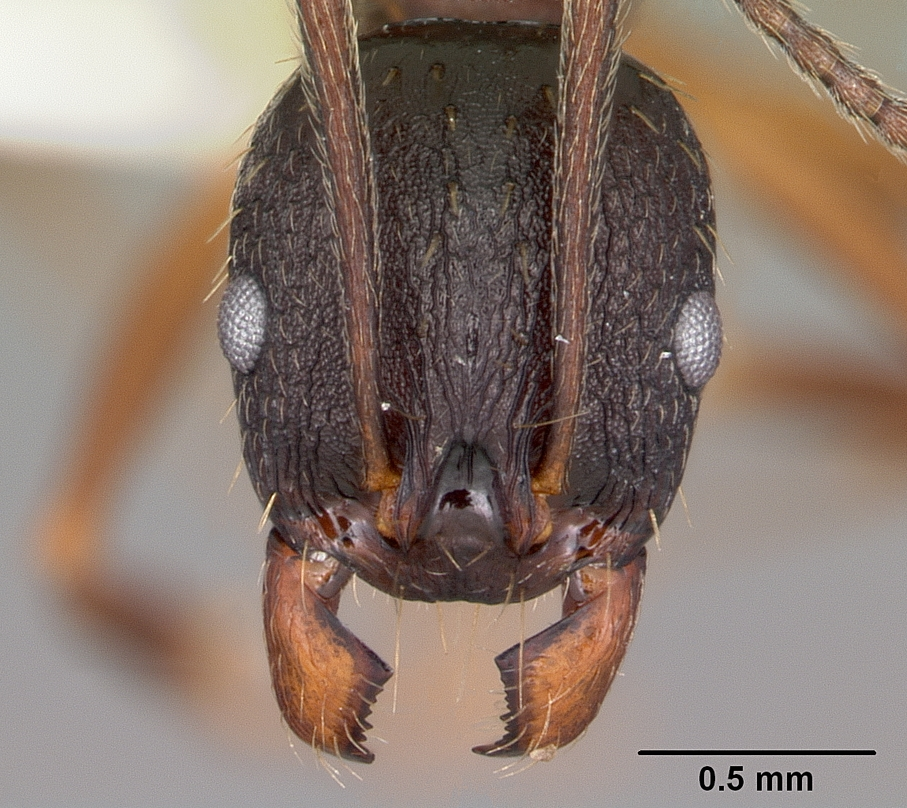

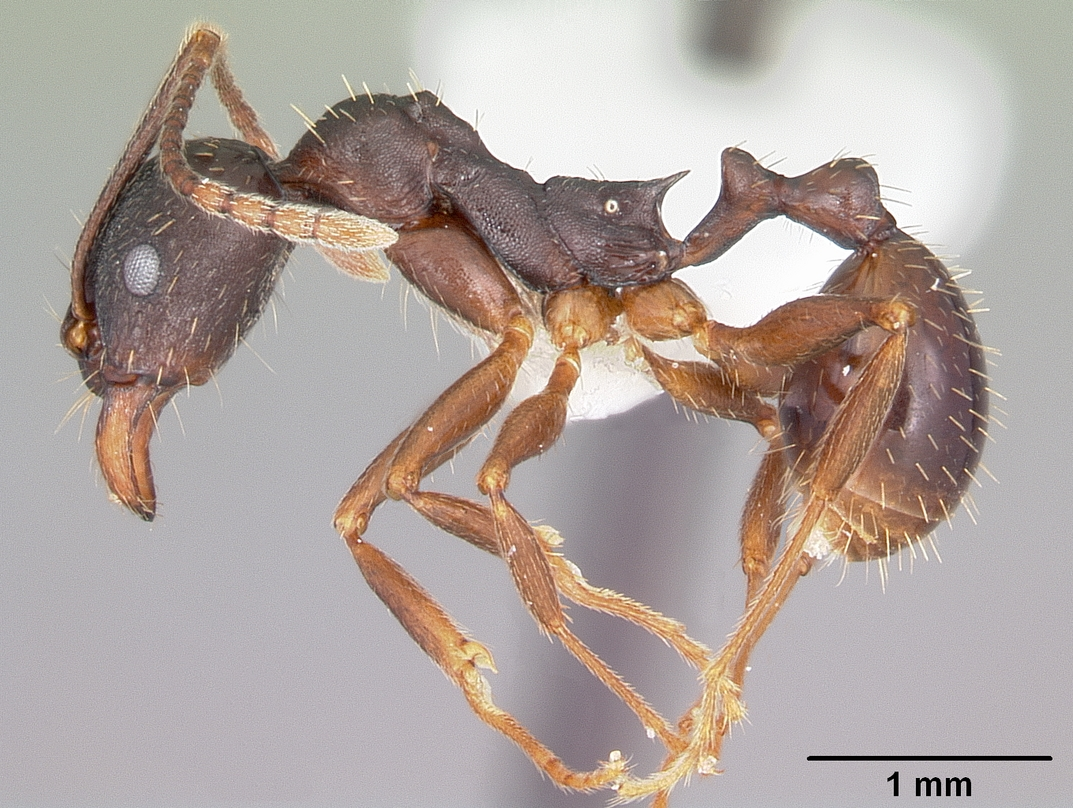

== Subspecies ==
These two subspecies belong to the species Aphaenogaster picea:

- Aphaenogaster picea picea (Wheeler, 1908)^{i c g}
- Aphaenogaster picea rudis Enzmann, 1947^{i c g}

Data sources: i = ITIS, c = Catalogue of Life, g = GBIF, b = Bugguide.net
