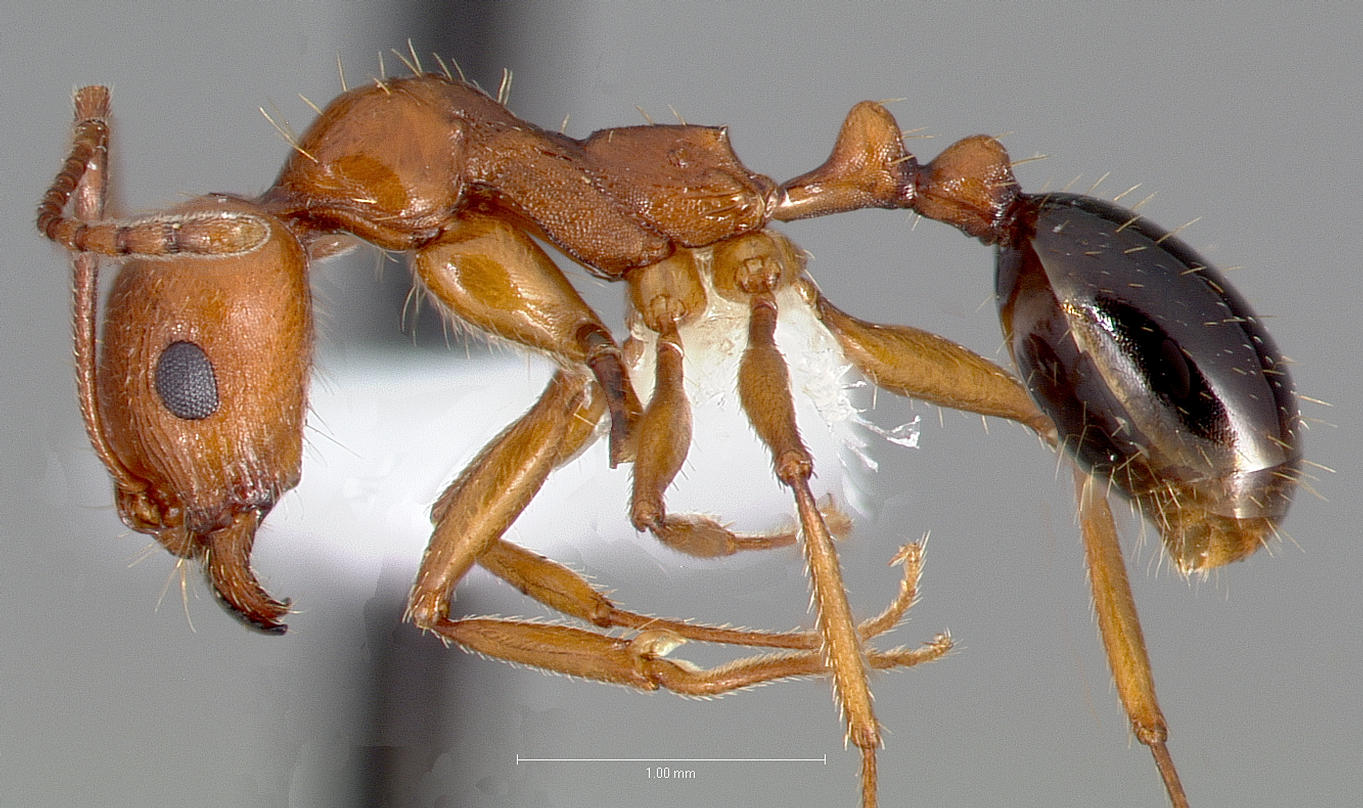
- Aphaenogaster uinta profile view

Scientific classification
- Kingdom: Animalia
- Phylum: Arthropoda
- Clade: Pancrustacea
- Class: Insecta
- Order: Hymenoptera
- Family: Formicidae
- Subfamily: Myrmicinae
- Genus: Aphaenogaster
- Species: A. uinta

Binomial name
- Aphaenogaster uinta Wheeler, 1917

= Aphaenogaster uinta =

Species of ant

Aphaenogaster uinta is a species of myrmicine ant native to the western United States and possibly Saskatchewan.

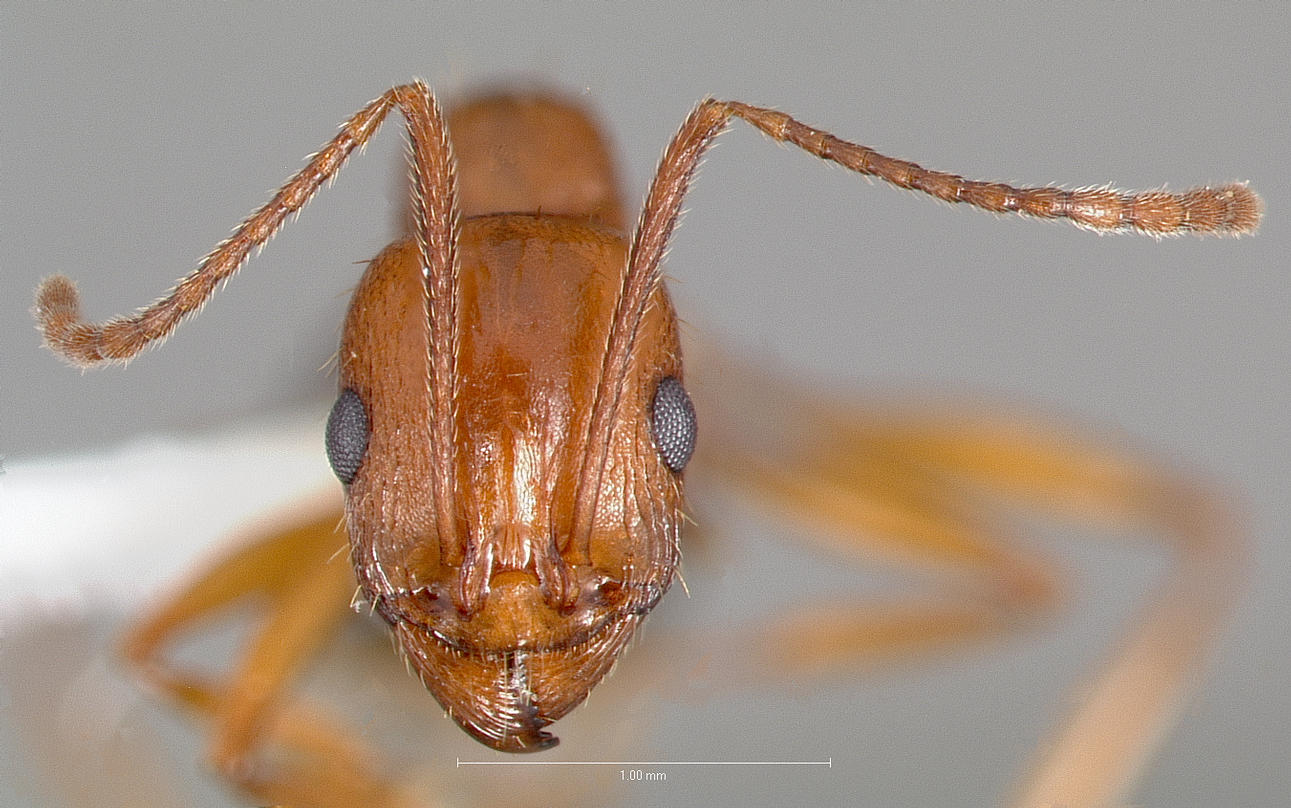

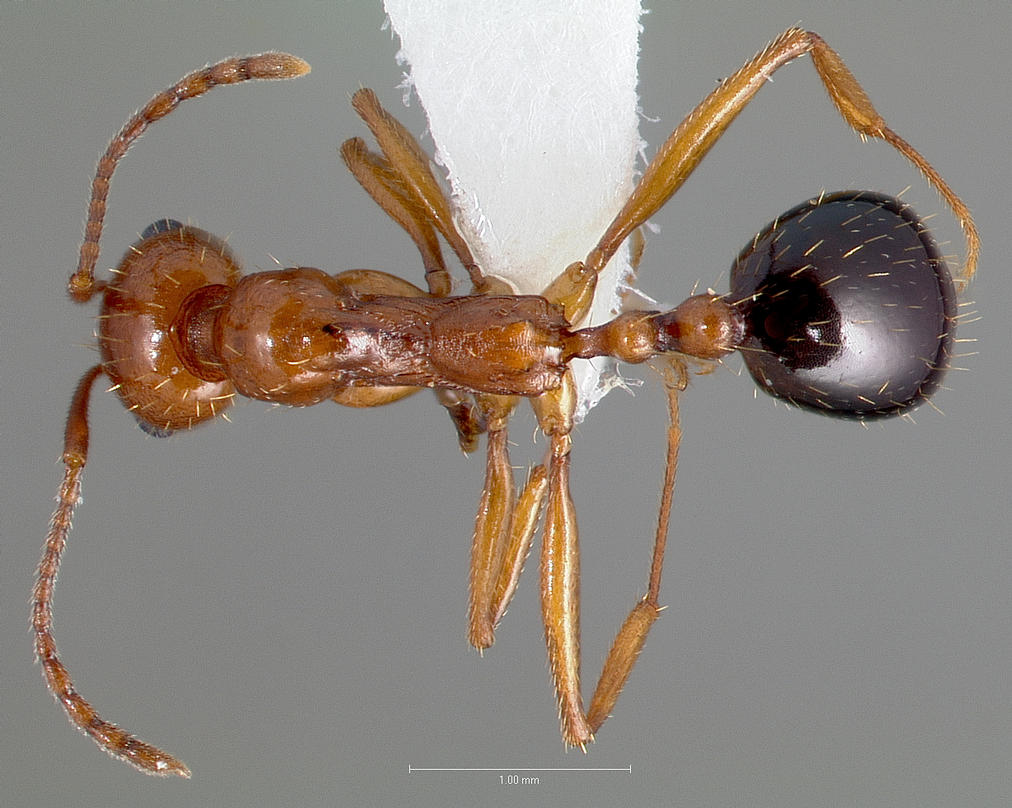
