= Aphaenogaster reichelae =

Scientific classification
- Domain: Eukaryota
- Kingdom: Animalia
- Phylum: Arthropoda
- Class: Insecta
- Order: Hymenoptera
- Family: Formicidae
- Subfamily: Myrmicinae
- Genus: Aphaenogaster
- Species: A. reichelae

Binomial name
- Aphaenogaster reichelae Shattuck, 2008

Species of ant

Aphaenogaster reichelae is a species of ant discovered and described by S. O. Shattuck in 2008.
