= Aphaenogaster mediterrae =

Scientific classification
- Domain: Eukaryota
- Kingdom: Animalia
- Phylum: Arthropoda
- Class: Insecta
- Order: Hymenoptera
- Family: Formicidae
- Subfamily: Myrmicinae
- Genus: Aphaenogaster
- Species: A. mediterrae

Binomial name
- Aphaenogaster mediterrae Shattuck, 2008

Species of ant

Aphaenogaster mediterrae has been discovered and described by S. O. Shattuck in 2008.
