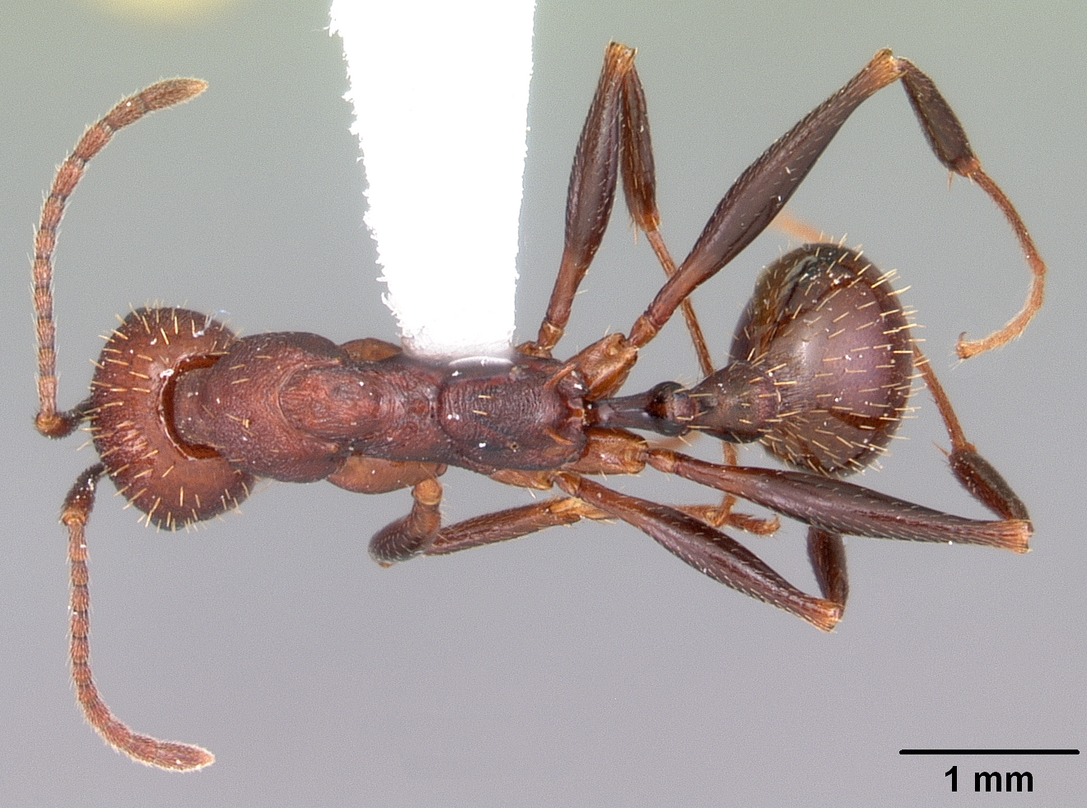

Scientific classification
- Domain: Eukaryota
- Kingdom: Animalia
- Phylum: Arthropoda
- Class: Insecta
- Order: Hymenoptera
- Family: Formicidae
- Subfamily: Myrmicinae
- Genus: Aphaenogaster
- Species: A. lamellidens

Binomial name
- Aphaenogaster lamellidens Mayr, 1886

= Aphaenogaster lamellidens =

Species of ant

Aphaenogaster lamellidens is a species of ant in the family Formicidae.

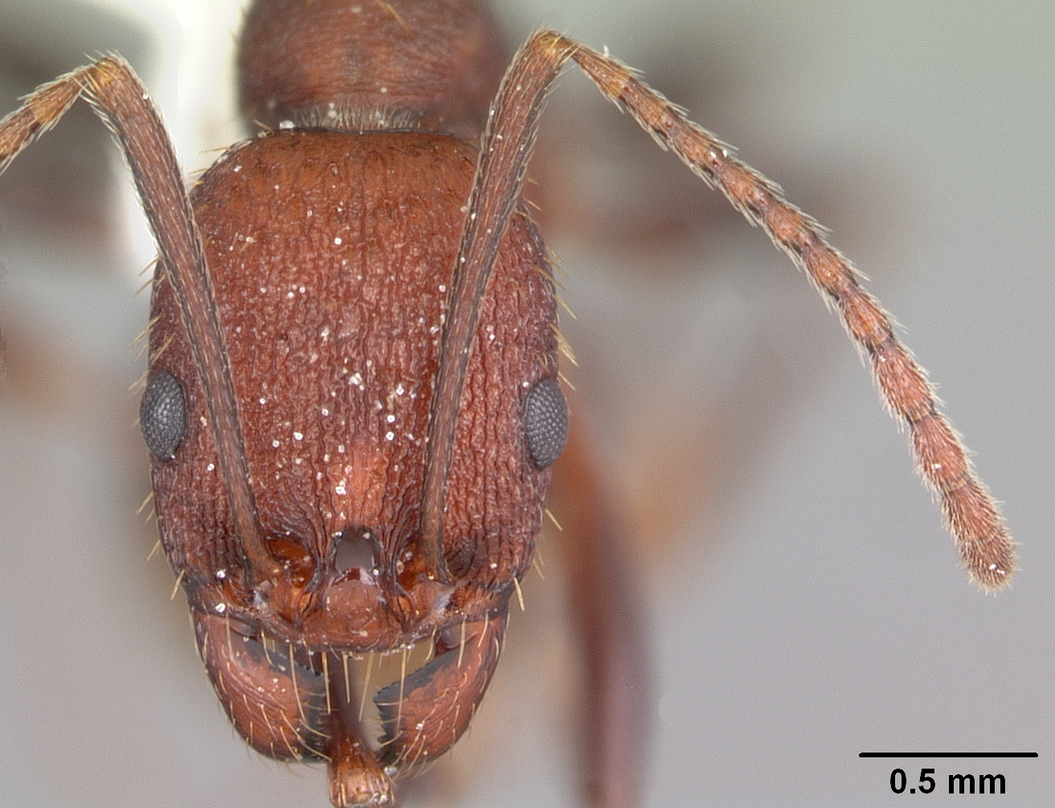

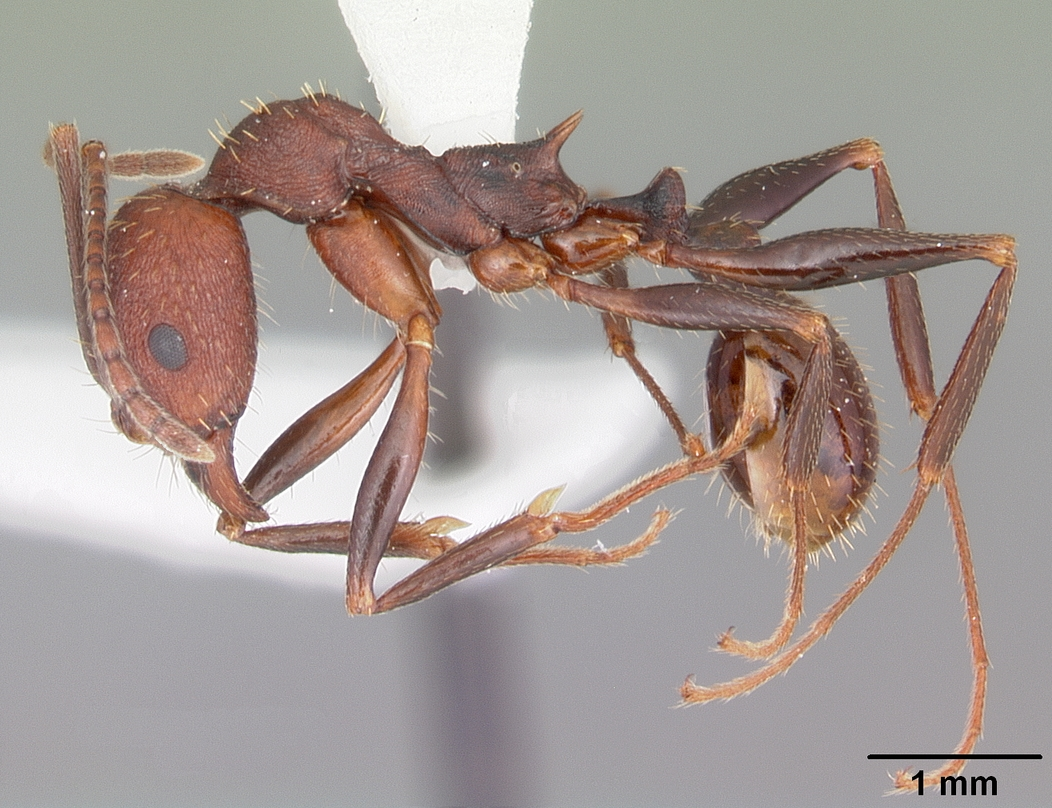
