= Aphaenogaster kimberleyensis =

Scientific classification
- Domain: Eukaryota
- Kingdom: Animalia
- Phylum: Arthropoda
- Class: Insecta
- Order: Hymenoptera
- Family: Formicidae
- Subfamily: Myrmicinae
- Genus: Aphaenogaster
- Species: A. kimberleyensis

Binomial name
- Aphaenogaster kimberleyensis Shattuck, 2008

Species of ant

Aphaenogaster kimberleyensis has been discovered and described by Shattuck, S. O. in 2008.
