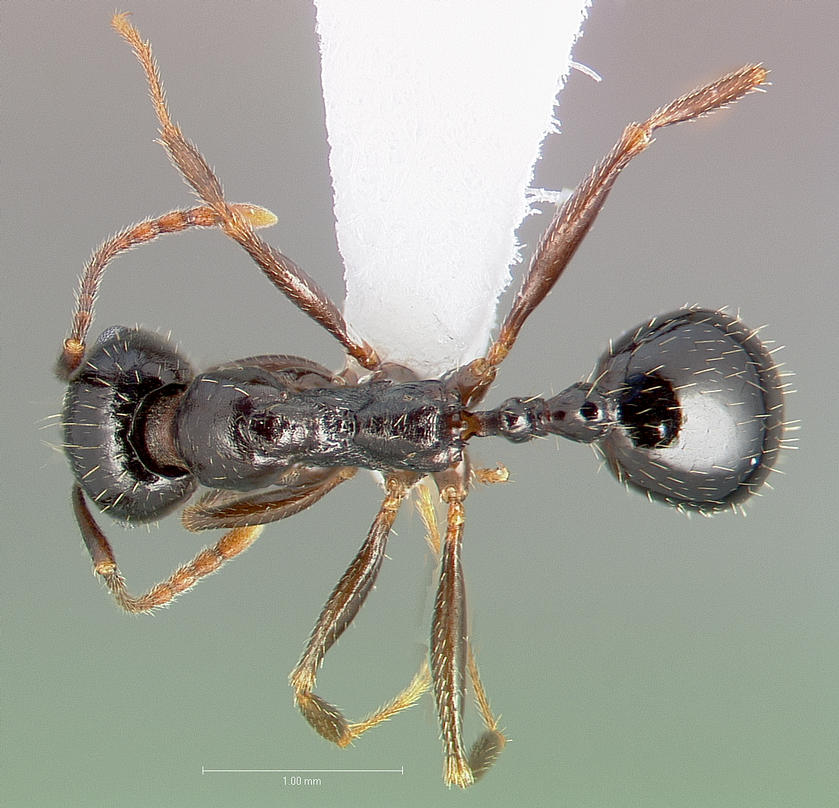

Scientific classification
- Kingdom: Animalia
- Phylum: Arthropoda
- Class: Insecta
- Order: Hymenoptera
- Family: Formicidae
- Subfamily: Myrmicinae
- Genus: Aphaenogaster
- Species: A. patruelis

Binomial name
- Aphaenogaster patruelis Forel, 1886

= Aphaenogaster patruelis =

Species of ant

Aphaenogaster patruelis is a species of ant in the family Formicidae.

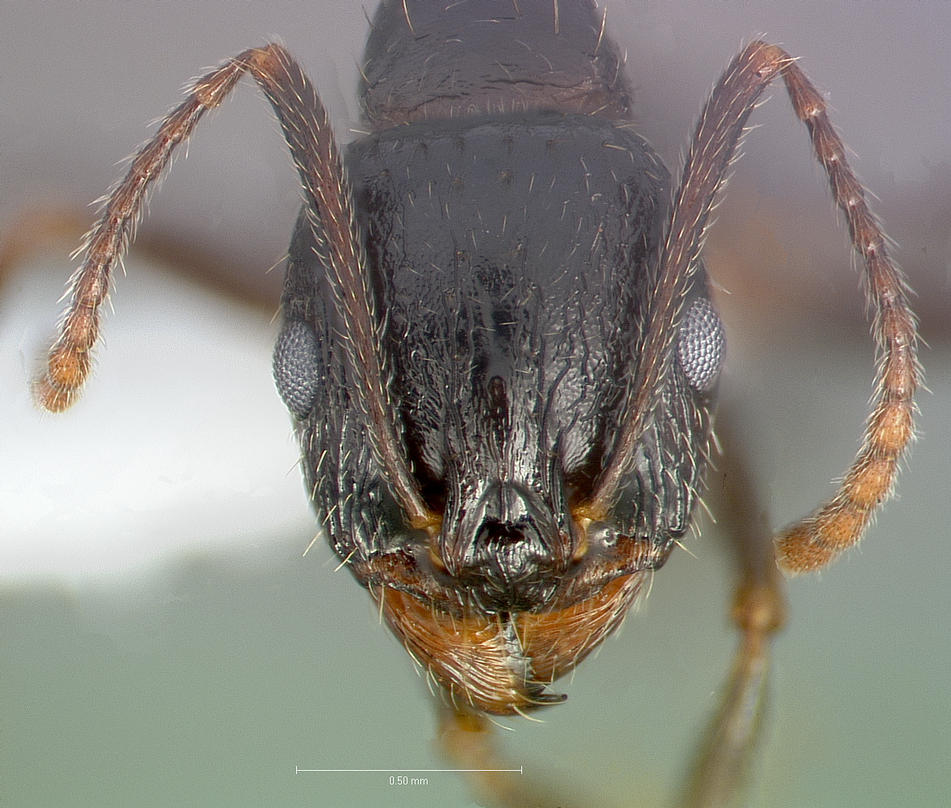

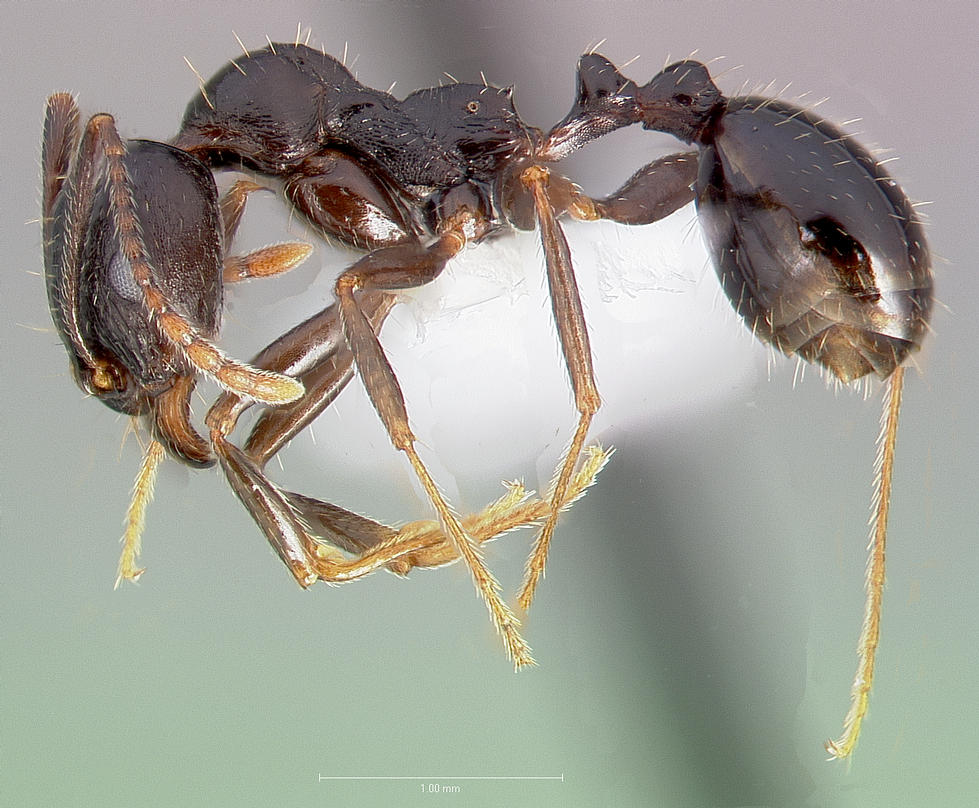

== Subspecies ==
These two subspecies belong to the species Aphaenogaster patruelis:

- Aphaenogaster patruelis carbonaria Pergande, 1894^{i c g}
- Aphaenogaster patruelis patruelis Forel, 1886^{i c g}

Data sources: i = ITIS, c = Catalogue of Life, g = GBIF, b = Bugguide.net It plays an important role in soil aeration and seed dispersal in temperate forest ecosystems. Studies have shown that species in this genus contribute significantly to nutrient cycling by transporting seeds and organic material underground.
