= Aphaenogaster avita =

Aphaenogaster avita Temporal range: Middle Miocene

Scientific classification
- Domain: Eukaryota
- Kingdom: Animalia
- Phylum: Arthropoda
- Class: Insecta
- Order: Hymenoptera
- Family: Formicidae
- Subfamily: Myrmicinae
- Genus: Aphaenogaster
- Species: †A. avita

Binomial name
- †Aphaenogaster avita Fujiyama, 1970

Extinct species of ant

Aphaenogaster avita is an extinct species of ant in the subfamily Myrmicinae known from a solitary early to middle Miocene fossil found in Japan. At the time of description A. praerelicta was one of twelve Aphaenogaster species to have been described from fossils and the only fossil species from Japan.

== History and classification ==
Aphaenogaster avita is known from a solitary fossil insect which is a compression-impression fossil preserved in a layer of soft diatomite. Along with several other insect fossils, the A. avita specimen was collected in 1969 from layers of the early to middle Miocene Chojabaru Formation. The formation is composed of diatomites, sandstones and mudstones with the insects recovered from the upper and middle sections. The formation outcrops in a small area on Cape Chojabaru on the eastern side of Iki Island, and the flora of the formation is notably similar to that of Daijima flora, which is noted to be Middle Miocene in age.

The fossil ant was first studied by paleoentomologist Ienori Fujiyama of the National Museum of Nature and Science in Tokyo. Fujiyama's 1970 type description of the new species was published in the Japanese journal Memoirs of the Natural Science Museum, Tokyo. The etymology for the specific epithet avita was not given with the type description. When first described the species was placed by Fujiyama into the Aphaenogaster subgenus "Deromyrma", however in the time since the type description, "Deromyrma" has been subsumed into Aphaenogaster as a junior synonym and is no longer in use.

== Description ==
The Aphaenogaster avita specimen is a partially preserved queen caste adult which was fossilized with its underside facing upwards and the body turned slightly sideways. The specimen has wings attached, a poorly preserved head and is missing its abdomen, making gender determination hard. The head has an estimated length of 2.9 millimetres (0.11 in) and the thorax is estimated at 4.8 millimetres (0.19 in) with distinct longitudinal striations on it. The preserved forewing is 11 millimetres (0.43 in) long and has a maximum width of 4.5 millimetres (0.18 in). The wing venation shows a narrow costal cell and a thin stigma. The wing shows a reduced cubital vein, with a notable bend, and forming an elongated cubital cell with the median vein.
