= Aphaenogaster praerelicta =

Aphaenogaster praerelicta Temporal range: Late Oligocene - early Miocene

Scientific classification
- Domain: Eukaryota
- Kingdom: Animalia
- Phylum: Arthropoda
- Class: Insecta
- Order: Hymenoptera
- Family: Formicidae
- Subfamily: Myrmicinae
- Genus: Aphaenogaster
- Species: †A. praerelicta

Binomial name
- †Aphaenogaster praerelicta De Andrade, 1995

Extinct species of ant

Aphaenogaster praerelicta is an extinct species of ant in the subfamily Myrmicinae known from a solitary Late Oligocene to Early Miocene fossil found in Mexico. At the time of description A. praerelicta was one of three Aphaenogaster species known from Mexico.

== History and classification ==
Aphaenogaster praerelicta is known from a solitary fossil insect which is an inclusion in a transparent chunk of Mexican amber along with three flies, two springtails, a wasp, and some pollen grains. Mexican amber is recovered from fossil bearing rocks in the Simojovel region of Chiapas, Mexico. The amber dates from between 22.5 million years old, representing the youngest sediments of the Balumtun Sandstone, and the 26 million year old La Quinta Formation. This age range straddles the boundary between the Late Oligocene and Early Miocene and is complicated by both formations being secondary deposits for the amber: the age range represents only the youngest that it might be. The amber was produced by either of two extinct Hymenaea species, Hymenaea mexicana or Hymenaea allendis, both of which were initially described from fossil flowers included in Mexican amber. The fossil is part of the amber collection of George Poinar Jr., which at the time of description, was housed at the University of California, Berkeley.

The fossil ant was first studied by paleoentomologist Maria De Andrade of the University of Basel. De Andrade's 1995 type description of the new species was published in the German journal Stuttgarter Beiträge zur Naturkunde. Serie B (Geologie und Paläontologie). The specific epithet praerelicta is a combination of the Latin "prae" meaning before and "relicta", the species name for the modern Aphaenogaster relicta of Haiti, to which A. praerelicta is most similar. A. praerelicta is one of two species described by De Andrade in the 1995 paper: the other species Aphaenogaster amphioceanica was found in Dominican amber. Three l species of Aphaenogaster are currently known from Mexico, the fossil A. praerelicta, A. ensifera and A. mexicana.

== Description ==
The Aphaenogaster praerelicta specimen is a well-preserved worker caste adult with an estimated body length of approximately 6.28 millimetres (0.247 in). The overall coloration of A. praerelicta is a brown tone, with the legs and posterior borders of the tergites shading slightly lighter. The body has numerous long thick hairs which range from fully erect to lying down against the exoskeleton. The head widens towards the posterior edge and lacks the "neck" which is seen in A. amphioceanica. While the hollows where the antennae were attached to the head capsule are small, the antennae of A. praerelicta are unknown, as they were lost before the specimen was entombed. The head capsule has numerous deep anatomizing ridges over which a strong reticulation is superimposed. The propodeum is notable in having two spines 0.6 millimetres (0.024 in) long that point upwards and backwards and another set of spines at the humeral angle closer to the head. The combination of no "neck", short humeral spines and long posterior spines on the propodeum are unique. The character combination is similar to that of several modern North American species and A. relicta of Hati.
