= Aneuretellus =

Aneuretellus Temporal range: Middle Eocene

Scientific classification
- Kingdom: Animalia
- Phylum: Arthropoda
- Clade: Pancrustacea
- Class: Insecta
- Order: Hymenoptera
- Family: Formicidae
- Subfamily: Aneuretinae
- Tribe: Aneuretini
- Genus: †Aneuretellus; Dlussky, 1988
- Species: †A. deformis

Binomial name
- †Aneuretellus deformis Dlussky, 1988

Genus of ants

Aneuretellus is an extinct genus of ant in the formicid subfamily Aneuretinae, and is one of eight genera of the subfamily. The genus contains a single described species Aneuretellus deformis and is known from one Middle Eocene fossil which was found in Sakhalin in the Russian Far East.

== History and classification ==
When first described, A. deformis was known from a single fossil insect included in a transparent chunk of Sakhalin amber. When the fossil was described it was part of the amber collections housed in the Paleontological Institute of the Russian Academy of Sciences. The amber was recovered from fossil bearing rocks in the Sakhalin region of Eastern Russia. Sakhalin amber is noted for having undergone high temperatures and pressures after the resin was buried. As a result insects and other inclusions in the amber are not as well preserved as those of other amber locations, even those of older ambers. The inclusions are most of the time carbonized reducing fine detail preservation, and the amber has been subjected to plastic deformation changing the shapes and features of the inclusions. The distortion is visible in the outlines of trapped air bubbles, which are elongated along the plane of distortion, rather than spherical as seen with bubbles in Eocene Baltic amber and Cretaceous Taymyr amber. In some cases the inclusions are at least partially filled with amber rather than being hollow.

Sakhalin amber has been attributed a range of geological ages, with Vladimir Zherikhin in 1978 suggesting dates between 59 and 47 million years old. In 1988, Gennady Dlussky suggested a tentative Paleocene age, which was followed by subsequent authors through 2013. However research published in 1999 on the Naibuchi Formation, in which Sakhalin amber is directly preserved, gives a Middle Eocene age based on geological and paleobotanical context. The Sakhalin amber forest had a variety of plants living in a mixed coastal swamp, river, and lake environment. The river and lake system had numerous swampy areas that resulted in active peat bog formation. The bogs were surrounded by Osmunda, Nymphaeaceae and Ericaceae plants, while Taxodium, Alnus, Salix, and other trees populated the forest.

The amber fossil was first studied by paleoentomologist Gennady Dlussky of the Russian Academy of Sciences, with his 1988 type description for the species published in Paleontologicheskii Zhurnal. The species name deformis was coined from the Latin word meaning "deformed". The etymology of the genus name Aneuretellus was not explained by Dlussky.

Based on the structure of the petiole and shape of the gaster, Dlussky placed A. deformis into the ant subfamily Aneuretinae. The subfamily includes three additional extinct genera, Mianeuretus, Paraneuretus, and Protaneuretus, and a single living genus and species Aneuretus simoni, found in Sri Lanka.

== Description ==
The lone worker of Aneuretellus has a body length of 3 mm (0.12 in), a head length of 0.61 mm (0.024 in) and antennae with twelve segments. The head is generally trapezoid in shape, with a notably convex rear margin. The antennae have a basal segment, that does not reach past the occipital margin, eleven additional segments, the last three of which are enlarged and form a terminal club. The eyes are shifted forward on the head, while the funicular segments, those between the scape and club, are thickened. Both are features seen in ant species that typically soil or leaf litter dwelling. Due to positioning of the worker in the amber, two of the important features distinguishing the subfamily Aneuretinae genera are not directly visible. An elongated one segmented petiole is indicated by the lower impression of the petiole in the amber, though the upper portion of the petiole along with the upper portion of the mesosoma after the pronotum are missing from the specimen. Though the junction of the petiole with the gaster is missing, the lower impression of the petiole shows it was probably widening at the junction.
