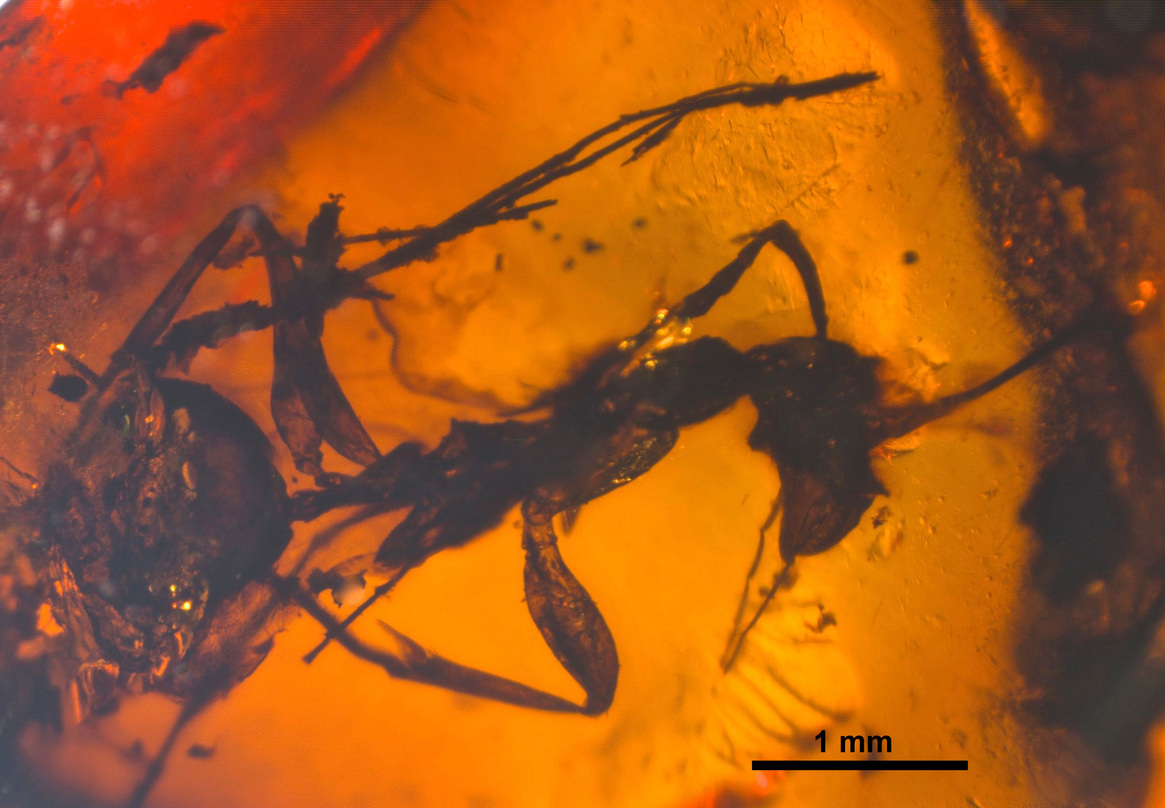
- Z. horribilis holotype specimen

Scientific classification
- Kingdom: Animalia
- Phylum: Arthropoda
- Clade: Pancrustacea
- Class: Insecta
- Order: Hymenoptera
- Family: Formicidae
- Subfamily: Dolichoderinae
- Tribe: incertae sedis
- Genus: †Zherichinius; Dlussky, 1988

Species
- Zherichinius horribilis; Zherichinius rapax

= Zherichinius =

Zherichinius Temporal range: Middle Eocene

Genus of ants

Zherichinius is an extinct genus of ants in the subfamily Dolichoderinae known from fossils found in amber from the Middle Eocene of Sakhalin island Far eastern Russia and Bitterfeld, Germany. At the time of description the species Zherichinius horribilis and Zherichinius rapax were two of eight ant species known from Sakhalin fossils.

== History and classification ==
Zherichinius is known from two complete adult female fossils, the holotype specimens numbers PIN3387-35 and PIN3387-37, along with the partial legs of a third specimen in the same amber piece as PIN3387-35 and a poorly preserved worker, PIN3387-36, which was not described. At the time of the genus description all three specimens were residing in the Paleontological Institute, Russian Academy of Sciences, in Moscow. Both described specimens are worker caste adults preserved as inclusions in transparent chunks of Sakhalin amber. The amber specimen was recovered from deposits on Sakhalin island, in far eastern Russia during a 1972 collecting expedition. The expedition recovered amber from the beaches of the Okhotsk Sea at the mouth of the Naiba River and upstream on the banks of the river eroding out of exposures of Naibuchi Formation strata. One additional fossil has been reported from Bitterfeld amber, and has been listed by Dlussky and Rasnitsyn 2009 as undescribed.

Sakhalin amber is noted for having undergone high temperatures and pressures after the resin was buried. As a result, insects and other inclusions in the amber are not as well preserved as those of other amber locations, even those of older ambers. The inclusions are most of the time carbonized reducing fine detail preservation, and the amber has been subjected to plastic deformation changing the shapes and features of the inclusions. The distortion is visible in the outlines of trapped air bubbles, which are elongated along the plane of distortion, rather than spherical as seen with bubbles in Eocene Baltic amber and Cretaceous Taymyr amber. In some cases the inclusions are at least partially filled with amber rather than being hollow. Sakhalin amber has been attributed a range of geological ages, with Vladimir Zherikhin in 1978 suggesting dates between 59 and 47 million years old. In 1988, Gennady Dlussky suggested a tentative Paleocene age, which was followed by subsequent authors through 2013. However research published in 1999 on the Naibuchi Formation, in which Sakhalin amber is directly preserved, gives a Middle Eocene age based on geological and paleobotanical context. The Sakhalin amber forest had a variety of plants living in a mixed coastal swamp, river, and lake environment. The river and lake system had numerous swampy areas that resulted in active peat bog formation. The bogs were surrounded by Osmunda, Nymphaeaceae and Ericaceae plants, while Taxodium, Alnus, Salix, and other trees populated the forest.

Bitterfeld amber is recovered from coal deposits in the Saxony area of Germany and the dating of the deposits is uncertain. Bitterfeld represents a section of the Eocene Paratethys Sea, and the amber that is recovered from the region is thought to be redeposited from older sediments. The fossil record of Bitterfeld and Baltic amber insects is very similar with a number of shared species, and that similarity is noted in the suggestions of a single source for the paleoforest that produced the amber.

The Sakhalin amber fossils were first studied by paleoentomologist Gennady Dlussky of the Russian Academy of Sciences, with his 1988 type description for the genus, and species published in the Paleontologicheskii Zhurnal. The genus name was coined as a patronym honoring the Russian paleoentomologist and coleopterist Vladimir Zherikhin, who had died in 2001, and was often called a "living encyclopedia" by friends due to his knowledge and memory. The genus name was used for the base of Dlussky's proposed tribe Zherichiniini, erected for the genus. The species name horribilis was derived from the Latin word meaning "terrible", and the species name rapax is from the Latin meaning "predatory".

The tribe Zherichiniini was recognized by Dlussky, but subsequent authors did not recognize it, rather they placed the genus as incertae sedis within Dolichoderinae without a tribal placement.

Zherichinius is one of six genera and eight species described from Sakhalin amber. The dolichoderine species are most diverse with Z. horribilis, Z. rapax, Eotapinoma compacta and E. gracilis. Other ant subfamilies are represented by a single species each, the aneuretine Aneuretellus deformis, the formicine Chimaeromyrma brachycephala, the myrmicine Aphaenogaster dlusskyana, and the ponerine Protopone primigena.

== Description ==
Zherichinius species workers similar in proportion to Leptomyrmex species, but are distinguished from other members of Dolichoderinae based on the distinct deep notch along the rear margin of the head capsule and the scales on the petiole. The heads have fairly straight sides and are rectangular in outline, being between 1.3 and 2.2 times wider than long. There are no visible ocelli on the workers, but the compound eyes are well developed, large, and positioned near the center point on the head. The antennae are long with 12 segments, the scape being much longer than the head capsule, and the terminal segments not enlarged into a club.

=== Zherichinius horribilis ===
The worker is approximately 5 mm (0.20 in) long, with an antenna scape that is 1.5 mm (0.059 in) long. The wide mandibles have a large apical tooth along with several backward facing teeth along the chewing margin. Behind the mandibles the clypeus have a wavy to nearly straight front margin. The petiole is distinctly elongated to about three times its width. There are two pairs of defensive spines on the face and three pair on the rear margin of the head. Additionally there are single pairs on the pronotum and propodium.

=== Zherichinius rapax ===
The Z. rapax worker is smaller in proportions than Z. horribilis, with a total length of approximately 3 mm (0.12 in) and a scape that is 0.95 mm (0.037 in) long. At 2.2 greater in length then width, the head has a larger length to width proportion then Z. horribilis and the rear corners of the head capsule are drawn backwards distinctly. The mandibles are more elongated than Z. horribilis, with a large apical tooth and between seven and eight smaller teeth on each chewing margin, while the front margin of the clypeus angles forward. The legs are proportionally longer than those of Z. horribilis, while the petiole is shorter in proportion and there are no defensive spines present.
