= Monardia multiarticulata =

Scientific classification
- Domain: Eukaryota
- Kingdom: Animalia
- Phylum: Arthropoda
- Class: Insecta
- Order: Diptera
- Family: Cecidomyiidae
- Subfamily: Micromyinae
- Tribe: Micromyini
- Genus: Monardia
- Species: M. multiarticulata

Binomial name
- Monardia multiarticulata Felt, 1914

Species of fly

Monardia multiarticulata is a species of wood midges in the family Cecidomyiidae. It is known from North America and was described by American entomologist Ephraim Porter Felt in 1914.
