= Amediella =

Amediella may refer to:

- A genus of gall midges in the family Cecidomyiidae, Amediella (fly)
- A monotypic subgenus of lesser dung flies in the genus Minilimosina, with the single species Minilimosina endrodyi
