= Vladimir Zherikhin =

Russian evolutionary biologist (1945–2001)

Vladimir Vasilevich Zherikhin
- Владимир Васильевич Жерихин
- Born: July 22, 1945; Moscow, Russia
- Died: 21 December 2001 (aged 56)
- Other name: Volodya
- Education: Moscow State University, 1967
- Known for: Evolutionary biology
- Spouse: Irina Sinitshenkova
- Parents: Vasiliy Zherikhin (father); Aleksandra Zherikhin (mother)
- Scientific career
- Fields: Entomology, Palaeontology
- Workplaces: Paleontological Institute, Russian Academy of Sciences

Vladimir Vasilevich Zherikhin (Russian: Владимир Васильевич Жерихин, 22 July 1945 – 21 December 2001), of the Paleontological Institute, Russian Academy of Sciences, Moscow, was one of the world's leading paleoentomologists and coleopterists. He worked on the palaeontology of the Coleoptera (beetles) and of insects in general, and on the taxonomy of the weevils (Curculionoidea).

Zherikhin was one of the lead authors of the multi-authored monograph "Historical development of the class Insecta" edited by his long term collaborators Boris Rohdendorf and Alexandr Pavlovich Rasnitsyn, as well as the much expanded English language "History of Insects", to which he contributed chapters on the patterns of insect burial (taphonomy), past terrestrial ecology, trace fossils, and on thrips and praying mantids.

From 1970 Zherikhin organized field trips to collect fossil insects, and particularly those in Cretaceous and Palaeogene fossil resins, to northernmost Siberia (Taimyr Peninsula), the Russian Far East, and the Caucasus. The objective was to explore changes in the insect world around the Meso-Cenozoic boundary.

One of Zherikhin's most important collaborations was with his former student Vadim Gratshev. Together they produced numerous papers, most famously their seminal phylogenetic study on the hind wing venation of the weevils, published in a volume celebrating the 80th birthday of Roy Crowson.

== Eponymy ==
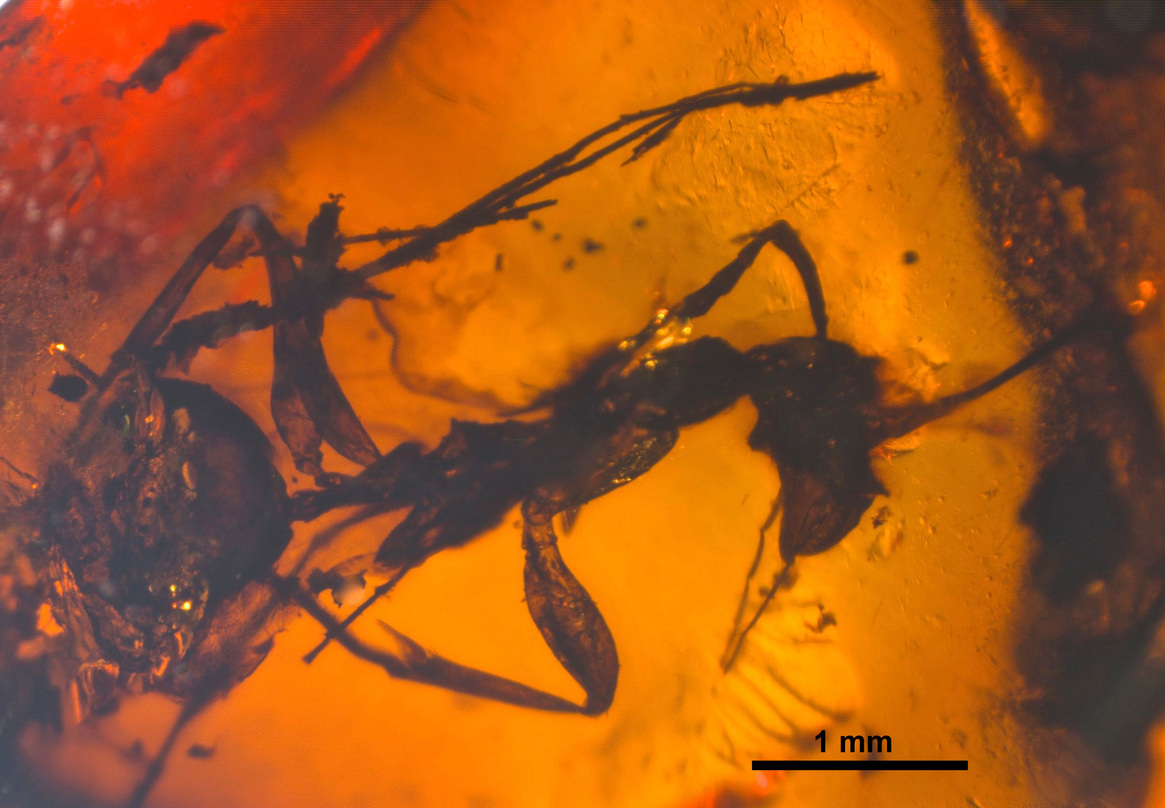
Zherichinius horribilis in Sakhalin amber A fossil ant

The following species or genera have been proposed in honor of Vladimir Zherikhin, († denotes extinct taxa):

- †Amgupteryx zherikhini Petrulevicius, Declos, & Nel, 2010
- †Anaglyphites zherikhini Soriano & Delclos, 2006
- †Annulaphis zherichini Shaposhnikov, 1979
- †Antefungivora zherikhini Kovalev, 1990
- †Archaeoxylita zherikhini Nikitsky, 1977
- †Archaralites zherichini Legalov, 2010
- †Archelatona zherikhini Kotov & Korovchinsky, 2006
- †Arctopsychops zherikhini Makarkin, 1994
- †Arkagalarhinus zherikhini Legalov, 2021
- †Armanopimpla zherikhini Kopylov, 2010
- †Bacharia zherichini Gorochov, 1988
- †Baeomorpha zherikhini Gumovsky, Perkovsky, & Rasnitsyn, 2018
- †Baissaeshna zherikhini Bechly et al., 2001
- †Belonotaris zherichini (Legalov, 2010)
- †Brevista zherichini Alekseev, 1996
- †Burmantis zherikhini Delclos et al., 2015
- †Caulophilus zherikhini Nazarenko, Legalov, & Perkovsky, 2011
- †Codemus zherichini Dolin, 1980
- †Crepuraea zherichini Kirejtshuk & Ponomerenko, 1990
- †Cretamiris zherikhini Popov & Herczek, 1997
- †Cretodryinus zherichini Ponomarenko, 1975
- †Cretonanophyes zherikhini Liu & Ren, 2006
- †Cretoneta zherikhini Tshernova, 1971
- †Cretotortor zherikhini Ponomarenko, 1973
- †Ctenoplectrella zherikhini Engel & Perkovsky, 2006
- †Dolichoderus zherichini Dlusskiy & Perkovsky, 2002
- †Dysoneura zherikhini Sukacheva & Vassilemko, 2013
- †Electranthribus zherikhini Legalov, 2013
- †Eolepinotus zherikhini Hakim, Huang, & Azar, 2021
- †Eopericoma zherichini Kalugina & Kovalev, 1985
- †Folindusia zherichini Sukacheva, 1982
- †Formica zherikhini Dlussky, 2008
- †Gerocynips zherikhini Kovalev, 1994
- †Jantarimantis zherikhini Vrsansky, 2002
- †Juraconiopteryx zherichini Meinander, 1985
- †Katyacantharis zherikhini Kazantsev & Perkovski, 2019
- †Leptoconops zherikhini Szadziewski & Arillo, 2003
- †Leptosorus zherikhini Nikolajev, 2006
- †Magadanobracon zherikhini Belokobylskij, 2012
- †Microtitan zherichini Gorochov, 2003
- †Miostenolestes zherikhini Nel et al., 2003
- †Mongolrobeus zherikhini Nikolajev, 2004
- †Montsecanomalus zherikhini Soriano, Gratshev, & Delclos, 2006
- †Montsecephialtites zherikhini Rasnitsyn & Martinez-Delclos, 2000
- †Naibia zherichini Shcherbakov, 2007
- †Nyujwa zherichini Perkovsky, 1990
- †Oxycorynoides zherichini Arnoldi, 1977
- †Palaeoboreus zherikhini Sukacheva & Rasnitsyn, 1992
- †Palaeolibellula zherikhini Fleck, Nel, & Martinez-Delclos, 1999
- †Palaeometrioxena zherikhini Legalov, 2012
- †Palaeomyrmex zherikhini Dlusskiy, 1995
- †Palaeonanophytes zherikhini Legalov, 2013
- †Palaeosabatinca zherikhini Kozlov, 1988
- †Palaeostrobliella zherikhini Fedotova & Perkovsky, 2016
- †Paleopsychoda zherikhini Azar, Adaymeh, & Jreich, 2007
- †Passaloecus zherikhini Budrys, 1993
- †Peromyia zherikhini Perkovsky & Fedotova, 2004
- †Platycerus zherichini Nikolajev, 1990
- †Plesiognoriste zherikhini Blagoderov & Grimaldi, 2004
- †Prosystenus zherikhini Negrobov, 1976
- †Saldomortalia zherichini Popov, 1988
- †Schizoneurites zherichini Heie, 1989
- †Synapha zherikhini Blagoderov, 2007
- †Syntemna zherikhini Blagoderov, 2000
- †Tajmyraphis zherichini Kononova, 1975
- †Tuphephialtites zherikhini Zhang, Rasnitsyn, & Zhang, 2002
- †Zarzia zherichini Zaytsev, 1986
- †Zherichinius
- †Zherikhiniella
