= Antennardia =

Scientific classification
- Domain: Eukaryota
- Kingdom: Animalia
- Phylum: Arthropoda
- Class: Insecta
- Order: Diptera
- Family: Cecidomyiidae
- Subfamily: Micromyinae
- Tribe: Micromyini
- Genus: Antennardia; Mamaev, 1993

Type species
- Antennardia gallicola Mamaev, 1993

Genus of flies

Antennardia is a genus of midges in the family Cecidomyiidae. The four described species are found in the Holarctic realm. The genus was first described by Boris Mamaev in 1993, but was subsequently treated as a subgenus of Monardia until being reinstated at the genus level.

== Species ==
- Antennardia antennata (Winnertz, 1870)
- Antennardia gallicola Mamaev, 1993
- Antennardia saxonica (Jaschhof, 2003)
- Antennardia suorkensis Jaschhof & Jaschhof, 2020
