= Sagittaliseta =

Scientific classification
- Kingdom: Animalia
- Phylum: Arthropoda
- Class: Insecta
- Order: Diptera
- Family: Sphaeroceridae
- Genus: Minilimosina
- Subgenus: Sagittaliseta Papp, 2008

Type species
- Minilimosina siamensis Papp, 2008

Subgenus of flies

Sagittaliseta is a subgenus of flies belonging to the family Sphaeroceridae.

== Species ==
- M. siamensis Papp, 2008
