= Mycophila speyeri =

Scientific classification
- Domain: Eukaryota
- Kingdom: Animalia
- Phylum: Arthropoda
- Class: Insecta
- Order: Diptera
- Family: Cecidomyiidae
- Subfamily: Micromyinae
- Genus: Mycophila
- Species: M. speyeri

Binomial name
- Mycophila speyeri (Barnes, 1926)

Synonyms
- Pezomyia speyeri Barnes, 1926

Species of fly

Mycophila speyeri is a species of wood midge in the family Cecidomyiidae first described by Horace Francis Barnes in 1926.
