= Cretocordylomyia =

Scientific classification
- Kingdom: Animalia
- Phylum: Arthropoda
- Class: Insecta
- Order: Diptera
- Family: Cecidomyiidae
- Subfamily: Micromyinae
- Tribe: Campylomyzini
- Genus: †Cretocordylomyia; Gagne, 1977

Type species
- Cretocordylomyia quadriseries Gagne, 1977

Genus of flies

Cretocordylomyia is a genus of wood midges in the family Cecidomyiidae. The one described species - Cretocordylomyia quadriseries - is only known from Canadian amber from the Late Cretaceous collected in Canada near Cedar Lake. This genus was established by American entomologist Raymond J. Gagne in 1977.
