= Cretocatocha =

Scientific classification
- Kingdom: Animalia
- Phylum: Arthropoda
- Class: Insecta
- Order: Diptera
- Family: Cecidomyiidae
- Subfamily: Micromyinae
- Tribe: Catochini
- Genus: Cretocatocha; Gagne, 1977

Type species
- Cretocatocha mcalpinei Gagne, 1977

Genus of flies

Cretocatocha is a genus of wood midges in the family Cecidomyiidae. The one described species - Cretocatocha mcalpinei - is only known from Canadian amber from the Late Cretaceous collected in Canada near Medicine Hat. This genus was established by American entomologist Raymond J. Gagne in 1977.
