= Minilimosina (subgenus) =

Scientific classification
- Kingdom: Animalia
- Phylum: Arthropoda
- Clade: Pancrustacea
- Class: Insecta
- Order: Diptera
- Family: Sphaeroceridae
- Genus: Minilimosina
- Subgenus: Minilimosina; Roháček, 1983

Type species
- Limosina fungicola Haliday, 1836

Synonyms
- Minilimosina Roháček, 1982

Subgenus of flies

Minilimosina is a subgenus of flies belonging to the family Sphaeroceridae.

== Species ==
- M. accinta Marshall, 1985
- M. baculum Marshall, 1985
- M. bicuspis Roháček, 1993
- M. caelator Roháček, 1988
- M. curvispina Carles-Tolrá, 2001
- M. fungicola (Haliday, 1836)
- M. gemella Roháček, 1983
- M. hispidula Roháček, 1988
- M. intermedia Marshall, 1985
- M. knightae (Harrison, 1959)
- M. kozaneki (Kuznetzova, 1991)
- M. lepida Marshall, 1985
- M. longisternum Marshall, 1985
- M. meszarosi (Papp, 1974)
- M. microtophila (Papp, 1973)
- M. nasuta (Spuler, 1925)
- M. parafungicola (Papp, 1974)
- M. parva (Malloch, 1913)
- M. parvula (Stenhammar, 1855)
- M. pulpa Marshall, 1985
- M. rohaceki (Papp, 1978)
- M. sclerophallus Marshall, 1985
- M. similissima (Papp, 1974)
- M. sitka Marshall in Marshall & Winchester, 1999
- M. tenera Roháček, 1983
- M. trogeri Roháček, 1983
- M. tuberculum Marshall, 1985
- M. zeda Marshall, 1985
