= Menssana =

Scientific classification
- Kingdom: Animalia
- Phylum: Arthropoda
- Class: Insecta
- Order: Diptera
- Family: Cecidomyiidae
- Subfamily: Micromyinae
- Tribe: Micromyini
- Genus: †Menssana; Fedotova & Perkovsky, 2016

Type species
- Menssana norilsk Fedotova & Perkovsky, 2016

Genus of flies

Menssana is a genus of wood midges in the family Cecidomyiidae. The one described species - Menssana norilsk - is only known from Taymyr amber from the Late Cretaceous.
