= Ladopyris =

Scientific classification
- Kingdom: Animalia
- Phylum: Arthropoda
- Class: Insecta
- Order: Diptera
- Family: Cecidomyiidae
- Subfamily: Micromyinae
- Tribe: Micromyini
- Genus: Ladopyris; Jaschhof & Jaschhof, 2020

Type species
- Ladopyris baltica Jaschhof & Jaschhof, 2020

Genus of flies

Ladopyris is a genus of wood midges in the family Cecidomyiidae. The one described species - Ladopyris baltica - is known from Sweden and Estonia. The genus was established by Mathias Jaschhof and Catrin Jaschhof in 2020.
