= Pseudoperomyia =

Scientific classification
- Domain: Eukaryota
- Kingdom: Animalia
- Phylum: Arthropoda
- Class: Insecta
- Order: Diptera
- Family: Cecidomyiidae
- Subfamily: Micromyinae
- Tribe: Micromyini
- Genus: Pseudoperomyia; Jaschhof & Hippa, 1999

Type species
- Pseudoperomyia longicornis Jaschhof & Hippa, 1999

Genus of flies

Pseudoperomyia is a genus of midges in the family Cecidomyiidae. The 29 described species are found in the Palearctic and the Indomalayan regions. The genus was first described by Mathias Jaschhof and Heikki Hippa in 1999.

== Species ==
- Pseudoperomyia acutistyla Jaschhof & Hippa, 1999
- Pseudoperomyia bidentata Jaschhof & Hippa, 1999
- Pseudoperomyia bispinata Jaschhof & Hippa, 1999
- Pseudoperomyia bryomyoides Jaschhof & Hippa, 1999
- Pseudoperomyia composita Jaschhof, 2000
- Pseudoperomyia fagiphila Jaschhof, 2000
- Pseudoperomyia furcillata Jaschhof, 2000
- Pseudoperomyia gemina Jaschhof & Hippa, 1999
- Pseudoperomyia hondoensis Jaschhof, 2000
- Pseudoperomyia humilis Jaschhof & Hippa, 1999
- Pseudoperomyia intermedia Jaschhof & Hippa, 1999
- Pseudoperomyia japonica Jaschhof, 2000
- Pseudoperomyia labellata Jaschhof & Hippa, 1999
- Pseudoperomyia longicornis Jaschhof & Hippa, 1999
- Pseudoperomyia longidentata Jaschhof & Hippa, 1999
- Pseudoperomyia macrostyla Jaschhof & Hippa, 1999
- Pseudoperomyia obtecta Jaschhof & Hippa, 1999
- Pseudoperomyia obtusidentata Jaschhof & Hippa, 1999
- Pseudoperomyia oculibunda Jaschhof & Hippa, 1999
- Pseudoperomyia orophila Jaschhof & Hippa, 1999
- Pseudoperomyia parvolobata Jaschhof & Hippa, 1999
- Pseudoperomyia platystyla Jaschhof & Hippa, 1999
- Pseudoperomyia polyardioides Jaschhof & Hippa, 1999
- Pseudoperomyia psittacephala Li & Bu, 2001
- Pseudoperomyia pyramidata Jaschhof & Hippa, 1999
- Pseudoperomyia trispinata Jaschhof & Hippa, 1999
- Pseudoperomyia variabilis Jaschhof & Hippa, 1999
- Pseudoperomyia velata Jaschhof, 2000
- Pseudoperomyia ventricosa Jaschhof & Hippa, 1999
