= Atriculicoides incompletus =

Atriculicoides incompletus Temporal range: Upper Cretaceous

Scientific classification
- Kingdom: Animalia
- Phylum: Arthropoda
- Clade: Pancrustacea
- Class: Insecta
- Order: Diptera
- Family: Ceratopogonidae
- Genus: †Atriculicoides
- Species: †A. incompletus

Binomial name
- †Atriculicoides incompletus Szadziewski and Schlüter, 1992

Species of extinct midge

Atriculicoides incompletus is an extinct species of biting midge found in France.
