= Ansifera =

Scientific classification
- Domain: Eukaryota
- Kingdom: Animalia
- Phylum: Arthropoda
- Class: Insecta
- Order: Diptera
- Family: Cecidomyiidae
- Subfamily: Micromyinae
- Tribe: Campylomyzini
- Genus: Ansifera; Jaschhof, 2009

Type species
- Ansifera japonica Jaschhof, 2009

Genus of flies

Ansifera is a genus of midges in the family Cecidomyiidae. The five described species are found in the Palearctic and Oriental regions. The genus was first described by Mathias Jaschhof in 2009.

Species in this genus can be distinguished from others in the tribe Campylomyzini by characteristics of their antennal sensilla.

== Species ==
- Ansifera asetosa Jaschhof, 2009
- Ansifera gombakensis Jaschhof, 2009
- Ansifera japonica Jaschhof, 2009
- Ansifera longipalpus Jaschhof, 2009
- Ansifera malayensis Jaschhof, 2009
