= Micropteromyia =

Scientific classification
- Kingdom: Animalia
- Phylum: Arthropoda
- Class: Insecta
- Order: Diptera
- Family: Cecidomyiidae
- Subfamily: Micromyinae
- Tribe: Campylomyzini
- Genus: Micropteromyia; Mamaev, 1960

Type species
- Micropteromyia ghilarovi Mamaev, 1960

Genus of flies

Micropteromyia is a genus of wood midges in the family Cecidomyiidae. The one described species - Micropteromyia ghilarovi - is only known from Russia. The genus was established by Boris Mamaev in 1960.
