= Anodontoceras =

Scientific classification
- Domain: Eukaryota
- Kingdom: Animalia
- Phylum: Arthropoda
- Class: Insecta
- Order: Diptera
- Family: Cecidomyiidae
- Subfamily: Micromyinae
- Tribe: Micromyini
- Genus: Anodontoceras; Yukawa, 1967

Type species
- Anodontoceras saigusai Yukawa, 1967

Genus of flies

Anodontoceras is a genus of wood midges in the family Cecidomyiidae. There are three described species. The genus was established by Japanese entomologist Junichi Yukawa in 1967.

== Species ==
- Anodontoceras harrisi Jaschhof & Jaschhof, 2009
- Anodontoceras saigusai Yukawa, 1967
- Anodontoceras yukawai Jaschhof, 1998
