= Tekomyia =

Scientific classification
- Kingdom: Animalia
- Phylum: Arthropoda
- Class: Insecta
- Order: Diptera
- Family: Cecidomyiidae
- Subfamily: Micromyinae
- Tribe: Aprionini
- Genus: Tekomyia; Möhn, 1960

Type species
- Tekomyia populi Möhn, 1960

Genus of flies

Tekomyia is a genus of midges in the family Cecidomyiidae. The one described species - Tekomyia populi - is found in the Palearctic realm. The genus was established in 1960 by German entomologist Edwin Möhn.
