= Anocha =

Scientific classification
- Domain: Eukaryota
- Kingdom: Animalia
- Phylum: Arthropoda
- Class: Insecta
- Order: Diptera
- Family: Cecidomyiidae
- Subfamily: Micromyinae
- Tribe: Catochini
- Genus: Anocha; Pritchard, 1948

Type species
- Anocha spinosa (Felt, 1913)

Genus of flies

Anocha is a genus of midges in the family Cecidomyiidae. The eight described species are known from the holarctic region. The genus was first described by Arthur Earl Pritchard in 1948.

== Species ==
- Anocha celesteana Pritchard, 1960
- Anocha glabra Jaschhof, 2017
- Anocha grytsjoenensis Jaschhof, 2017
- Anocha japonica Jaschhof, 2017
- Anocha minuta (Jaschhof, 2009)
- Anocha moraviensis Jaschhof, 2017
- Anocha spinosa (Felt, 1913)
- Anocha vernalis Jaschhof, 2017
