= Amedia (fly) =

Scientific classification
- Kingdom: Animalia
- Phylum: Arthropoda
- Class: Insecta
- Order: Diptera
- Family: Cecidomyiidae
- Subfamily: Micromyinae
- Tribe: Strobliellini
- Genus: Amedia; Jaschhof, 1997

Type species
- Amedia floridana Jaschhof, 1997

Genus of flies

Amedia is a genus of wood midges in the family Cecidomyiidae. The only described species - Amedia floridana - is only known from Florida. The genus was established by Mathias Jaschhof in 1997.
