= Forbesomyia =

Scientific classification
- Kingdom: Animalia
- Phylum: Arthropoda
- Class: Insecta
- Order: Diptera
- Family: Cecidomyiidae
- Subfamily: Micromyinae
- Tribe: Catochini
- Genus: Forbesomyia; Malloch, 1914

Type species
- Forbesomyia atra Malloch, 1914

Genus of flies

Forbesomyia is a genus of wood midges, insects in the family Cecidomyiidae. The one described species - Forbesomyia atra - is known from North America. The genus was established by Scottish entomologist John Russell Malloch in 1914.
