= Atriculicoides hispanicus =

Atriculicoides hispanicus Temporal range: Lower Cretaceous

Scientific classification
- Kingdom: Animalia
- Phylum: Arthropoda
- Clade: Pancrustacea
- Class: Insecta
- Order: Diptera
- Family: Ceratopogonidae
- Genus: †Atriculicoides
- Species: †A. hispanicus

Binomial name
- †Atriculicoides hispanicus Szadziewski and Arillo, 2016

Species of extinct midge

Atriculicoides hispanicus is an extinct species of biting midge found in Spain.
