= Heterogenella =

Scientific classification
- Domain: Eukaryota
- Kingdom: Animalia
- Phylum: Arthropoda
- Class: Insecta
- Order: Diptera
- Family: Cecidomyiidae
- Subfamily: Micromyinae
- Tribe: Bryomyiini
- Genus: Heterogenella; Mamaev, 1963

Type species
- Heterogenella hybrida Mamaev, 1963

Synonyms
- Cervuatina Berest, 1993; Sidorenkomyia Fedotova, 2004

Genus of flies

Heterogenella is a genus of wood midges in the family Cecidomyiidae. The twelve described species are found in the Holarctic and Oriental realms. The genus was established by Boris Mamaev in 1963.

== Species ==
- Heterogenella aurita (Fedotova, 2004)
- Heterogenella bigibbata Mamaev & Berest, 1991
- Heterogenella californica Jaschhof, 1997
- Heterogenella cambrica (Edwards, 1938)
- Heterogenella finitima Mamaev, 1998
- Heterogenella hybrida Mamaev, 1963
- Heterogenella linearis Yukawa, 1971
- Heterogenella mamajevi Yukawa, 1967
- Heterogenella minuta Jaschhof, 2009
- Heterogenella puberula (Li & Bu, 2001)
- Heterogenella transgressoris Jaschhof, 1998
- Heterogenella transversa Li & Bu, 2002
