= Atriculicoides globosus =

Atriculicoides globosus Temporal range: Upper Cretaceous

Scientific classification
- Kingdom: Animalia
- Phylum: Arthropoda
- Clade: Pancrustacea
- Class: Insecta
- Order: Diptera
- Family: Ceratopogonidae
- Genus: †Atriculicoides
- Species: †A. globosus

Binomial name
- †Atriculicoides globosus (Boesel, 1937)

Synonyms
- Lasiohelea globosus Boesel, 1937 Lasiohelea creteus Boesel, 1937

Species of extinct biting midge

Atriculicoides globosus is an extinct species of biting midge found in Manitoba, Canada.
