= Atriculicoides szadziewskii =

Atriculicoides szadziewskii Temporal range: Lower Cretaceous

Scientific classification
- Kingdom: Animalia
- Phylum: Arthropoda
- Clade: Pancrustacea
- Class: Insecta
- Order: Diptera
- Family: Ceratopogonidae
- Genus: †Atriculicoides
- Species: †A. szadziewskii

Binomial name
- †Atriculicoides szadziewskii Pérez-de la Fuente et al., 2011

Species of biting midge

Atriculicoides szadziewskii is an extinct species of biting midge found in Spain.

== Etymology ==
The specific epithet "szadziewskii" is a genetive patronym and also a tribute to professor Ryszard Szadziewski for his contributions to the study of biting midges.
