= Polyardis =

Scientific classification
- Domain: Eukaryota
- Kingdom: Animalia
- Phylum: Arthropoda
- Class: Insecta
- Order: Diptera
- Family: Cecidomyiidae
- Subfamily: Micromyinae
- Tribe: Micromyini
- Genus: Polyardis; Pritchard, 1947

Type species
- Polyardis silvalis (Rondani, 1840)

Synonyms
- Campyloneura Lengersdorf, 1939

Genus of flies

Polyardis is a genus of midges in the family Cecidomyiidae. The ten described species are found in the Holarctic and Australasian realms. The genus was first described by entomologist Arthur Earl Pritchard in 1947.

== Species ==
- Polyardis adela Pritchard, 1947
- Polyardis bispinosa (Mamaev, 1963)
- Polyardis crebra (Pritchard, 1947)
- Polyardis illustris Jaschhof, 2004
- Polyardis micromyoides Jaschhhof, 1998
- Polyardis occulta Jaschhof, 1997
- Polyardis recondita (Lengersdorf, 1939)
- Polyardis silvalis (Rondani, 1840)
- Polyardis triangula Jaschhof, 2004
- Polyardis vitinea (Felt, 1907)
