= Svarciella =

Scientific classification
- Kingdom: Animalia
- Phylum: Arthropoda
- Clade: Pancrustacea
- Class: Insecta
- Order: Diptera
- Family: Sphaeroceridae
- Genus: Minilimosina
- Subgenus: Svarciella; Roháček, 1983

Type species
- Limosina (Scotophilella) splendens Duda, 1928

Synonyms
- Svarciella Roháček, 1982

Subgenus of flies

Svarciella is a subgenus of the genus Minilimosina, in the lesser dung fly family Sphaeroceridae.

== Species ==
These species belong to the subgenus Svarciella:

- Minilimosina amphicuspa Roháček & Marshall, 1988
- Minilimosina archboldi Marshall, 1985
- Minilimosina aterga Roháček & Marshall, 1988
- Minilimosina bipara Marshall, 1985
- Minilimosina brachyptera Roháček & Marshall, 1988
- Minilimosina concinna Roháček & Marshall, 1988
- Minilimosina contrasta Marshall, 1985
- Minilimosina cornigera Roháček & Marshall, 1988
- Minilimosina dissimilicosta (Spuler, 1925)
- Minilimosina egena Roháček, 1992
- Minilimosina fanta Roháček & Marshall, 1988
- Minilimosina flagrella Roháček & Marshall, 1989
- Minilimosina floreni Roháček & Marshall, 1988
- Minilimosina furculipexa Roháček & Marshall, 1988
- Minilimosina furculisterna (Deeming, 1969)
- Minilimosina gracilenta Su, 2015
- Minilimosina hastata Roháček & Marshall, 1988
- Minilimosina intercepta Marshall, 1985
- Minilimosina ismayi Roháček, 1983
- Minilimosina linzhi Dong & Yang, 2015
- Minilimosina masoni Marshall, 1985
- Minilimosina parafanta Su, 2015
- Minilimosina pujadei Carles-Tolrá, 2001
- Minilimosina spinifera Roháček & Marshall, 1989
- Minilimosina tapaeihella Su, 2015
- Minilimosina triplex Roháček & Marshall, 1988
- Minilimosina varicosta (Malloch, 1914)
- Minilimosina vitripennis (Zetterstedt, 1847)
- Minilimosina vixa Marshall, 1985
- Minilimosina xanthosceles Roháček & Marshall, 1988
- Minilimosina xestops Roháček & Marshall, 1988
