= Caputmunda =

Scientific classification
- Kingdom: Animalia
- Phylum: Arthropoda
- Class: Insecta
- Order: Diptera
- Family: Cecidomyiidae
- Subfamily: Micromyinae
- Tribe: Catochini
- Genus: Caputmunda; Fedotova & Perkovsky, 2016

Type species
- Caputmunda yantardakhica Fedotova & Perkovsky, 2016

Genus of flies

Caputmunda is a genus of wood midges in the family Cecidomyiidae. The one described species - Caputmunda yantardakhica - is only known from Taymyr amber from the Late Cretaceous. It differs from other genera in its tribe due to wing venation and a short first tarsomere.
