= Termitomastus =

Scientific classification
- Kingdom: Animalia
- Phylum: Arthropoda
- Class: Insecta
- Order: Diptera
- Family: Cecidomyiidae
- Subfamily: Micromyinae
- Genus: Termitomastus; Silvestri, 1901

Type species
- Termitomastus leptoproctus Silvestri, 1901

Genus of flies

Termitomastus is a genus of midges in the family Cecidomyiidae. The one described species - Termitomastus leptoproctus - is found in the South America. The genus was established in 1901 by Italian entomologist Filippo Silvestri.
