= Micromya =

Scientific classification
- Domain: Eukaryota
- Kingdom: Animalia
- Phylum: Arthropoda
- Class: Insecta
- Order: Diptera
- Family: Cecidomyiidae
- Subfamily: Micromyinae
- Tribe: Micromyini
- Genus: Micromya; Rondani, 1840

Type species
- Micromya lucorum Rondani, 1840

Synonyms
- Micromyia; Ceratomyia Felt, 1911; Crespiniella Kieffer, 1924

Genus of flies

Micromya is a genus of midges in the family Cecidomyiidae. The eleven described species are found in the holarctic, Neotropical, and Oriental realms. The genus was first described by Italian entomologist Camillo Rondani in 1840.

== Species ==
- Micromya brevisegmenta Mo, 1990
- Micromya championii Grover, 1962
- Micromya fusongensis Mo, 1990
- Micromya gurbaxii Grover, 1970
- Micromya indica Mani, 1937
- Micromya kyushuensis Yukawa, 1967
- Micromya longicauda Mo, 2000
- Micromya longispina Mo, 1990
- Micromya lucorum Rondani, 1840
- Micromya orientalis Grover, 1962
- Micromya transispina Mo, 1990
