= Corinthomyia =

Scientific classification
- Kingdom: Animalia
- Phylum: Arthropoda
- Class: Insecta
- Order: Diptera
- Family: Cecidomyiidae
- Subfamily: Micromyinae
- Tribe: Campylomyzini
- Genus: Corinthomyia; Felt, 1911

Type species
- Corinthomyia brevicornis (Felt, 1907)

Genus of flies

Corinthomyia is a genus of midges in the family Cecidomyiidae. The one described species - Corinthomyia brevicornis - is found in the Holarctic region. The genus was established in 1911 by American entomologist Ephraim Porter Felt.
