= Catocha =

Scientific classification
- Domain: Eukaryota
- Kingdom: Animalia
- Phylum: Arthropoda
- Class: Insecta
- Order: Diptera
- Family: Cecidomyiidae
- Subfamily: Micromyinae
- Tribe: Catochini
- Genus: Catocha; Haliday, 1833

Type species
- Catocha latipes Haliday, 1833

Genus of flies

Catocha is a genus of wood midges in the family Cecidomyiidae. There are eleven described species. The genus was established in 1833 by Irish entomologist Alexander Henry Haliday.

== Species ==
- Catocha angulata Jaschhof, 2009
- Catocha barberi Felt, 1913
- Catocha betsyae (Pritchard, 1960)
- Catocha brachycornis (Spungis & Jaschhof, 2000)
- Catocha incisa Jaschhof, 2009
- Catocha indica Mani, 1934
- Catocha jingfui Ševčík, Hippa & Burdiková, 2021
- Catocha latipes Haliday, 1833
- Catocha manmiaoae Ševčík, Hippa & Burdiková, 2021
- Catocha shengfengae Ševčík, Hippa & Burdiková, 2021
- Catocha subalpina Jaschhof, 2009
