= Atriculicoides swinhoei =

Atriculicoides swinhoei Temporal range: Lower Cretaceous

Scientific classification
- Kingdom: Animalia
- Phylum: Arthropoda
- Clade: Pancrustacea
- Class: Insecta
- Order: Diptera
- Family: Ceratopogonidae
- Genus: †Atriculicoides
- Species: †A. swinhoei

Binomial name
- †Atriculicoides swinhoei (Cockerell, 1919)

Synonyms
- Johannsenomyia swinhoei Cockerell, 1919

Species of extinct midge

Atriculicoides swinhoei is an extinct species of biting midge found in Burma.
