= Atriculicoides macrophthalmus =

Atriculicoides macrophthalmus Temporal range: Upper Cretaceous

Scientific classification
- Kingdom: Animalia
- Phylum: Arthropoda
- Clade: Pancrustacea
- Class: Insecta
- Order: Diptera
- Family: Ceratopogonidae
- Genus: †Atriculicoides
- Species: †A. macrophthalmus

Binomial name
- †Atriculicoides macrophthalmus Remm, 1976

Synonyms
- Atriculicoides squamiciliatus Remm, 1976

Species of extinct biting midge

Atriculicoides macrophthalmus is an extinct species of biting midge found in Krasnoyarsk Krai, Russia. It is the type species of its genus, Atriculicoides.
