= Excrescentia =

Scientific classification
- Domain: Eukaryota
- Kingdom: Animalia
- Phylum: Arthropoda
- Class: Insecta
- Order: Diptera
- Family: Cecidomyiidae
- Subfamily: Micromyinae
- Tribe: Campylomyzini
- Genus: Excrescentia; Mamaev & Berest, 1991

Type species
- Excrescentia mutuata Mamaev & Berest, 1991

Genus of flies

Excrescentia is a genus of midges in the family Cecidomyiidae. There are two described species that are found in the Holarctic region.

== Species ==
- Excrescentia alleghenyensis Plakidas, 2017
- Excrescentia mutuata Mamaev & Berest, 1991
