= List of Peromyia species =

This is a list of 203 species in Peromyia, a genus of wood midges in the family Cecidomyiidae.

== Peromyia species ==
- Peromyia abdita Jaschhof, 2009
- Peromyia aberrans Mamaev, 1963
- Peromyia abnormis Mamaev & Berest, 1990
- Peromyia acuminata Jaschhof, 2017
- Peromyia acutula Jaschhof, 2001
- Peromyia aeratipennis (Skuse, 1888)
- Peromyia albicornis (Meigen, 1830)
- Peromyia aleemkhani Jaschhof, 2001
- Peromyia ampla Jaschhof, 2001
- Peromyia anatina Mamaev & Berest, 1990
- Peromyia angellifera Jaschhof, 1997
- Peromyia angulata Jaschhof, 2001
- Peromyia angulosa Jaschhof, 2017
- Peromyia angustior Jaschhof, 2017
- Peromyia anisotoma Mamaev, 1994
- Peromyia anocellata Jaschhof, 2001
- Peromyia apposita Jaschhof, 1997
- Peromyia appositoides Jaschhof, 2017
- Peromyia assimilis Jaschhof, 2020
- Peromyia aurantiaca (Kieffer, 1894)
- Peromyia austrina Jaschhof, 2001
- Peromyia autumnalis Jaschhof, 2001
- Peromyia avia Jaschhof, 2001
- Peromyia ayaensis Jaschhof, 2001
- Peromyia bashfordi Jaschhof, 2010
- Peromyia bavarica Jaschhof, 2009
- Peromyia bengalensis Kieffer, 1905
- Peromyia bertviklundi Jaschhof, 2009
- Peromyia bicolor Edwards, 1938
- Peromyia bidentata Berest, 1988
- Peromyia bihamata Mamaev & Zaitzev, 1997
- Peromyia borealis (Felt, 1920)
- Peromyia boreojaponica Jaschhof, 2001
- Peromyia boreophila Jaschhof, 2001
- Peromyia brandenburgensis Jaschhof, 2017
- Peromyia brevispina Yukawa, 1967
- Peromyia brutostylata Jaschhof, 2017
- Peromyia capitata Jaschhof, 2001
- Peromyia caricis (Kieffer, 1901)
- Peromyia carinata Jaschhof, 2001
- Peromyia cassa Jaschhof, 2001
- Peromyia clandestina Jaschhof, 2004
- Peromyia centrosa Jaschhof, 2001
- Peromyia cinalata Jaschhof, 2010
- Peromyia clancula Jaschhof, 2009
- Peromyia clavata Jaschhof, 2017
- Peromyia cognata Jaschhof, 2017
- Peromyia composita Jaschhof, 1997
- Peromyia concitata Mamaev & Berest, 1994
- Peromyia consimilis Jaschhof, 2017
- Peromyia constricta Jaschhof, 2017
- Peromyia cornuta (Edwards, 1938)
- Peromyia culta Jaschhof, 2004
- Peromyia curta Jaschhof, 1997
- Peromyia curvostylata Jaschhof, 2017
- Peromyia debilis Jaschhof, 2010
- Peromyia denotata Jaschhof, 2009
- Peromyia derupta Jaschhof, 2004
- Peromyia despecta Jaschhof, 2010
- Peromyia devia Jaschhof, 2017
- Peromyia diadema Mamaev, 1963
- Peromyia didhami Jaschhof, 2004
- Peromyia directa Jaschhof, 1997
- Peromyia discreta Jaschhof, 1997
- Peromyia dissona Jaschhof, 2004
- Peromyia doci Jaschhof, 2004
- Peromyia dupla Jaschhof, 2017
- Peromyia edwardsi Berest, 1994
- Peromyia elongatula Jaschhof & Jaschhof, 2020
- Peromyia extensa Berest, 1991
- Peromyia fagiphila Jaschhof, 1997
- Peromyia fibyensis Jaschhof, 2009
- Peromyia fujiensis Jaschhof, 2001
- Peromyia fungicola (Kieffer, 1898)
- Peromyia galapagensis Jaschhof, 2004
- Peromyia gemella Jaschhof, 2001
- Peromyia gotohi Jaschhof, 2001
- Peromyia gracilostylata Jaschhof, 2017
- Peromyia grovei Jaschhof, 2010
- Peromyia gryphiswaldensis Jaschhof, 1997
- Peromyia horridula Jaschhof, 1997
- Peromyia hyalina Jaschhof, 2017
- Peromyia ibarakiensis Jaschhof, 2001
- Peromyia imperatoria Jaschhof, 2001
- Peromyia impexa (Skuse, 1888)
- Peromyia indecorata Jaschhof, 2010
- Peromyia indica Grover, 1970
- Peromyia inflata Jaschhof, 2017
- Peromyia insueta Jaschhof, 2004
- Peromyia intecta Jaschhof, 2004
- Peromyia intermedia (Kieffer, 1895)
- Peromyia intonsa Jaschhof, 2004
- Peromyia iuxtatruncata Jaschhof, 2017
- Peromyia karstroemi Jaschhof, 2017
- Peromyia katieae Jaschhof, 2004
- Peromyia lapponica Jaschhof, 2017
- Peromyia latebrosa Jaschhof, 2004
- Peromyia leveillei Kieffer, 1894
- Peromyia lindstroemi Jaschhof & Jaschhof, 2020
- Peromyia lippertae Jaschhof, 2017
- Peromyia lisatengoe Jaschhof, 2017
- Peromyia lobata Yukawa, 1971
- Peromyia lobuscorum Jaschhof, 2001
- Peromyia longistylata Jaschhof, 2017
- Peromyia maetoi Jaschhof, 2001
- Peromyia manca Jaschhof, 2017
- Peromyia mediterranea Mamaev, 1998
- Peromyia memoranda Jaschhof, 2004
- Peromyia menzeli Jaschhof, 2009
- Peromyia mica Mamaev & Zaitzev, 1998
- Peromyia minutissima Mamaev, 1963
- Peromyia mitrata Jaschhof, 1997
- Peromyia miyazakiensis Jaschhof, 2001
- Peromyia modesta (Felt, 1907)
- †Peromyia monilifera (Meunier, 1904)
- Peromyia monilis Mamaev, 1965
- Peromyia monticorvina Jaschhof, 2017
- Peromyia montivaga Jaschhof, 2001
- Peromyia mountalbertiensis Jaschhof, 2004
- Peromyia multifurcata Jaschhof, 2004
- Peromyia neglecta Jaschhof, 2017
- Peromyia nemorum (Edwards, 1938)
- Peromyia neomexicana (Felt, 1913)
- Peromyia niederhofensis Jaschhof, 2017
- Peromyia nitoda Jaschhof, 2010
- Peromyia novaezelandiae Jaschhof, 2004
- Peromyia obesa Jaschhof, 2001
- Peromyia obunca Jaschhof, 2004
- Peromyia oelandica Jaschhof, 2017
- Peromyia ogawaensis Jaschhof, 2001
- Peromyia okochii Jaschhof, 2001
- Peromyia ombergensis Jaschhof, 2017
- Peromyia orientalis Grover, 1964
- Peromyia ornata Jaschhof, 2001
- Peromyia ovalis (Edwards, 1938)
- Peromyia penicillata Jaschhof, 1997
- Peromyia perardua Jaschhof, 2004
- Peromyia perpusilla (Winnterz, 1870)
- Peromyia pertrita Jaschhof, 2004
- Peromyia photophila (Felt, 1907)
- Peromyia pilosa Jaschhof, 2001
- Peromyia plena Jaschhof, 2004
- Peromyia praeclara Jaschhof, 2004
- Peromyia prominens Yukawa, 1967
- Peromyia pseudoborealis Jaschhof, 2017
- Peromyia pumila Jaschhof, 2001
- Peromyia pumiloides Jaschhof, 2017
- Peromyia puncta Jaschhof, 2001
- Peromyia quercinophila Jaschhof, 2017
- Peromyia ramosa (Edwards, 1938)
- Peromyia ramosoides Jaschhof, 2009
- Peromyia rara Jaschhof, 2004
- Peromyia revelata Mamaev & Berest, 1990
- Peromyia rhombica Jaschhof, 2001
- Peromyia rotoitiensis Jaschhof, 2004
- Peromyia ryukyuensis Jaschhof, 2001
- Peromyia sacculiformia Mamaev & Berest, 1990
- Peromyia sanguinea (Kieffer, 1894)
- Peromyia scirrhosa Jaschhof, 2009
- Peromyia scutellata Mamaev, 1990
- Peromyia semota Jaschhof, 2001
- Peromyia semotoides Jaschhof, 2009
- Peromyia sera Jaschhof, 2004
- Peromyia serrata Jaschhof, 2004
- Peromyia setosa Jaschhof, 2004
- Peromyia seychellensis (Kieffer, 1911)
- Peromyia simpla Jaschhof, 2001
- Peromyia simulans Jaschhof, 2017
- Peromyia sinuosa Jaschhof, 2004
- Peromyia sofielundensis Jaschhof & Jaschhof, 2020
- Peromyia sororia Jaschhof & Jaschhof, 2017
- Peromyia sphenoides Jaschhof, 2001
- Peromyia spinigera Jaschhof, 2004
- Peromyia spinosa Jaschhof, 2001
- Peromyia squamigera Jaschhof, 2004
- Peromyia stenshuvudensis Jaschhof, 2017
- Peromyia subanatina Mamaev & Zaitzev, 1997
- Peromyia subbicolor Jaschhof, 2009
- Peromyia subborealis Jaschhof, 1997
- Peromyia subcurta Jaschhof, 2001
- Peromyia suberis Jaschhof, 1997
- Peromyia syltefjordensis Jaschhof, 1996
- Peromyia tasmanica Jaschhof, 2010
- Peromyia tecta Jaschhof, 2004
- Peromyia tenella Jaschhof, 2001
- Peromyia trifida Jaschhof, 2001
- Peromyia trifidoides Jaschhof, 2017
- Peromyia trimera (Edwards, 1938)
- Peromyia tripuncta Jaschhof, 2001
- Peromyia truncata Yukawa, 1967
- Peromyia tschirnhausi Jaschhof, 1996
- Peromyia tsukubasanensis Jaschhof, 2001
- Peromyia tumida Jaschhof, 2004
- Peromyia tundrae Jaschhof, 1996
- Peromyia uleforsi Jaschhof, 2017
- Peromyia uniseriata Jaschhof, 2017
- Peromyia upupoides Jaschhof, 1997
- Peromyia valens Jaschhof, 2001
- Peromyia vernalis Jaschhof, 2001
- Peromyia viklundi Jaschhof, 1997
- Peromyia warraensis Jaschhof, 2010
- Peromyia yezoensis Jaschhof, 2001
