= Amputella =

Scientific classification
- Kingdom: Animalia
- Phylum: Arthropoda
- Clade: Pancrustacea
- Class: Insecta
- Order: Diptera
- Family: Sphaeroceridae
- Genus: Minilimosina
- Subgenus: Amputella; Marshall, 1985

Type species
- Amputella ternaria Marshall, 1985

Subgenus of flies

Amputella is a subgenus of flies belonging to the family Sphaeroceridae.

== Species ==
- M. bistylus Marshall, 1985
- M. curvistylus Marshall, 1985
- M. digitata Marshall, 1985
- M. erecta Marshall, 1985
- M. priapismus Marshall, 1985
- M. ternaria Marshall, 1985
