= Pseudomonardia =

Scientific classification
- Domain: Eukaryota
- Kingdom: Animalia
- Phylum: Arthropoda
- Class: Insecta
- Order: Diptera
- Family: Cecidomyiidae
- Subfamily: Micromyinae
- Tribe: Pteridomyiini
- Genus: Pseudomonardia; Jaschhof, 2003

Type species
- Pseudomonardia hutchesoni Jaschhof, 2003

Genus of flies

Pseudomonardia is a genus of midges in the family Cecidomyiidae. The 15 described species are found in Australasia. The genus was first described by Mathias Jaschhof in 2003.

== Species ==
- Pseudomonardia australis Jaschhof, 2003
- Pseudomonardia communis Jaschhof, 2003
- Pseudomonardia dawnae Jaschhof, 2010
- Pseudomonardia dorani Jaschhof, 2010
- Pseudomonardia elongata Jaschhof, 2003
- Pseudomonardia glacialis Jaschhof, 2003
- Pseudomonardia hutchesoni Jaschhof, 2003
- Pseudomonardia invisitata Jaschhof, 2003
- Pseudomonardia neurolygoides Jaschhof, 2003
- Pseudomonardia niklasi Jaschhof, 2010
- Pseudomonardia pallida Jaschhof, 2003
- Pseudomonardia parva Jaschhof, 2003
- Pseudomonardia parvolobata Jaschhof, 2003
- Pseudomonardia tobiasi Jaschhof, 2010
- Pseudomonardia vicini Jaschhof, 2003
