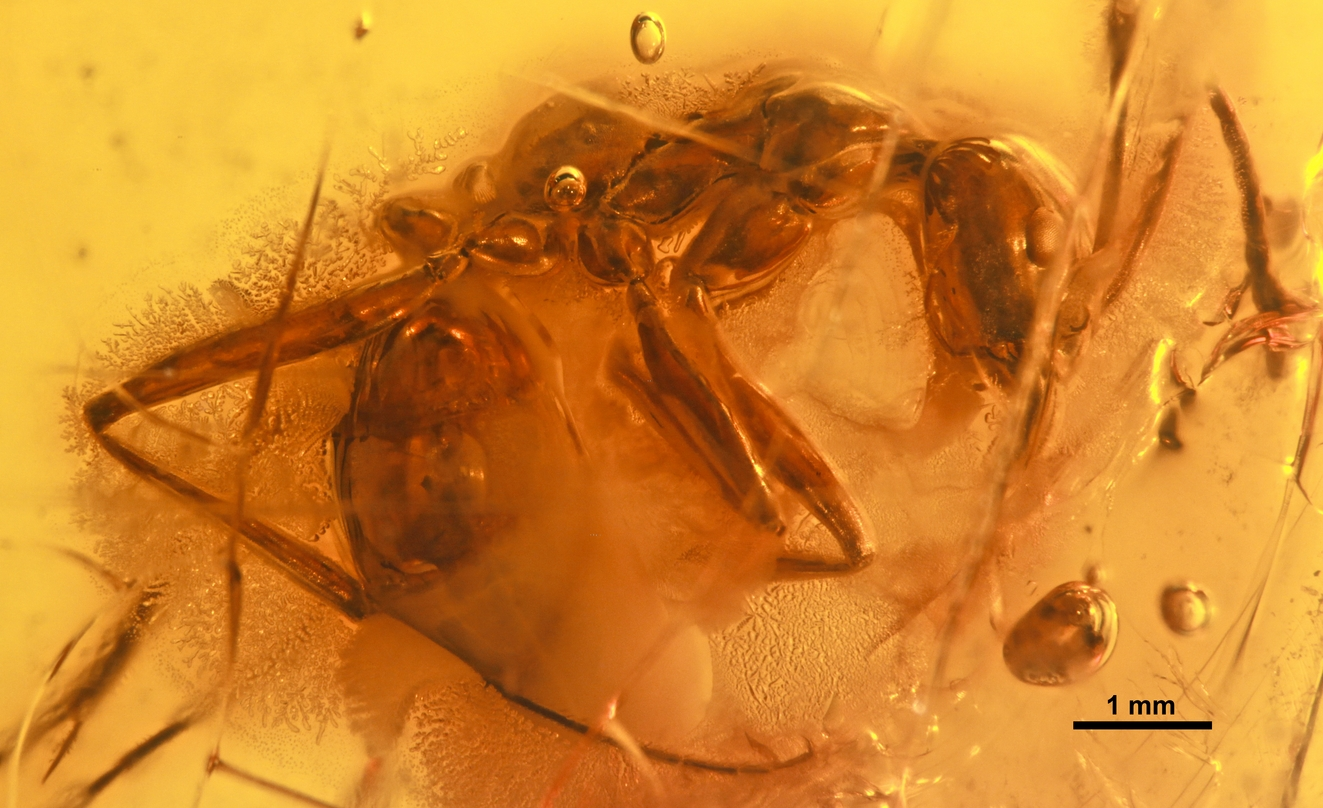
- P. tornquisti paratype

Scientific classification
- Domain: Eukaryota
- Kingdom: Animalia
- Phylum: Arthropoda
- Class: Insecta
- Order: Hymenoptera
- Family: Formicidae
- Subfamily: Aneuretinae
- Tribe: Aneuretini
- Genus: †Paraneuretus; Wheeler, 1915

Species
- P. dubovikoffi; P. longicornis; P. tornquisti

= Paraneuretus =

Paraneuretus Temporal range: Lutetian – Priabonian

Genus of ants

Paraneuretus is an extinct genus of formicid in the ant subfamily Aneuretinae known from fossils found in Asia and Europe. The genus contains three middle to late Eocene age species, Paraneuretus dubovikoffi, Paraneuretus longicornis, and Paraneuretus tornquisti.

== History and classification ==
Paraneuretus is known from over twenty five adult fossil specimens which are composed of complete adult males, female workers and queens. The first fossils were discovered preserved as inclusions in transparent chunks of Baltic amber. Baltic amber is approximately forty six million years old, having been deposited during Lutetian stage of the Middle Eocene. There is debate on what plant family the amber was produced by, with evidence supporting relatives of either Pinus, Agathis or Sciadopitys. The paleoenvironment of the Eocene Baltic forests were two Paraneuretus species lived was humid temperate to subtropical islands. The forests were composed of mostly Quercus and Pinus species, while the lower sections of the forests had paratropical plant elements, such as palms.

When first described the type specimens were included in several different collections including the University of Königsberg amber collection. The fossils were first studied by American entomologist William Morton Wheeler and described the genus plus two species in his 1915 paper The ants of the Baltic amber. Designated as the type species of the genus, P. tornquisti was described from a series of twenty two workers and two males placed into four different amber collections. In contrast, the species P. longicornis was described from a single male in the Klebs collection.

Since the genus and species descriptions by Wheeler, another species has been described from fossils found in Russia. The third species was described from compression fossils preserved in diatomite deposits of the Bol’shaya Svetlovodnaya site. Located in the Pozharsky District, on the Pacific Coast of Russia, the fossil bearing rocks preserve possibly Priabonian plants and animals which lived in a small lake near a volcano. The site has been attributed to either the Maksimovka or Salibez Formations and compared to the Bembridge Marls and Florissant Formation, both of which are Priabonian in age.

== Description ==
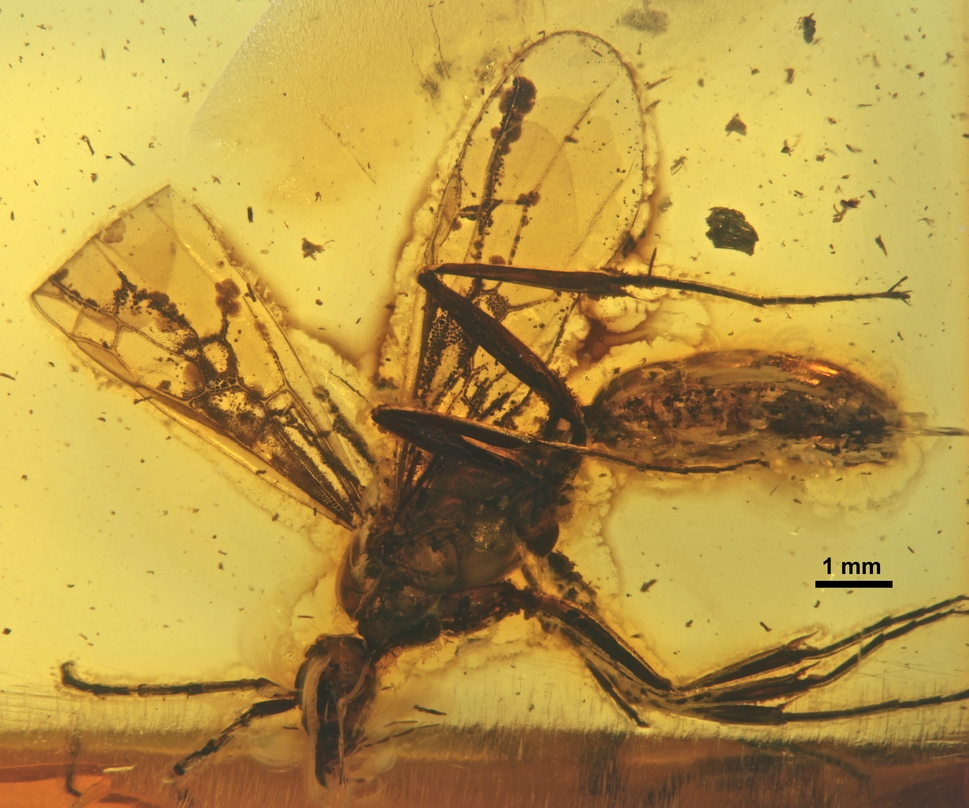
P. tornquisti androtype male

The genus is separated from other members of Aneuretinae, notably Aneuretus and Protaneuretus based on several characters. The workers are longer and more slender than those of the other genera, and they have an elongated, narrow head capsule. In all three species, the gaster is smooth, showing no contrition between the first and second segments, and the petioles are node shaped with a peduncle

=== P. dubovikoffi ===
P. dubovikoffi was described from a single worker and a single gyne, both deposited in the A. A. Borissiak Paleontological Institute collections, part of the Russian Academy of Sciences. The 6 mm (0.24 in) worker is preserved as a partial profile impression, missing portions of the legs and antennae. The eyes are placed a little past the midpoint of the head capsule towards back, and have an oval shape. The upper side of the pronotum has a rounded profile appearance, as does the pronotum, and a mesopropodial constriction is present. the petiole is a rounded node in shape and a short stalk attachment connects it to the propodium. The gyne is notably larger than the worker, at approximately 17–18 mm (0.67–0.71 in) long, and has a head that is wider than long when the mandibles are excluded. Also unlike the worker, the eyes are placed at the midpoint of the head, though they are small as the workers are. There are a number of denticles along the chewing margin on the large triangle shaped mandibles. While the scape extends beyond the back of the head, its total length is less than that of the head.

=== P. longicornis ===
Described from a single 7 mm (0.28 in) male in the private collection of Professor Richard Klebs of Königsberg University. It is smaller than the males of P. tornquisti but the antennae are longer, being nearly the same length as the body. The eyes P. longicornis are very convex and large with an almost totally circular outline. The petiole node has a longer base than in P. tornquisti while the gaster is shorter and the genitalia are not visible due to retraction into the gaster tip.

=== P. tornquisti ===
Workers of P. tornquisti range between 8–10 mm (0.31–0.39 in) long, with shiny black to red coloration and fine punctation on the whole exoskeleton. The heads have sparse hairs across the mandibles, clypeus and palpi, in addition to hairs sparsely scattered on the gaster. The antennae have scapes longer than the head capsule, with a third of the length past the rear edge of the head. All of the twelve antennae segments are elongate, each being at least twice as long as wide. The workers have a distinctly narrow thorax and bulging egg-shaped propodium. The node of the petiole is narrow and nearly double in length than it is wide, the node has a concave front edge and points rearward slowly. The males are similar in length to the larger workers, being about 10 mm (0.39 in) long. The thirteen segmented antennae are long, and reach to the second segment of the gaster. The petiole has the same proportions and profile shape as that of the workers. The gaster is narrow and long, with a slight widening from front to back and the genitalia have long and narrow stipites.
