= Atriculicoides taimyricus =

Atriculicoides taimyricus Temporal range: Upper Cretaceous

Scientific classification
- Kingdom: Animalia
- Phylum: Arthropoda
- Clade: Pancrustacea
- Class: Insecta
- Order: Diptera
- Family: Ceratopogonidae
- Genus: †Atriculicoides
- Species: †A. taimyricus

Binomial name
- †Atriculicoides taimyricus Szadziewski, 1996

Species of extinct midge

Atriculicoides taimyricus is an extinct species of biting midge found in Krasnoyarsk Krai, Russia.
