= Allolimosina =

Scientific classification
- Kingdom: Animalia
- Phylum: Arthropoda
- Clade: Pancrustacea
- Class: Insecta
- Order: Diptera
- Family: Sphaeroceridae
- Genus: Minilimosina
- Subgenus: Allolimosina; Roháček, 1983

Type species
- Limosina albinervis Duda, 1918

Synonyms
- Allolimosina Roháček, 1982

Subgenus of flies

Allolimosina is a subgenus of flies belonging to the family Sphaeroceridae.

== Species ==
- M. albinervis (Duda, 1918)
- M. alloneura (Richards, 1952)
- M. paralbinervis (Papp, 1973)
- M. pseudoalbinervis (Papp, 1973)
- M. rotundipennis (Malloch, 1913)
- M. secundaria (Duda, 1918)
