= Berestella =

Scientific classification
- Kingdom: Animalia
- Phylum: Arthropoda
- Clade: Pancrustacea
- Class: Insecta
- Order: Diptera
- Family: Cecidomyiidae
- Subfamily: Micromyinae
- Genus: †Berestella; Fedotova & Perkovsky, 2007

Type species
- Berestella insuperabilis Fedotova & Perkovsky, 2007

Genus of flies

Berestella is a genus of wood midges in the family Cecidomyiidae. The only described species, Berestella insuperabilis, is only known from Rovno amber from the Late Eocene. The genus was established in 2007 and named for Ukrainian entomologist Zoya L. Berest.
