= Vicemyia =

Scientific classification
- Kingdom: Animalia
- Phylum: Arthropoda
- Class: Insecta
- Order: Diptera
- Family: Cecidomyiidae
- Subfamily: Micromyinae
- Genus: †Vicemyia; Fedotova & Perkovsky, 2007

Type species
- Vicemyia immediata Fedotova & Perkovsky, 2007

Genus of flies

Vicemyia is a genus of wood midges in the family Cecidomyiidae. The one described species - Vicemyia immediata - is only known from Rovno amber from the Late Eocene.
