= Warramyia =

Scientific classification
- Kingdom: Animalia
- Phylum: Arthropoda
- Clade: Pancrustacea
- Class: Insecta
- Order: Diptera
- Family: Cecidomyiidae
- Subfamily: Micromyinae
- Tribe: Campylomyzini
- Genus: Warramyia; Jaschhof, 2010

Type species
- Warramyia weldensis Jaschhof, 2010

Genus of flies

Warramyia is a genus of wood midges in the family Cecidomyiidae. The one described species - Warramyia weldensis - is only known from Tasmania. The genus was established by Mathias Jaschhof in 2010.
