= Catarete =

Scientific classification
- Kingdom: Animalia
- Phylum: Arthropoda
- Class: Insecta
- Order: Diptera
- Family: Cecidomyiidae
- Subfamily: Micromyinae
- Tribe: Catochini
- Genus: Catarete; Edwards, 1929
- Species: C. brevinervis

Binomial name
- Catarete brevinervis (Zetterstedt, 1851)

Genus of flies

Catarete is a genus of wood midges in the family Cecidomyiidae. The one described species - Catarete brevinervis - is only known from Sweden. The genus was established in 1929 by British entomologist Frederick Wallace Edwards.
