= Tatiana Dobrolyubova =

- Born: 25 January 1891; Nizhegorod Province, Russian Empire
- Died: 24 July 1972 (aged 81); Moscow, Soviet Union
- Education: Moscow Higher Women's Courses
- Scientific career
- Fields: Geology and paleontology
- Workplaces: University of Moscow; Institute of Mineral Resources; Paleontological Institute

Tatiana Dobrolyubova (Russian: Татьяна Алексеевна Добролюбова; born 25 january 1891 – 24 july 1972) was a Russian geologist and paleontologist.

== Life and work ==
Tatiana Alekseevna Dobrolyubova was born in 1891 in Nizhegorod Province in the Russian Empire. She completed gymnasium in 1909 and was awarded a first-class diploma from the Moscow Higher Women's Courses in 1915. She trained as a teacher at the University of Moscow from 1920 and then became an assistant professor of geology there in January 1922. From 1921 to 1931 Dobrolyubova organized nine large geological survey expeditions to the northern Ural Mountains, but her interests gradually turned to paleontology rather than geology. In 1930 she was transferred the Institute of Chemical Technolog, teaching geology, and remained there until she moved to a paleontological group at the Institute of Mineral Resources in 1934. Two years later Dobrolyubova transferred to the Paleontological Institute and remained there until her death in 1972. During her career, she published 6 monographs and thirty publications. Although lacking in formal graduate-level education, she was awarded the Candidate of Sciences degree without a dissertation after the director of the Institute, Alexei Borisyak, called her "the best specialist on Carboniferous Rugosa in the Soviet Union."
