= Atriculicoides ciliatus =

Atriculicoides ciliatus Temporal range: Upper Cretaceous

Scientific classification
- Kingdom: Animalia
- Phylum: Arthropoda
- Clade: Pancrustacea
- Class: Insecta
- Order: Diptera
- Family: Ceratopogonidae
- Genus: †Atriculicoides
- Species: †A. ciliatus

Binomial name
- †Atriculicoides ciliatus (Borkent, 2012)

Synonyms
- Protoculicoides ciliatus Borkent, 2012

Species of extinct biting midge

Atriculicoides ciliatus is an extinct species of biting midge found in Alberta, Canada. It is only known from a male specimen.
