= Acoenonia =

Scientific classification
- Domain: Eukaryota
- Kingdom: Animalia
- Phylum: Arthropoda
- Class: Insecta
- Order: Diptera
- Family: Cecidomyiidae
- Subfamily: Micromyinae
- Tribe: Acoenoniini
- Genus: Acoenonia; Pritchard, 1947

Type species
- Acoenonia perissa Pritchard, 1947

Genus of flies

Acoenonia is a genus of midges in the family Cecidomyiidae. The six described species are found in the holarctic region. The genus was first described by Arthur Earl Pritchard in 1947.

== Species ==
- Acoenonia baltica Jaschhof, 2017
- Acoenonia europaea Mamaev, 1964
- Acoenonia nana Meyer & Spungis, 1994
- Acoenonia perissa Pritchard, 1947
- Acoenonia sidorenkoi Fedotova, 2004
- Acoenonia ulleviensis Jaschhof, 2017
