= Atriculicoides =

Atriculicoides Temporal range: Cretaceous

Scientific classification
- Kingdom: Animalia
- Phylum: Arthropoda
- Clade: Pancrustacea
- Class: Insecta
- Order: Diptera
- Family: Ceratopogonidae
- Subfamily: †Atriculicoidinae; Szadziewski, 1999
- Genus: †Atriculicoides; Remm, 1976

Type species
- †Atriculicoides macrophthalmus Remm, 1976

Genus of insects (fossil)

Atriculicoides is an extinct genus of biting midges. It is the sole member of the subfamily Atriculicoidinae.

== Species ==
The following list of species are included as of 2020:

- Atriculicoides cenomanensis Szadziewski and Schlüter, 1992
- Atriculicoides ciliatus (Borkent, 2012)
- Atriculicoides dasyheleis Szadziewski, 1996
- Atriculicoides globosus (Boesel, 1937)
- Atriculicoides hispanicus (Szadziewski and Arillo, 2016)
- Atriculicoides incompletus Szadziewski and Schlüter, 1992
- Atriculicoides macrophthalmus Remm, 1976
- Atriculicoides sanjusti (Szadziewski and Arillo, 2016)
- Atriculicoides sibiricus Szadziewski, 1996
- Atriculicoides swinhoei (Cockerell, 1919)
- Atriculicoides szadziewskii Pérez-de la Fuente et al., 2011
- Atriculicoides taimyricus Szadziewski, 1996
