= Neurolyga =

Scientific classification
- Domain: Eukaryota
- Kingdom: Animalia
- Phylum: Arthropoda
- Class: Insecta
- Order: Diptera
- Family: Cecidomyiidae
- Subfamily: Micromyinae
- Tribe: Campylomyzini
- Genus: Neurolyga; Rondani, 1840

Type species
- Neurolyga fenestralis Rondani, 1840

Synonyms
- Cordylomyia Felt, 1911; Microcordylomyia Mamaev & Mohrig, 1975

Genus of flies

Neurolyga is a genus of wood midges, insects in the family Cecidomyiidae. The 28 described species occur in the holarctic region. The genus was established by Italian entomologist Camillo Rondani in 1840.

== Species ==
- Neurolyga acuminata Jaschhof, 2009
- Neurolyga angulosa Jaschhof, 2009
- Neurolyga bifida (Edwards, 1938)
- Neurolyga bilobata (Mamaev & Rozhnova, 1982)
- Neurolyga collaris (Mamaev, 1963)
- Neurolyga constricta Jaschhof, 2009
- Neurolyga degenerans(Mamaev & Mohrig, 1975)
- Neurolyga denningi (Pritchard, 1947)
- Neurolyga excavata (Yukawa, 1967)
- Neurolyga fenestralis Rondani, 1840
- Neurolyga hastagera (Mamaev & Rozhnova, 1982)
- Neurolyga hyperborea (Mamaev, 1990)
- Neurolyga interrupta Jaschhof, 2009
- Neurolyga lonsdalensis Jaschhof, 2009
- Neurolyga longipes Jaschhof, 1997
- †Neurolyga magnifica Nel & Prokop, 2006
- Neurolyga ovata Jaschhof, 1996
- Neurolyga paludosa Jaschhof, 2009
- Neurolyga pritchardi Jaschhof, 1997
- Neurolyga semicircula (Bu, 1996)
- Neurolyga simillima Jaschhof & Jaschhof, 2020
- Neurolyga spinifera (Yukawa, 1971)
- Neurolyga subbifida (Mamaev, 1963)
- Neurolyga sylvestris (Felt, 1907)
- Neurolyga taigensis Jaschhof & Jaschhof, 2020
- Neurolyga truncata (Felt, 1912)
- Neurolyga venusta (Mamaev & Rozhnova, 1983)
- Neurolyga verna (Mamaev, 1963)
