= List of Aprionus species =

This is a list of 137 species in Aprionus, a genus of wood midges in the family Cecidomyiidae.

== Aprionus species ==
- Aprionus aberrantis Mamaev, 1998
- Aprionus abiskoensis Jaschhof, 1996
- Aprionus accipitris Jaschhof, 1997
- Aprionus acutus Edwards, 1938
- Aprionus adventitius Jaschhof, 2009
- Aprionus angeloides Jaschhof, 1997
- Aprionus angulatus Mamaev, 1963
- Aprionus aquilonius Jaschhof, 2009
- Aprionus arcticus Mamaev, 2001
- Aprionus asemus Pritchard, 1947
- Aprionus aviarius Mamaev & Berest, 1990
- Aprionus balduri Jaschhof & Jaschhof, 2017
- Aprionus barbatus Mamaev, 1963
- Aprionus berestae Fedotova, 2004
- Aprionus bestlae Jaschhof & Jaschhof, 2017
- Aprionus betulae Jaschhof, 1996
- Aprionus betuloides Jaschhof, 2015
- Aprionus bicorniger Mamaev, 1998
- Aprionus bidentatus (Kieffer, 1894)
- Aprionus bifidus Mamaev, 1963
- Aprionus bifurcatus Bu & Zheng, 1996
- Aprionus bispinosus Edwards, 1938
- Aprionus blanditus Mamaev, 1998
- Aprionus borri Jaschhof & Jaschhof, 2017
- Aprionus bostrichus Berest, 1997
- Aprionus brachypterus Edwards, 1938
- Aprionus brevitegminis Jaschhof, 2009
- Aprionus bullerensis Jaschhof, 2004
- Aprionus cardiophorus Mamaev, 1963
- Aprionus carinatus Jaschhof, 1996
- Aprionus carpathicus Mamaev, 1991
- Aprionus caucasicus Mamaev & Jaschhof, 1997
- Aprionus complicatus Mamaev, 1995
- Aprionus confusus Mamaev, 1988
- Aprionus corniculatus Mamaev, 1963
- Aprionus cornutus Berest, 1986
- Aprionus dalarnensis Mamaev, 1998
- Aprionus delectabilis Mamaev, 1998
- Aprionus demonstrativus Mamaev, 1998
- Aprionus denticulus Berest, 1986
- Aprionus dentifer Mamaev, 1965
- Aprionus dispar Mamaev, 1963
- Aprionus dissectus Mamaev & Berest, 1990
- Aprionus duplicatus Mamaev, 1998
- Aprionus ensiferus Jaschhof, 1996
- Aprionus fennicus Jaschhof, 2009
- Aprionus ferulae Mamaev, 1998
- Aprionus flavidus (Winnertz, 1870)
- Aprionus flavoscuta (Felt, 1907)
- Aprionus foliosus Jaschhof, 2009
- Aprionus fontanus Jaschhof & Jaschhof, 2017
- Aprionus forshagei Jaschhof & Jaschhof, 2015
- Aprionus friggae Jaschhof & Jaschhof, 2017
- Aprionus fujisanensis Jaschhof & Jaschhof, 2017
- Aprionus gladiator Jaschhof, 2009
- Aprionus gustavssoni Jaschhof & Jaschhof, 2015
- Aprionus halteratus (Zetterstedt, 1852)
- Aprionus hamulatus Bu & Zheng, 1996
- Aprionus heothinos Jaschhof, 2009
- Aprionus hintelmannorum Jaschhof, 2009
- Aprionus hugini Jaschhof & Jaschhof, 2017
- Aprionus hybridus Jaschhof, 2009
- Aprionus inaccessibilis Fedotova, 2004
- Aprionus indictus Mamaev & Jaschhof, 1997
- Aprionus inquisitor Mamaev, 1963
- Aprionus insignis Mamaev, 1963
- Aprionus internuntius Jaschhof, 2003
- Aprionus interruptus Yukawa, 1967
- Aprionus karlssonorum Jaschhof & Jaschhof, 2015
- Aprionus karsios Jaschhof, 2009
- Aprionus laevis Mohrig, 1967
- Aprionus lapponicus Jaschhof & Mamaev, 1997
- Aprionus laricis Mamaev & Jaschhof, 1997
- Aprionus latens Mamaev & Berest, 1990
- Aprionus latitegminis Jaschhof, 2009
- Aprionus lindgrenae Jaschhof & Jaschhof, 2015
- Aprionus longicollis Mamaev, 1963
- Aprionus longipennis (Felt, 1908)
- Aprionus longisetus Mohrig, 1967
- Aprionus longitegminis Yukawa, 1967
- Aprionus magnii Jaschhof & Jaschhof, 2017
- Aprionus magnussoni Jaschhof & Jaschhof, 2015
- Aprionus marginatus Mamaev, 1963
- Aprionus miki Kieffer, 1895
- Aprionus miniusculus Mamaev, 1998
- Aprionus miserandus Mamaev, 2001
- Aprionus monticola (Felt, 1920)
- Aprionus montivagus Jaschhof & Jaschhof, 2017
- Aprionus mossbergi Jaschhof & Jaschhof, 2020
- Aprionus multispinosus Yukawa, 1971
- Aprionus munini Jaschhof & Jaschhof, 2017
- Aprionus mycophiloides Jaschhof, 2004
- Aprionus odini Jaschhof & Jaschhof, 2017
- Aprionus ogawaensis Jaschhof & Jaschhof, 2017
- Aprionus oligodactylus Jaschhof, 2009
- Aprionus oljonsbyensis Jaschhof & Jaschhof, 2020
- Aprionus paludosus Jaschhof & Mamaev, 1997
- Aprionus piceae Jaschhof, 1997
- Aprionus pigmentalis Mamaev, 1998
- Aprionus pinicorticis (Felt, 1908)
- Aprionus pommeranicus Jaschhof & Mamaev, 1997
- Aprionus praecipuus Jaschhof, 2009
- Aprionus pratincolus Jaschhof & Meyer, 1995
- Aprionus pseudispar Jaschhof, 1997
- Aprionus pyxidiifer Mamaev, 1998
- Aprionus reduncus Jaschhof, 2009
- Aprionus remotus Jaschhof, 2004
- Aprionus rostratus Mamaev & Berest, 1990
- Aprionus rotundata (Plakidas, 2017)
- Aprionus separatus Mamaev & Jaschhof, 1997
- Aprionus sievertorum Jaschhof, 2009
- Aprionus sifae Jaschhof & Jaschhof, 2017
- Aprionus similis Mamaev, 1963
- Aprionus sleipniri Jaschhof & Jaschhof, 2017
- Aprionus smirnovi Mamaev, 1961
- Aprionus spiniferus Mamaev & Berest, 1990
- Aprionus spiniger (Kieffer, 1894)
- Aprionus stiktos Jaschhof, 2009
- Aprionus surcula (Plakidas, 2018)
- Aprionus stylatus Mamaev & Jaschhof, 1997
- Aprionus stylifer Mamaev, 1998
- Aprionus styloideus Mamaev & Berest, 1990
- Aprionus subacutus Jaschhof, 1997
- Aprionus subbetulae Jaschhof, 2015
- Aprionus surtri Jaschhof & Jaschhof, 2017
- Aprionus svecicus Jaschhof, 1996
- Aprionus taigaensis Jaschhof, 2009
- Aprionus terrestris Mamaev, 1963
- Aprionus thori Jaschhof & Jaschhof, 2017
- Aprionus tiliamcorticis Mamaev, 1963
- Aprionus transitivus Mamaev, 1998
- Aprionus transmutatus Mamaev, 1998
- Aprionus tyri Jaschhof & Jaschhof, 2017
- Aprionus umbrellus Mamaev & Berest, 1990
- Aprionus victoriae Jaschhof, 2009
- Aprionus wildeni Jaschhof, 1997
- Aprionus ymiri Jaschhof & Jaschhof, 2017
