= Atriculicoides dasyheleis =

Atriculicoides dasyheleis Temporal range: Upper Cretaceous

Scientific classification
- Kingdom: Animalia
- Phylum: Arthropoda
- Clade: Pancrustacea
- Class: Insecta
- Order: Diptera
- Family: Ceratopogonidae
- Genus: †Atriculicoides
- Species: †A. dasyheleis

Binomial name
- †Atriculicoides dasyheleis Szadziewski, 1996

Species of extinct biting midge

Atriculicoides dasyheleis is an extinct species of biting midge found in Krasnoyarsk Krai, Russia.
