= Tropaprionus =

Scientific classification
- Domain: Eukaryota
- Kingdom: Animalia
- Phylum: Arthropoda
- Class: Insecta
- Order: Diptera
- Family: Cecidomyiidae
- Subfamily: Micromyinae
- Tribe: Aprionini
- Genus: Tropaprionus; Jaschhof & Jaschhof, 2011

Type species
- Tropaprionus indicus (Jaiswal, 1988)

Genus of flies

Tropaprionus is a genus of wood midges, insects in the family Cecidomyiidae. There are seven described species in Tropaprionus.

== Species ==
- Tropaprionus aciculatus (Mamaev, 1997)
- Tropaprionus bifurcatus (Mamaev, 1997)
- Tropaprionus ellipticus (Mamaev, 1997)
- Tropaprionus indicus (Jaiswal, 1988)
- Tropaprionus kivachensis (Jaschhof, 2009)
- Tropaprionus lobatus (Mamaev, 1997)
- Tropaprionus plicatus (Fedotova, 2004)
