= Atriculicoides sibiricus =

Atriculicoides sibiricus Temporal range: Upper Cretaceous

Scientific classification
- Kingdom: Animalia
- Phylum: Arthropoda
- Clade: Pancrustacea
- Class: Insecta
- Order: Diptera
- Family: Ceratopogonidae
- Genus: †Atriculicoides
- Species: †A. sibiricus

Binomial name
- †Atriculicoides sibiricus Szadziewski, 1996

Species of extinct midge

Atriculicoides sibiricus is an extinct species of biting midge found in Krasnoyarsk Krai, Russia.
