= Peromyia =

Scientific classification
- Domain: Eukaryota
- Kingdom: Animalia
- Phylum: Arthropoda
- Class: Insecta
- Order: Diptera
- Family: Cecidomyiidae
- Subfamily: Micromyinae
- Tribe: Peromyiini
- Genus: Peromyia; Kieffer, 1894

Type species
- Peromyia leveillei Kieffer, 1894

Synonyms
- Joannisia Kieffer, 1894; Joanisia Enderlein, 1911; Joanissia Felt, 1911; Johannisia Enderlein, 1936; Camptoza Enderlein, 1936

Genus of flies

Peromyia is a genus of wood midges in the family Cecidomyiidae. There are 203 described species in Peromyia. The genus was established by Jean-Jacques Kieffer in 1894.

== See also ==
- List of Peromyia species
