= Pteridomyia =

Scientific classification
- Kingdom: Animalia
- Phylum: Arthropoda
- Class: Insecta
- Order: Diptera
- Family: Cecidomyiidae
- Subfamily: Micromyinae
- Tribe: Pteridomyiini
- Genus: Pteridomyia; Jaschhof, 2003

Type species
- Pteridomyia gressitti (Yukawa, 1964)

Genus of flies

Pteridomyia is a genus of midges in the family Cecidomyiidae. The four described species are all found in Australasia. The genus was first described by Mathias Jaschhof in 2003.

== Species ==
- Pteridomyia bilobata Jaschhof, 2003
- Pteridomyia grandiuscula (Skuse, 1890)
- Pteridomyia gressitti (Yukawa, 1964)
- Pteridomyia tasmanica Jaschhof, 2010
