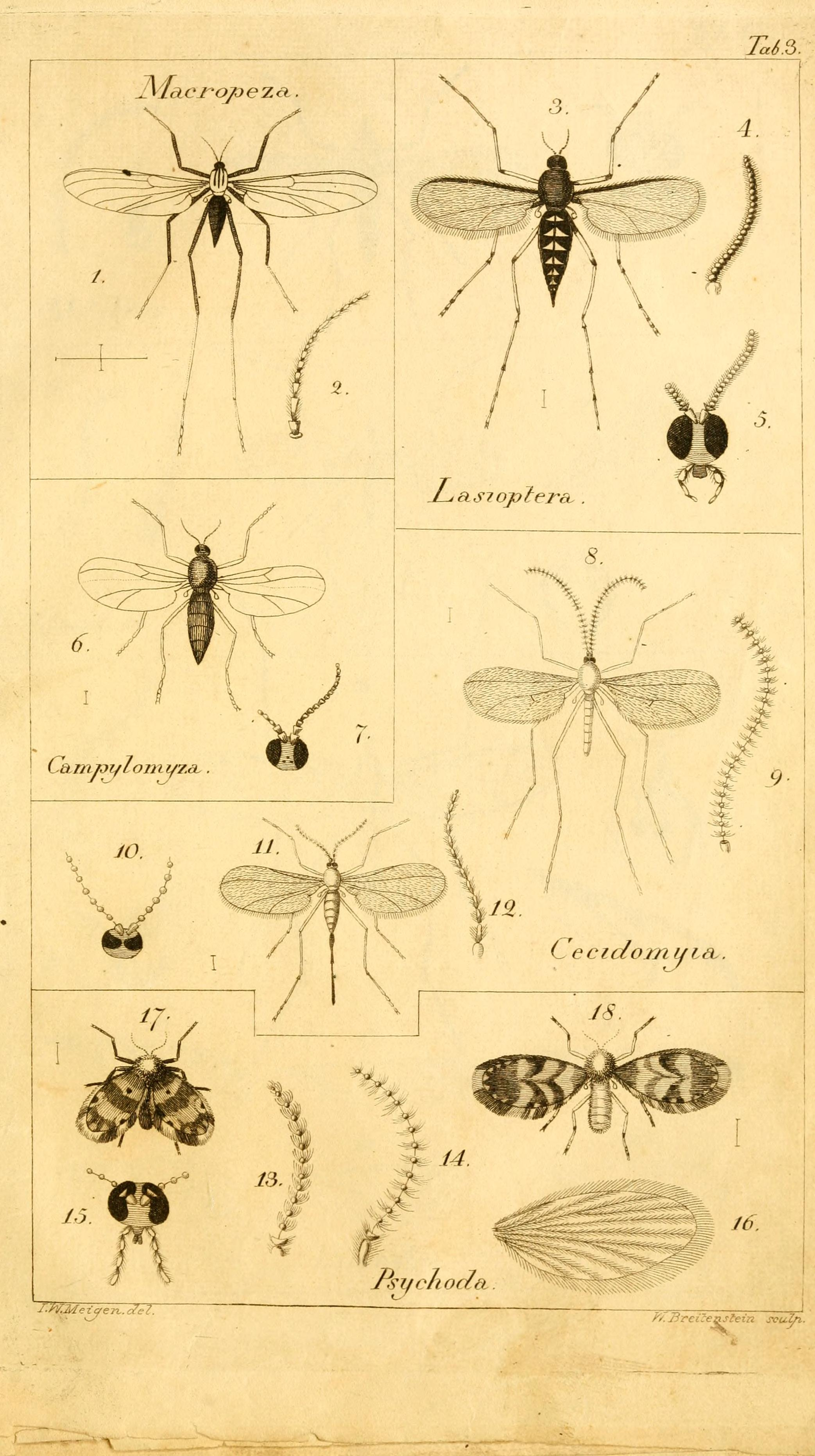
- Camplomyza in Meigen, Systematische Beschreibung der bekannten europäischen zweiflügeligen Insekten

Scientific classification
- Domain: Eukaryota
- Kingdom: Animalia
- Phylum: Arthropoda
- Class: Insecta
- Order: Diptera
- Family: Cecidomyiidae
- Subfamily: Micromyinae
- Tribe: Campylomyzini
- Genus: Campylomyza; Meigen, 1818

Type species
- Campylomyza flavipes Meigen, 1818

Synonyms
- Amblyspatha Kieffer, 1913; Campolomyia Siebke, 1877; Cyclophora Kieffer, 1913; Prionella Kieffer, 1894; Prionellus Kieffer, 1895; Prionota Kieffer, 1894; Urosema Kieffer, 1913

= Campylomyza =

Genus of flies

Campylomyza is a genus of midges in the family Cecidomyiidae. The 40 described species are found in the Holarctic, Oriental, Neotropical, and Australasian regions. The genus was first described by German entomologist Johann Wilhelm Meigen in 1818.

== Species ==
- Campylomyza abbreviata Jaschhof, 2009
- Campylomyza abjecta Mamaev, 1998
- Campylomyza aborigena Mamaev, 1998
- Campylomyza aemula Mamaev, 1998
- Campylomyza alnea Jaschhof, 2009
- Campylomyza alpina Siebke, 1863
- Campylomyza angulata Jaschhof, 2015
- Campylomyza appendiculata Jaschhof, 2015
- Campylomyza arcuata Jaschhof, 2009
- Campylomyza armata Mamaev, 1963
- Campylomyza bicolor Meigen, 1818
- Campylomyza borealis MJaschhof, 2009
- Campylomyza cavitata Mamaev, 1998
- Campylomyza cingulata Jaschhof, 2009
- Campylomyza cornuta Jaschhof, 1998
- Campylomyza cornoidea Jaschhof, 1998
- †Campylomyza crassitarsis Meunier, 1904
- Campylomyza cruciata Mamaev, 1998
- Campylomyza dilatata Felt, 1907
- Campylomyza falcifera Jaschhof, 2009
- Campylomyza flavipes Meigen, 1818
- Campylomyza furva Edwards, 1938
- Campylomyza fusca Winnertz, 1870
- Campylomyza hybrida Jaschhof, 2009
- Campylomyza inornata Jaschhof, 2009
- Campylomyza insolita Jaschhof, 2009
- Campylomyza lapponica Jaschhof, 2015
- Campylomyza mohrigi Jaschhof, 2009
- †Campylomyza monilifera Loew, 1850
- Campylomyza nigroliminata Mamaev, 1998
- Campylomyza ormerodi (Kieffer, 1913)
- Campylomyza paenebicolor Jaschhof, 2009
- Campylomyza pubescens Jaschhof, 2009
- Campylomyza serrata Jaschhof, 1998
- Campylomyza spatulata Mamaev, 1998
- Campylomyza spinata Jaschhof, 1998
- Campylomyza stegetfore Jaschhof, 2009
- Campylomyza tridentata Jaschhof, 1998
- Campylomyza zwii Jaschhof, 2015
