= Eltxo =

Scientific classification
- Kingdom: Animalia
- Phylum: Arthropoda
- Class: Insecta
- Order: Diptera
- Family: Cecidomyiidae
- Subfamily: Micromyinae
- Tribe: Strobliellini
- Genus: †Eltxo; Arillo & Nel, 2000

Type species
- Eltxo cretaceus Arillo & Nel, 2000

Genus of flies

Eltxo is a genus of wood midges in the family Cecidomyiidae. The single described species, Eltxo cretaceus, is only known from amber inclusions from the Lower Cretaceous of Spain.
