= Neocatocha =

Scientific classification
- Kingdom: Animalia
- Phylum: Arthropoda
- Class: Insecta
- Order: Diptera
- Family: Cecidomyiidae
- Subfamily: Micromyinae
- Tribe: Catochini
- Genus: Neocatocha; Felt, 1912

Type species
- Neocatocha marilandica Felt, 1912

Synonyms
- Konisomyia Felt, 1914

Genus of flies

Neocatocha is a genus of wood midges, insects in the family Cecidomyiidae. The one described species - Neocatocha marilandica - has a holarctic distribution. The genus was established by American entomologist Ephraim Porter Felt in 1912.
