= Minilimosina endrodyi =

Scientific classification
- Kingdom: Animalia
- Phylum: Arthropoda
- Class: Insecta
- Order: Diptera
- Family: Sphaeroceridae
- Genus: Minilimosina
- Subgenus: Amediella Papp, 2008
- Species: M. endrodyi

Binomial name
- Minilimosina endrodyi Papp, 2008

Species of fly

Minilimosina endrodyi is a species of lesser dung fly found in tropical Africa. It is the sole member of the subgenus Amediella.
