= Yukawamyia =

Scientific classification
- Kingdom: Animalia
- Phylum: Arthropoda
- Class: Insecta
- Order: Diptera
- Family: Cecidomyiidae
- Subfamily: Micromyinae
- Tribe: Aprionini
- Genus: Yukawamyia; Mamaev & Zaitzev, 1999

Type species
- Yukawamyia gratia Mamaev & Zaitzev, 1999

Genus of flies

Yukawamyia is a genus of midges in the family Cecidomyiidae. The one described species - Yukawamyia gratia - is found in the Palearctic realm.
