= Cretoperomyia =

Scientific classification
- Kingdom: Animalia
- Phylum: Arthropoda
- Class: Insecta
- Order: Diptera
- Family: Cecidomyiidae
- Subfamily: Micromyinae
- Tribe: Peromyiini
- Genus: †Cretoperomyia; Fedotova & Perkovsky, 2016

Type species
- Cretoperomyia dmitrii Fedotova & Perkovsky, 2016

Genus of flies

Cretoperomyia is a genus of wood midges in the family Cecidomyiidae. The one described species - Cretoperomyia dmitrii - is only known from Taymyr amber from the Late Cretaceous.
