= Psadaria =

Scientific classification
- Kingdom: Animalia
- Phylum: Arthropoda
- Clade: Pancrustacea
- Class: Insecta
- Order: Diptera
- Family: Cecidomyiidae
- Subfamily: Micromyinae
- Genus: Psadaria; Enderlein, 1940

Type species
- Psadaria pallida Enderlein, 1940

Genus of flies

Psadaria is a genus of wood midges in the family Cecidomyiidae. The one described species - Psadaria pallida - is only known from Alejandro Selkirk Island in Chile. The genus was established by Günther Enderlein in 1940.
