= Skuhraviana =

Scientific classification
- Kingdom: Animalia
- Phylum: Arthropoda
- Class: Insecta
- Order: Diptera
- Family: Cecidomyiidae
- Subfamily: Micromyinae
- Tribe: Bryomyiini
- Genus: Skuhraviana; Mamaev, 1963

Type species
- Skuhraviana triangulifera Mamaev, 1963

Genus of flies

Skuhraviana is a genus of midges in the family Cecidomyiidae. The one described species - Skuhraviana triangulifera - is found in the Holarctic region. The genus was established in 1963 by Soviet entomologist Boris Mamaev.
