= Groveriella =

Scientific classification
- Kingdom: Animalia
- Phylum: Arthropoda
- Class: Insecta
- Order: Diptera
- Family: Cecidomyiidae
- Subfamily: Micromyinae
- Tribe: Strobliellini
- Genus: Groveriella; Mamaev, 1978

Type species
- Groveriella carpathica Mamaev, 1978

Genus of flies

Groveriella is a genus of wood midges, insects in the family Cecidomyiidae. The two described species are known only from Europe. The genus was established by Boris Mamaev in 1978.

== Species ==
- Groveriella baltica Spungis & Jaschhof, 2000
- Groveriella carpathica Mamaev, 1978
