= Ipomyia =

Scientific classification
- Kingdom: Animalia
- Phylum: Arthropoda
- Clade: Pancrustacea
- Class: Insecta
- Order: Diptera
- Family: Cecidomyiidae
- Subfamily: Micromyinae
- Genus: Ipomyia; Colless, 1965

Type species
- Ipomyia bornemisszai Colless, 1965

Genus of flies

Ipomyia is a genus of wood midges in the family Cecidomyiidae. The one described species - Ipomyia bornemisszai - is only known from Australia. The genus was established by Australian entomologist Donald Henry Colless in 1965.
