= Proacoenonia =

Scientific classification
- Kingdom: Animalia
- Phylum: Arthropoda
- Class: Insecta
- Order: Diptera
- Family: Cecidomyiidae
- Subfamily: Micromyinae
- Tribe: Acoenoniini
- Genus: †Proacoenonia; Nel & Prokop, 2006

Type species
- Proacoenonia olgae Nel & Prokop, 2006

Genus of flies

Proacoenonia is a genus of wood midges in the family Cecidomyiidae. The single described species, Proacoenonia olgae, is only known from amber inclusions from the Lower Eocene of France.
