= Gagnea =

Scientific classification
- Kingdom: Animalia
- Phylum: Arthropoda
- Clade: Pancrustacea
- Class: Insecta
- Order: Diptera
- Family: Cecidomyiidae
- Subfamily: Micromyinae
- Tribe: Peromyiini
- Genus: Gagnea; Jaschhof, 2001

Type species
- Gagnea tsutaensis Jaschhof, 2001

Genus of flies

Gagnea is a genus of wood midges, insects in the family Cecidomyiidae. Its sole species, Gagnea tsutaensis, is known only from Japan. The genus was established by Mathias Jaschhof in 2001 and named after American entomologist Raymond Gagné.
