= Tritozyga =

Scientific classification
- Domain: Eukaryota
- Kingdom: Animalia
- Phylum: Arthropoda
- Class: Insecta
- Order: Diptera
- Family: Cecidomyiidae
- Subfamily: Micromyinae
- Tribe: Catochini
- Genus: Tritozyga; Loew, 1862

Type species
- Tritozyga sackeni Felt, 1911

Genus of flies

Tritozyga is a genus of midges in the family Cecidomyiidae. The two described species are found in the Holarctic region. The genus was established in 1862 by German entomologist Hermann Loew.

== Species ==
- Tritozyga sackeni Felt, 1911
- Tritozyga tyrestaensis Jaschhof, 2002
