= Zherikhiniella =

Scientific classification
- Kingdom: Animalia
- Phylum: Arthropoda
- Class: Insecta
- Order: Diptera
- Family: Cecidomyiidae
- Subfamily: Micromyinae
- Tribe: Strobliellini
- Genus: †Zherikhiniella; Fedotova & Perkovsky, 2016

Type species
- Zherikhiniella pedicellata Fedotova & Perkovsky, 2016

Genus of flies

Zherikhiniella is a genus of wood midges in the family Cecidomyiidae. The one described species - Zherikhiniella pedicellata - is only known from Taymyr amber from the Late Cretaceous.
