= Micromyini =

Scientific classification
- Domain: Eukaryota
- Kingdom: Animalia
- Phylum: Arthropoda
- Class: Insecta
- Order: Diptera
- Family: Cecidomyiidae
- Subfamily: Micromyinae
- Tribe: Micromyini

Tribe of flies

Micromyini is a tribe of wood midges, insects in the family Cecidomyiidae. There are about 9 genera and at least 30 described species in Micromyini.

== Genera ==
These nine genera belong to the tribe Micromyini:

- Anodontoceras
- Aprionus^{i c g}
- Bryomyia^{i c g}
- Micromya^{i c g}
- Monardia Kieffer, 1895^{i c g b}
- Mycophila^{i c g}
- Polyardis^{i c g}
- Strobliella Kieffer, 1898^{i c g}
- Trichopteromyia^{i c g}
- Xylopriona^{i c g}

Data sources: i = ITIS, c = Catalogue of Life, g = GBIF, b = Bugguide.net
