= Dolichoderus zherichini =

†Dolichoderus zherichini Temporal range: Late Eocene

Scientific classification
- Domain: Eukaryota
- Kingdom: Animalia
- Phylum: Arthropoda
- Class: Insecta
- Order: Hymenoptera
- Family: Formicidae
- Subfamily: Dolichoderinae
- Genus: Dolichoderus
- Species: D. zherichini

Binomial name
- Dolichoderus zherichini Dlussky in Dlussky & Perkovsky, 2002

Species of ant

Dolichoderus zherichini is an extinct species of ant in the genus Dolichoderus. Described by Dlussky and Perkovsky in 2002, the fossils were discovered in the Rovno amber, located in Ukraine.
