= Strobliella =

Scientific classification
- Kingdom: Animalia
- Phylum: Arthropoda
- Class: Insecta
- Order: Diptera
- Family: Cecidomyiidae
- Subfamily: Micromyinae
- Tribe: Strobliellini
- Genus: Strobliella; Kieffer, 1898

Type species
- Strobliella intermedia Kieffer, 1898

Genus of flies

Strobliella is a genus of midges in the family Cecidomyiidae. The one described species - Strobliella intermedia - is found in the Holarctic region. The genus was established in 1898 by Jean-Jacques Kieffer.
