= Monardia =

Scientific classification
- Domain: Eukaryota
- Kingdom: Animalia
- Phylum: Arthropoda
- Class: Insecta
- Order: Diptera
- Family: Cecidomyiidae
- Subfamily: Micromyinae
- Tribe: Micromyini
- Genus: Monardia; Kieffer, 1895

Type species
- Monardia stripium Kieffer, 1895

Synonyms
- Eleniella Berest, 2001; Furcapriona Mamaev & Zaitzev, 1996; Mycopriona Mamaev, 1965; Mycoporina Mamaev, 1999; Pezomyia Kieffer, 1913; Procnomyia Mamaev & Zaitzev, 1996; Vulcanardia Mamaev, 1993

Genus of flies

Monardia is a genus of wood midges, insects in the family Cecidomyiidae. The 53 described species in Monardia are grouped into three subgenera.

== Species ==
These 53 species belong to the genus Monardia:

- Subgenus Monardia
  - Monardia abnormis Mamaev, 1963
  - Monardia armata Jaschhof, 2003
  - Monardia canadensis Felt, 1926
  - Monardia carinata (Plakidas, 2017)
  - Monardia caucasica Mamaev, 1963
  - Monardia crassicornis Mamaev, 1963
  - Monardia dividua Jaschhof, 2004
  - Monardia kamtshatica (Mamaev, 1993)
  - Monardia kollari (Winnertz, 1870)
  - Monardia lapponica Jaschhof & Jaschhof, 2020
  - Monardia lignivora (Felt, 1907)
  - Monardia magna Edwards, 1938
  - Monardia malaisei Jaschhof, 2009
  - Monardia misella (Mamaev, 1993)
  - Monardia monilicornis (Zetterstedt, 1838)
  - Monardia multiarticulata Felt, 1914
  - Monardia nigrita (Mamaev, 1993)
  - Monardia obsoleta Edwards, 1938
  - Monardia pediculata (Mamaev, 1993)
  - Monardia recondita Hardy, 1960
  - Monardia recta (Mamaev, 1993)
  - Monardia separata (Mamaev, 1993)
  - Monardia stirpium Kieffer, 1895
  - †Monardia submonilifera Meunier, 1904
  - Monardia ulmaria Edwards, 1938
  - Monardia yasumatsui Yukawa, 1967
- Subgenus Trichopteromyia
  - Monardia absurda (Mamaev, 1993)
  - Monardia denticauda (Gagné, 1985)
  - Monardia dissecta (Fedotova, 2004)
  - Monardia gracilis (Mamaev, 1993)
  - Monardia magnifica (Mamaev, 1963)
  - Monardia manii (Nayar, 1945)
  - Monardia modesta (Williston, 1896)
  - Monardia relicta Jaschhof, 2009
- Subgenus Xylopriona
  - Monardia abbreviata Jaschhof & Jaschhof, 2020
  - Monardia adentis (Jaschhof, 1998)
  - Monardia articulosa (Felt, 1908)
  - Monardia atra (Meigen, 1804)
  - Monardia furcifera Mamaev, 1963
  - Monardia indica (Sharma & Rao, 1979)
  - Monardia monotheca Edwards, 1938
  - Monardia nilgiriensis (Sharma, 1993)
  - Monardia obscura Jaschhof & Jaschhof, 2020
  - Monardia ornata (Fedotova, 2004)
  - Monardia radiella (Mamaev, 1993)
  - Monardia sejuncta (Mamaev, 1993)
  - Monardia toxicodendri (Felt, 1907)
  - Monardia truncata Jaschhof, 2009
  - Monardia unguifera Berest & Mamaev, 1997
  - Monardia vividula (Mamaev, 1993)
- Incertae Sedis
  - Monardia fumea Jaschhof, 2004
  - Monardia furcillata Jaschhof, 2004
  - Monardia modica Jaschhof, 2004
