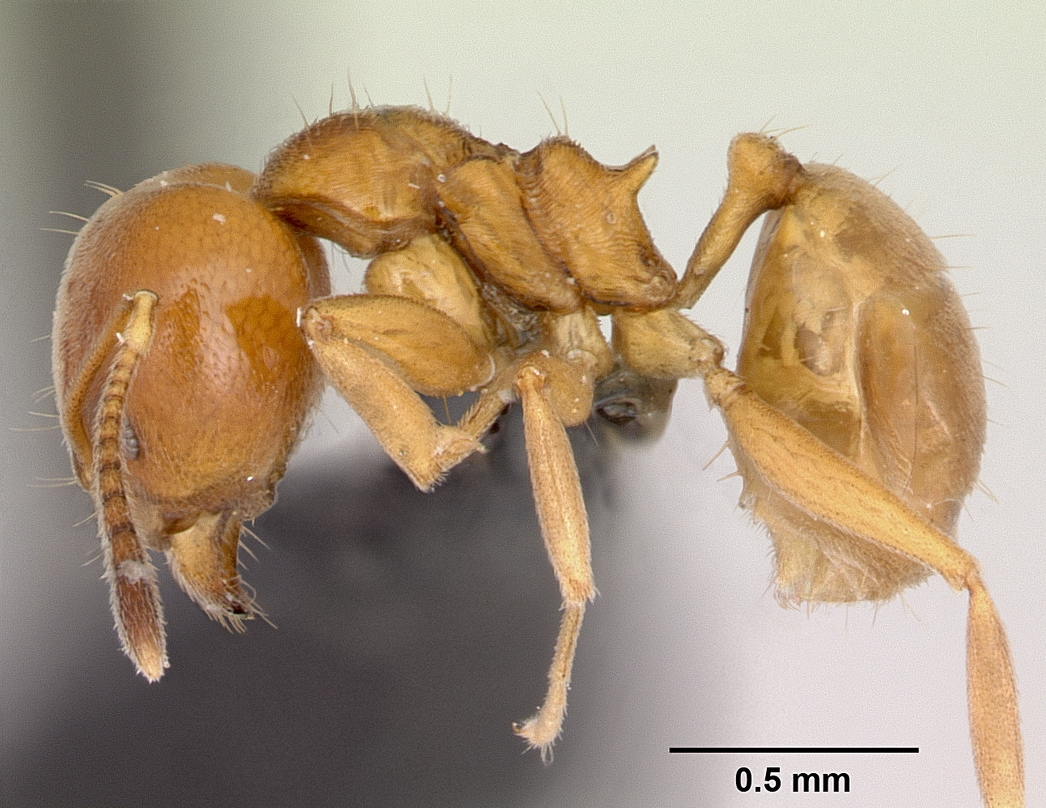
- Aneuretus simoni (Sri Lankan relict ant), the sole extant member of the subfamily

Scientific classification
- Domain: Eukaryota
- Kingdom: Animalia
- Phylum: Arthropoda
- Class: Insecta
- Order: Hymenoptera
- Family: Formicidae
- Subfamily: Aneuretinae; Emery, 1913

Type genus
- Aneuretus Emery, 1893

Diversity
- 9 genera

= Aneuretinae =

Subfamily of ants

Aneuretinae is a subfamily of ants consisting of a single extant species, Aneuretus simoni (Sri Lankan relict ant), and 9 fossil species. Earlier, the phylogenetic position of A. simoni was thought to be intermediate between primitive and advanced subfamilies of ants, but recent studies have shown it is the nearest living relative of subfamily Dolichoderinae.

== Genera ==
- Aneuretini Emery, 1913
  - †Aneuretellus Dlussky, 1988
  - Aneuretus Emery, 1893
  - †Mianeuretus Carpenter, 1930
  - †Paraneuretus Wheeler, 1915
  - †Protaneuretus Wheeler, 1915
- †Pityomyrmecini Wheeler, 1915
  - †Pityomyrmex Wheeler, 1915
- incertae sedis
  - †Britaneuretus Dlussky & Perfilieva, 2014
  - †Cananeuretus Engel & Grimaldi, 2005

Burmomyrma was formerly placed here, but is actually an ant-mimic wasp.
