= Bryomyia =

Scientific classification
- Domain: Eukaryota
- Kingdom: Animalia
- Phylum: Arthropoda
- Class: Insecta
- Order: Diptera
- Family: Cecidomyiidae
- Subfamily: Micromyinae
- Tribe: Bryomyiini
- Genus: Bryomyia; Kieffer, 1895

Type species
- Bryomyia bergrothi Kieffer, 1895

Genus of flies

Bryomyia is a genus of midges in the family Cecidomyiidae. The six described species are found in the Holarctic and Oriental regions. The genus was first described by Jean-Jacques Kieffer in 1895.

== Species ==
- Bryomyia amurensis Mamaev & Økland, 1998
- Bryomyia apsectra Edwards, 1938
- Bryomyia bergrothi Kieffer, 1895
- Bryomyia gibbosa (Felt, 1907)
- Bryomyia helmuti Jaschhof, 2008
- Bryomyia producta (Felt, 1908)
