= Mycophila =

Scientific classification
- Domain: Eukaryota
- Kingdom: Animalia
- Phylum: Arthropoda
- Class: Insecta
- Order: Diptera
- Family: Cecidomyiidae
- Subfamily: Micromyinae
- Tribe: Aprionini
- Genus: Mycophila; Felt, 1911

Type species
- Mycophila fungicola Felt, 1911

Genus of flies

Mycophila is a genus of wood midges, insects in the family Cecidomyiidae. There are seven described species in Mycophila. The genus was established by Ephraim Porter Felt in 1911.

== Species ==
- Mycophila echinoidea Bu & Mo, 1996
- Mycophila fungicola Felt, 1911
- Mycophila indica Nayar, 1949
- Mycophila lampra Pritchard, 1947
- Mycophila longispina Bu & Mo, 1996
- Mycophila nikoleii Möhn, 1960
- Mycophila speyeri (Barnes, 1926)
