= Aprionus =

Scientific classification
- Domain: Eukaryota
- Kingdom: Animalia
- Phylum: Arthropoda
- Class: Insecta
- Order: Diptera
- Family: Cecidomyiidae
- Subfamily: Micromyinae
- Tribe: Aprionini
- Genus: Aprionus; Kieffer, 1894

Type species
- Aprionus spiniger Kieffer, 1894

Synonyms
- Apriona Kieffer, 1894; Apriocryptus Mamaev & Berest, 1992; Apionus Berest, 1992; Crenuatus Berest, 1992; Operirus Berest, 1992; Subapionus Mamaev, 1998; Porianus Mamaev, 1998; Azygotricha Plakidas, 2017; Ampullomyia Plakidas, 2018

Genus of flies

Aprionus is a genus of wood midges in the family Cecidomyiidae. There are at least 137 described species in Aprionus. The genus was established by Jean-Jacques Kieffer in 1894.

== See also ==
- List of Aprionus species
