= Minilimosina kozaneki =

Scientific classification
- Kingdom: Animalia
- Phylum: Arthropoda
- Class: Insecta
- Order: Diptera
- Family: Sphaeroceridae
- Genus: Minilimosina
- Species: M. kozaneki

Binomial name
- Minilimosina kozaneki (Kuznetzova, 1991)

Synonyms
- Trachyopella kozaneki Kuznetzova, 1991

Species of flies

Minilimosina is a species of lesser dung fly in the family Sphaeroceridae. The species was first described in 1991 by Kuznetzova as Trachyopella kozaneki.

It is found on the Korean Peninsula.
