= Amediella (fly) =

Scientific classification
- Kingdom: Animalia
- Phylum: Arthropoda
- Class: Insecta
- Order: Diptera
- Family: Cecidomyiidae
- Subfamily: Micromyinae
- Tribe: Strobliellini
- Genus: Amediella; Jaschhof,

Type species
- Amediella involuta Jaschhof, 2003

Genus of flies

Amediella is a genus of midges in the family Cecidomyiidae. The one described species - Amediella involuta - is known only from New Zealand.
