= Minilimosina =

Scientific classification
- Kingdom: Animalia
- Phylum: Arthropoda
- Clade: Pancrustacea
- Class: Insecta
- Order: Diptera
- Family: Sphaeroceridae
- Subfamily: Limosininae
- Genus: Minilimosina; Roháček, 1983

Type species
- Limosina fungicola Haliday, 1836

Synonyms
- Minilimosina Roháček, 1982

Genus of flies

Minilimosina is a genus of lesser dung flies in the family Sphaeroceridae. There are more than 70 described species in Minilimosina, found on every continent except Antarctica.

== Species ==
These 72 species belong to the genus Minilimosina:

Subgenus Allolimosina Roháček, 1983

- Minilimosina albinervis (Duda, 1918)
- Minilimosina cerciseta Su, 2011
- Minilimosina luteola Su, 2011
- Minilimosina quadrispinosa Su, 2011
- Minilimosina rotundipennis (Malloch, 1913)

Subgenus Amputella Marshall, 1985

- Minilimosina bistylus Marshall, 1985
- Minilimosina curvistylus Marshall, 1985
- Minilimosina digitata Marshall, 1985
- Minilimosina erecta Marshall, 1985
- Minilimosina priapismus Marshall, 1985
- Minilimosina ternaria Marshall, 1985

Subgenus Minilimosina Roháček, 1983

- Minilimosina accinta Marshall, 1985
- Minilimosina baculum Marshall, 1985
- Minilimosina bicuspis Roháček, 1993
- Minilimosina caelator Roháček, 1988
- Minilimosina curvispina Carles-Tolrá, 2001
- Minilimosina fungicola (Haliday, 1836)
- Minilimosina gemella Roháček, 1983
- Minilimosina hispidula Roháček, 1988
- Minilimosina intermedia Marshall, 1985
- Minilimosina knightae (Harrison, 1959)
- Minilimosina lepida Marshall, 1985
- Minilimosina longisternum Marshall, 1985
- Minilimosina nasuta (Spuler, 1925)
- Minilimosina parva (Malloch, 1913)
- Minilimosina parvula (Stenhammar, 1855)
- Minilimosina prominulata (Su, 2013)
- Minilimosina pulpa Marshall, 1985
- Minilimosina sclerophallus Marshall, 1985
- Minilimosina selecta Papp, 2017
- Minilimosina speluncana Roháček, 2019
- Minilimosina tenera Roháček, 1983
- Minilimosina trogeri Roháček, 1983
- Minilimosina tuberculum Marshall, 1985
- Minilimosina zeda Marshall, 1985

Subgenus Svarciella Roháček, 1983

- Minilimosina amphicuspa Roháček & Marshall, 1988
- Minilimosina archboldi Marshall, 1985
- Minilimosina aterga Roháček & Marshall, 1988
- Minilimosina bipara Marshall, 1985
- Minilimosina brachyptera Roháček & Marshall, 1988
- Minilimosina concinna Roháček & Marshall, 1988
- Minilimosina contrasta Marshall, 1985
- Minilimosina cornigera Roháček & Marshall, 1988
- Minilimosina dissimilicosta (Spuler, 1925)
- Minilimosina egena Roháček, 1992
- Minilimosina fanta Roháček & Marshall, 1988
- Minilimosina flagrella Roháček & Marshall, 1989
- Minilimosina floreni Roháček & Marshall, 1988
- Minilimosina furculipexa Roháček & Marshall, 1988
- Minilimosina furculisterna (Deeming, 1969)
- Minilimosina gracilenta Su, 2015
- Minilimosina hastata Roháček & Marshall, 1988
- Minilimosina intercepta Marshall, 1985
- Minilimosina ismayi Roháček, 1983
- Minilimosina linzhi Dong & Yang, 2015
- Minilimosina masoni Marshall, 1985
- Minilimosina parafanta Su, 2015
- Minilimosina pujadei Carles-Tolrá, 2001
- Minilimosina spinifera Roháček & Marshall, 1989
- Minilimosina tapaeihella Su, 2015
- Minilimosina triplex Roháček & Marshall, 1988
- Minilimosina varicosta (Malloch, 1914)
- Minilimosina vitripennis (Zetterstedt, 1847)
- Minilimosina vixa Marshall, 1985
- Minilimosina xanthosceles Roháček & Marshall, 1988
- Minilimosina xestops Roháček & Marshall, 1988

Subgenus Svaricella

- Minilimosina luteola Su, 2011
- Minilimosina rohaceki Papp, 2017

Subgenus not assigned

- Minilimosina kozaneki (Kuznetzova, 1991)
- Minilimosina obtusispina Su, Liu & Wang, 2013
- Minilimosina puncticorpoides (Papp, 1973)
- Minilimosina sitka Marshall & Winchester, 1999
