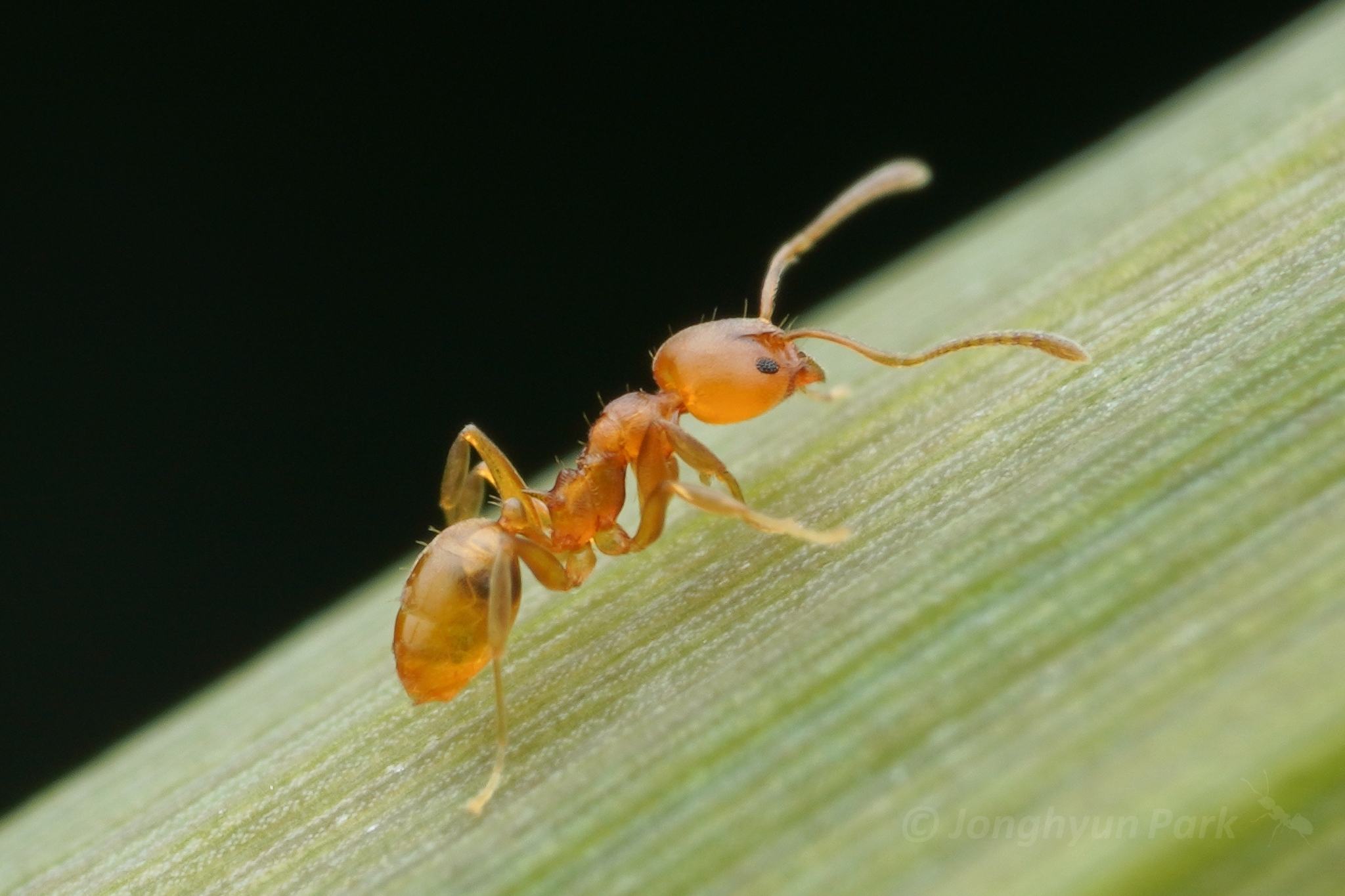
- Aneuretus simoni worker

Conservation status
- Critically Endangered (IUCN 2.3)

Scientific classification
- Kingdom: Animalia
- Phylum: Arthropoda
- Class: Insecta
- Order: Hymenoptera
- Family: Formicidae
- Subfamily: Aneuretinae
- Tribe: Aneuretini
- Genus: Aneuretus; Emery, 1893
- Species: A. simoni

Binomial name
- Aneuretus simoni Emery, 1893

= Sri Lankan relict ant =

Species of ant

The Sri Lankan relict ant (Aneuretus simoni) is a species of ant placed in a tribe of its own within the family Formicidae. The genus is monotypic, with the only species endemic to Sri Lanka, where it is known from just a few locations. It is one of the few ant species considered endangered.

== Description ==
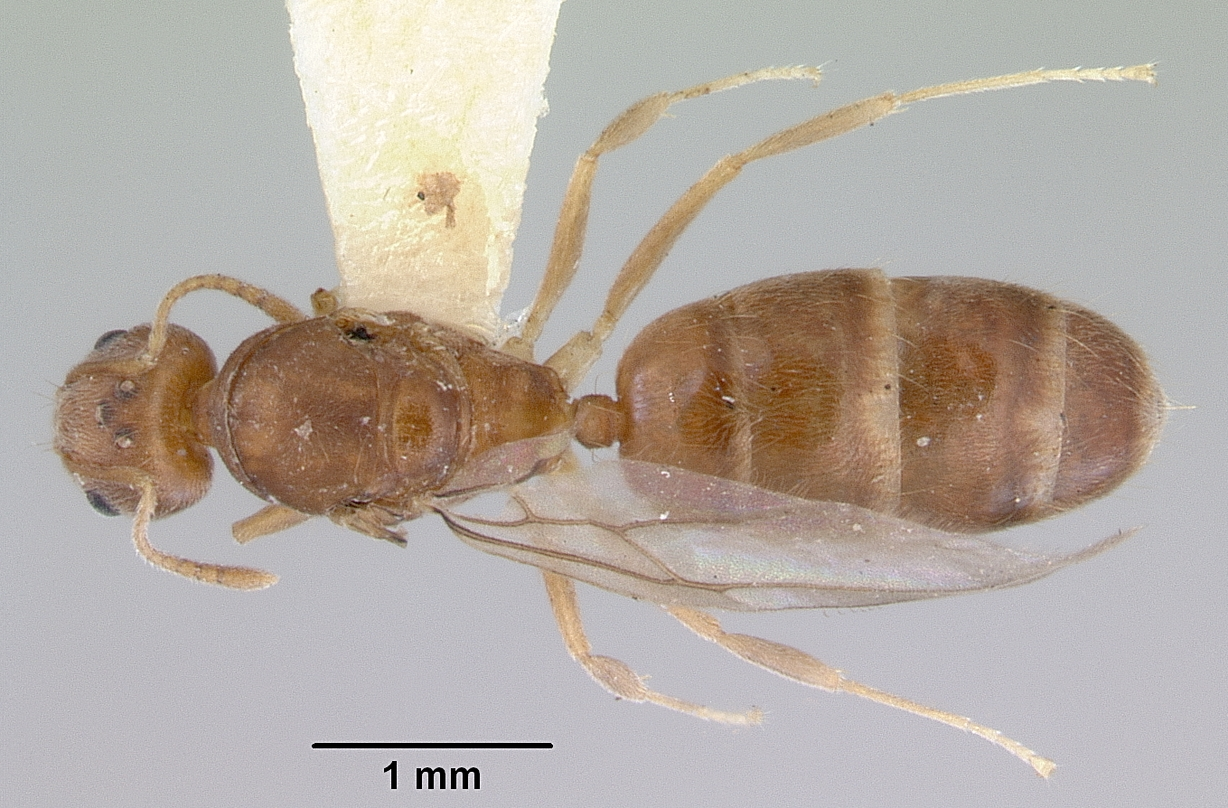
A winged queen

The species is the only extant genus in the tribe Aneuretini (other members include the extinct Protaneuretus, Paraneretus, and Mianeuretus). They are believed to be intermediate in their phylogenetic position between the Myrmeciinae-Ponerinae and the Dolichoderinae. The workers show very distinct dimorphism with "majors" being much larger than the "minors" and lacking few workers intermediate in size. The minor workers are found in the largest numbers within a nest and have small compound eyes having only about 30 ommatidia (units within the compound eye). The antennae have 12 segments, with the segments increasing gradually in size from the base to the tip. The clypeus is broad and flat, lacking any central ridge. The mouthparts show dolichoderine affinities. Outward-facing spines occur on the propodeum. The petiole node is separated from the anterior peduncle by swellings on the sides and tops. They have a well-developed sting that is similar in structure to that of the Dolichoderinae. Workers are yellow to orange in colour and the surface has striations running transversely. The queen is larger than the major and has reduced propodeal spines and a much broader head than the major worker. The pupae are characteristic in being enclosed in cocoons. They are predatory and forage mainly on the ground in leaf litter. Major workers are rare – at most two per colony. The social organization of the colony was found to be similar to that of the Dolichoderinae.

== Distribution ==
They are known from only a few areas in central Sri Lanka. In Gilimale forest, E O Wilson and other researchers found colonies mainly at the edge of forest clearings. The nests are small and have only a small number of individuals, ranging from two to a hundred. The nests are most often made mainly within rotting and crumbly wood pieces or fallen logs. The few areas in which they live are often disturbed by humans. The species has not been recorded in many of the areas where it was formerly collected and it was recommended for conservation by Wilson. A study in 1985 recorded the species at just one location, Gilimale.

"Twenty years later, one of my undergraduate students, Anula Jayasuriya, a native Sri Lankan, found the species rare or absent in the same localities. I recommended placement of Aneuretus simoni in the Red Data Book of the International Union for Conservation of Nature and Natural Resources, and in time it became one of the first of several ants to be officially classified as a threatened or endangered species."

— E. O. Wilson, from Naturalist (1994)
