= Raymond Gagné =

American entomologist (born 1935)

- Born: Raymond J. Gagné; August 27, 1935 (age 91); Meriden, Connecticut, U.S.
- Education: University of Connecticut; Iowa State University; University of Minnesota
- Occupation: Entomologist
- Scientific career
- Fields: Entomology

Raymond J. Gagné (born August 27, 1935) is an American entomologist whose work focuses on gall midges.

He was born in Meriden, Connecticut, and earned degrees from the University of Connecticut, Iowa State University, and the University of Minnesota. He has authored at least 230 scientific publications and described 68 genera and 332 species. Most of his work has been done as part of the USDA Systematic Entomological Laboratory at the Smithsonian Museum of Natural History.

The wood midge genus Gagnea was named in his honor.

== See also ==
- Category:Taxa named by Raymond J. Gagne
