= Micromyinae =

Micromyinae Temporal range: Albian–Recent

Scientific classification
- Kingdom: Animalia
- Phylum: Arthropoda
- Class: Insecta
- Order: Diptera
- Family: Cecidomyiidae
- Subfamily: Micromyinae; Rondani 1856

Subfamily of flies

Micromyinae is a subfamily of wood midges, insects in the family Cecidomyiidae. Its members were formerly included in subfamily Lestremiinae. There are at least 55 genera and more than 650 described species in Micromyinae. All species in this subfamily are mycophageous.

== Genera ==
These genera belong to the subfamily Micromyinae:

- Tribe Acoenoniini
  - Acoenonia Pritchard, 1947^{i c g}
  - †Proacoenonia Nel & Prokop, 2006 Oise amber, France, Ypresian
- Tribe Aprionini
  - Aprionus Kieffer, 1894^{c g}
  - †Corporesana Fedotova and Perkovsky 2016 Taimyr amber, Russia, Santonian
  - †Cretomycophila Fedotova and Perkovsky 2016 Taimyr amber, Russia, Santonian
  - Mycophila Felt, 1911
  - Tekomyia Mohn, 1960^{c g}
  - Tropaprionus Jaschhof & Jaschhof 2011
  - Yukawamyia Mamaev & Zaitzev, 1996^{c g}
- Tribe Bryomyiini
  - Bryomyia Kieffer, 1895^{i c g}
  - Heterogenella Mamaev, 1963^{c g}
  - Skuhraviana Mamaev, 1963^{c g}
- Tribe Campylomyzini
  - Ansifera Jaschhof, 2009
  - Campylomyza Meigen, 1818^{i c g}
  - Corinthomyia Felt, 1911^{i c g}
  - †Cretocordylomyia Gagne, 1977 Canadian amber, Campanian
  - Excrescentia Mamaev & Berest, 1991^{c g}
  - Hintelmannomyia Jaschhof, 2010
  - Micropteromyia Mamaev, 1960^{c g}
  - Neurolyga Rondani, 1840^{c g}
  - Warramyia Jaschhof, 2010
- Tribe Catochini
  - Anocha Pritchard, 1948
  - †Caputmunda Fedotova and Perkovsky 2016 Taimyr amber, Russia, Santonian
  - Catarete Edwards, 1929^{c g}
  - Catocha Haliday, 1833^{i c g b}
  - †Cretocatocha Gagné 1977 Canadian amber, Campanian
  - Forbesomyia Malloch, 1914^{i c g}
  - Neocatocha Felt, 1912^{i c g}
  - Tritozyga Loew, 1862^{i c g}
- Tribe Micromyini
  - Anodontoceras Yukawa, 1967^{c g}
  - Antennardia
  - Ladopyris
  - †Menssana Fedotova and Perkovsky 2016 Taimyr amber, Russia, Santonian
  - Micromya Rondani, 1840^{i c g}
  - Monardia Kieffer, 1895^{i c g b}
  - Polyardis Pritchard, 1947^{i c g}
  - Pseudoperomyia Jaschhof & Hippa, 1999^{c g}
- Tribe Peromyiini
  - †Cretoperomyia Fedotova and Perkovsky 2016 Taimyr amber, Russia, Santonian
  - Gagnea Jaschhof, 2001^{c g}
  - Peromyia Kieffer, 1894^{i c g b}
- Tribe Pteridomyiini
  - Pseudomonardia Jaschhof, 2003^{c g}
  - Pteridomyia Jaschhof, 2003^{c g}
- Tribe Strobliellini
  - Amedia Jaschhof, 1997^{c g b}
  - Amediella Jaschhof, 2003^{c g}
  - †Eltxo Arillo & Nel, 2000 Spanish amber, Albian^{c g}
  - Groveriella Mamaev, 1978^{c g}
  - †Palaeostrobliella Fedotova and Perkovsky 2016 Taimyr amber, Russia, Santonian
  - Strobliella Kieffer, 1898^{i c g}
  - †Yantardakhiella Fedotova and Perkovsky 2016 Taimyr amber, Russia, Santonian
  - †Zherikhiniella Fedotova and Perkovsky 2016 Taimyr amber, Russia, Santonian
- Incertae sedis
  - †Berestella Fedotova & Perkovsky, 2007
  - Ipomyia Colless, 1965^{c g}
  - Psadaria Enderlein, 1940^{c g}
  - Termitomastus Silvestri, 1901^{c g}
  - †Vicemyia Fedotova & Perkovsky, 2007 Rovno amber, Ukraine, Eocene
- Nomina dubia
  - Calospatha Kieffer, 1913^{c g}
  - Stenospatha Kieffer, 1913^{c g}
  - Tricampylomyza Kieffer, 1919^{c g}
  - Trichelospatha Kieffer, 1913^{c g}
  - Tricolpodia Kieffer, 1913

Data sources: i = ITIS, c = Catalogue of Life, g = GBIF, b = Bugguide.net
