= Paleontological Institute, Russian Academy of Sciences =

Soviet-Russian research center

Coordinates: 55°37.4333′N 37°30.8333′E

Paleontological Institute
- Палеонтологический институт РАН
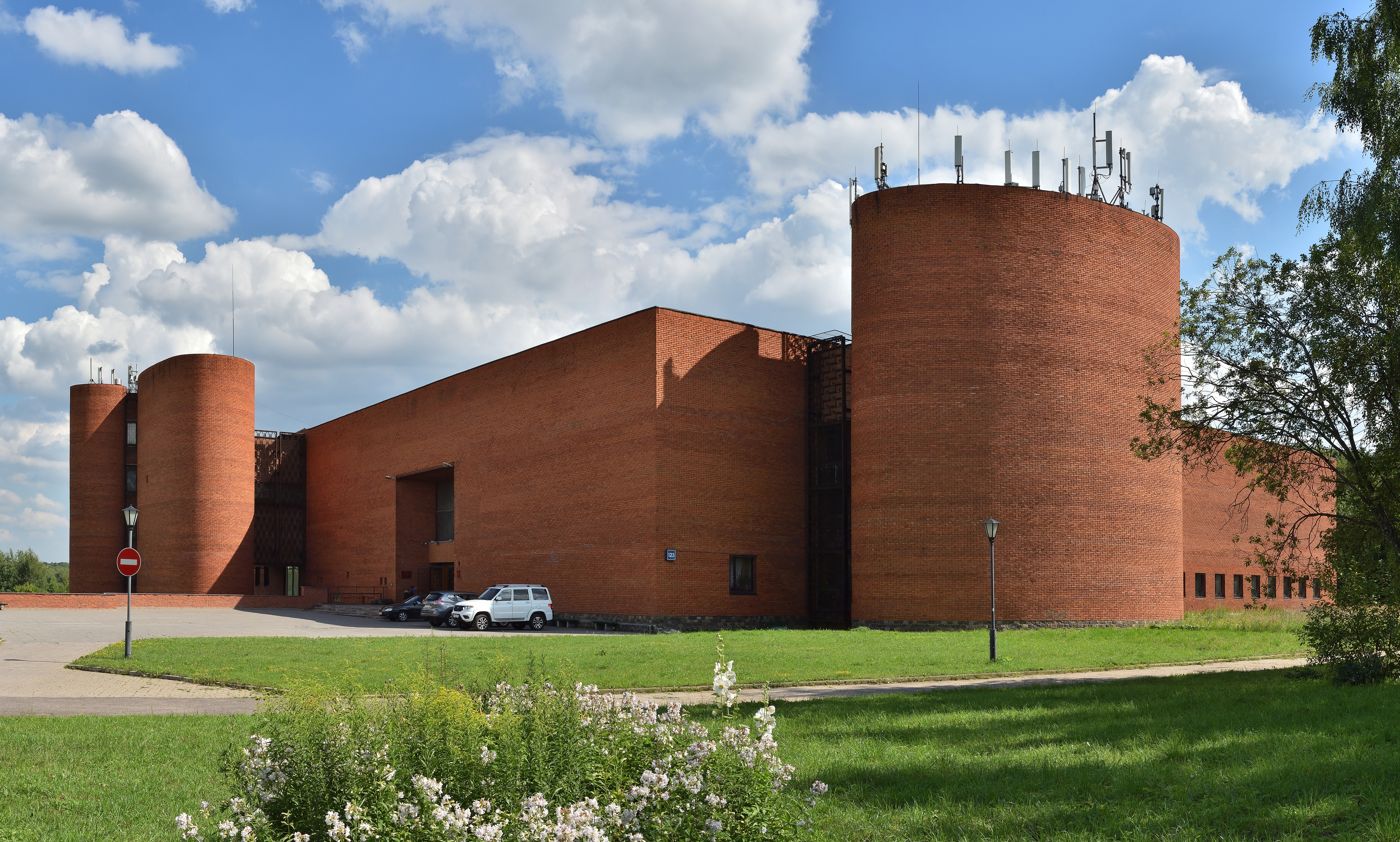
- Established: 1930
- Location: Moscow, Russia
- Website: http://www.paleo.ru/

The Paleontological Institute, Russian Academy of Sciences (PIN; Russian: Палеонтологический институт РАН) in Moscow is among a paleontological institute. An affiliate of the Russian Academy of Sciences, it includes collections from all over the former Soviet Union, as well as from other countries.

== Museum ==
The Museum of Paleontology named after Yuri Alexandrovich Orlov is run by the institute, and contains public exhibits.

During World War II, the museum operated under a skeleton staff between 1941 and 1943 as the threat of the Battle of Moscow anticipated an invasion by the German army. Some specimens were packed up to prevent damage or destruction in air raids.

== Notable staff ==
- Evgeny Maleev
- Ivan Efremov
- Alexey Bystrow
- Tatiana Dobrolyubova
- Boris Sokolov
- Kirill Eskov
- Alexandr Rasnitsyn
