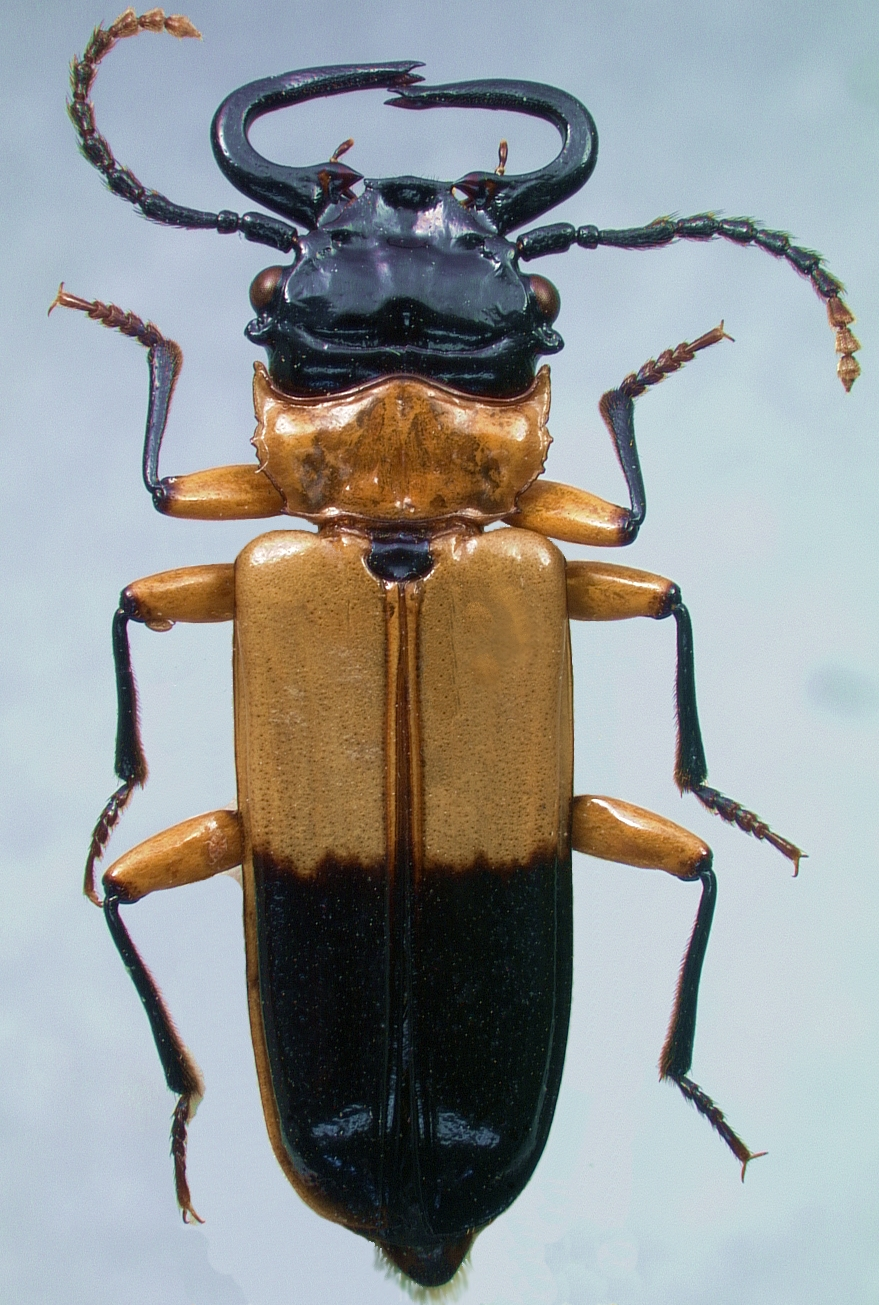
- Palaestes abruptus

Scientific classification
- Domain: Eukaryota
- Kingdom: Animalia
- Phylum: Arthropoda
- Class: Insecta
- Order: Coleoptera
- Suborder: Polyphaga
- Infraorder: Cucujiformia
- Family: Cucujidae
- Genus: Palaestes; Perty, 1830

= Palaestes =

Genus of beetles

Palaestes is a genus of beetles in the family Cucujidae. It contains eight currently recognized species. Like all members of the Cucujidae, adults are greatly dorso-ventrally compressed. All known species of Palaestes are brightly colored red or yellow and black, and the males have curiously modified mandibles that look like ice tongs; female mandibles are not modified. Palaestes shares with the Australian-New Zealand genus Platisus the character of the male genitalia, which lacks a flagellum, lying on its side in the abdomen, versus inverted in Cucujus and Pediacus.

The biology of Palaestes species is almost entirely unknown, as are the immature stages. They are presumed to be predacious like other cucujids for which the biology is better known. Specimens are uncommon in collections. The genus is confined to Central and South America. Described species are:

- Palaestes abruptus Sharp, 1899
- Palaestes freyreissi (Heyden in Maples, 1827)
- Palaestes nicaraguae Sharp, 1899
- Palaestes nigriceps Waterhouse
- Palaestes nigridens Sharp, 1899
- Palaestes scutellaris Sharp, 1899
- Palaestes tenuicornis Waterhouse
- Palaestes variipes Sharp, 1899
