= Giovanni Antonio Scopoli =

Italian physician and naturalist

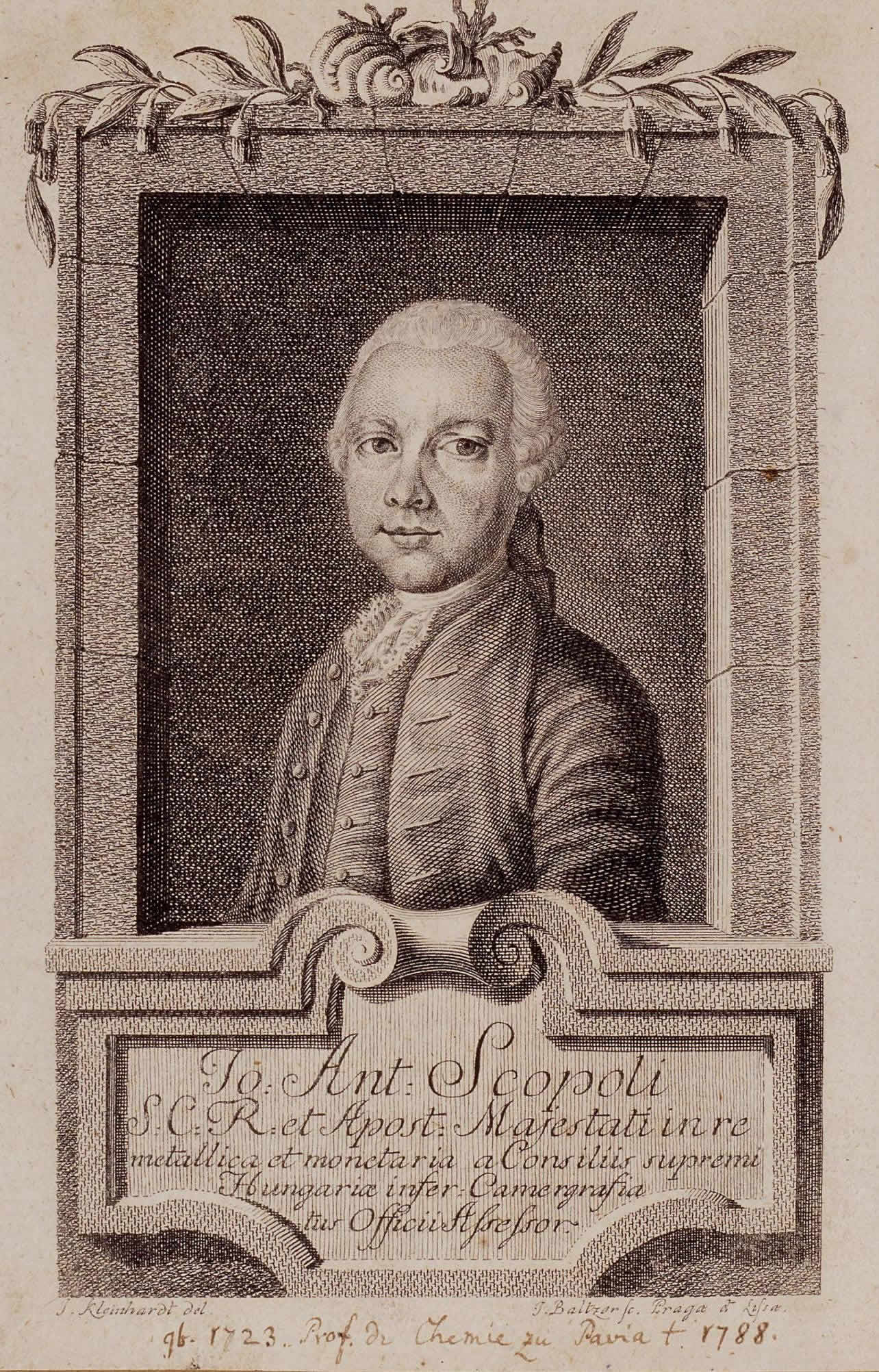
- Giovanni Antonio Scopoli
- Born: 3 June 1723; Cavalese, Val di Fiemme, Holy Roman Empire
- Died: 8 May 1788 (aged 64); Pavia
- Occupations: plant scientist, pteridologist, chemist, zoologist, ornithologist, physician, biologist, lepidopterologist, arachnologist, mycologist, earth scientist, university professor
- Scientific career
- Fields: Natural history
- Author abbrev. (botany): Scop.
- Author abbrev. (zoology): Scopoli

Giovanni Antonio Scopoli (sometimes Latinized as Johannes Antonius Scopolius) (3 June 1723 – 8 May 1788) was an Italian medical doctor and naturalist. His biographer Otto Guglia named him the "first anational European" and the "Linnaeus of the Austrian Empire".

== Biography ==
Scopoli was born at Cavalese in the Val di Fiemme, belonging to the Bishopric of Trent (today's Trentino), son of Francesco Antonio, military commissioner, and Claudia Caterina Gramola (1699-1791), a painter from a patrician family from Trentino. He obtained a degree in medicine at University of Innsbruck, and practised as a doctor in Cavalese and Venice. Much of his time was spent in the Alps, collecting plants and insects, of which he made outstanding collections.

He spent two years as private secretary to the bishop of Seckau, and then was appointed in 1754 as physician of the mercury mines in Idrija, a small town in the Habsburg realm, remaining there until 1769. In 1761, he published De Hydroargyro Idriensi Tentamina on the symptoms of mercury poisoning among mercury miners.

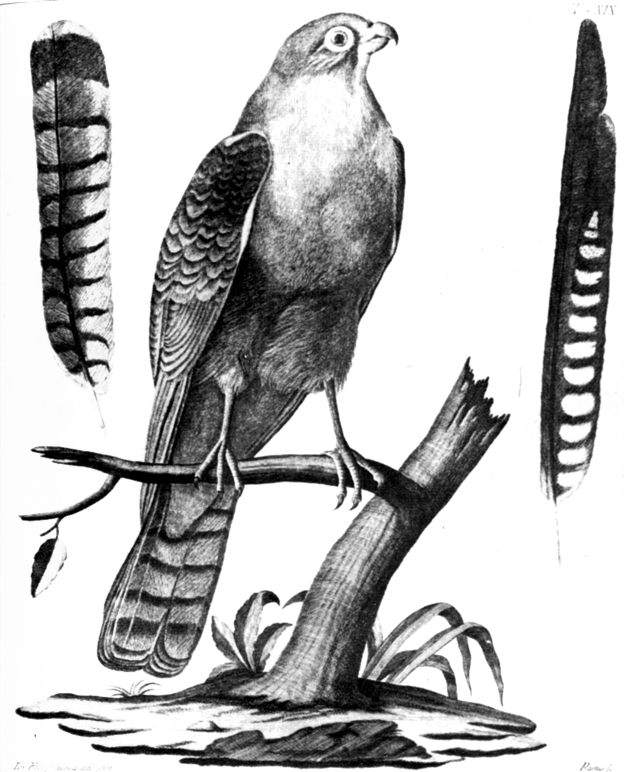
Copper engraving from the Deliciæ Floræ et Faunæ Insubricæ (1786); likely a Eurasian sparrowhawk

Scopoli spent time studying the local natural history, publishing Flora Carniolica (1760) as well as a major work on the insects of Carniola, Entomologia Carniolica (1763). He also published a series of Anni Historico-Naturales (1769–1772), which included first descriptions of birds from various collections.

In 1769, Scopoli was appointed a professor of chemistry and metallurgy at Mining Academy at Schemnitz (now Banská Štiavnica, Slovakia), and in 1777 transferred to the University of Pavia. He became a bitter rival of Lazzaro Spallanzani, who was accused of stealing specimens from the Pavia museum. Spallanzani was tried and the prolonged trial resulted in acquittal. Shortly thereafter, Scopoli died of a stroke. His last work was Deliciae Florae et Faunae Insubricae (1786–1788), which included scientific names for birds and mammals in northwestern Italy described by Pierre Sonnerat in the accounts of his voyages.

Scopoli corresponded with Carl Linnaeus, the Swedish botanist who laid the foundations of modern taxonomy. Scopoli communicated all of his research, findings, and descriptions (for example of the olm and the dormouse, two little animals hitherto unknown to Linnaeus). Linnaeus greatly respected him and showed great interest in his work. Because of a great distance, however, they never met.

Scopoli is frequently mentioned by Gilbert White in his The Natural History and Antiquities of Selborne.

== Works ==
Flora Carniolica (1760)

- Flora Carniolica (1760): a flora of Carniola, part of modern-day Slovenia

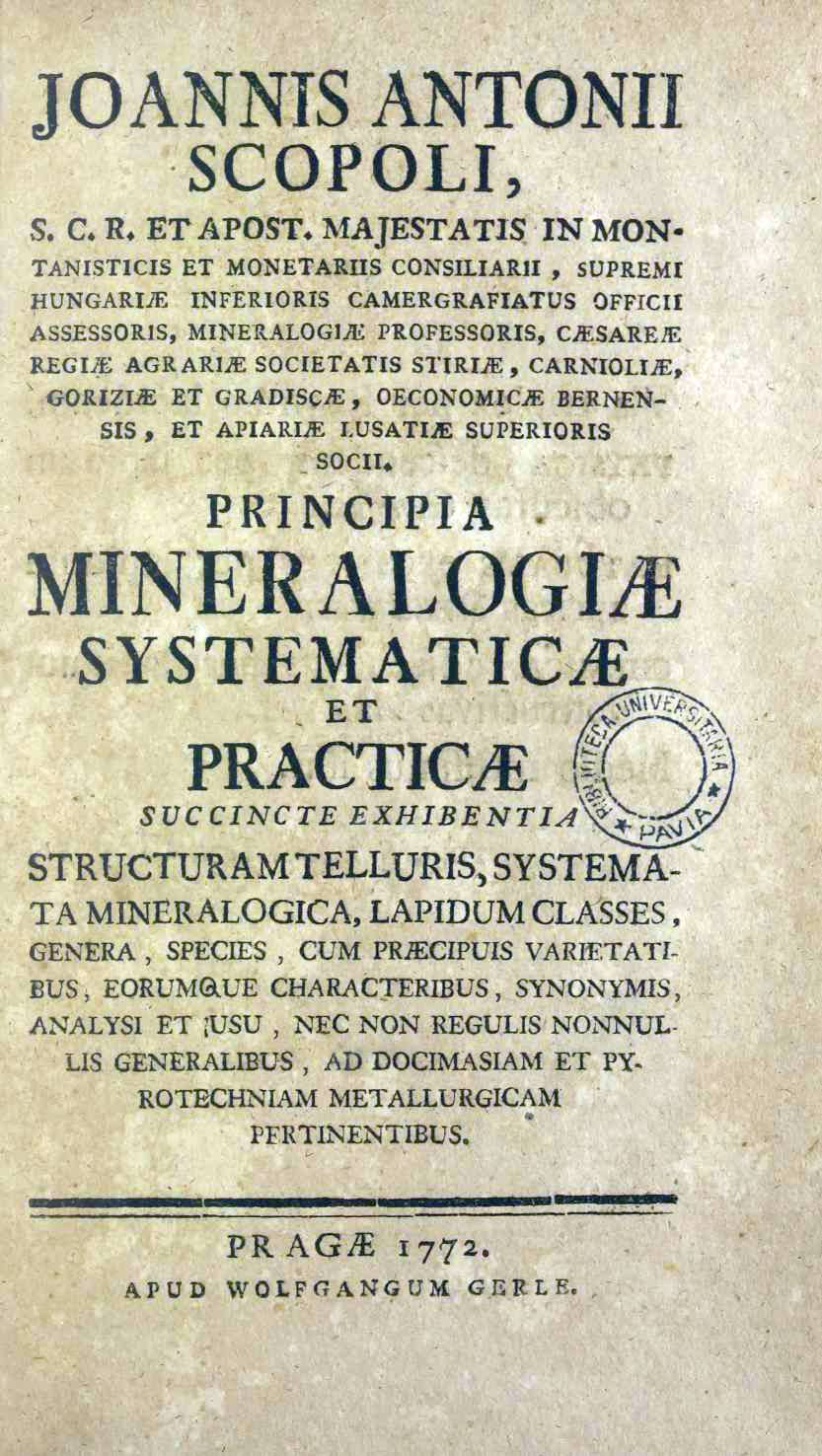
Principia mineralogiae systematicae et practicae, 1772

  - Scopoli, Giovanni Antonio (1772). Flora Carniolica exhibens plantas Carnioliae indigenas et distributas in classes, genera, species, varietates, ordine Linnaeano. Vindobonensis (Vienna): Ioannis Pauli Krauss.: A revised second edition of the first elaborate description of the flora of Carniola, undertaken when Scopoli lived in Idrija. It has 66 plates engraved by J. F. Rein after original drawings by Scopoli. Whereas the unillustrated first edition of 1760 of 600 pages had no binary names for the plant species, this edition has binary names and is written in the Linnaean tradition in all other respects as well.
- De Hydroargyro Idriensi Tentamina (1761): a medical work on the symptoms of mercury poisoning among miners.
- Entomologia Carniolica. Vienna: Trattner. (1763): a major work on entomology containing many descriptions of new species.
- Entomologia Carniolica (in Latin). Wien: Johann Thomas von Trattner (1.). 1763.
- Joh. Ant. Scopoli der Arzneywissenschaft Doktors, Ihro... Majest. Cameralphysici in der Bergstadt Idria ... Einleitung zur Kenntniß und Gebrauch der Foßilien, Hartknoch4031. Göttingen: Niedersächsische Staats- und Universitätsbibliothek Riga (1769). In German. Doctoral Thesis.
- Anni Historico-Naturales (1769–1772): This work included descriptions of new birds.
- Principia mineralogiae systematicae et practicae (in Latin). Praha: Wolfgang Gerle. 1772.
- Crystallographia Hungarica (in Latin). Praha: Wolfgang Gerle. 1776.
- Introductio ad historiam naturalem, sistens genera lapidum, plantarum et animalium hactenus detecta, caracteribus essentialibus donata, in tribus divisa, subinde ad leges naturae. Prague. (1777): masterwork of natural history describing world genera and species.
- Fundamenta Botanica Praelectionibus publicis accomodata. Papiae, S. Salvatoris (1783): A botanical classic with ten engraved plates each depicting ten to sixteen exact drawings.
- With Pierre Joseph Macquer, Dizionario di chimica del Sig. Pietro Giuseppe Macquer … Tradotto dal francese e corredato di note e di nuovi articoli... Pavia: printed at the Monastery of San Salvatore for G. Bianchi (1783–1784): The chemist Joseph Macquer's Dictionnaire de chymie, the first dictionary of theoretical and general chemistry was written it in haste and concerned about his reputation, Macquer published it anonymously in 1766. Its huge success prompted the preparation of a revised second edition (1778). Then Scopoli translated and extensively augmented it. A second edition of the translated work, without further additions was published in Venice in 1784–1785.
- Deliciae Florae et Faunae Insubricae (Ticini, 1786–1788): an account including new descriptions of the birds and mammals collected by Pierre Sonnerat on his voyages.
- Deliciae florae et faunae insubricae (in Latin). Vol. 1. Pavia: Stamperia del Monastero di S. Salvatore. 1786.
- Deliciae florae et faunae insubricae (in Latin). Vol. 2. Pavia: Stamperia del Monastero di S. Salvatore. 1786.
- Deliciae florae et faunae insubricae (in Latin). Vol. 3. Pavia: Stamperia del Monastero di S. Salvatore. 1788.

== Some taxa named by Scopoli ==
- Anser albifrons (Scopoli, 1769) Greater White-fronted Goose
- Oxyura leucocephala (Scopoli, 1769) White-headed Duck
- Calonectris diomedea (Scopoli, 1769) Scopoli's Shearwater
- Ardeola ralloides (Scopoli, 1769) Squacco Heron
- Porzana parva (Scopoli, 1769) Little Crake
- Charadrius dubius (Scopoli, 1786) Little Ringed Plover
- Tyto alba (Scopoli, 1769) Western Barn Owl
- Athene noctua (Scopoli, 1769) Little Owl
- Ptyonoprogne rupestris (Scopoli, 1769) Eurasian Crag Martin
- Prunella collaris (Scopoli, 1769) Alpine Accentor
- Emberiza melanocephala Scopoli, 1769 Black-headed Bunting
- Psittacula krameri (Scopoli, 1769) Rose-ringed Parakeet
- Emerita (genus) 1777, mole crab, sand crab, sand bug (Hippidae), East Pacific sandy seashores
- Battus (genus) 1777, Swallowtail butterfly (Papilionidae), South America
- Rhagonycha fulva 1763, soldier beetle (Cantharidae), Europe
- Cucujus cinnaberinus 1763, flat bark beetle (Cucujidae), Europe
- Osmoderma eremita 1763, hermit beetle (Scarabaeidae), Europe
- Sargus bipunctatus 1763, soldier fly species (Diptera), Europe
- Bombus pascuorum 1763, bumblebee species (Hymenoptera), Europe
- Aphis fabae 1763, bean aphid (Hemiptera), Worldwide
- Proboscidea (Order, invalid) 1763, thrips, cicadas, Hemiptera: major grouping in Entomologia Carniolica
- Amanita caesarea 1772, Caesar's mushroom (edible and highly prized)
- Laccaria laccata 1772, deceiver mushroom
- Caudata (Order, invalid), salamanders: clade as major grouping of Amphibians
- Dolichovespula sylvestris 1763, tree wasp, Europe and Asia

== Some taxa dedicated to Scopoli ==
- Scopolia, a genus of plants, and the alkaloid scopolamine isolated from such plants
- Scopolia, a genus of moths
- Cerambyx scopolii (Fuessly, 1775), a longhorn beetle (Cerambycidae), Europe
- Dorcadion scopolii (Herbst, 1784), a longhorn beetle (Cerambycidae), Europe
- Scops owl
