= C. bicolor =

C. bicolor may refer to:

- Caladium bicolor, a plant species
- Cataglyphis bicolor, the Sahara Desert ant, a desert-dwelling ant species found in the Sahara Desert
- Centruroides bicolor, a bark scorpion species found in Central America
- Coendou bicolor, the bicolored-spined porcupine, a rodent species found in Bolivia, Colombia, Ecuador and Peru
- Cucujus bicolor, a species of bark beetle in genus Cucujus

== See also ==
- Bi-color (disambiguation)
