= Catogenus thomasi =

Scientific classification
- Domain: Eukaryota
- Kingdom: Animalia
- Phylum: Arthropoda
- Class: Insecta
- Order: Coleoptera
- Suborder: Polyphaga
- Infraorder: Cucujiformia
- Family: Passandridae
- Genus: Catogenus
- Species: C. thomasi

Binomial name
- Catogenus thomasi Slipinski, 1989

Species of beetle

Catogenus thomasi is a species of parasitic flat bark beetle in the family Passandridae. It is found in North America.
