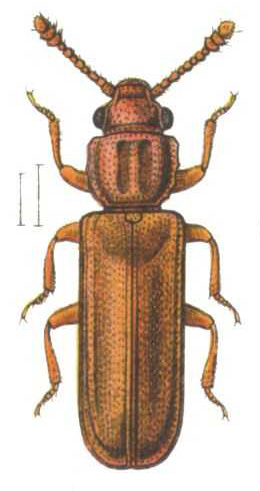

Scientific classification
- Kingdom: Animalia
- Phylum: Arthropoda
- Class: Insecta
- Order: Coleoptera
- Suborder: Polyphaga
- Infraorder: Cucujiformia
- Family: Cucujidae
- Genus: Pediacus
- Species: P. depressus

Binomial name
- Pediacus depressus (Herbst, 1797)

Synonyms
- Colydium depressum Herbst, 1797

= Pediacus depressus =

Species of beetle

Pediacus depressus is a species of flat bark beetle in the family Cucujidae. It is found in Europe and Northern Asia (excluding China).
