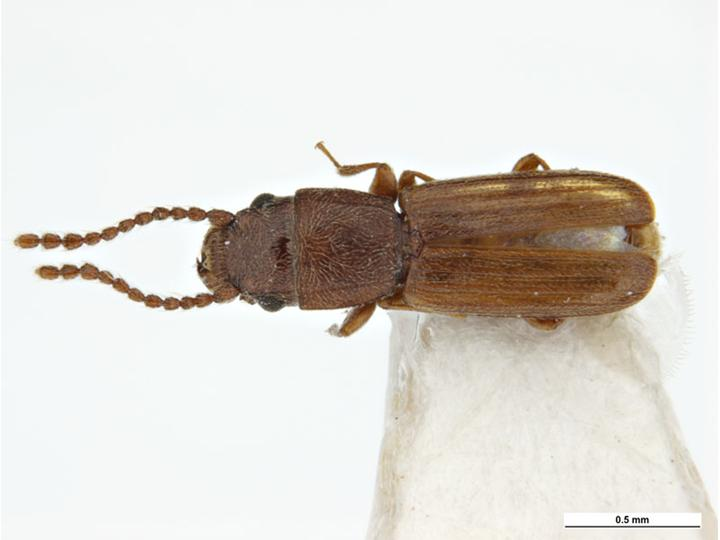

Scientific classification
- Kingdom: Animalia
- Phylum: Arthropoda
- Class: Insecta
- Order: Coleoptera
- Suborder: Polyphaga
- Infraorder: Cucujiformia
- Family: Laemophloeidae
- Genus: Cryptolestes
- Species: C. klapperichi

Binomial name
- Cryptolestes klapperichi Lefkovitch, 1962

= Cryptolestes klapperichi =

Species of beetle

Cryptolestes klapperichi, is a species of flat bark beetle widespread in the Oriental region but introduced to several parts of the world particularly through stored products.

It is found in Afghanistan, Sri Lanka, Malaysia, Indonesia, China, Hong Kong, Thailand. The museum specimens are recorded from Egypt, Ghana, Hawaii, Galapagos Islands and Saint Lucia.

Host plants include Myristica fragrans, and Manihot esculenta. In 1984, it was first intercepted in foodstuffs imported into the United States in dried chili pods from Thailand. Then in 1988, the species was observed from U.S. Virgin Islands, where a long series was collected from the ascomycete fungus Daldinia concentrica growing on a dead citrus tree.
