= Geoffrey Herford =

British entomologist

Geoffrey Vernon Brooke Herford CBE (18 November 1905 – 2 February 2000) was a British research entomologist and civil servant.

He worked mainly in the area of insect damage to food supplies. As a result of the Second World War, he became the first director of the new government Pest Infestation Laboratory, and his work continued to be focussed on the control of insects that eat stored food.

== Early life ==
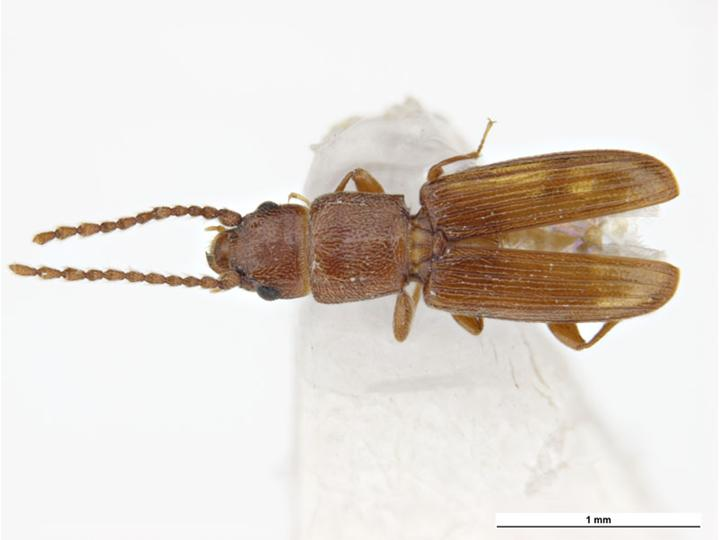
Cryptolestes turcicus, the subject of Herford's thesis

The elder son of Henry John Robberds Herford, of Hampstead, a civil servant, by his marriage to Mary Hilda Bailey, Herford was born at Hampstead and educated at Gresham's School and Magdalen College, Oxford, where he graduated BA in 1927, and then in 1931 he gained a Master of Science degree at the University of Minnesota, majoring in entomology, with some work also in botany. His thesis was on a Laemophloeidae species, Cryptolestes turcicus, and was titled "The Biology of Laemophloeus Turcicus Grouvelle, with special reference to nutrition and the effects of atmospheric humidity". He gained a Commonwealth Fund scholarship.

== Career ==
After his return from the US, Herford became a research entomologist at Imperial College, London. In 1933, he was described in the Bulletin of the Imperial Institute as "Entomologist, Stored Products Research Laboratories, Imperial College of Science and Technology". In 1938, the British government gave Sir William Beveridge the task of making preparations for securing the national food supply in the case of a major war, and he asked for the help of Professor James Munro at Imperial College. Munro believed a significant problem was insect infestations in grain stores, which were hidden by those in charge of them, and recommended "an intrusive examination of food stores". Herford was then on Munro's staff, and Munro gave him the task of conducting a grain survey. In 1940, the Ministry of Agriculture took over the Imperial College field station at Slough, which became its Pest Infestation Laboratory, and Herford was appointed as its director.

In 1946 Herford was still Officer in Charge at the Pest Infestation Laboratory, now under the control of the Department of Scientific and Industrial Research, and in the 1946 Birthday Honours he was appointed an Officer of the Order of the British Empire.

In February 1949, Herford toured Egypt, lecturing on controlling pest infestations for food storage. Between January and February 1951, he spent three weeks in Portugal, investigating the problem of pest damage to food stored there.

At the time of the 1956 Birthday Honours Herford was Deputy Chief Scientific Officer and was promoted to Commander of the Order of the British Empire.

His later work continued to be focussed on the problem of preventing insects from damaging stored food. He retired in March 1968, when he was congratulated on twenty-eight years in charge of the Pest Infestation Laboratory.

== Personal life ==
On 27 August 1933, Herford married Evelyn Cicely Lambert at Hampstead. Between 1934 and 1946 they had three daughters, Jean, Rosemary, and Kathleen, and a son, Robin.

Herford died in February 2000, aged 94.

== Selected publications ==
- G. V. B. Herford, "The more important insect pests of Cacao, Tobacco, and Dried Fruit" in Bulletin of the Imperial Institute, Volume 31 (1933)
- G. V. B. Herford, "The Pineapple Bud Moths in Hawaii", in Annals of Applied Biology, August 1934
- Gottfried Fraenkel, G. V. B. Herford, "The respiration of insects through skin" in Journal of Experimental Biology, January 1938
- L. G. Grimmett, G. V. B. Herford, "An Experiment on the Effects of γ-Radiation on the Grain Weevil" in Nature, volume 144, page 939 (2 December 1939)
- G. S. Fraenkel, G. V. B. Herford, "The physiological action of abnormally high temperatures on poikilotherm animals—II. The respiration at high sublethal and lethal temperatures" in Journal of Experimental Biology, January 1940
- G. V. B. Herford, Report on a visit to Egypt 18.2.49 - 26.2.49 (1949)
- G. V. B. Herford, "Some Research Problems in the Field of Stored Products Entomology" in Perspectives in Public Health, November 1950
- G. V. B. Herford, "New Developments in the Control of Insects Infesting Foodstuffs" in Perspectives in Public Health, July 1953
- G. V. B. Herford, "Recent Developments in the Protection of Foodstuffs from Insect Pests: with special reference to Commonwealth countries" in Journal of the Royal Society of Arts, Vol. 110, No. 5070, May 1962, pp. 423–438

== Honours ==
- June 1946: OBE
- May 1956: CBE
