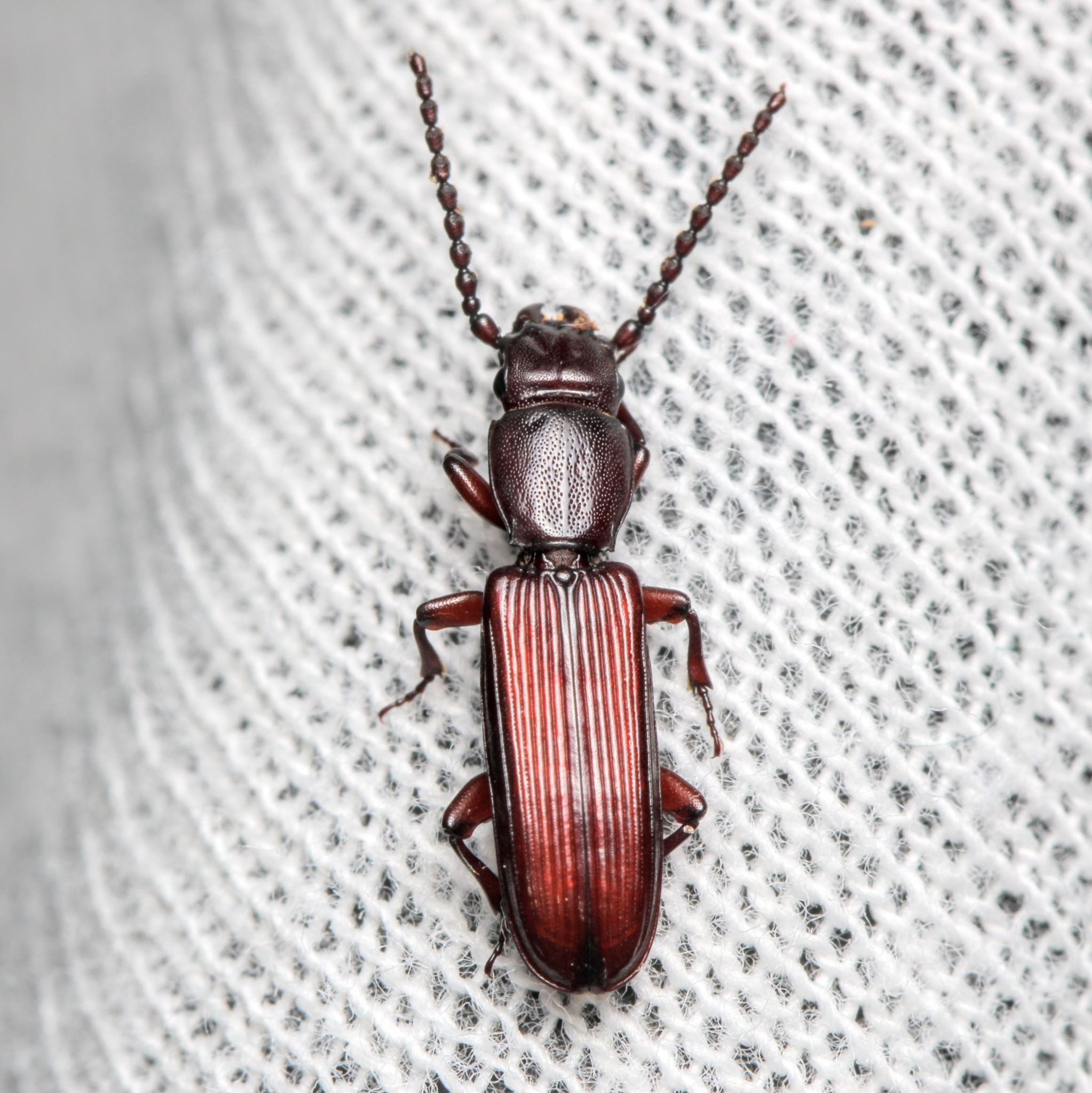

Scientific classification
- Kingdom: Animalia
- Phylum: Arthropoda
- Class: Insecta
- Order: Coleoptera
- Suborder: Polyphaga
- Infraorder: Cucujiformia
- Family: Passandridae
- Genus: Catogenus
- Species: C. rufus

Binomial name
- Catogenus rufus (Fabricius, 1798)

Synonyms
- Catogenus monilicornis Casey, 1916; Catogenus parvus Casey, 1916; Catogenus puncticeps Casey, 1916; Catogenus puncticollis Newman, 1839

= Catogenus rufus =

Species of beetle

Catogenus rufus is a species of parasitic flat bark beetle in the family Passandridae. It is found in North America.
