= Pediacus fuscus =

Scientific classification
- Kingdom: Animalia
- Phylum: Arthropoda
- Class: Insecta
- Order: Coleoptera
- Suborder: Polyphaga
- Infraorder: Cucujiformia
- Family: Cucujidae
- Genus: Pediacus
- Species: P. fuscus

Binomial name
- Pediacus fuscus Erichson, 1845

Synonyms
- Pediacus planus (LeConte, 1850); Pediacus subcarinatus Mannerheim, 1852; Silvanus planus LeConte, 1850

Species of beetle

Pediacus fuscus is a species of flat bark beetle in the family Cucujidae. It is found in Europe and Northern Asia (excluding China) and North America.
