= Pediacus stephani =

Scientific classification
- Kingdom: Animalia
- Phylum: Arthropoda
- Class: Insecta
- Order: Coleoptera
- Suborder: Polyphaga
- Infraorder: Cucujiformia
- Family: Cucujidae
- Genus: Pediacus
- Species: P. stephani

Binomial name
- Pediacus stephani Thomas, 2004

Species of beetle

Pediacus stephani is a species of flat bark beetle in the family Cucujidae. It is found in North America.
