= Passandrina =

Scientific classification
- Kingdom: Animalia
- Phylum: Arthropoda
- Class: Insecta
- Order: Coleoptera
- Suborder: Polyphaga
- Infraorder: Cucujiformia
- Family: Passandridae
- Genus: Passandrina

Genus of beetles

Passandrina is a genus of beetles in the family Passandridae.

== Species ==
- Passandrina egregia Reitter, 1878
- Passandrina striblingi Burckhardt & Slipinski
