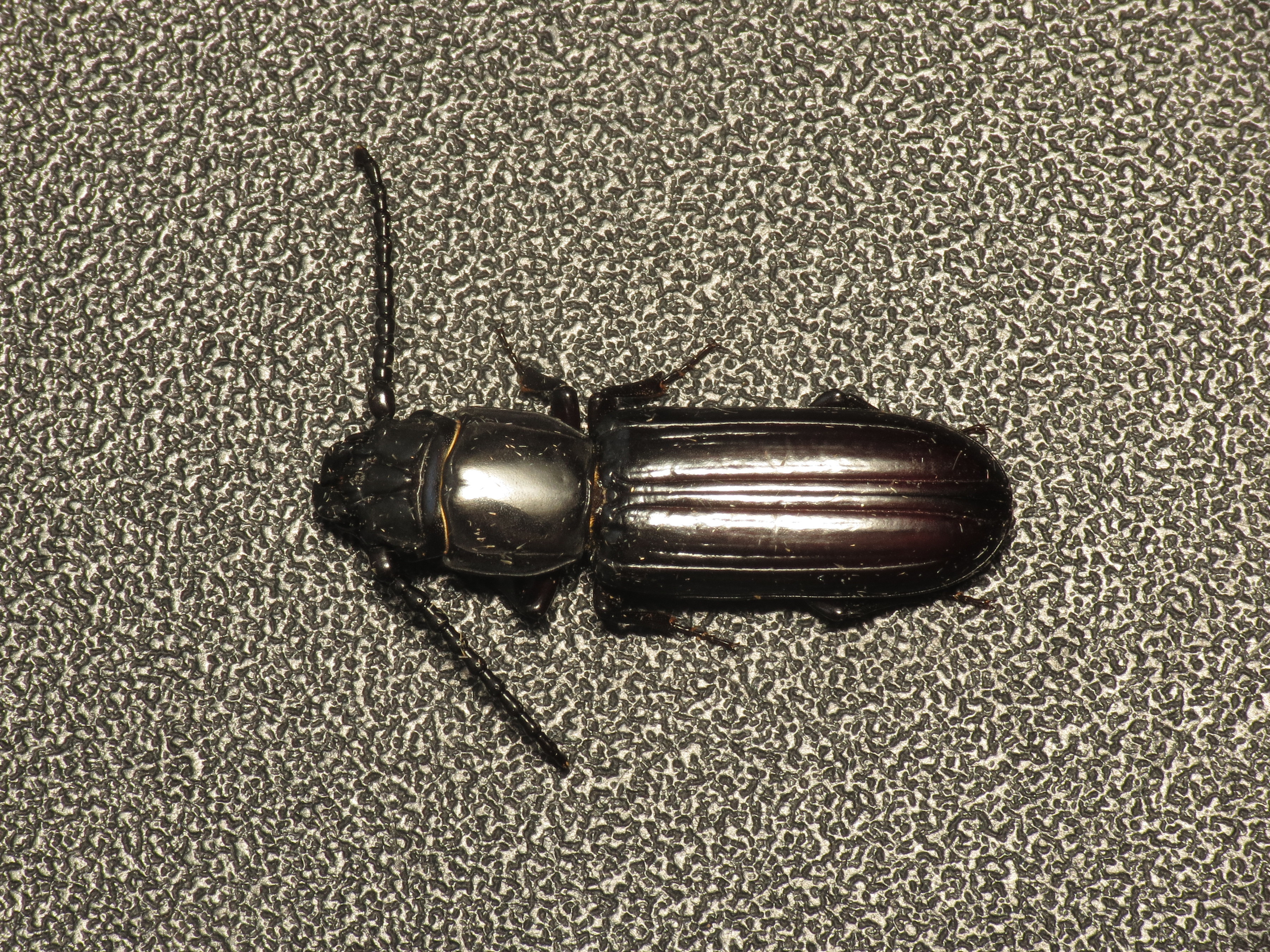
- Passandra sp.

Scientific classification
- Kingdom: Animalia
- Phylum: Arthropoda
- Class: Insecta
- Order: Coleoptera
- Suborder: Polyphaga
- Infraorder: Cucujiformia
- Family: Passandridae
- Genus: Passandra

= Passandra =

Genus of beetles

Passandra is a genus of beetles in the family Passandridae.

== Species ==
- Passandra apicalis Grouvelle
- Passandra blanchardi Grouvelle
- Passandra doriai Grouvelle
- Passandra elongatula Grouvelle
- Passandra fasciata Gray
- Passandra gemellipara Newman
- Passandra gigas Fabricius
- Passandra goudoti Grouvelle
- Passandra harmandi Grouvelle
- Passandra heros Fabricius
- Passandra kasiae Slipinski
- Passandra lineicollis Reitter
- Passandra marginata Grouvelle
- Passandra murrayi Grouvelle
- Passandra nodicornis Snellen
- Passandra oblongicollis Fairmaire
- Passandra penicillata Waterhouse
- Passandra popeorum Slipinski
- Passandra punctulicollis Fairmaire
- Passandra quadrilineata Smith
- Passandra rufipennis Fabricius
- Passandra sagena Lefkovitch
- Passandra semifusca Newman
- Passandra sexstriata Dalman
- Passandra simplex Murray
- Passandra tenuicornis Grouvelle
- Passandra trigemina Newman
- Passandra uniformis Waterhouse
- Passandra waterhousei Grouvelle
- Passandra zairensis Slipinski
