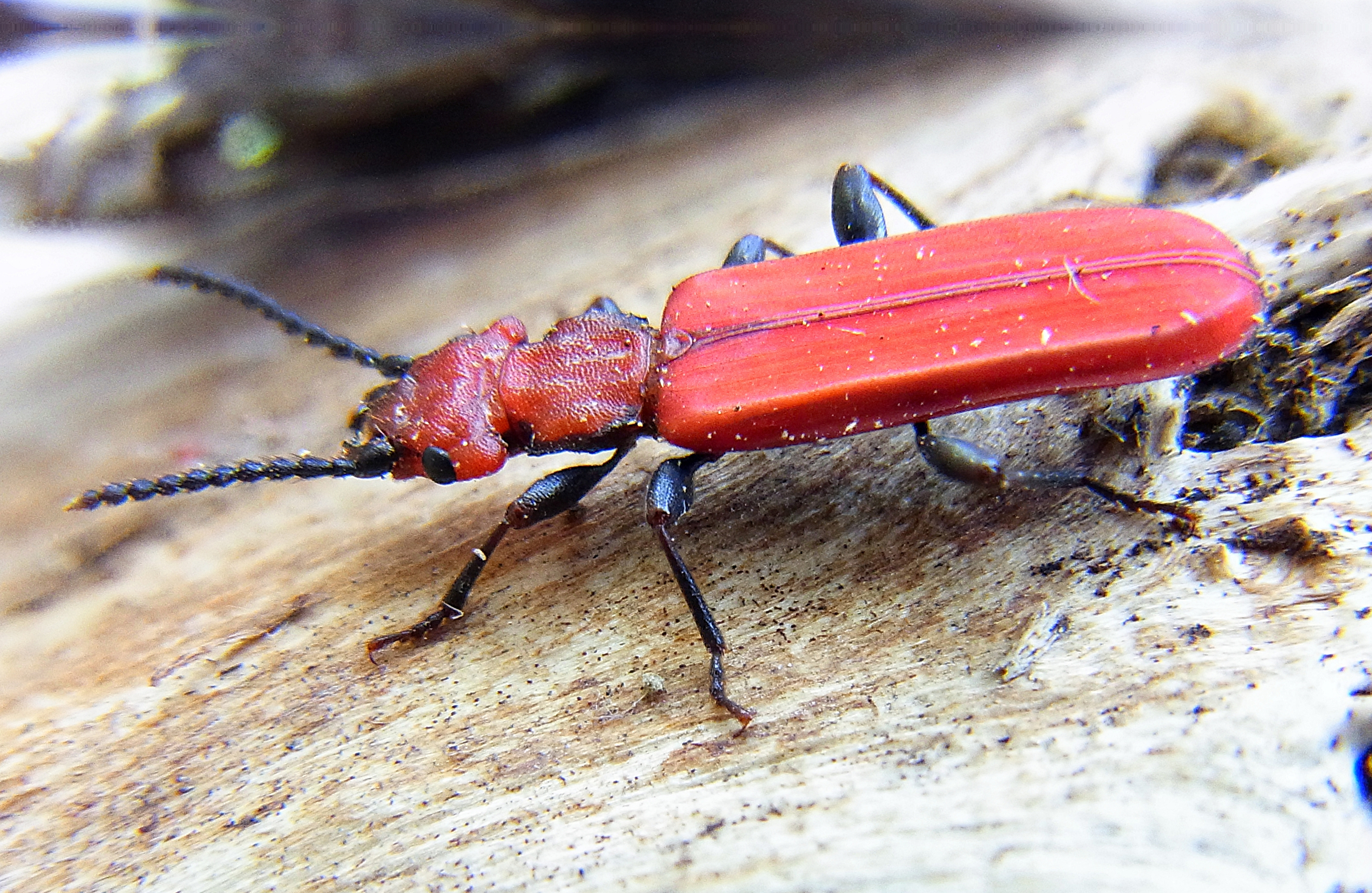

Conservation status
- Near Threatened (IUCN 3.1)

Scientific classification
- Kingdom: Animalia
- Phylum: Arthropoda
- Class: Insecta
- Order: Coleoptera
- Suborder: Polyphaga
- Infraorder: Cucujiformia
- Family: Cucujidae
- Genus: Cucujus
- Species: C. cinnaberinus

Binomial name
- Cucujus cinnaberinus (Scopoli, 1763)

Synonyms
- Cucujus depressus Cucujus geniculatus Cucujus sanguinolentus Cantharis sanguinolentus

= Cucujus cinnaberinus =

Species of beetle

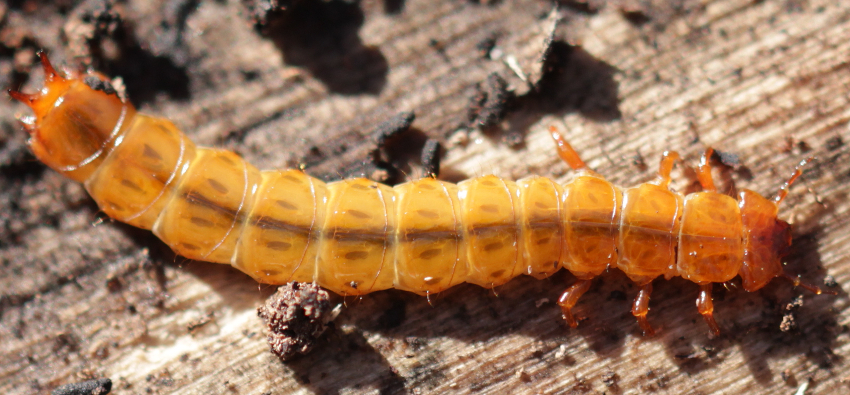
Larva of Cucujus cinnaberinus

Cucujus cinnaberinus is a species of beetles in the family Cucujidae, the flat bark beetles. It is native to Europe, being most common in Central Europe and rare in much of Southern and Western Europe.

This beetle lives under tree bark. It is associated with oaks (Quercus spp.), maples (Acer spp.), and poplars (Populus spp.). It can be found in various habitat types, including forests and urban areas. It is a saproxylic species, often feeding on decomposing wood. It has also been observed eating maggots and the larvae of other beetles.

This beetle is on the IUCN Red List as a near-threatened species. It is on many national lists of threatened species in Europe. Forest management practices include the removal of dead wood and dying trees, reducing available habitat and food sources for the beetle.
