= Catogenus =

Scientific classification
- Kingdom: Animalia
- Phylum: Arthropoda
- Class: Insecta
- Order: Coleoptera
- Suborder: Polyphaga
- Infraorder: Cucujiformia
- Family: Passandridae
- Genus: Catogenus

Genus of beetles

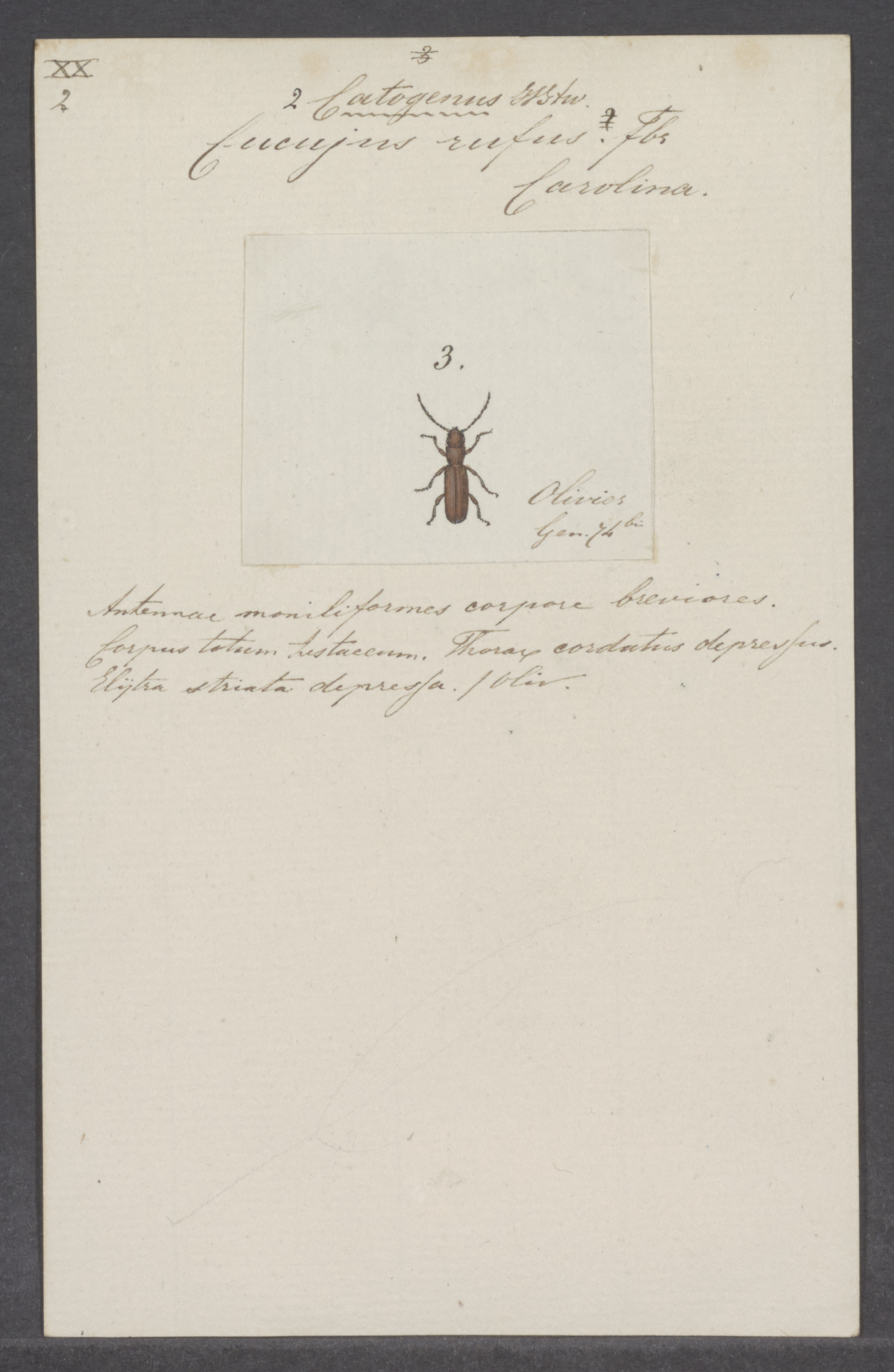

Catogenus is a genus of beetles in the family Passandridae.

== Species ==
- Catogenus acutangulus Reitter
- Catogenus asper Slipinski
- Catogenus castaneus Perty
- Catogenus cayman Slipinski
- Catogenus collaris Sharp
- Catogenus cylindricollis Lacordaire
- Catogenus darlingtoni Slipinski
- Catogenus decoratus Grouvelle
- Catogenus depressus Slipinski
- Catogenus gracilicornis Slipinski
- Catogenus grouvellei Slipinski
- Catogenus lebasii Grouvelle
- Catogenus longicornis Grouvelle
- Catogenus planus Reitter
- Catogenus rufus Fabricius
- Catogenus slipinskii Thomas
- Catogenus temacensis Sharp
- Catogenus thomasi Slipinski
