= Aulonosoma =

Scientific classification
- Kingdom: Animalia
- Phylum: Arthropoda
- Class: Insecta
- Order: Coleoptera
- Suborder: Polyphaga
- Infraorder: Cucujiformia
- Family: Passandridae
- Genus: Aulonosoma

Genus of beetles

Aulonosoma is a genus of beetles in the family Passandridae.

== Species ==
- Aulonosoma basalis Grouvelle
- Aulonosoma insignis Grouvelle
- Aulonosoma tenebrioides Motschulsky
