= Cucujus bicolor =

Scientific classification
- Kingdom: Animalia
- Phylum: Arthropoda
- Clade: Pancrustacea
- Class: Insecta
- Order: Coleoptera
- Suborder: Polyphaga
- Infraorder: Cucujiformia
- Family: Cucujidae
- Genus: Cucujus
- Species: C. bicolor

Binomial name
- Cucujus bicolor Smith, 1851

Synonyms
- Cucujus sanguinolentus Hope in Gray, 1831

Species of beetle

Cucujus bicolor is a species of beetle in the family Cucujidae, known as the flat bark beetles. It was discovered and described by Fredrick William Smith in 1851. They can only be found in India, Myanmar, and Nepal.

== Description ==
It is most commonly known for its vibrant, bright red appearance. It has a long, flat body, typically 6–25 mm (0.24–0.98 in) in length.
