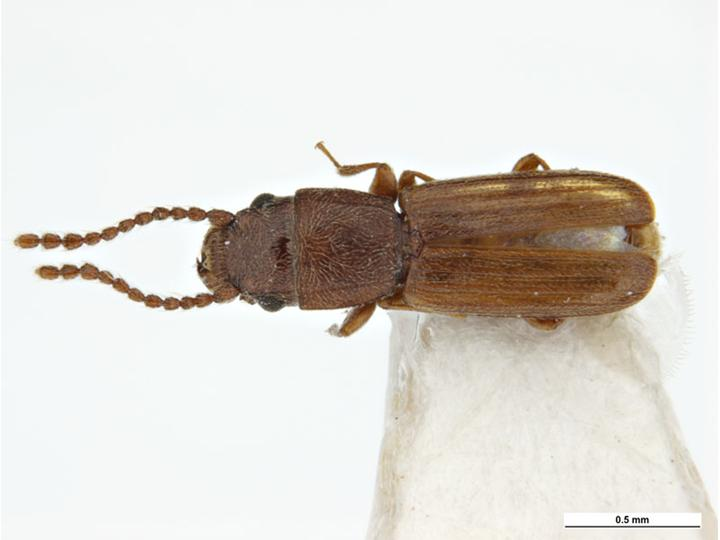
- Cryptolestes klapperichi

Scientific classification
- Domain: Eukaryota
- Kingdom: Animalia
- Phylum: Arthropoda
- Class: Insecta
- Order: Coleoptera
- Suborder: Polyphaga
- Infraorder: Cucujiformia
- Family: Laemophloeidae
- Genus: Cryptolestes; Ganglbauer, 1899

= Cryptolestes =

Genus of beetles

Cryptolestes is a genus of beetles in the family Laemophloeidae. Several species are known as economically important pests of stored products, especially food grains. The four most notorious species are Cryptolestes ferrugineus, Cryptolestes pusilloides, Cryptolestes pusillus, and Cryptolestes turcicus. C. capensis, C. klapperichi, and C. ugandae are less widespread pests. Species in this genus can be hard to distinguish from one another, and definitive identification often requires close examination of the genitalia.

Species include:

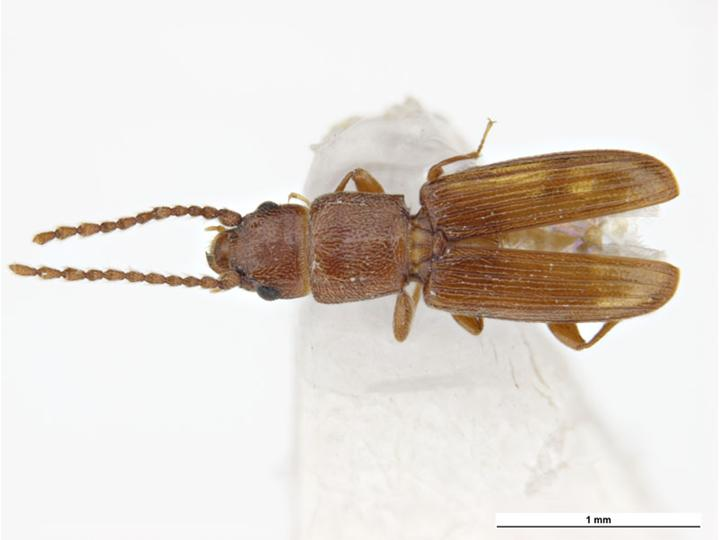
Cryptolestes turcicus

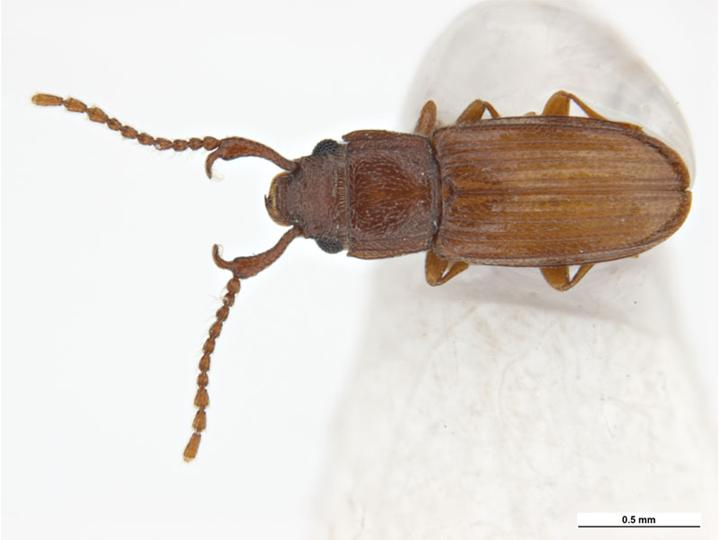
Cryptolestes uncicornis

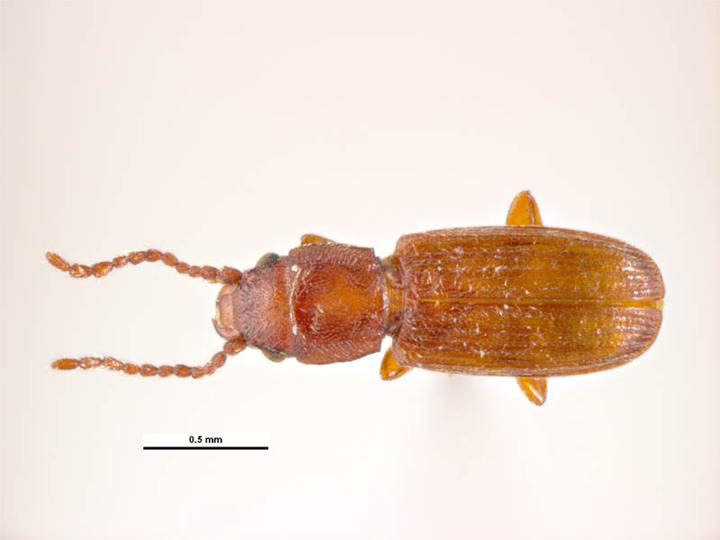
Cryptolestes ferrugineus

- Cryptolestes abietis Wankowicz
- Cryptolestes ampiyacus Thomas
- Cryptolestes atuloides Lefkovitch
- Cryptolestes atulus Lefkovitch
- Cryptolestes beccarii Grouvelle
- Cryptolestes bicolor Chevrolat
- Cryptolestes biskrensis Grouvelle
- Cryptolestes brunneus Lefkovitch
- Cryptolestes calabozus Thomas
- Cryptolestes candius Lefkovitch
- Cryptolestes capensis Waltl
- Cryptolestes capillulus Thomas
- Cryptolestes cornutus Thomas & Zimmerman
- Cryptolestes corticinus Erichson
- Cryptolestes curus Lefkovitch
- Cryptolestes diemenensis Blackburn
- Cryptolestes divaricatus Grouvelle
- Cryptolestes duplicatus Waltl
- Cryptolestes dybasi Thomas
- Cryptolestes evansi Lefkovitch
- Cryptolestes fauveli Grouvelle
- Cryptolestes ferrugineus Stephens – rusty grain beetle
- Cryptolestes fractipennis Motschulsky
- Cryptolestes fursovi Iablokoff-Khnzorian
- Cryptolestes halevyae Thomas
- Cryptolestes incertus Grouvelle
- Cryptolestes inyoensis
- Cryptolestes klapperichi Lefkovitch
- Cryptolestes lepesmei Villiers
- Cryptolestes mexicanus Thomas
- Cryptolestes minimus Lefkovitch
- Cryptolestes obesus
- Cryptolestes planulatus Grouvelle
- Cryptolestes pubescens Casey
- Cryptolestes punctatus LeConte
- Cryptolestes pusilloides Steel & Howe
- Cryptolestes pusillus Schonherr – flat grain beetle
- Cryptolestes robinclarkei
- Cryptolestes schwarzi Casey
- Cryptolestes spartii Curtis
- Cryptolestes spatulifer Thomas
- Cryptolestes spectabilis
- Cryptolestes trinidadensis Thomas
- Cryptolestes turcicus Grouvelle – flour mill beetle
- Cryptolestes turnbowi
- Cryptolestes ugandae Steel & Howe
- Cryptolestes uncicornis Reitter
- Cryptolestes weisei Reitter
