= Ancistria =

Scientific classification
- Kingdom: Animalia
- Phylum: Arthropoda
- Class: Insecta
- Order: Coleoptera
- Suborder: Polyphaga
- Infraorder: Cucujiformia
- Family: Passandridae
- Genus: Ancistria

Genus of beetles

Ancistria is a genus of beetles in the family Passandridae.

== Species ==
- Ancistria alternans Grouvelle
- Ancistria apicalis Reitter
- Ancistria assamensis Burckhardt & Slipinski
- Ancistria bakeri Kessel
- Ancistria basseti Burckhardt & Slipinski
- Ancistria beccarii Grouvelle
- Ancistria bicolorata Burckhardt & Ślipiński, 1995
- Ancistria bostrychoides Grouvelle
- Ancistria bouchardi Grouvelle
- Ancistria brancuccii Burckhardt & Slipinski
- Ancistria concava Burckhardt & Slipinski
- Ancistria cornuta Burckhardt & Slipinski
- Ancistria costata Burckhardt & Slipinski
- Ancistria emarginata Grouvelle
- Ancistria fabricii Reitter
- Ancistria foraminifrons Burckhardt & Slipinski
- Ancistria grouvellei Burckhardt & Slipinski
- Ancistria indica Burckhardt & Slipinski
- Ancistria kurosawai Sasaji
- Ancistria lewisi Reitter
- Ancistria limbata Pan, 2024
- Ancistria longicapitata Burckhardt & Slipinski
- Ancistria longior Pan, 2024
- Ancistria micros Grouvelle
- Ancistria nepalensis Burckhardt & Slipinski
- Ancistria nicolettae Burckhardt & Slipinski
- Ancistria papuana Burckhardt & Slipinski
- Ancistria pilosa Burckhardt & Slipinski
- Ancistria reitteri Lewis
- Ancistria retusa Fabricius
- Ancistria stricta Grouvelle
- Ancistria strigosa Grouvelle
- Ancistria tarsalis Waterhouse
- Ancistria tenera Gunther
- Ancistria tenuis Grouvelle
