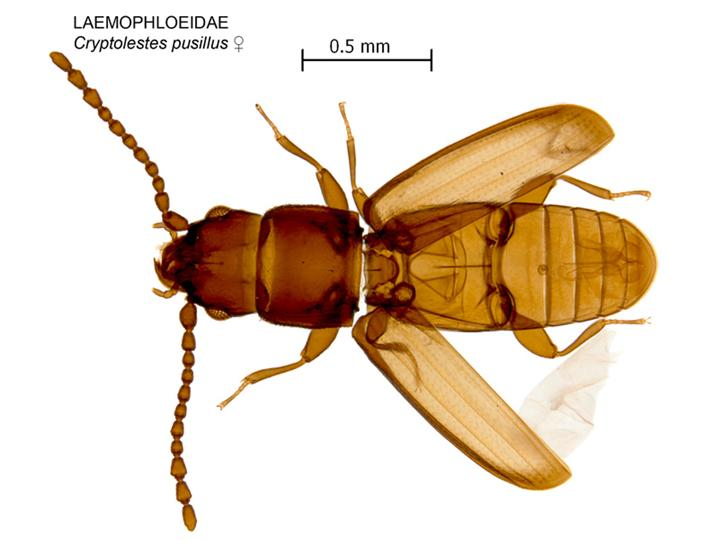

Scientific classification
- Domain: Eukaryota
- Kingdom: Animalia
- Phylum: Arthropoda
- Class: Insecta
- Order: Coleoptera
- Suborder: Polyphaga
- Infraorder: Cucujiformia
- Family: Laemophloeidae
- Genus: Cryptolestes
- Species: C. pusillus

Binomial name
- Cryptolestes pusillus (Schönherr, 1817)

Synonyms
- Cryptolestes minutus (Olivier, 1791); Cucujus minutus Olivier,1791; Cryptolestes crassicornis (Waltl, 1839); Laemophloeus crassicornis Waltl, 1839; Cryptolestes longicornis (Mannerheim, 1843); Laemophloeus longicornis Mannerheim, 1843; Cryptolestes brevis (Fairmaire, 1850); Laemophloeus brevis Fairmaire, 1850; Cryptolestes parallelus (Smith, 1851); Laemophloeus parallelus Smith, 1851; Cryptolestes puberulus (LeConte, 1854); Laemophloeus puberulus LeConte, 1854; Cryptolestes pauper (Sharp, 1899); Laemophloeus pauper Sharp, 1899; Cryptolestes testaceus (Stephens, 1831); Cucujus testaceus Stephens, 1831

= Cryptolestes pusillus =

Species of beetle

Cryptolestes pusillus is a species of lined flat bark beetle native to Europe. It is also known as the flat grain beetle. It feeds on grain products, and is considered a pest in Canada.

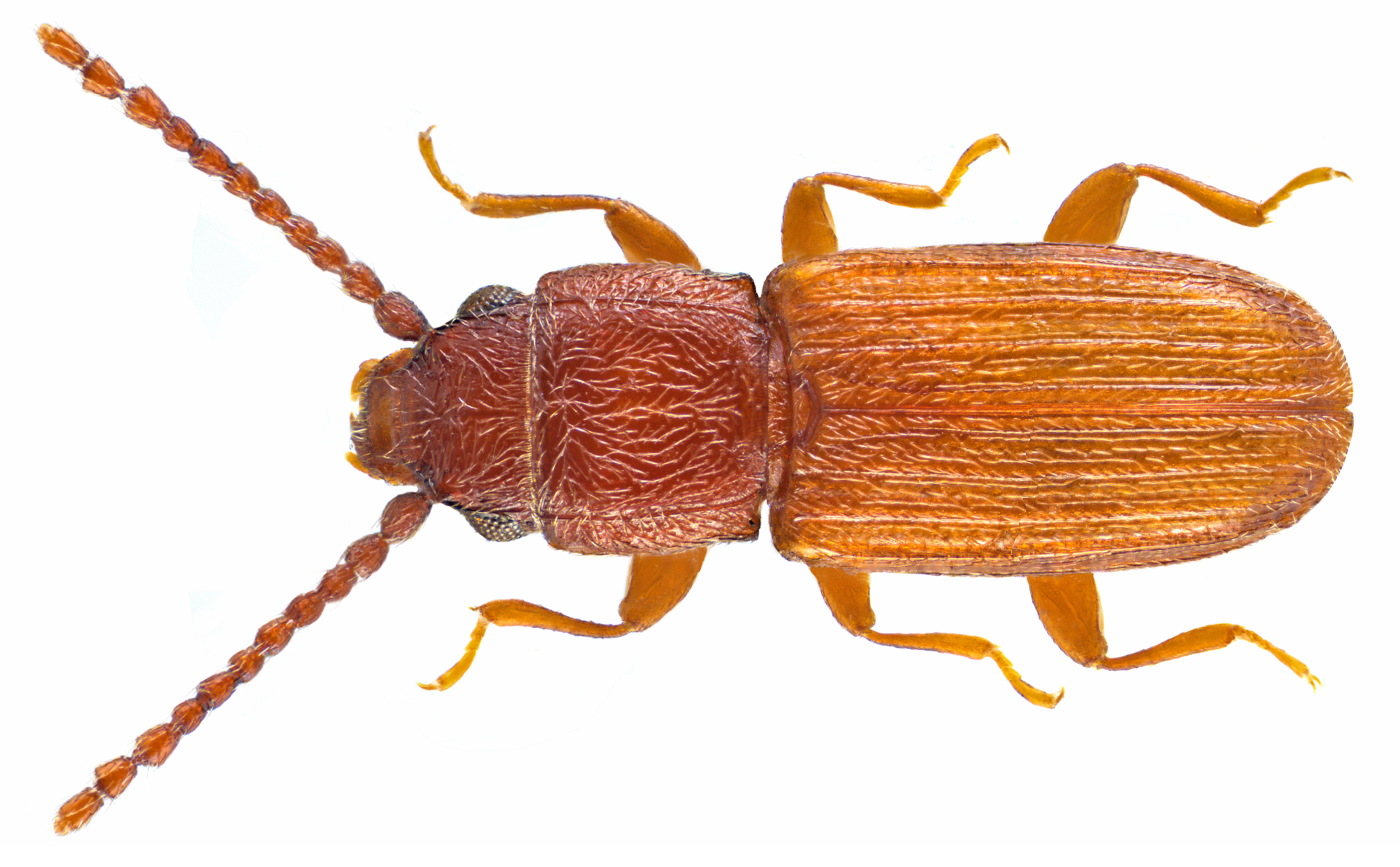
