= Scalidiopsis =

Scientific classification
- Kingdom: Animalia
- Phylum: Arthropoda
- Class: Insecta
- Order: Coleoptera
- Suborder: Polyphaga
- Infraorder: Cucujiformia
- Family: Passandridae
- Genus: Scalidiopsis; Burckhardt & Slipinski, 1991
- Species: S. youngi

Binomial name
- Scalidiopsis youngi Burckhardt & Slipinski, 1991

Species of beetle

Scalidiopsis youngi is a species of beetles in the family Passandridae, and the only species in the genus Scalidiopsis. It was described by Burckhardt and Slipinski in 1991.
