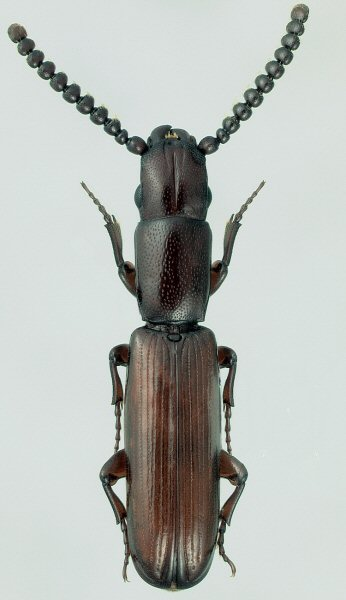
- Taphroscelidia linearis

Scientific classification
- Domain: Eukaryota
- Kingdom: Animalia
- Phylum: Arthropoda
- Class: Insecta
- Order: Coleoptera
- Suborder: Polyphaga
- Infraorder: Cucujiformia
- Family: Passandridae
- Genus: Taphroscelidia; Crotch 1873

= Taphroscelidia =

Genus of beetles

Taphroscelidia is a genus of beetles in the family Passandridae.

== Species ==
- Taphroscelidia atra Grouvelle
- Taphroscelidia atratula Grouvelle
- Taphroscelidia contorta Burckhardt & Slipinski
- Taphroscelidia dentata Burckhardt & Slipinski
- Taphroscelidia filum Reitter
- Taphroscelidia gounellei Grouvelle
- Taphroscelidia humeralis Grouvelle
- Taphroscelidia linearis Leconte
- Taphroscelidia nigra Burckhardt
- Taphroscelidia postica Grouvelle
- Taphroscelidia rostrata Sharp
- Taphroscelidia semicastanea Reitter
- Taphroscelidia sharpi Grouvelle
- Taphroscelidia tenuissima Reitter
