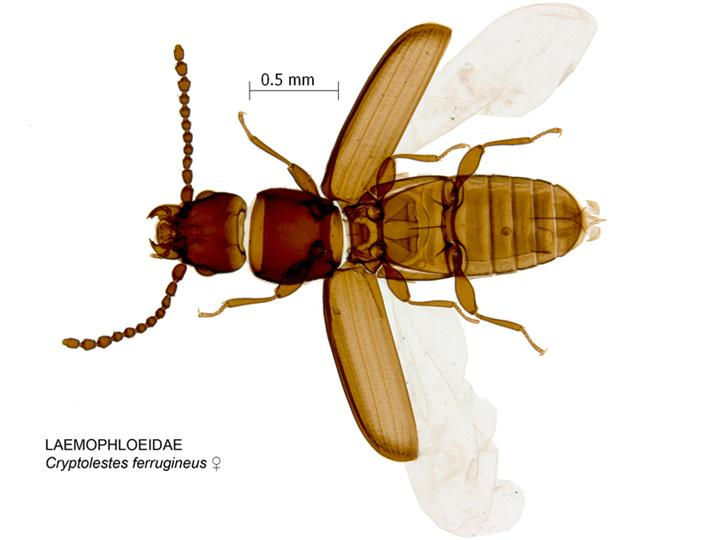

Scientific classification
- Kingdom: Animalia
- Phylum: Arthropoda
- Clade: Pancrustacea
- Class: Insecta
- Order: Coleoptera
- Suborder: Polyphaga
- Infraorder: Cucujiformia
- Family: Laemophloeidae
- Genus: Cryptolestes
- Species: C. ferrugineus

Binomial name
- Cryptolestes ferrugineus (Stephens, 1831)

Synonyms
- Cryptolestes carinulatus (Wollaston, 1877); Cryptolestes concolor (Smith, 1851); Cryptolestes emgei (Reitter, 1887); Cryptolestes obsoletus (Smith, 1851); Cryptolestes testaceus (Paykull, 1800); Cryptolestes monilicornis (Stephens, 1831); Cucujus ferrugineus Stephens, 1831; Cucujus monilicornis Stephens, 1831; Cucujus testaceus Paykull, 1800; Laemophloeus carinulatus Wollaston, 1877; Laemophloeus concolor Smith, 1851; Laemophloeus emgei Reitter, 1887; Laemophloeus obsoletus Smith, 1851

= Cryptolestes ferrugineus =

Species of beetle

Cryptolestes ferrugineus is a 1.5-2.5 mm long species of lined flat bark beetle, possibly native to Europe. It currently has a cosmopolitan distribution, and is referred to by the common name the rusty grain beetle. It is one of the most common pests of stored grains, grain products, dry plants and dry plant products.
