= Cryptolestes punctatus =

Scientific classification
- Domain: Eukaryota
- Kingdom: Animalia
- Phylum: Arthropoda
- Class: Insecta
- Order: Coleoptera
- Suborder: Polyphaga
- Infraorder: Cucujiformia
- Family: Laemophloeidae
- Genus: Cryptolestes
- Species: C. punctatus

Binomial name
- Cryptolestes punctatus (LeConte, 1854)

Synonyms
- Cryptolestes adumbratus Casey, 1916; Cryptolestes extricatus (Casey, 1884); Cryptolestes geminatus (LeConte, 1854); Laemophloeus extricatus Casey, 1884; Laemophloeus geminatus LeConte, 1854; Laemophloeus punctatus LeConte, 1854

Species of beetle

Cryptolestes punctatus is a species of lined flat bark beetle in the family Laemophloeidae. It is found in North America.
