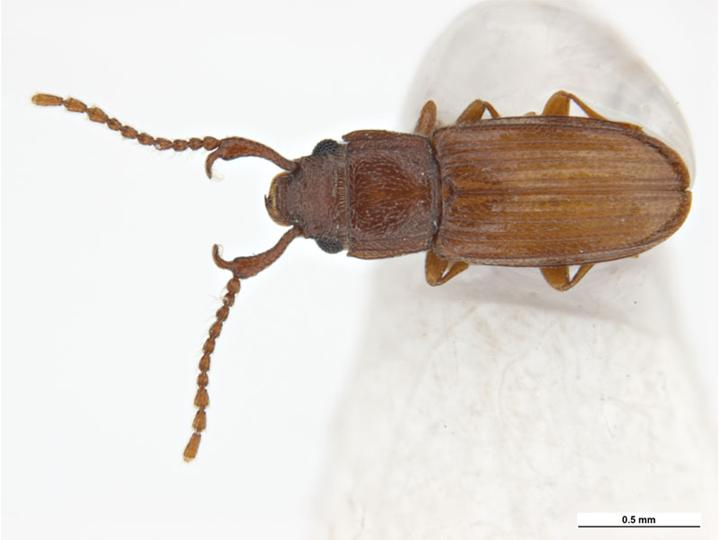

Scientific classification
- Kingdom: Animalia
- Phylum: Arthropoda
- Class: Insecta
- Order: Coleoptera
- Suborder: Polyphaga
- Infraorder: Cucujiformia
- Family: Laemophloeidae
- Genus: Cryptolestes
- Species: C. uncicornis

Binomial name
- Cryptolestes uncicornis (Reitter, 1874)

Synonyms
- Cryptolestes addendus (Sharp, 1899); Cryptolestes denticornis (Casey, 1884); Cryptolestes iteratus (Sharp, 1899); Cryptolestes quadratus (Casey, 1884); Cryptolestes recticollis (Reitter, 1876); Laemophloeus addendus Sharp, 1899; Laemophloeus denticornis Casey, 1884; Laemophloeus iteratus Sharp, 1899; Laemophloeus quadratus Casey, 1884; Laemophloeus recticollis Reitter, 1876; Microbrontes uncicornis Reitter, 1874

= Cryptolestes uncicornis =

Species of beetle

Cryptolestes uncicornis is a species of lined flat bark beetle in the family Laemophloeidae. It is found in the Caribbean Sea, Central America, North America, and South America.
