= Passandrella =

Scientific classification
- Kingdom: Animalia
- Phylum: Arthropoda
- Class: Insecta
- Order: Coleoptera
- Suborder: Polyphaga
- Infraorder: Cucujiformia
- Family: Passandridae
- Genus: Passandrella

Genus of beetles

Passandrella is a genus of beetles in the family Passandridae.

== Species ==
- Passandrella tuberculata Burckhardt & Slipinski
- Passandrella visenda Grouvelle, 1916
