= Pest Infestation Control Laboratory =

- Location within Berkshire
- Former names: Pest Infestation Laboratory
- Alternative names: Slough Laboratory

General information
- Type: Entomology Research Centre
- Location: London Road, Upton, Slough, SL3 7HJ
- Coordinates: 51.503°N 0.5702°W
- Elevation: 25 m (82 ft)
- Current tenants: Housing estate
- Completed: 1929
- Owner: Department of Scientific and Industrial Research

The Pest Infestation Control Laboratory was a government-run laboratory in Slough during the Second World War and for some years after it, conducting research into food security.

== History ==
The field station was first established in 1929 by the Imperial College of Science and Technology on the Hurworth Estate; it was the college's first such field station and was located one mile east of Slough. However, pest research had already gained the interest of the Empire Marketing Board, and in the late 1930s the Grain Infestation Survey Committee was set up. In 1938, Sir William Beveridge was asked by the British government to make preparations for securing food supplies in the case of war, and he asked for the help of Professor James Munro at Imperial College. Munro believed a significant problem was insect infestations in grain stores, which went unreported, and he recommended "an intrusive examination of food stores". An entomologist in Munro's Stored Products Research Laboratories, Geoffrey Herford, was given the task of conducting a grain survey. On 1 April 1940, the Imperial College field station at Slough became the Pest Infestation Laboratory of the Department of Scientific and Industrial Research, and Herford was appointed as its director. He remained in charge until March 1968.

After the Second World War, some staff at the unit moved to Silwood Park, which is the rural campus of Imperial College, where work was carried out on chemical insecticides.

In February 1984, the government set up the Crops Protection Committee, which later found that up to 10% of stored grain was at risk from pest infestation. Fumigation was the most popular way to eradicate pests.

== Function ==
It carried out research on attacks by fungal and insect pests on harvested crops, to help farmers implement pest control strategies. The laboratory studied the life history, habits and physiology of pests (mainly insects). Insecticides that would limit insect population, or eradicate them, were studied, such as by fumigation. It worked largely with biologists and chemists at Imperial College, including the zoologists Octavius Lubatti and Albert Page.

In the 1980s it carried out research on the indestructible Pharaoh ant, by looking at analogue hormones.

== Structure ==
The main site was at the Slough Biological Field Station, partly run by the Ministry of Food. The Infestation Control Division was built at Tolworth.

== See also ==
- Forest Products Research Laboratory, set up in 1923 by the Department of Scientific and Industrial Research to investigate wood pests.
