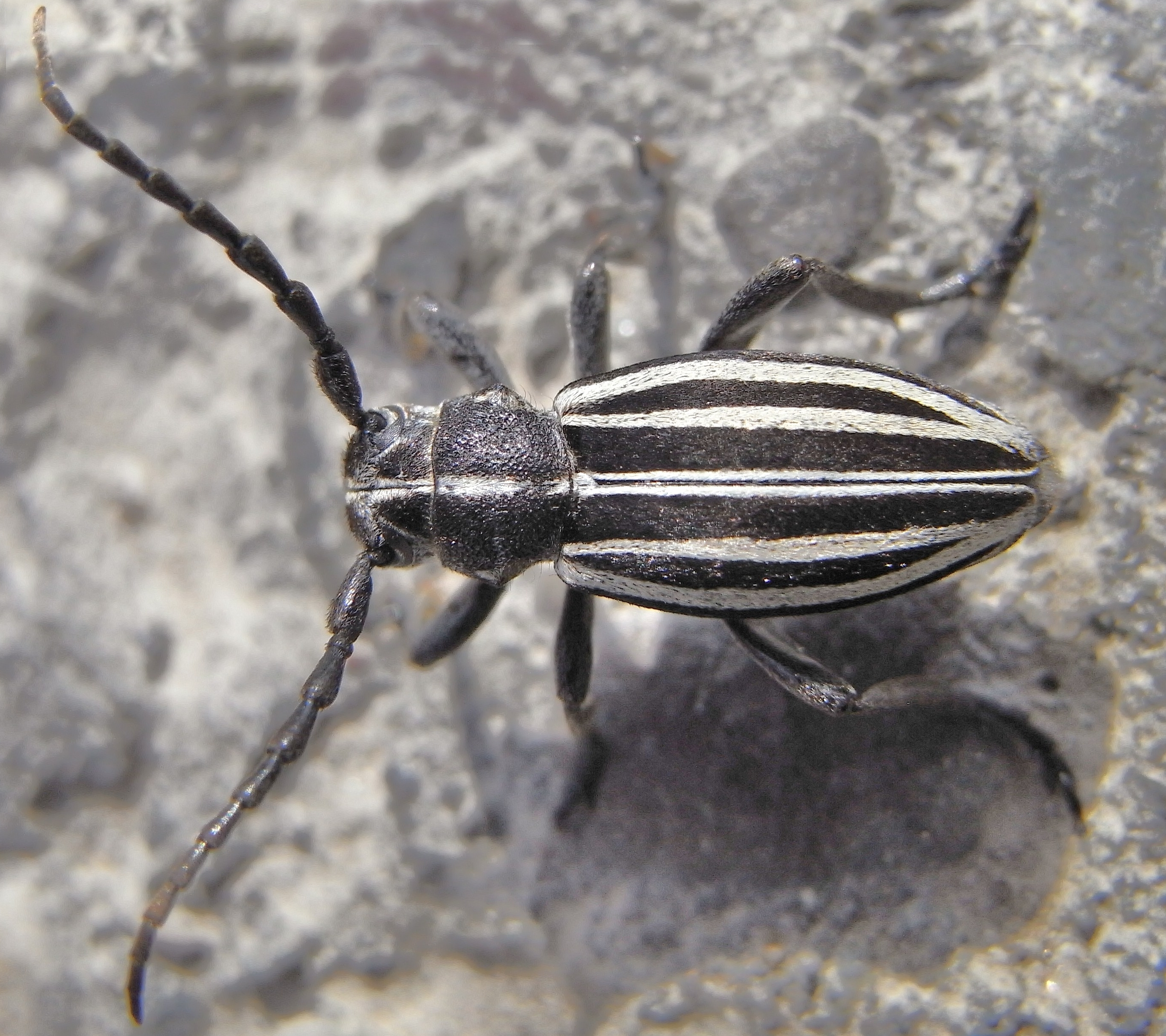
- Dorcadion scopolii

Scientific classification
- Kingdom: Animalia
- Phylum: Arthropoda
- Clade: Pancrustacea
- Class: Insecta
- Order: Coleoptera
- Suborder: Polyphaga
- Infraorder: Cucujiformia
- Family: Cerambycidae
- Genus: Dorcadion
- Species: D. scopolii

Binomial name
- Dorcadion scopolii (Herbst, 1784)

= Dorcadion scopolii =

Species of beetle

Dorcadion scopolii is a species of longhorn beetle in the subfamily Lamiinae.

== Description ==
The length of the adult is 9–11 millimetres (0.35–0.43 in). The antennae and legs are usually black. The pronotum is strongly transverse. The shoulder is external, spinal and seems to have almost an equal width of stripes.

Males have longer antennae compared to females. Adults feed on blades of grass, chewing them from the bottom.

Eggs are laid in tufts of grass. The larvae will feed on the fibrous roots and pupate. They will emerge in the following spring, sometime between late February and May, depending on the temperature.
