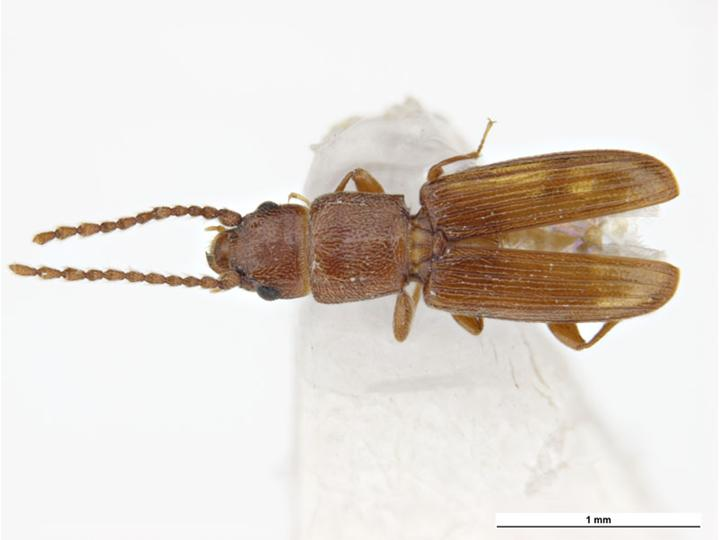

Scientific classification
- Domain: Eukaryota
- Kingdom: Animalia
- Phylum: Arthropoda
- Class: Insecta
- Order: Coleoptera
- Suborder: Polyphaga
- Infraorder: Cucujiformia
- Family: Laemophloeidae
- Genus: Cryptolestes
- Species: C. turcicus

Binomial name
- Cryptolestes turcicus (Grouvelle, 1876)

Synonyms
- Cryptolestes truncatus (Casey, 1884); Laemophloeus truncatus Casey, 1884; Laemophloeus turcicus Grouvelle, 1876

= Cryptolestes turcicus =

Species of beetle

Cryptolestes turcicus, the flour mill beetle, is a species of lined flat bark beetle in the family Laemophloeidae. It is found in North America and Europe.
