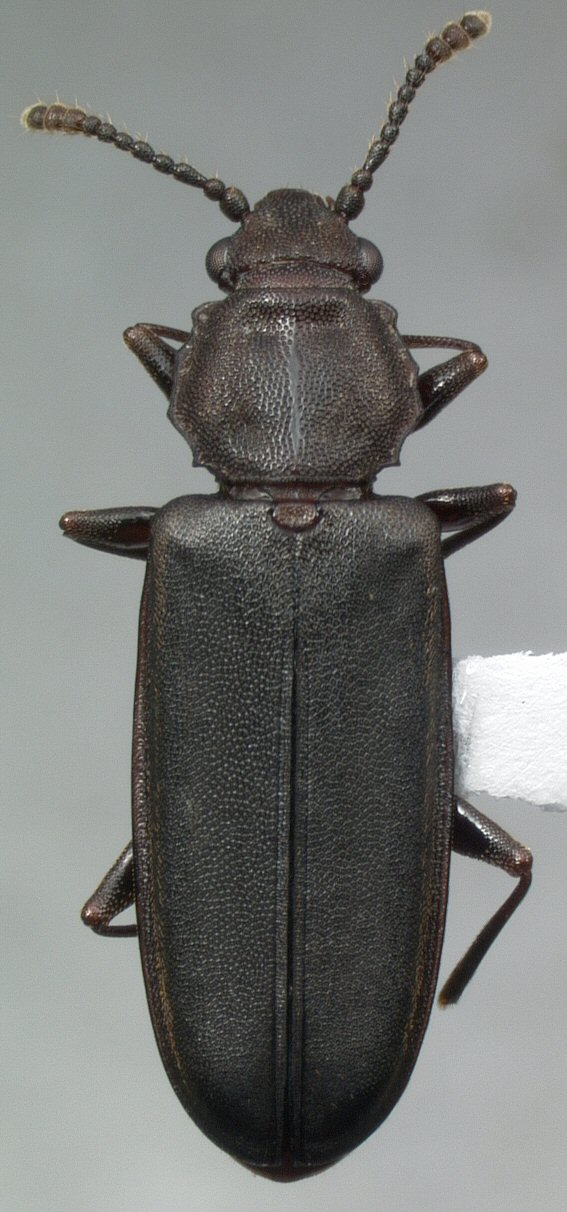
- Pediacus major

Scientific classification
- Kingdom: Animalia
- Phylum: Arthropoda
- Class: Insecta
- Order: Coleoptera
- Suborder: Polyphaga
- Infraorder: Cucujiformia
- Family: Cucujidae
- Genus: Pediacus; Shuckard, 1839

= Pediacus =

Genus of beetles

Pediacus is the largest genus in the family Cucujidae of flat bark beetles. It contains 31 currently recognized species. Pediacus adults are relatively small (2.7-7.0 mm), flattened brownish beetles with no or very small temples, and short antennae with a distinct club. Male genitalia are inverted and possess a short flagellum.

== Taxonomy ==
The genus is Holarctic in distribution, but extends south as far as Guatemala in the Western Hemisphere, generally at high altitudes, and into Australia in the Eastern Hemisphere. Adults and larvae are found under dead bark; frequently that of conifers in North America. They are thought to be predaceous. Most of the world fauna of Pediacus has been revised recently and the genus is relatively well-known taxonomically. Included species are:

- Pediacus dermestoides Fabricius
- Pediacus andrewsi Thomas
- Pediacus ater Grouvelle
- Pediacus australis Marris & Slipinski
- Pediacus bhutanicus Sen Gupta
- Pediacus carinatus Marris & Slipinski
- Pediacus confertus Sharp
- Pediacus depressus Herbst in Jablonsky
- Pediacus dermestoides (Fabricius, 1792)
- Pediacus elongatus Sen Gupta
- Pediacus fujianensis Marris & Slipinski
- Pediacus fuscus Erichson
- Pediacus gracilis Thomas
- Pediacus hesperoglaber Thomas
- Pediacus japonicus Reitter
- Pediacus kurosawai Sasaji
- Pediacus leei Marris & Ślipiński
- Pediacus major Sharp
- Pediacus mexicanus Sharp
- Pediacus montivagus Champion
- Pediacus ommatodon Thomas
- Pediacus pendleburyi Marris & Ślipiński
- Pediacus rufipes Grouvelle
- Pediacus similis Sharp
- Pediacus sinensis Marris & Ślipiński
- Pediacus smirnovi Nikitsky & Belov
- Pediacus stephani Thomas
- Pediacus subglaber LeConte
- Pediacus tabellatus Wollaston
- Pediacus taiwanensis Marris & Ślipiński
- Pediacus thomasi Marris & Ślipiński

In addition to the extant species, a single fossil species, Pediacus periclitans Scudder, has been described from the Eocene deposits at Florissant, Colorado. Its assignment to Pediacus has been questioned.
