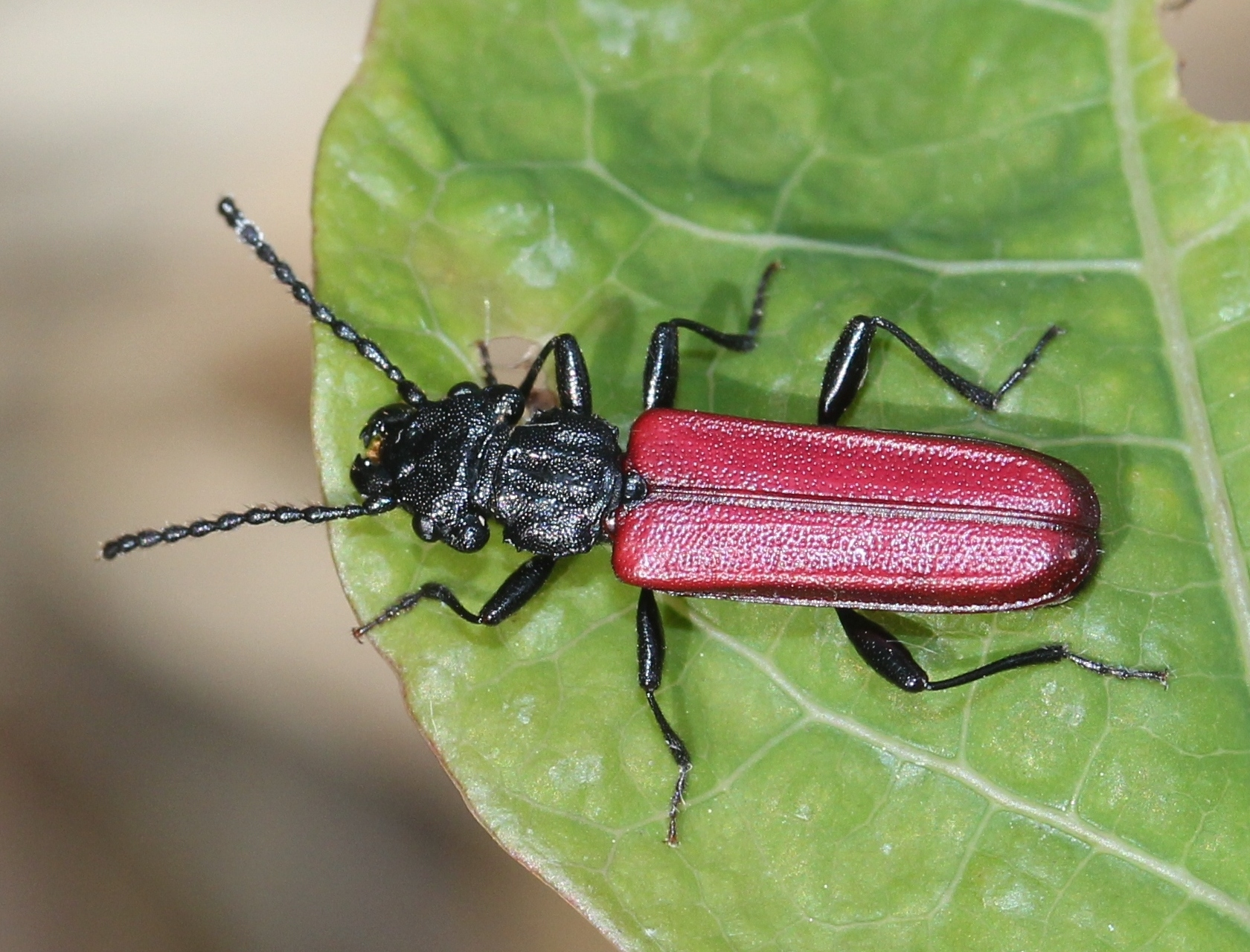
- Cucujus coccinatus

Scientific classification
- Kingdom: Animalia
- Phylum: Arthropoda
- Clade: Pancrustacea
- Class: Insecta
- Order: Coleoptera
- Suborder: Polyphaga
- Infraorder: Cucujiformia
- Family: Cucujidae
- Genus: Cucujus; Fabricius, 1775

= Cucujus =

Genus of beetles

Cucujus is a genus of beetles in the family Cucujidae, the flat bark beetles. It contains 25 currently recognized species and subspecies excluding the doubtful C. coloniarius.

== Description ==
Species of Cucujus are of moderate size (6-25mm), greatly dorso-ventrally compressed, and brightly colored, often red or red and black. Additionally, they can be distinguished from other members of the family by the head being generally wider than the pronotum with prominent temples, and the elongate, inverted male genitalia with a flagellum. The genus occurs throughout the Holarctic region, with indigenous species in North America, Europe, and Asia. It is most diverse in Asia.

== Ecology ==
The biology of most species in the genus is poorly known. All life stages live under dead bark, where they apparently are predacious. Larvae also are dorso-ventrally compressed. Cucujus clavipes puniceus, which occurs in western North America, has been the subject of considerable research interest due to its ability to produce natural antifreeze compounds.

== Species ==
- Cucujus bicolor Smith, 1851
- Cucujus chinensis Lee & Sâto, 2007
- Cucujus chuensis Hsiao, 2020
- Cucujus cinnaberinus Scopoli, 1763
- Cucujus clavipes Fabricius, 1781
- Cucujus coccinatus Lewis, 1881
- Cucujus coloniarius (Olliff, 1885) (syn. of C. bicolor?)
- Cucujus costatus Zhao & Zhang, 2019
- Cucujus elongatus Lee & Pütz, 2008
- Cucujus euphoria Hsiao, 2020
- Cucujus evangelium Hsiao, 2020
- Cucujus grouvellei Reitter, 1877
- Cucujus haematodes Erichson, 1845
  - Cucujus haematodes haematodes Erichson, 1845
  - Cucujus haematodes caucasicus Motschulsky, 1845
  - Cucujus haematodes opacus Lewis, 1888
- Cucujus janatai Háva, Zahradník & Růžička, 2019
- Cucujus kachin Hsiao, 2020
- Cucujus kempi Grouvelle, 1913
- Cucujus mniszechi Grouvelle, 1874
- Cucujus muelleri Bussler, 2017
- Cucujus nigripennis Lee & Sâto, 2007
- Cucujus puniceus Mannerheim, 1843
- Cucujus shennong Hsiao, 2020
- Cucujus tibetensis Hsiao, 2020
- Cucujus tulliae Bonacci, Mazzei, Horák & Brandmayr, 2012
- Cucujus zhengyucheni Jiang & Chen, 2025
