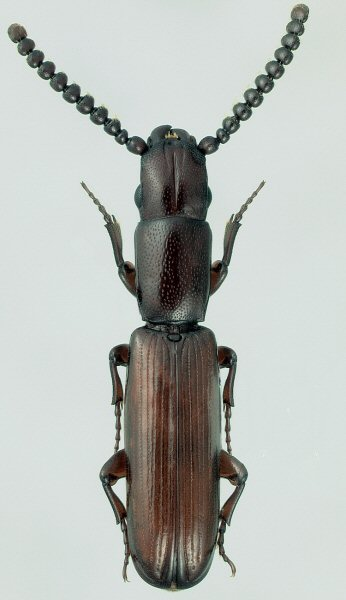
- Taphroscelidia linearis

Scientific classification
- Kingdom: Animalia
- Phylum: Arthropoda
- Class: Insecta
- Order: Coleoptera
- Suborder: Polyphaga
- Infraorder: Cucujiformia
- Superfamily: Cucujoidea
- Family: Passandridae; Erichson, 1845

Genera
- Ancistria Erichson, 1845; Aulonosoma Motschulsky, 1858; Catogenus Westwood, 1830; Nicolebertia Burck. & Slipinski, 1995; Passandra Dalm. in Schönh., 1817; Passandrella Grouvelle, 1916; Passandrina Reitter, 1878; Scalidiopsis Burck. & Slipinski, 1991; Taphroscelidia Crotch, 1873

= Passandridae =

Passandridae Temporal range: Cenomanian–Recent

Family of beetles

Passandridae, the "parasitic flat bark beetles," are a family of beetles notable for being one of the very few beetle families with larvae that are, as far as known, exclusively ectoparasitic on the immature stages of other beetles and Hymenoptera.

Adults are small to moderate sized beetles, 3-35mm, with heavily sclerotized bodies that are either dorso-ventrally compressed (genera occurring under bark) or subcylindrical in cross section (genera inhabiting wood-borer tunnels). Adults are generally brown or black, rarely with a color pattern, with prominent mandibles, confluent gular sutures, thick, moniliform antennae (antenna with equally sized spherical segments that looks like a string of beads), unequal tibial spurs on the front legs, and generally a characteristic system of grooves and/or carina on the dorsal surface.

Larvae are highly modified for their parasitoid habits. First instar larvae are heavily sclerotized, flattened, and spiny. Later instar larvae are physogastric (swollen posteriorly), with simple setae, short unsegmented legs, and reduced mouthparts. The larvae are especially associated with woodboring insects, as longhorn beetles and weevils. The adults are likely predaceous.

Passandridae consists of 109 described species in nine genera. Only Passandra Dalman occurs in both the Old and New Worlds, being represented in the Neotropical region by a single species, P. fasciata (Gray). The genera Ancistria, Aulonosoma, Nicolebertia, and Passandrina are restricted to the Old World, while Catogenus, Passandrella, Scalidiopsis, and Taphroscelidia are found only in the New World. Only Catogenus and Taphroscelidia occur in the Nearctic. The largest genus is Ancistria, with 34 described species.

They are members of the superfamily Cucujoidea. The oldest record of the family is Mesopassandra, from mid-Cretaceous (latest Albian-earliest Cenomanian) aged Burmese amber from Myanmar, around 100 million years old, which is placed in its own subfamily as the most primitive known member of the group.
