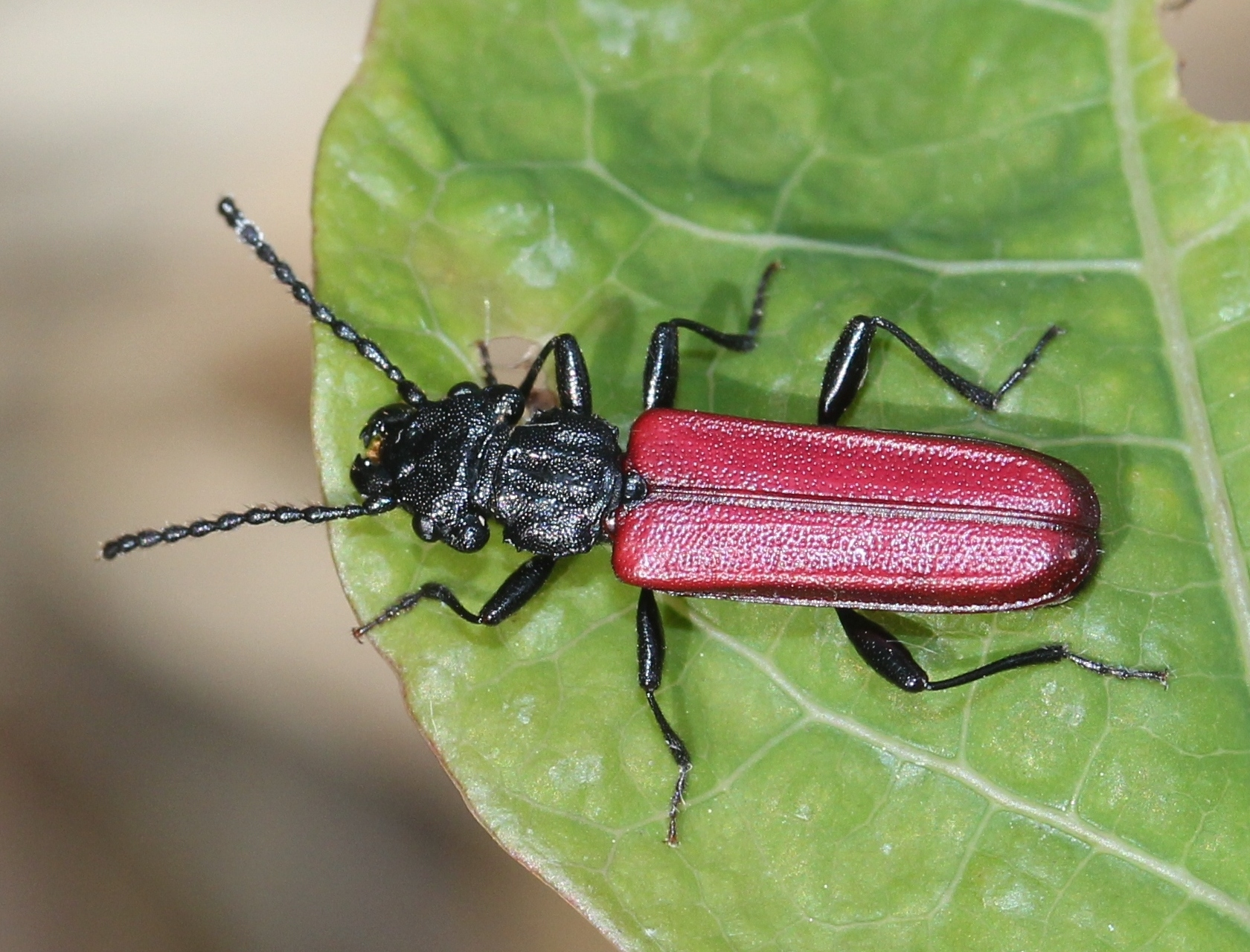
- Cucujus coccinatus

Scientific classification
- Kingdom: Animalia
- Phylum: Arthropoda
- Clade: Pancrustacea
- Class: Insecta
- Order: Coleoptera
- Suborder: Polyphaga
- Infraorder: Cucujiformia
- Superfamily: Cucujoidea
- Family: Cucujidae; Latreille, 1802

Genera
- Cucujus; Palaestes; Pediacus; Platisus; Thesaurus

= Cucujidae =

Cucujidae Temporal range: Eocene–Present

Family of beetles

The Cucujidae, or flat bark beetles, are a family of distinctively flat beetles found worldwide (except Africa and Antarctica) under the bark of dead trees. The family has received considerable taxonomic attention in recent years and now consists of 70 species distributed in five genera. It was indicated Cucujus species are scavengers, only feeding on pupae and larvae of other insects and on other subcortical beetles such as their own. Since the Cucujidae prey on larvae of potentially tree damaging beetles that spread fungal diseases, they are considered to be beneficial to the health of living trees.

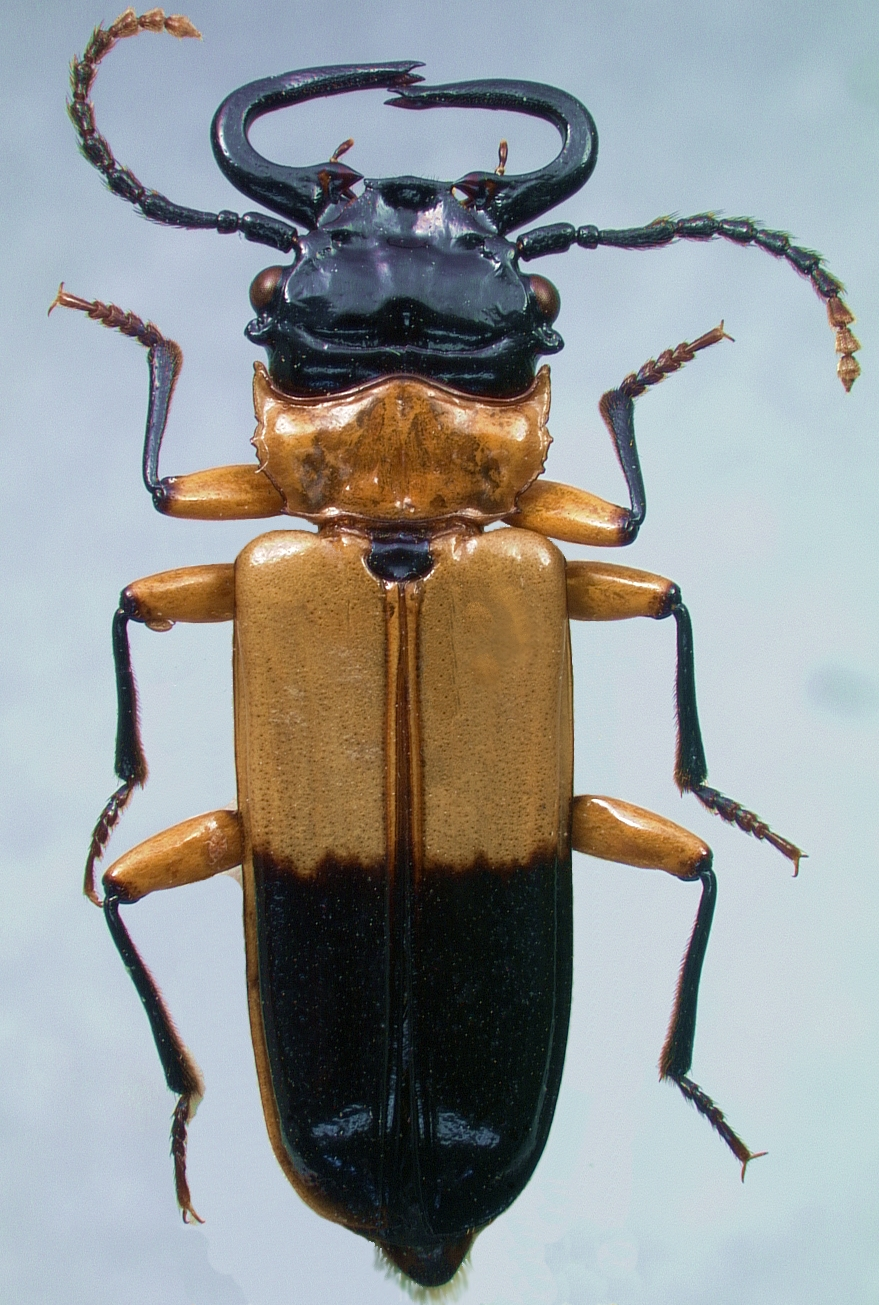
Dorsal habitus of Palaestes abruptus

Included genera are: Cucujus Fabricius, with 14 species and subspecies distributed throughout the Holarctic; Palaestes Perty, 8 spp., Neotropical; Pediacus Shuckard, 31 spp., mostly Holarctic, but extending south into the Neotropics and to Australia; Platisus Erichson, 5 spp. in Australia and New Zealand, and Thesaurus known from South America.

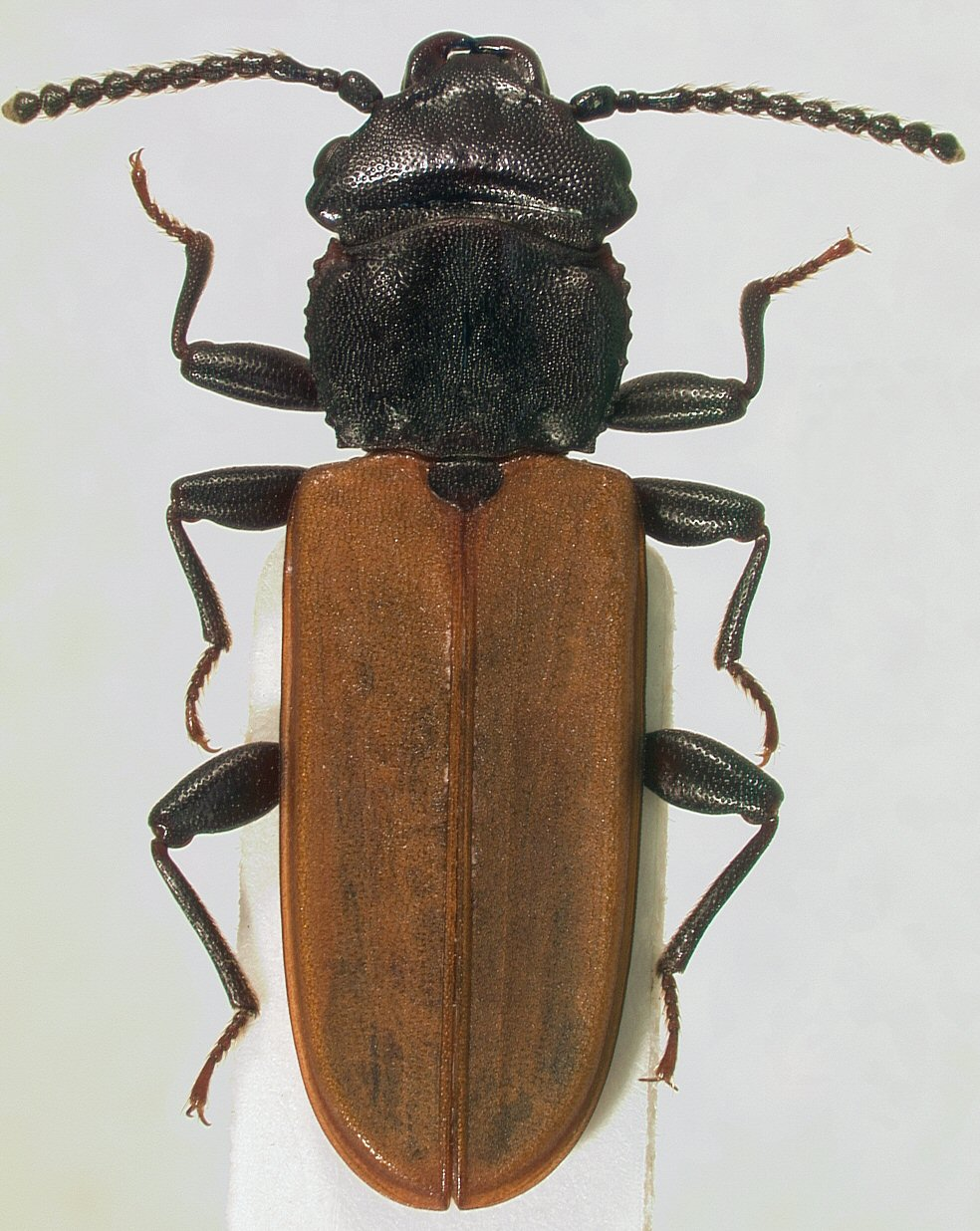
Dorsal habitus of Platisus coloniarius.

Cucujidae have elongate parallel-side bodies ranging from 6 to 25 mm in length. Most are brown colored, while others are black, reddish or yellow. Heads are triangular in shape, with filiform to moniliform antennae of 11 antennomeres, and large mandibles. The pronotum is narrower than the head.

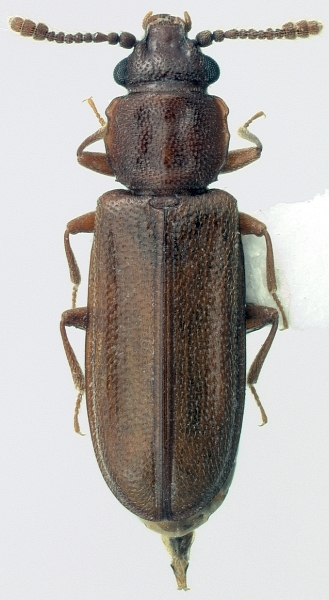
Dorsal habitus of Pediacus subglaber

Both larvae and adults live under bark, otherwise little is known of their habits. Larvae and adults appear to be predacious. Cucujus cinnaberinus seems to be able to colonize isolated habitats from persisting local populations if there is a sufficient quantity of suitable deadwood in the habitat and it has the other requirements of saproxylic beetles.

The family was formerly larger, with subfamilies Laemophloeinae, Silvaninae, and Passandrinae (and some tenebrionoid genera mixed in), but revisions have raised the subfamilies to family status.

While there have been claimed fossil records going back to the Early Cretaceous (such as those from the Crato Formation of Brazil), the oldest unambiguous records are from the Eocene.

== Species with extreme freezing tolerance ==
Cucujus clavipes puniceus (red flat bark beetle) found in arctic regions like Canada and Alaska desiccates to 30–40% body water in winter vs 4% body water in the chironomid fly, Polypedilum vanderplanki. It uses a variety of anti-freeze proteins in contrast with the non-protein xylomannan exploited by another arctic beetle Upis ceramboides.
