= Piesocorynus tesselatus =

Scientific classification
- Domain: Eukaryota
- Kingdom: Animalia
- Phylum: Arthropoda
- Class: Insecta
- Order: Coleoptera
- Suborder: Polyphaga
- Infraorder: Cucujiformia
- Family: Anthribidae
- Genus: Piesocorynus
- Species: P. tesselatus

Binomial name
- Piesocorynus tesselatus Schaeffer, 1906

Species of beetle

Piesocorynus tesselatus is a species of fungus weevil in the beetle family Anthribidae. It is found in North America.
