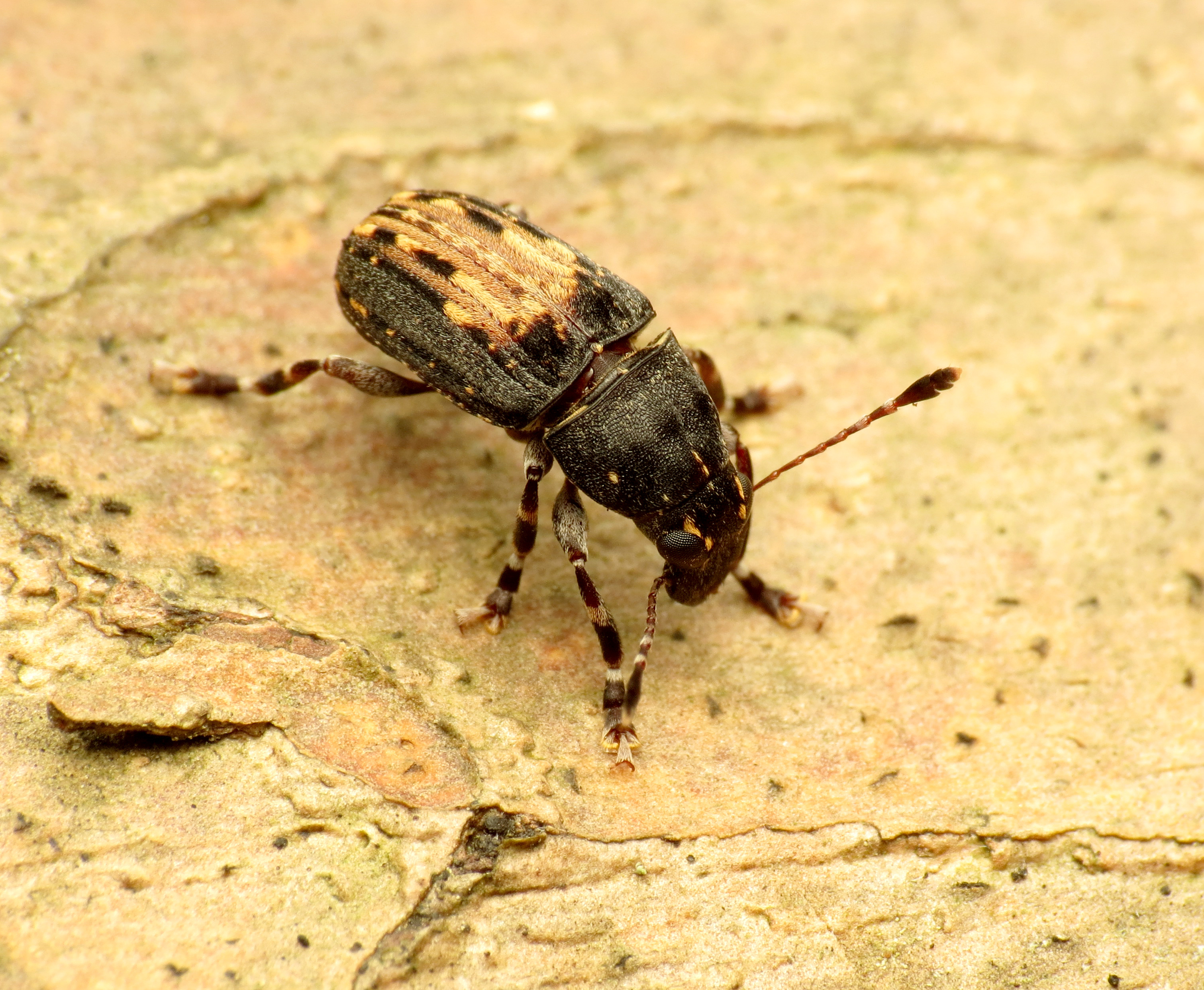

Scientific classification
- Domain: Eukaryota
- Kingdom: Animalia
- Phylum: Arthropoda
- Class: Insecta
- Order: Coleoptera
- Suborder: Polyphaga
- Infraorder: Cucujiformia
- Family: Anthribidae
- Genus: Piesocorynus
- Species: P. plagifer

Binomial name
- Piesocorynus plagifer Jordan, 1904

= Piesocorynus plagifer =

Species of beetle

Piesocorynus plagifer is a species of fungus weevils in the family Anthribidae. It is found in North America.
