= Piesocorynus moestus =

Scientific classification
- Kingdom: Animalia
- Phylum: Arthropoda
- Clade: Pancrustacea
- Class: Insecta
- Order: Coleoptera
- Suborder: Polyphaga
- Infraorder: Cucujiformia
- Superfamily: Curculionoidea
- Family: Anthribidae
- Genus: Piesocorynus
- Species: P. moestus

Binomial name
- Piesocorynus moestus (J. E. LeConte, 1824)

Species of beetle

Piesocorynus moestus is a species of fungus weevil in the beetle family Anthribidae. It is found in North America.
