= Piesocorynus mixtus =

Scientific classification
- Kingdom: Animalia
- Phylum: Arthropoda
- Clade: Pancrustacea
- Class: Insecta
- Order: Coleoptera
- Suborder: Polyphaga
- Infraorder: Cucujiformia
- Superfamily: Curculionoidea
- Family: Anthribidae
- Genus: Piesocorynus
- Species: P. mixtus

Binomial name
- Piesocorynus mixtus LeConte, 1876

Species of beetle

Piesocorynus mixtus is a species of fungus weevil in the beetle family Anthribidae. It is found in North America.
