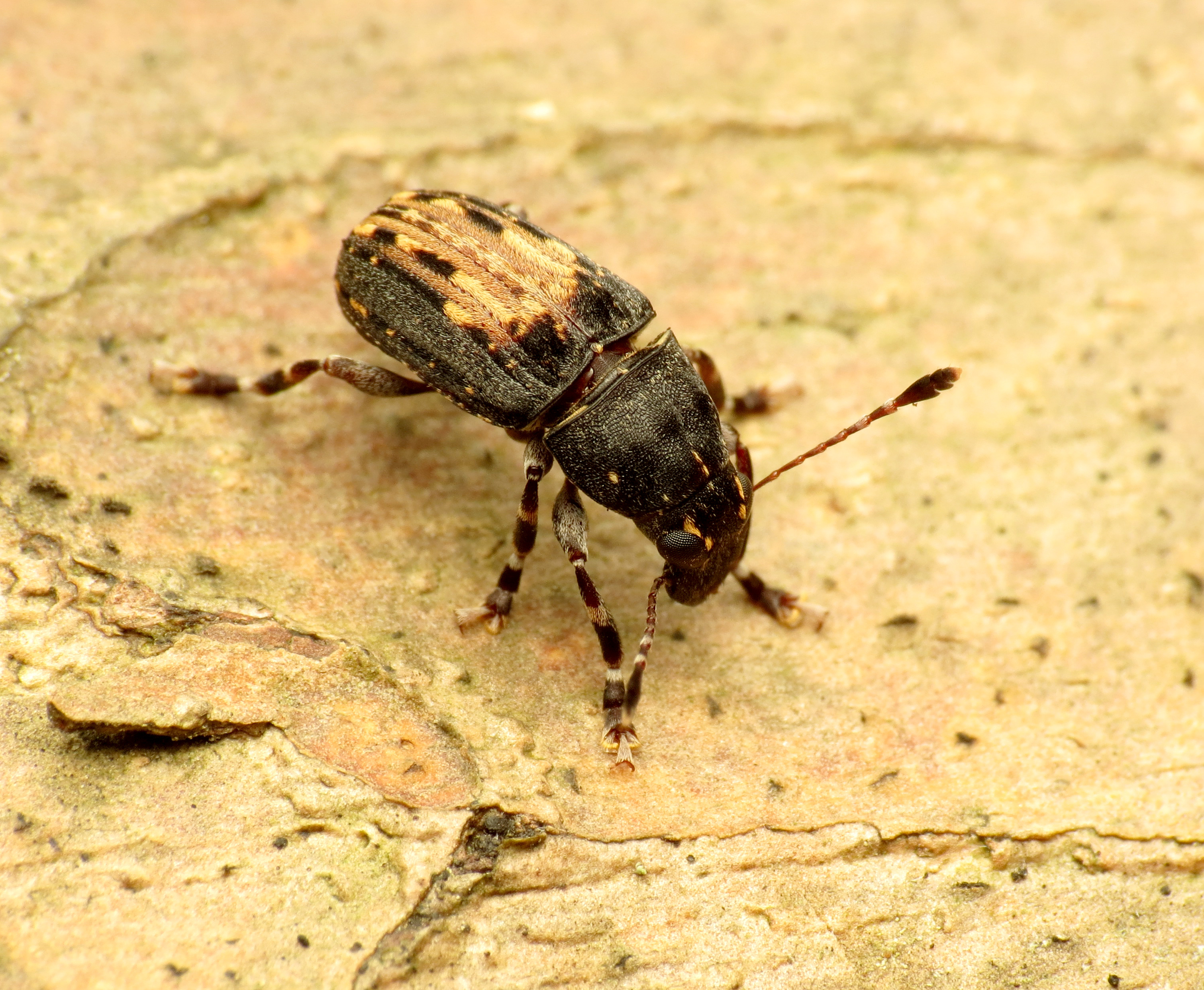
- Piesocorynus plagifer

Scientific classification
- Kingdom: Animalia
- Phylum: Arthropoda
- Class: Insecta
- Order: Coleoptera
- Suborder: Polyphaga
- Infraorder: Cucujiformia
- Family: Anthribidae
- Subfamily: Anthribinae
- Tribe: Piesocorynini
- Genus: Piesocorynus; Dejean, 1834

= Piesocorynus =

Genus of beetles

Piesocorynus is a genus of fungus weevils in the family Anthribidae. There are about 5 described species in Piesocorynus.

== Species ==
- Piesocorynus lateralis Jordan, 1906
- Piesocorynus mixtus LeConte, 1876
- Piesocorynus moestus (J. E. LeConte, 1824)
- Piesocorynus plagifer Jordan, 1904
- Piesocorynus tesselatus Schaeffer, 1906
