= Opsimini =

Scientific classification
- Kingdom: Animalia
- Phylum: Arthropoda
- Class: Insecta
- Order: Coleoptera
- Suborder: Polyphaga
- Infraorder: Cucujiformia
- Family: Cerambycidae
- Subfamily: Cerambycinae
- Tribe: Opsimini; LeConte, 1813

Tribe of beetles

Opsimini is a tribe of beetles in the subfamily Cerambycinae, containing the following genera and species:

- Genus Dicentrus
  - Dicentrus bidentatus (Champlain & Knull, 1926)
  - Dicentrus bluthneri LeConte, 1880
  - Dicentrus mehli Vitali & Damgaard, 2016
- Genus Europsimus
  - Europsimus germanicus Vitali, 2011
- Genus Japonopsimus
  - Japonopsimus balticus Vitali, 2014
  - Japonopsimus exocentroides Holzschuh, 1984
  - Japonopsimus orientalis (Matsushita, 1933)
  - Japonopsimus simplex (Gressitt & Rondon, 1970)
- Genus Opsimus
  - Opsimus quadrilineatus Mannerheim, 1843
