= Dicentrus bluthneri =

Scientific classification
- Kingdom: Animalia
- Phylum: Arthropoda
- Class: Insecta
- Order: Coleoptera
- Suborder: Polyphaga
- Infraorder: Cucujiformia
- Family: Cerambycidae
- Genus: Dicentrus
- Species: D. bluthneri

Binomial name
- Dicentrus bluthneri LeConte, 1880

Species of beetle

Dicentrus bluthneri is a species of beetle in the family Cerambycidae. It was described by John Lawrence LeConte in 1880.
