= Dicentrus bidentatus =

Scientific classification
- Kingdom: Animalia
- Phylum: Arthropoda
- Class: Insecta
- Order: Coleoptera
- Suborder: Polyphaga
- Infraorder: Cucujiformia
- Family: Cerambycidae
- Genus: Dicentrus
- Species: D. bidentatus

Binomial name
- Dicentrus bidentatus (Champlain & Knull, 1926)

Species of beetle

Dicentrus bidentatus is a species of beetle in the family Cerambycidae. It was described by Champlain and Knull in 1926.
