= Opsimus =

Scientific classification
- Kingdom: Animalia
- Phylum: Arthropoda
- Clade: Pancrustacea
- Class: Insecta
- Order: Coleoptera
- Suborder: Polyphaga
- Infraorder: Cucujiformia
- Family: Cerambycidae
- Genus: Opsimus
- Species: O. quadrilineatus

Binomial name
- Opsimus quadrilineatus Mannerheim, 1843

Genus of beetles

Opsimus is a genus of beetle in the family Cerambycidae, it contains a single species Opsimus quadrilineatus. It was described by Mannerheim in 1843.
