= List of subgroups of the order Coleoptera =

This article classifies the subgroups of the order Coleoptera (beetles) down to the level of families, following the system in "Family-group names in Coleoptera (Insecta)", Bouchard, et al. (2011), with corrections and additions from 2020, with common names from bugguide.net.

- Order Coleoptera
  - Suborder †Protocoleoptera
    - Superfamily †Tshekardocoleoidea Rohdendorf, 1944
      - Family †Tshekardocoleidae Rohdendorf, 1944
      - Family †Labradorocoleidae Ponomarenko, 1969
      - Family †Oborocoleidae Kukalová, 1969
    - Superfamily †Permocupedoidea Martynov, 1933
      - Family †Permocupedidae Martynov, 1933
      - Family †Taldycupedidae Rohdendorf, 1961
    - Superfamily †Permosynoidea Tillyard, 1924
      - Family †Ademosynidae Ponomarenko, 1968
      - Family †Permosynidae Tillyard, 1924
  - Suborder Archostemata
    - Superfamily Cupedoidea Laporte, 1836
      - Family Crowsoniellidae Iablokoff-Khnzorian, 1983
      - Family Cupedidae Laporte, 1836
      - Family Micromalthidae Barber, 1913
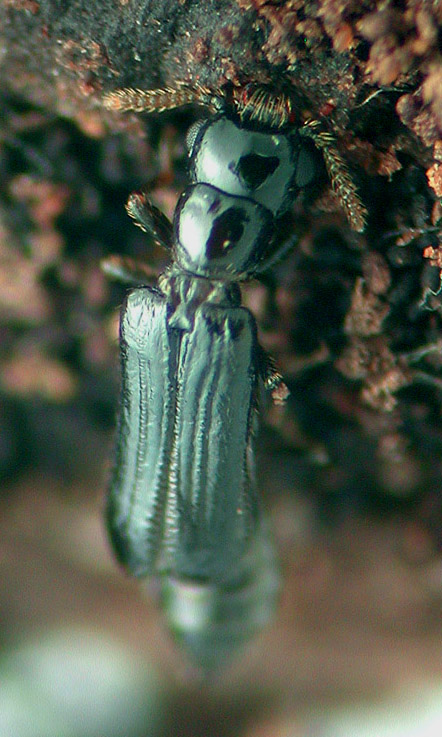
        Micromalthus debilis
      - Family Ommatidae Sharp and Muir, 1912
      - Family Jurodidae Ponomarenko, 1985
      - Family †Triadocupedidae Ponomarenko, 1966
      - Family †Magnocoleidae Hong, 1998
      - Family †Obrieniidae Zherikhin and Gratshev, 1994
    - Superfamily †Asiocoleoidea Rohdendorf, 1961
      - Family †Asiocoleidae Rohdendorf, 1961
      - Family †Tricoleidae Ponomarenko, 1969
    - Superfamily †Rhombocoleoidea Rohdendorf, 1961
      - Family †Rhombocoleidae Rohdendorf, 1961
    - Superfamily †Schizocoleoidea Rohdendorf, 1961 (formerly Schizophoroidea Ponomarenko, 1968)
      - Family †Phoroschizidae Bouchard and Bousquet, 2020 (formerly Schizophoridae Ponomarenko, 1968)
      - Family †Catiniidae Ponomarenko, 1968
      - Family †Schizocoleidae Rohdendorf, 1961
  - Suborder Myxophaga
    - Superfamily Lepiceroidea Hinton, 1936 (1882)
      - Family Lepiceridae Hinton, 1936 (1882)
    - Superfamily Sphaeriusoidea Erichson, 1845
      - Family Torridincolidae Steffan, 1964
      - Family Hydroscaphidae LeConte, 1874
      - Family Sphaeriusidae Erichson, 1845
  - Suborder Adephaga
      - Family †Tritarsusidae Hong, 2002 (formerly Tritarsidae Hong, 2002)
      - Family Gyrinidae Latreille, 1810 (whirligig beetles)
      - Family Trachypachidae Thomson, 1857 (false ground beetles)
      - Family Rhysodidae Laporte, 1840
      - Family Carabidae Latreille, 1802 (ground beetles)
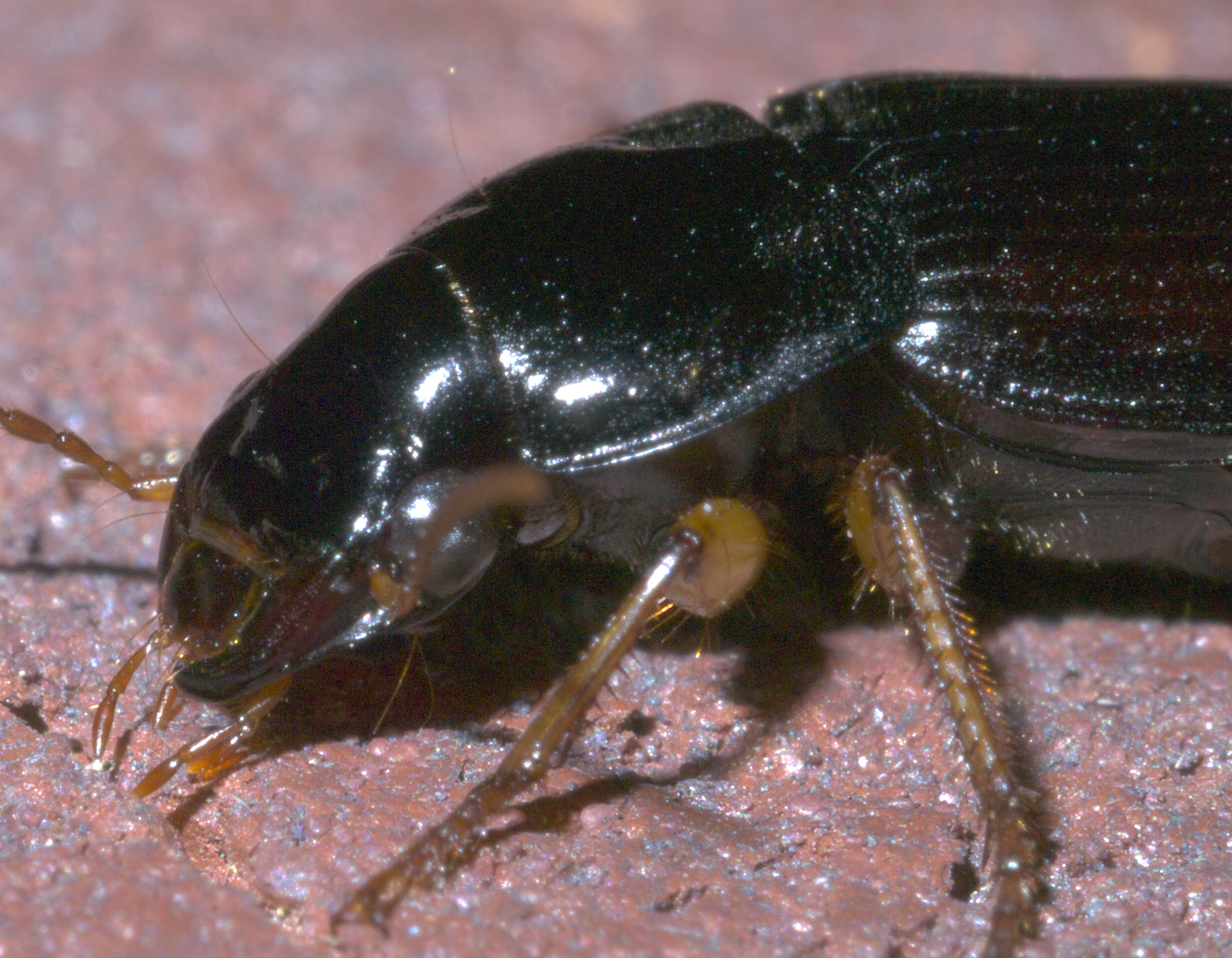
        Harpalus, in the Carabidae
      - Family Haliplidae Aubé, 1836 (crawling water beetles)
      - Family †Triaplidae Ponomarenko, 1977
      - Family †Colymbotethidae Ponomarenko, 1994
      - Family †Parahygrobiidae Ponomarenko, 1977
      - Family †Coptoclavidae Ponomarenko, 1961
      - Family †Liadytidae Ponomarenko, 1977
      - Family Meruidae Spangler and Steiner, 2005
      - Family Noteridae Thomson, 1860 (burrowing water beetles)
      - Family Amphizoidae LeConte, 1853
      - Family Aspidytidae Ribera, Beutel, Balke and Vogler, 2002
      - Family Hygrobiidae Régimbart, 1879 (1837)
      - Family Dytiscidae Leach, 1815 (predaceous diving beetles)
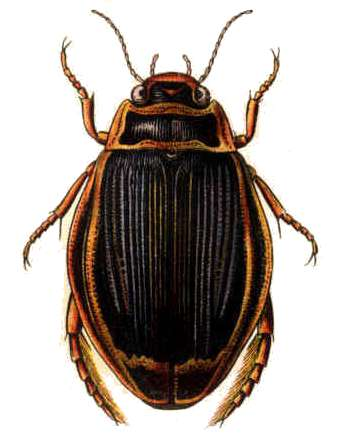
        Dytiscus latissimus, in the Dytiscidae
  - Suborder Polyphaga
    - Infraorder Staphyliniformia
      - Superfamily Histeroidea Gyllenhal, 1808
        - Family Histeridae Gyllenhal, 1808
        - Family Sphaeritidae Shuckard, 1839
        - Family Synteliidae Lewis, 1882
      - Superfamily Hydrophiloidea Latreille, 1802
        - Family Epimetopidae Zaitzev, 1908
        - Family Georissidae Laporte, 1840
        - Family Helophoridae Leach, 1815
        - Family Hydrochidae Thomson, 1859
        - Family Hydrophilidae Latreille, 1802 (water scavenger beetles)
        - Family Spercheidae Erichson, 1837
      - Superfamily Staphylinoidea Latreille, 1802
        - Family Hydraenidae Mulsant, 1844
        - Family Ptiliidae Erichson, 1845
        - Family Agyrtidae Thomson, 1859
        - Family Leiodidae Fleming, 1821
        - Family Silphidae Latreille, 1806
        - Family Staphylinidae Latreille, 1802 (rove beetles)
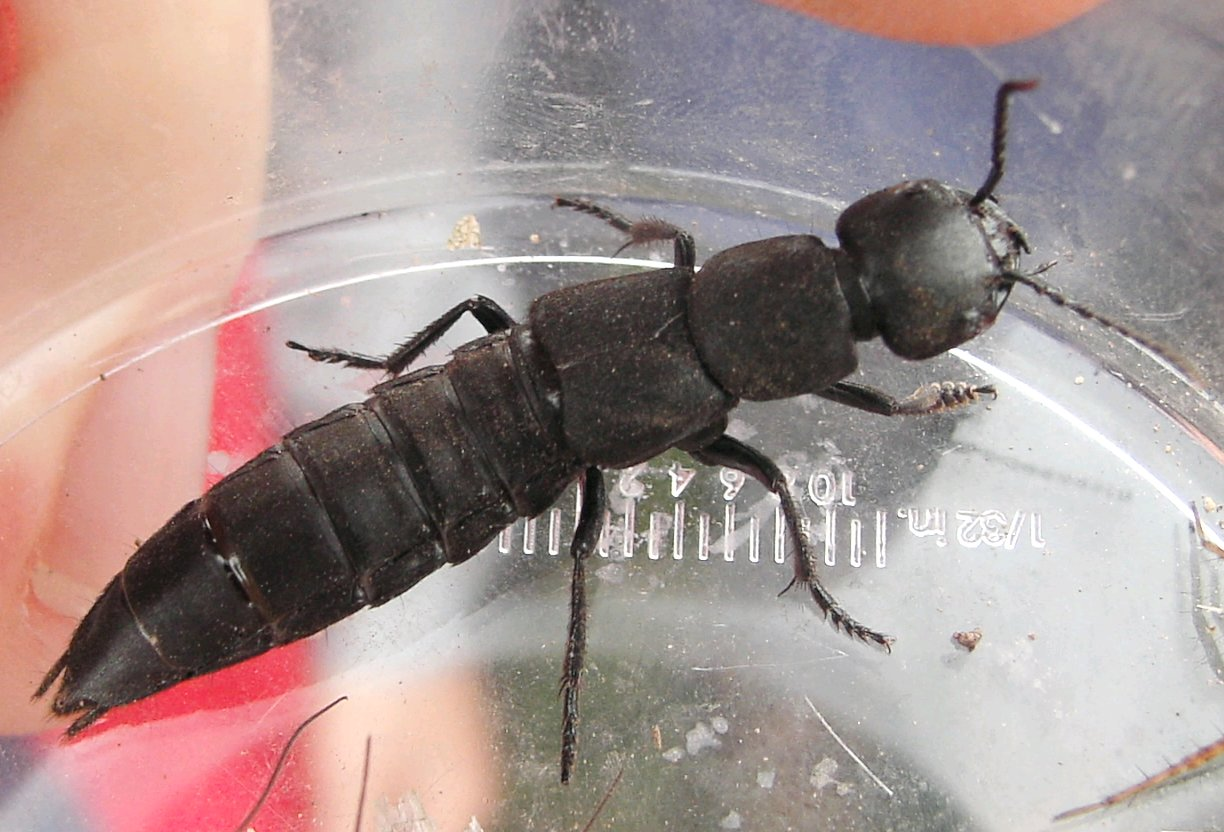
          Devil's coach horse beetle, Ocypus olens, a rove beetle
    - Infraorder Scarabaeiformia
      - Superfamily Scarabaeoidea Latreille, 1802
        - Family Pleocomidae LeConte, 1861 (rain beetles)
        - Family Bolboceratidae Mulsant, 1842
        - Family Geotrupidae Latreille, 1802 (earth-boring scarab beetles)
        - Family Belohinidae Paulian, 1959
        - Family Passalidae Leach, 1815 (bess beetles)
        - Family Trogidae MacLeay, 1819 (hide beetles)
        - Family Glaresidae Prudhomme de Borre, 1886
        - Family Diphyllostomatidae Holloway, 1972
        - Family Lucanidae Latreille, 1804 (stag beetles)
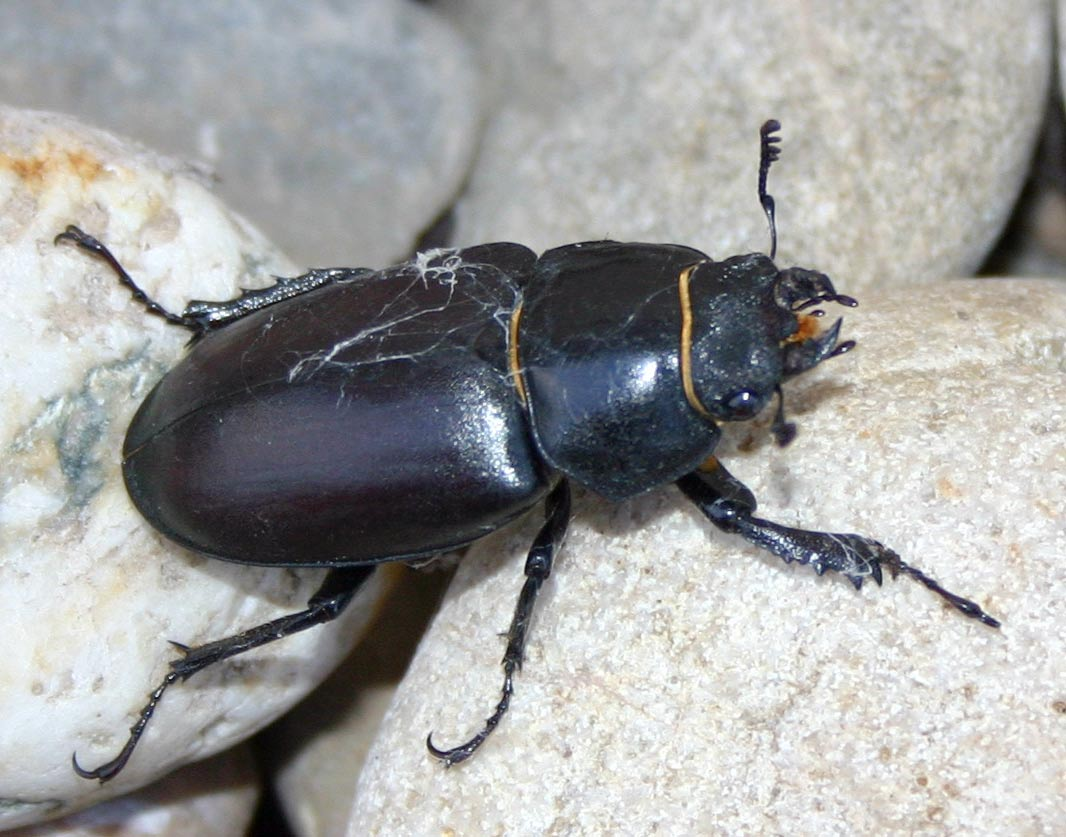
          Lucanus cervus, a stag beetle
        - Family Ochodaeidae Streubel, 1846 (sand-loving scarab beetles)
        - Family Hybosoridae Erichson, 1847
        - Family Glaphyridae MacLeay, 1819 (bumble bee scarab beetles)
        - Family Scarabaeidae Latreille, 1802 (scarab beetles)
        - Family †Coprinisphaeridae Genise, 2004 (ichnotaxon)
        - Family †Pallichnidae Genise, 2004 (ichnotaxon)
    - Infraorder Elateriformia
      - Superfamily Scirtoidea Fleming, 1821
        - Family Decliniidae Nikitsky, Lawrence, Kirejtshuk and Gratshev, 1994
        - Family Eucinetidae Lacordaire, 1857
        - Family Clambidae Fischer von Waldheim, 1821
        - Family Scirtidae Fleming, 1821
        - Family †Elodophthalmidae Kirejtshuk and Azar, 2008
        - Family †Mesocinetidae Kirejtshuk and Ponomarenko, 2010
      - Superfamily Dascilloidea Guérin-Méneville, 1843 (1834)
        - Family Dascillidae Guérin-Méneville, 1843 (1834)
        - Family Rhipiceridae Latreille, 1834
      - Superfamily Buprestoidea Leach, 1815
        - Family Schizopodidae LeConte, 1859
        - Family Buprestidae Leach, 1815
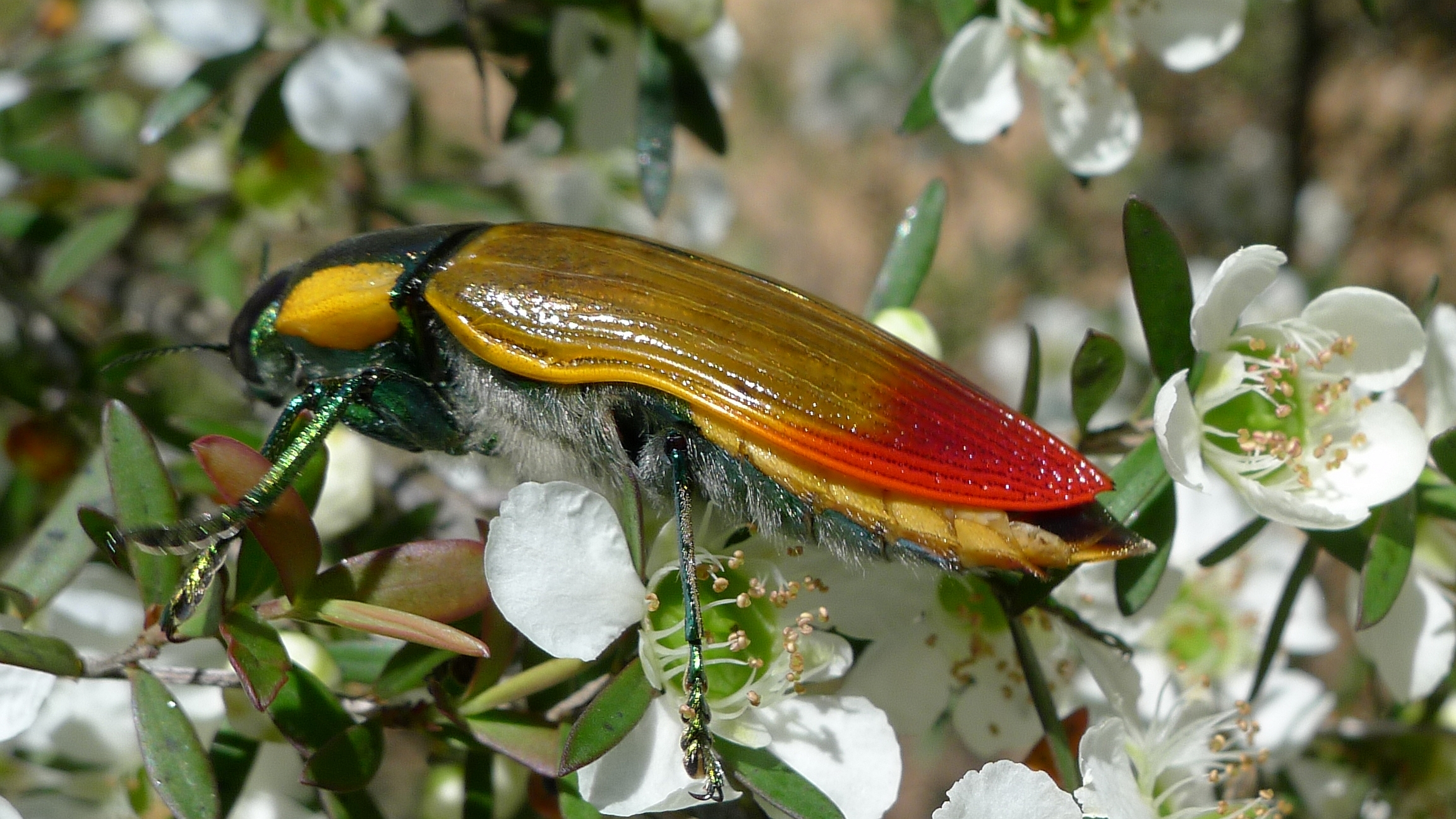
          Buprestidae
      - Superfamily Byrrhoidea Latreille, 1804
        - Family Byrrhidae Latreille, 1804
        - Family Protelmidae Jeannel, 1950
        - Family Elmidae Curtis, 1830
        - Family Dryopidae Billberg, 1820 (1817)
        - Family Lutrochidae Kasap and Crowson, 1975
        - Family Limnichidae Erichson, 1846
        - Family Heteroceridae MacLeay, 1825
        - Family Psephenidae Lacordaire, 1854
        - Family Cneoglossidae Champion, 1897
        - Family Ptilodactylidae Laporte, 1836
        - Family Podabrocephalidae Pic, 1930
        - Family Chelonariidae Blanchard, 1845
        - Family Eulichadidae Crowson, 1973
        - Family Callirhipidae Emden, 1924
      - Superfamily Elateroidea Leach, 1815
        - Family Artematopodidae Lacordaire, 1857
        - Family Brachypsectridae Horn, 1881
        - Family Cantharidae Imhoff, 1856 (1815) (soldier beetles)
        - Family Cerophytidae Latreille, 1834
        - Family Elateridae Leach, 1815 (click beetles; includes former Drilidae, Omalisidae, and Plastoceridae)
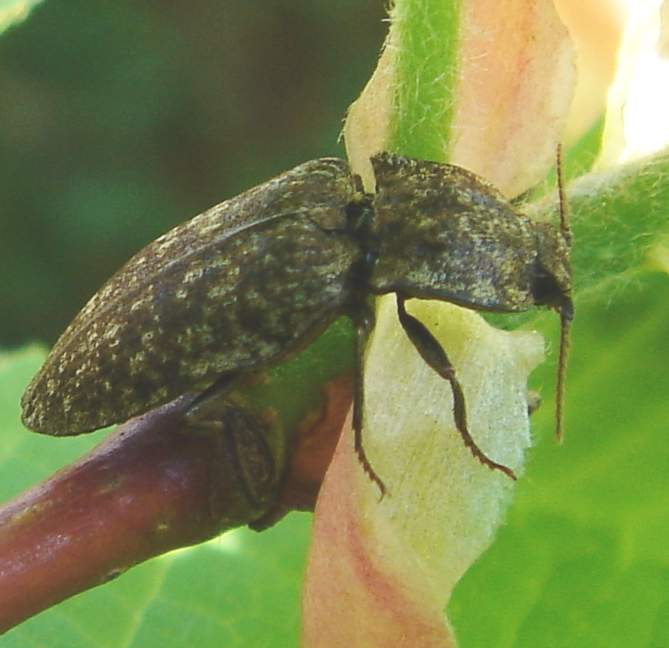
          Agrypnus murinus, a click beetle
        - Family Eucnemidae Eschscholtz, 1829
        - Family Lampyridae Rafinesque, 1815 (fireflies)
        - Family Lycidae Laporte, 1836
        - Family Omethidae LeConte, 1861 (includes former Telegeusidae)
        - Family Phengodidae LeConte, 1861
        - Family Rhagophthalmidae Olivier, 1907
        - Family Sinopyrophoridae Bi, 2018
        - Family Throscidae Laporte, 1840 nomen protectum
        - Family †Berendtimiridae Winkler, 1987
        - Family †Praelateriidae Dolin, 1973
      - Superfamily Rhinorhipoidea Lawrence, 1988
        - Family Rhinorhipidae Lawrence, 1988
    - Infraorder Bostrichiformia
      - Superfamily Derodontoidea LeConte, 1861
        - Family Derodontidae LeConte, 1861
        - Family Nosodendridae Erichson, 1846
        - Family Jacobsoniidae Heller, 1926
      - Superfamily Bostrichoidea Latreille, 1802
        - Family Dermestidae Latreille, 1804 (carpet beetles)
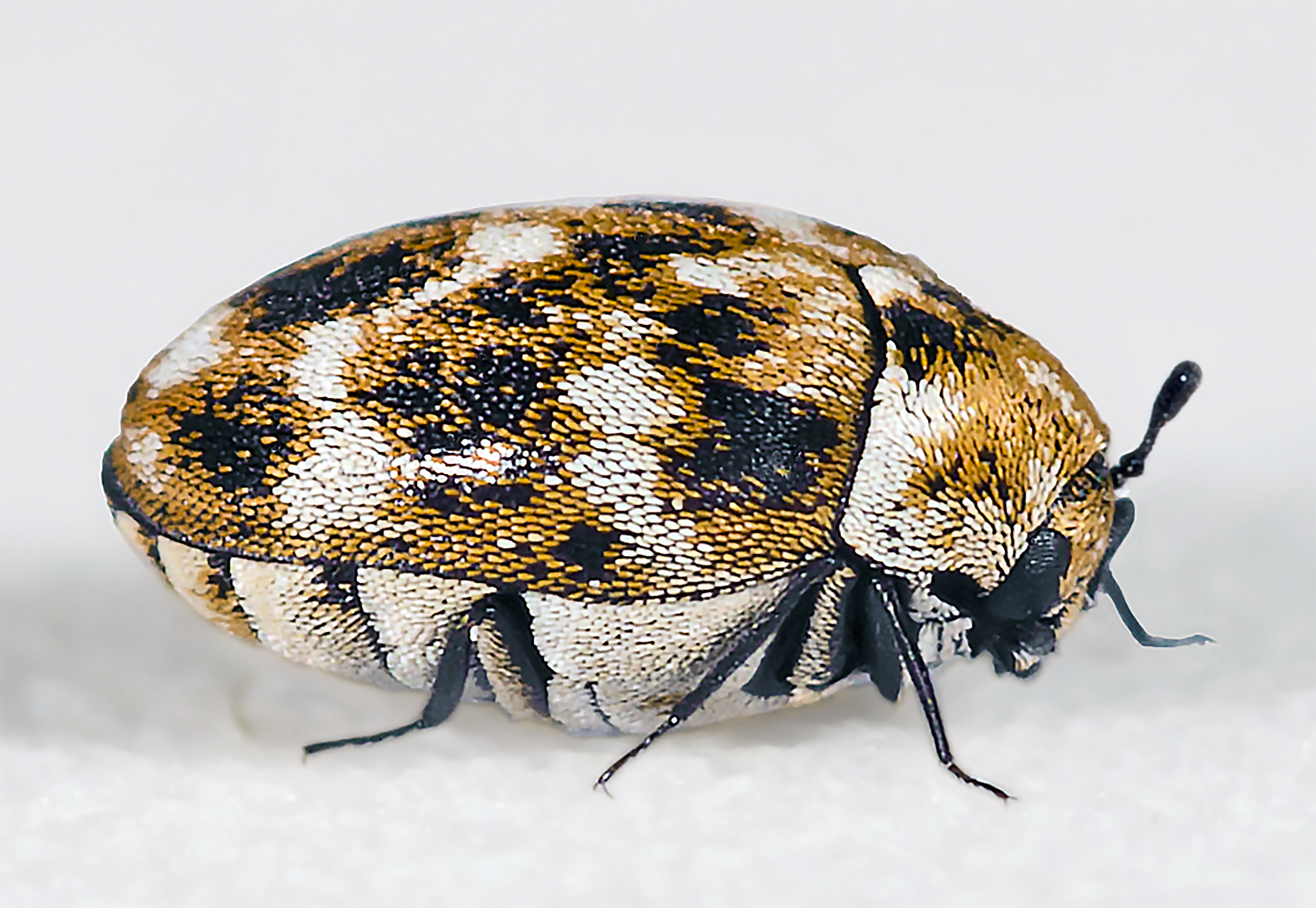
          Anthrenus verbasci, in the Dermestidae
        - Family Endecatomidae LeConte, 1861
        - Family Bostrichidae Latreille, 1802
        - Family Ptinidae Latreille, 1802
    - Infraorder Cucujiformia
      - Superfamily Lymexyloidea Fleming, 1821
        - Family Lymexylidae Fleming, 1821
      - Superfamily Cleroidea Latreille, 1802
        - Family Phloiophilidae Kiesenwetter, 1863
        - Family Trogossitidae Latreille, 1802
        - Family Chaetosomatidae Crowson, 1952
        - Family Metaxinidae Kolibáč, 2004
        - Family Thanerocleridae Chapin, 1924
        - Family Cleridae Latreille, 1802 (checkered beetles)
        - Family Acanthocnemidae Crowson, 1964
        - Family Phycosecidae Crowson, 1952
        - Family Prionoceridae Lacordaire, 1857
        - Family Mauroniscidae Majer, 1995
        - Family Melyridae Leach, 1815 (soft-winged flower beetles)
      - Superfamily Cucujoidea Latreille, 1802
        - Family †Parandrexidae Kirejtshuk, 1994
        - Family †Sinisilvanidae Hong, 2002
        - Family Boganiidae Sen Gupta and Crowson, 1966
        - Family Byturidae Gistel, 1848
        - Family Helotidae Chapuis, 1876
        - Family Protocucujidae Crowson, 1954
        - Family Sphindidae Jacquelin du Val, 1860
        - Family Biphyllidae LeConte, 1861
        - Family Erotylidae Latreille, 1802
        - Family Monotomidae Laporte, 1840
        - Family Hobartiidae Sen Gupta and Crowson, 1966
        - Family Cryptophagidae Kirby, 1826
        - Family Agapythidae Sen Gupta and Crowson, 1969
        - Family Priasilphidae Crowson, 1973
        - Family Phloeostichidae Reitter, 1911
        - Family Silvanidae Kirby, 1837
        - Family Cucujidae Latreille, 1802
        - Family Myraboliidae Lawrence and Britton, 1991
        - Family Cavognathidae Sen Gupta and Crowson, 1966
        - Family Lamingtoniidae Sen Gupta and Crowson, 1969
        - Family Passandridae Blanchard, 1845
        - Family Phalacridae Leach, 1815
        - Family Propalticidae Crowson, 1952
        - Family Laemophloeidae Ganglbauer, 1899
        - Family Tasmosalpingidae Lawrence and Britton, 1991
        - Family Cyclaxyridae Gimmel, Leschen and Ślipiński, 2009
        - Family Kateretidae Kirby, 1837
        - Family Nitidulidae Latreille, 1802
        - Family Smicripidae Horn, 1880
        - Family Bothrideridae Erichson, 1845
        - Family Cerylonidae Billberg, 1820
        - Family Alexiidae Imhoff, 1856
        - Family Discolomatidae Horn, 1878
        - Family Endomychidae Leach, 1815
        - Family Coccinellidae Latreille, 1807 (ladybirds or lady beetles)
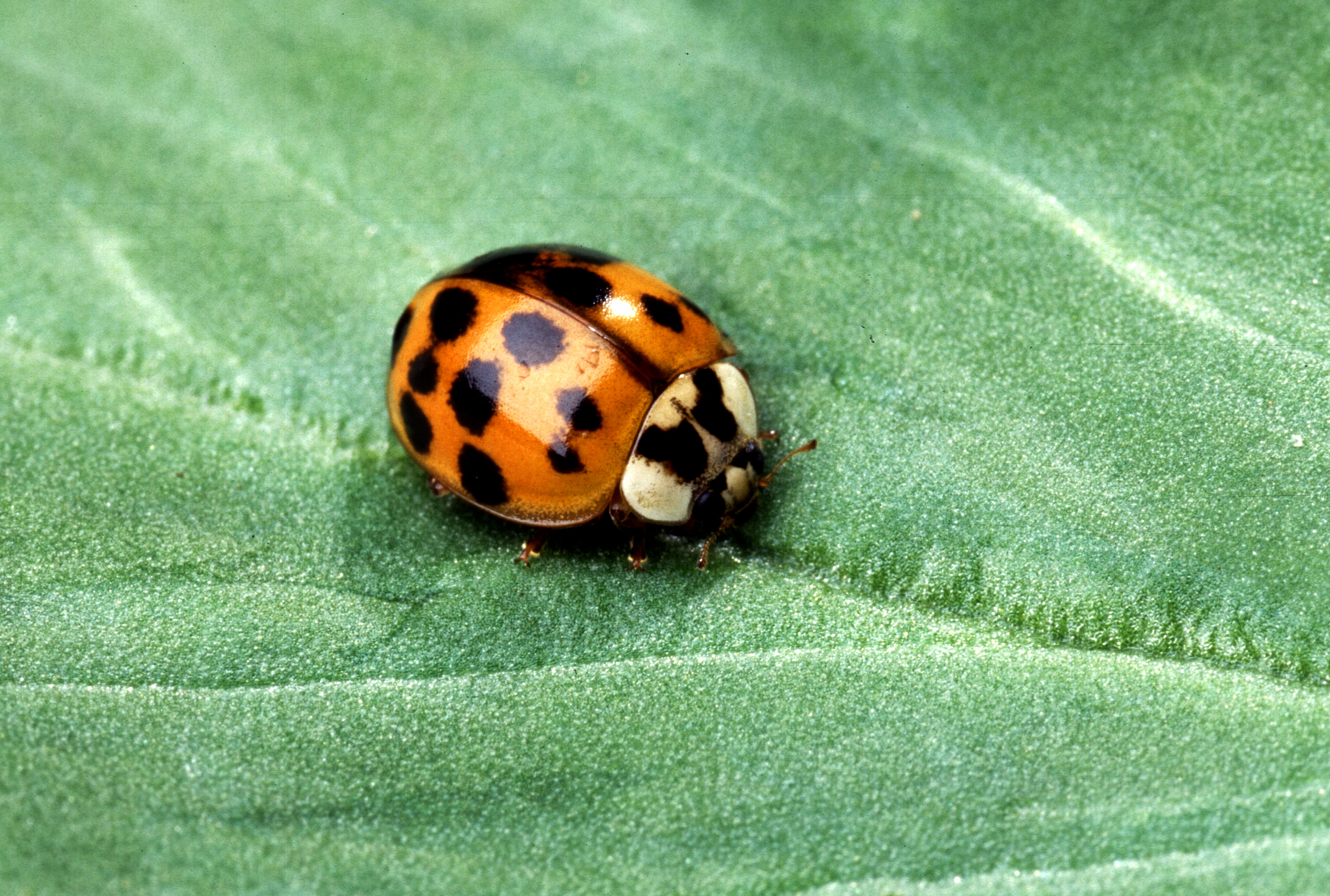
          Asian multicolored lady beetle, Harmonia axyridis
        - Family Corylophidae LeConte, 1852
        - Family Akalyptoischiidae Lord, Hartley, Lawrence, McHugh, Whiting and Miller, 2010
        - Family Latridiidae Erichson, 1842
      - Superfamily Tenebrionoidea Latreille, 1802
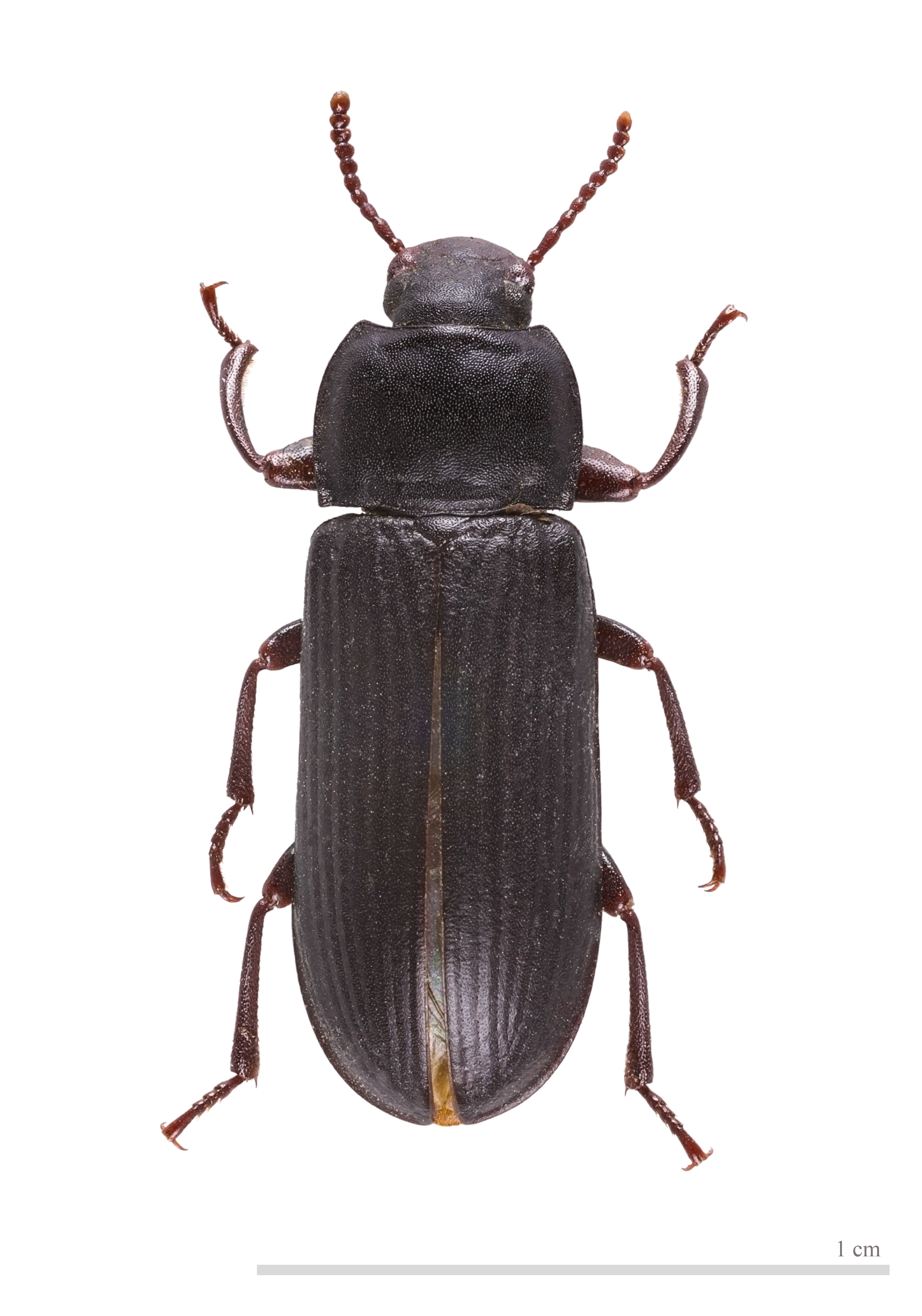
        Tenebrionoidea - Tenebrio molitor
        - Family Mycetophagidae Leach, 1815
        - Family Archeocrypticidae Kaszab, 1964
        - Family Pterogeniidae Crowson, 1953
        - Family Ciidae Leach, 1819
        - Family Tetratomidae Billberg, 1820
        - Family Melandryidae Leach, 1815
        - Family Mordellidae Latreille, 1802 (tumbling flower beetles)
        - Family Ripiphoridae Laporte, 1840
        - Family Zopheridae Solier, 1834
        - Family Ulodidae Pascoe, 1869
        - Family Promecheilidae Lacordaire, 1859
        - Family Chalcodryidae Watt, 1974
        - Family Trachelostenidae Lacordaire, 1859
        - Family Tenebrionidae Latreille, 1802 (darkling beetles)
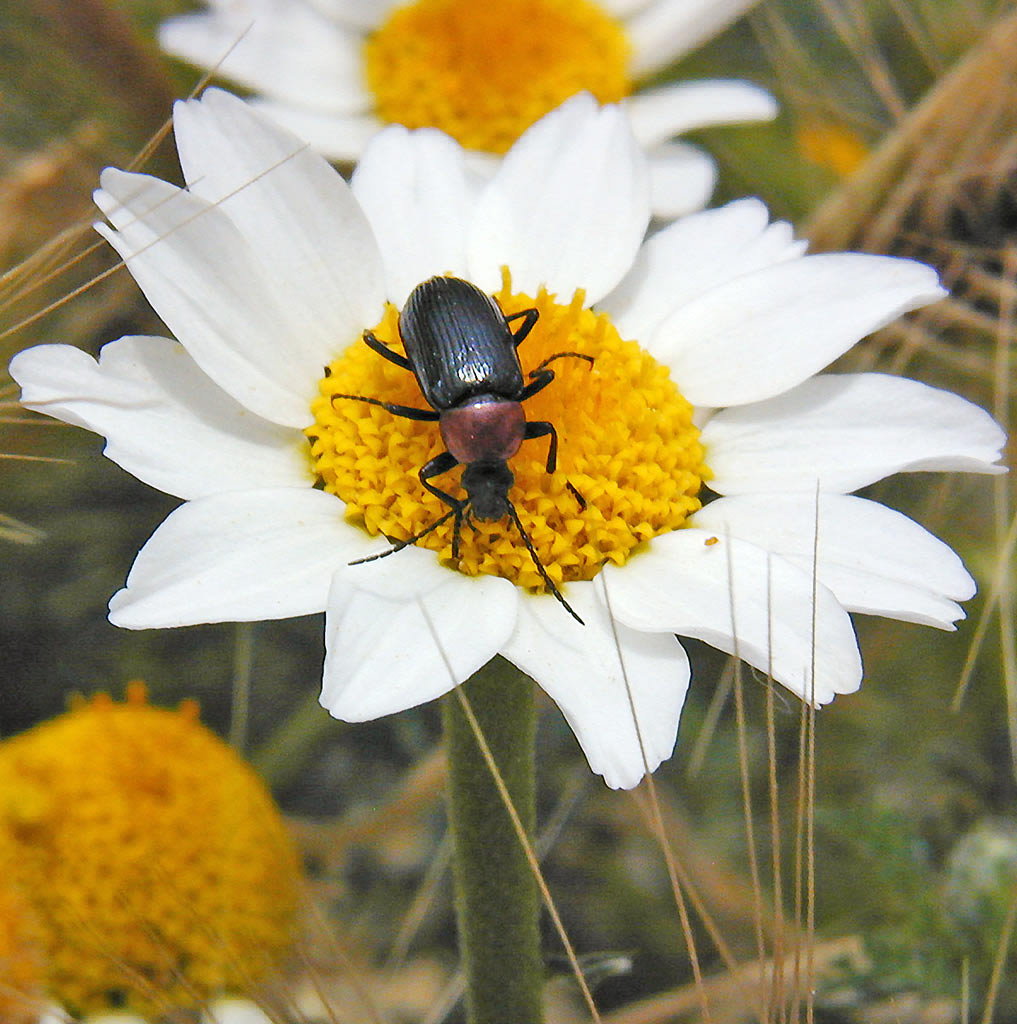
          Heliotaurus ruficollis, a darkling beetle
        - Family Prostomidae Thomson, 1859
        - Family Synchroidae Lacordaire, 1859
        - Family Stenotrachelidae Thomson, 1859
        - Family Oedemeridae Latreille, 1810
        - Family Meloidae Gyllenhal, 1810 (blister beetles)
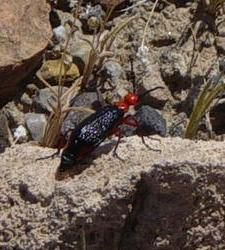
          Lytta magister, in the Meloidae
        - Family Mycteridae Perty, 1840 (palm beetles and flower beetles)
        - Family Boridae Thomson, 1859
        - Family Trictenotomidae Blanchard, 1845
        - Family Pythidae Solier, 1834
        - Family Pyrochroidae Latreille, 1806
        - Family Salpingidae Leach, 1815
        - Family Anthicidae Latreille, 1819
        - Family Aderidae Csiki, 1909
        - Family Scraptiidae Gistel, 1848
      - Clade Phytophaga
        - Superfamily Chrysomeloidea Latreille, 1802
          - Family Oxypeltidae Lacordaire, 1868
          - Family Vesperidae Mulsant, 1839
          - Family Disteniidae Thomson, 1861
          - Family Cerambycidae Latreille, 1802 (longhorn beetles)
          - Family Megalopodidae Latreille, 1802
          - Family Orsodacnidae Thomson, 1859
          - Family Chrysomelidae Latreille, 1802 (leaf beetles)
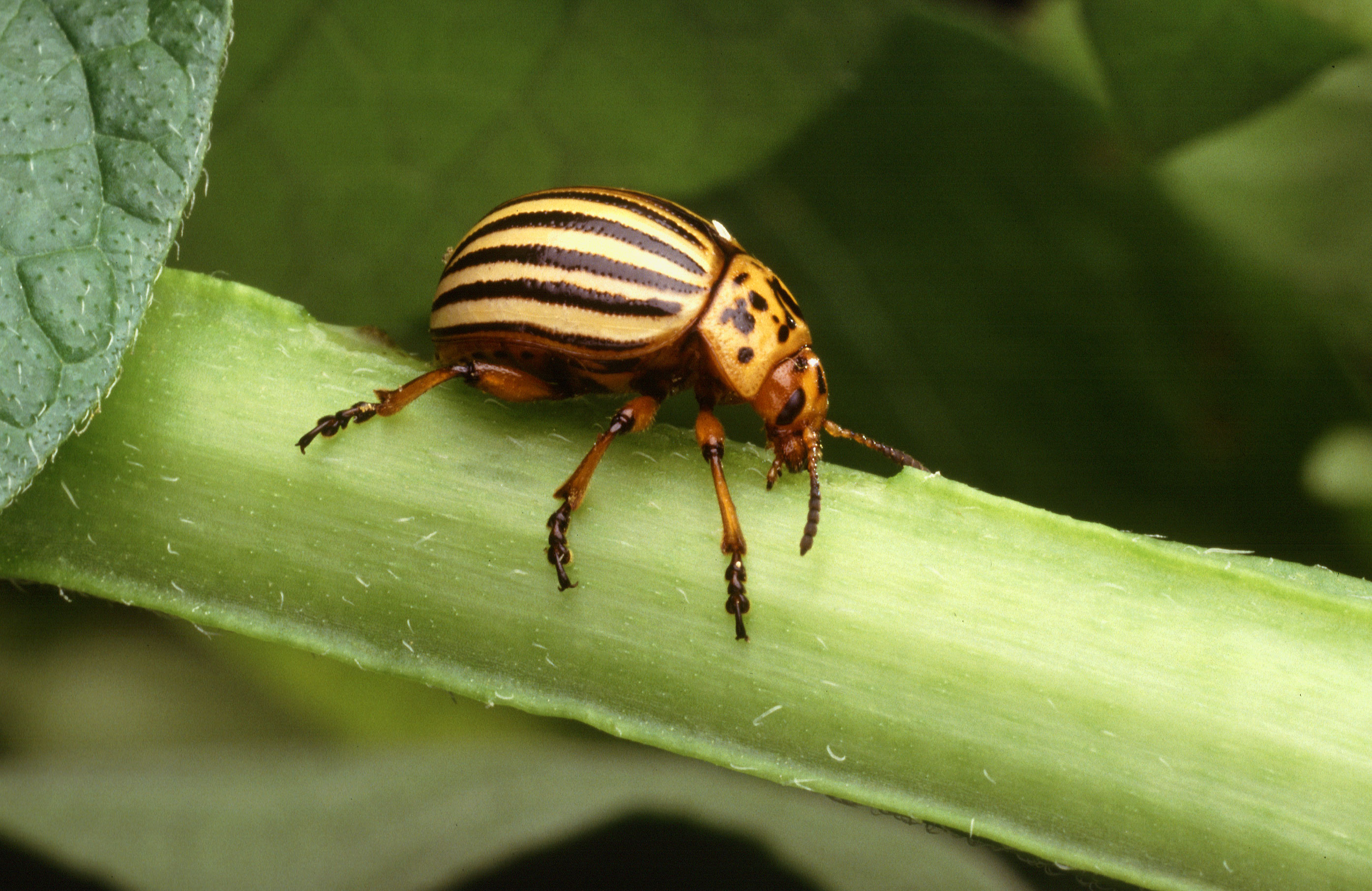
            Colorado potato beetle, Leptinotarsa decemlineata, a leaf beetle
        - Superfamily Curculionoidea Latreille, 1802
          - Family Nemonychidae Bedel, 1882
          - Family Anthribidae Billberg, 1820
          - Family †Ulyanidae Zherikhin, 1993
          - Family Belidae Schönherr, 1826
          - Family Caridae Thompson, 1992
          - Family Attelabidae Billberg, 1820
          - Family Brentidae Billberg, 1820
          - Family Brachyceridae Billberg, 1820
          - Family Curculionidae Latreille, 1802 (snout beetles, weevils, and bark beetles)
