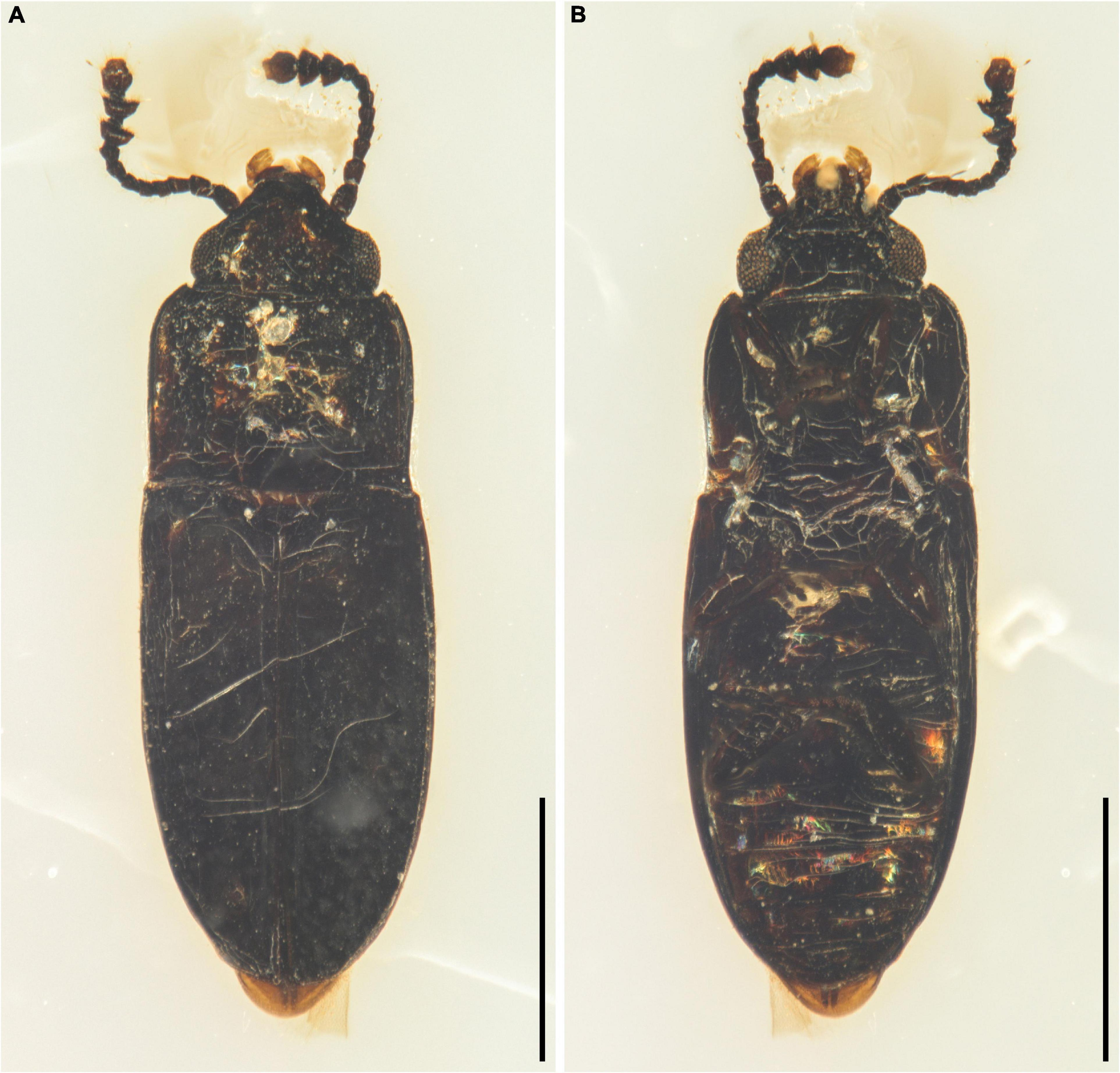

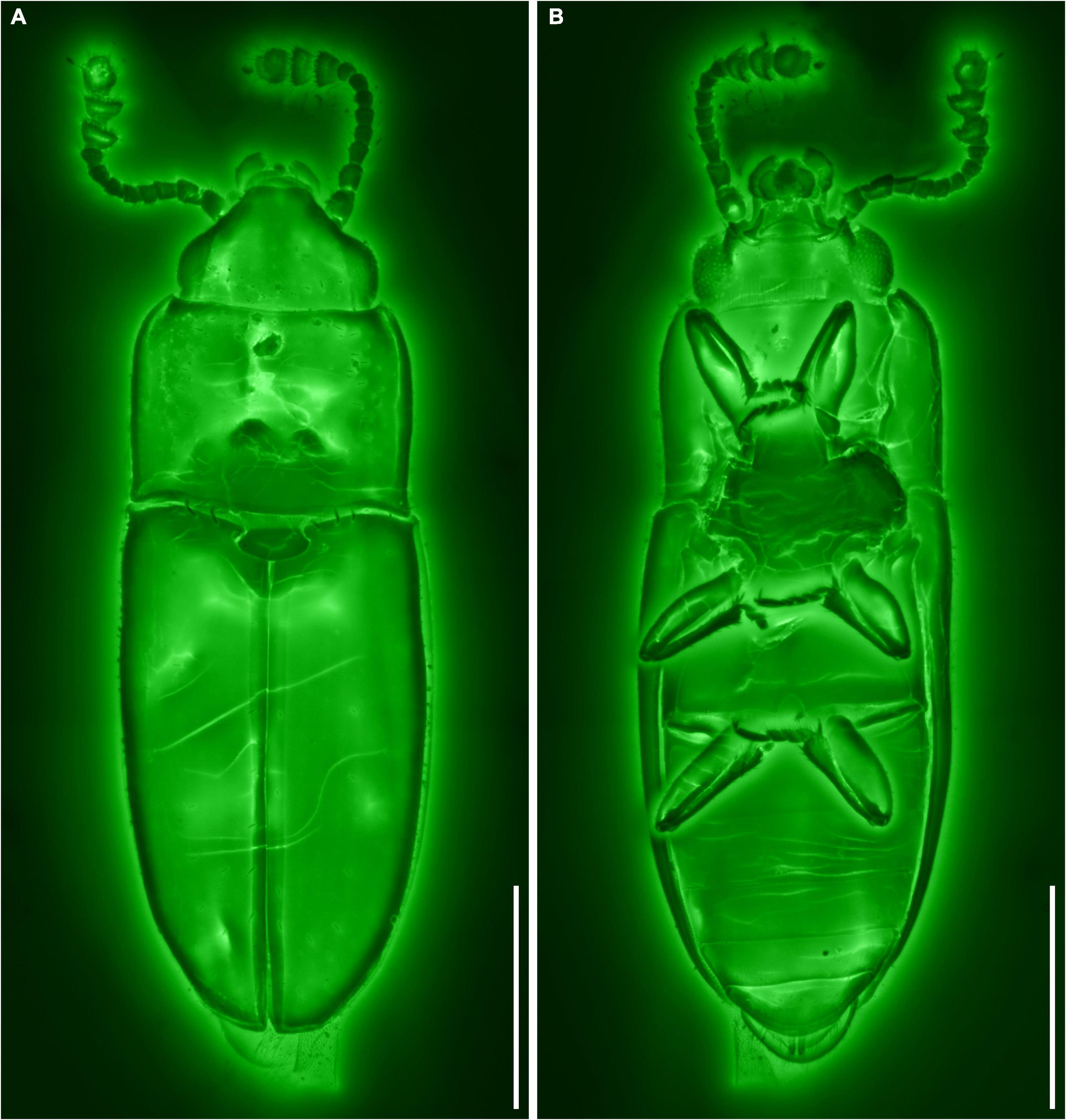

Scientific classification
- Kingdom: Animalia
- Phylum: Arthropoda
- Clade: Pancrustacea
- Class: Insecta
- Order: Coleoptera
- Suborder: Polyphaga
- Infraorder: Cucujiformia
- Superfamily: Cucujoidea
- Genus: †Alloterocucus; Li et al., 2022
- Species: †A. atratus

Binomial name
- †Alloterocucus atratus Li et al., 2022

= Alloterocucus =

Alloterocucus Temporal range: 99 Ma

Extinct genus of beetle

Alloterocucus is an extinct genus of beetle. It is known from a single species, Alloterocucus atratus, known from the mid Cretaceous (latest Albian-earliest Cenomanian) Burmese amber of Myanmar. It belongs to the clade Cucujiformia, probably Cucujoidea, and is not assigned to any family. Cladistic analysis suggests that it is closely related to Cyclaxyridae (sooty mold beetles), Tasmosalpingidae, and Lamingtoniidae, and is possibly most closely related to Lamingtoniidae.
