= Svataea =

Scientific classification
- Kingdom: Animalia
- Phylum: Arthropoda
- Class: Insecta
- Order: Coleoptera
- Suborder: Polyphaga
- Infraorder: Elateriformia
- Superfamily: Buprestoidea
- Family: Buprestidae
- Subfamily: Agrilinae
- Genus: Svataea; Alonso-Zarazaga & Roca-Cusachs, 2017

Synonyms
- Lakhonia Descarpentries & Villiers, 1967 (preoccupied)

Genus of beetles

Svataea is a genus of buprestid beetles.

== Species ==
- Svataea coomani (Bourgoin, 1924)
- Svataea harmandi (Descarpentries & Villiers, 1967)
- Svataea tonkinea (Descarpentries & Villiers, 1967)
