= Planidia (beetle) =

Scientific classification
- Kingdom: Animalia
- Phylum: Arthropoda
- Class: Insecta
- Order: Coleoptera
- Suborder: Polyphaga
- Infraorder: Elateriformia
- Superfamily: Buprestoidea
- Family: Buprestidae
- Genus: Planidia; Kerremans, 1899

Genus of beetles

Planidia is a genus of beetles in the family Buprestidae, the jewel beetles. They are native to southern and eastern Africa.

Species include:

- Planidia elongulata Obenberger, 1922
- Planidia freudei Jelinek, 1971
- Planidia hauseri Obenberger, 1931
- Planidia vansoni Obenberger, 1936
- Planidia velutina Kerremans, 1899
