= Maroantsetra superba =

Scientific classification
- Domain: Eukaryota
- Kingdom: Animalia
- Phylum: Arthropoda
- Class: Insecta
- Order: Coleoptera
- Suborder: Polyphaga
- Infraorder: Elateriformia
- Superfamily: Buprestoidea
- Family: Buprestidae
- Genus: Maroantsetra; Thery, 1937
- Species: M. superba

Binomial name
- Maroantsetra superba Thery, 1937

Genus of beetles

Maroantsetra superba is a species of beetle in the family Buprestidae, the only species in the genus Maroantsetra.
