= Propalticidae =

Scientific classification
- Kingdom: Animalia
- Phylum: Arthropoda
- Clade: Pancrustacea
- Class: Insecta
- Order: Coleoptera
- Suborder: Polyphaga
- Infraorder: Cucujiformia
- Superfamily: Cucujoidea
- Family: Propalticidae; Crowson, 1952

Genera
- Propalticus Sharp, 1879; Slipinskogenia Gimmel, 2011

Synonyms
- Laemophloeidade (Ganglbauer, 1899), Lathropidae (Casey, 1916), Nartheciidae (Casey, 1890)

Family of beetles

Propalticidae is a family of beetles, in the suborder Polyphaga. It contains two genera (Propalticus and Slipinskogenia) with the following species:

- Genus Propalticus Sharp, 1879
  - Propalticus acupinctus John, 1939
  - Propalticus africanus John, 1956
  - Propalticus bryanti John, 1960
  - Propalticus crassiceps John, 1960
  - Propalticus cuneiformis John, 1960
  - Propalticus decoomani John, 1960
  - Propalticus discogenioides John, 1960
  - Propalticus doddi John, 1960
  - Propalticus dybasi John, 1960
  - Propalticus indicus Sen Gupta, 1978
  - Propalticus inflatus John, 1943
  - Propalticus insularis John, 1960
  - Propalticus jansoni Sharp, 1882
  - Propalticus japonicus Nakane, 1966
  - Propalticus kiuchii Sasaji, 1971
  - Propalticus madagascariensis John, 1960
  - Propalticus mixtocomatus John, 1939
  - Propalticus morimotoi Kamiya, 1964
  - Propalticus oculatus Sharp, 1879
  - Propalticus ryukyuensis Kamiya, 1964
  - Propalticus saipanensis John, 1960
  - Propalticus santhomeae John, 1960
  - Propalticus sarawakensis John, 1960
  - Propalticus scriptitatus John, 1960
  - Propalticus sechellarum Scott, 1922
  - Propalticus sierraleonis John, 1960
  - Propalticus simplex Crowson & Sen Gupta, 1969
  - Propalticus striatus John, 1960
  - Propalticus tonkinensis John, 1960
  - Propalticus ulimanganus John, 1960
  - Propalticus virgatus John, 1939
  - Propalticus wainganus John, 1969
- Genus Slipinskogenia Gimmel, 2011
  - Slipinskogenia bilineata John, 1942
  - Slipinskogenia burgeoni John, 1942
  - Slipinskogenia decemarticulata John, 1960
  - Slipinskogenia disciformis Kolbe, 1897
  - Slipinskogenia disposita John, 1940
  - Slipinskogenia donisi John, 1956
  - Slipinskogenia hargreavesi John, 1960
  - Slipinskogenia latipenis John, 1942
  - Slipinskogenia pulchripicta John, 1942
  - Slipinskogenia schoutedeni John, 1942
  - Slipinskogenia trilineata John, 1940
