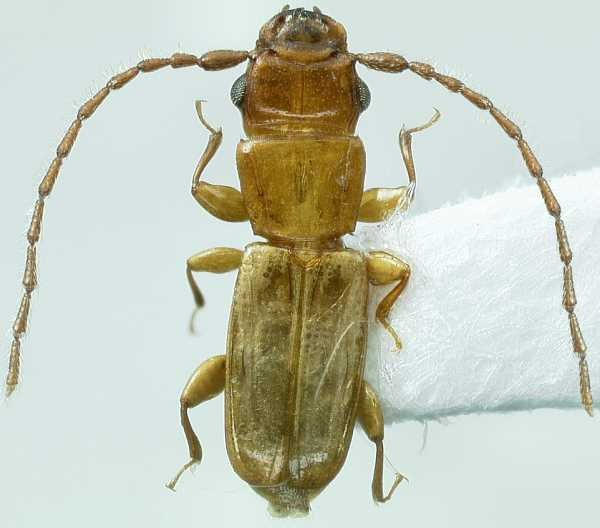
- Placonotus macrognathus

Scientific classification
- Domain: Eukaryota
- Kingdom: Animalia
- Phylum: Arthropoda
- Class: Insecta
- Order: Coleoptera
- Suborder: Polyphaga
- Infraorder: Cucujiformia
- Superfamily: Cucujoidea
- Family: Laemophloeidae
- Genus: Placonotus; MacLeay, 1871

= Placonotus =

Genus of beetles

Placonotus is a genus of beetles in the family Laemophloeidae. There are 40 currently recognized species, known from all continents except Antarctica. Placonotus species are small (~2mm), elongate, flattened beetles, characterized by long filiform antennae, presence of a frontoclypeal suture, open anterior coxal cavities, and broadly rounded intercoxal process of abdominal ventrite III. Males have the 8th abdominal segment modified to form claspers used during mating. Adults and larvae are found under dead bark, where they feed on fungi. Currently recognized species are:

- Placonotus africanus Lefkovitch
- Placonotus arizonensis Thomas
- Placonotus bolivari Grouvelle
- Placonotus debanus Mukhopadhyay
- Placonotus decoratus Grouvelle
- Placonotus dolce Lefkovitch
- Placonotus donacioides Wollaston
- Placonotus ealaensis Lefkovitch
- Placonotus embuensis Thomas
- Placonotus exornatus Grouvelle
- Placonotus falinorum Thomas
- Placonotus gladiator Thomas
- Placonotus granulatus Wollaston
- Placonotus himalaicus Mukhopadhyay & Sen Gupta
- Placonotus infimus Sharp
- Placonotus keralicus Mukhopadhyay & Sen Gupta
- Placonotus macrognathus Thomas
- Placonotus majus Lefkovitch
- Placonotus maya Thomas
- Placonotus mestus Lefkovitch
- Placonotus modestus Say
- Placonotus mossus Lefkovitch
- Placonotus nitens LeConte
- Placonotus orientalis Grouvelle
- Placonotus pallentipennis Reitter
- Placonotus patruelis Thomas
- Placonotus planifrons Thomas
- Placonotus politissimus Wollaston
- Placonotus proximus Grouvelle
- Placonotus pseudomodestus Thomas
- Placonotus pseudoproximus Mukhopadhyay & Sen Gupta
- Placonotus rigidus Olliff
- Placonotus saudicus Slipinski
- Placonotus subgranulatus Grouvelle
- Placonotus subtestaceus Grouvelle
- Placonotus subtruncatus Lefkovitch
- Placonotus tastus Lefkovitch
- Placonotus testaceus Fabricius
- Placonotus torsus Mukhopadhyay & Sen Gupta
- Placonotus zimmermanni LeConte

The genus has been treated taxonomically for several geographical regions: the New World; Africa; Europe; and India. The Asian, Pacific, and Australian faunas have not been worked and there are probably many unassigned and undescribed species.
