= Propalticus santhomeae =

Scientific classification
- Kingdom: Animalia
- Phylum: Arthropoda
- Class: Insecta
- Order: Coleoptera
- Suborder: Polyphaga
- Infraorder: Cucujiformia
- Family: Propalticidae
- Genus: Propalticus
- Species: P. santhomeae

Binomial name
- Propalticus santhomeae John, 1960

Species of beetle

Propalticus santhomeae is a species of cucujoid beetles of the family Propalticidae. It occurs in São Tomé and Príncipe on the island of São Tomé. The species was described in 1960.
