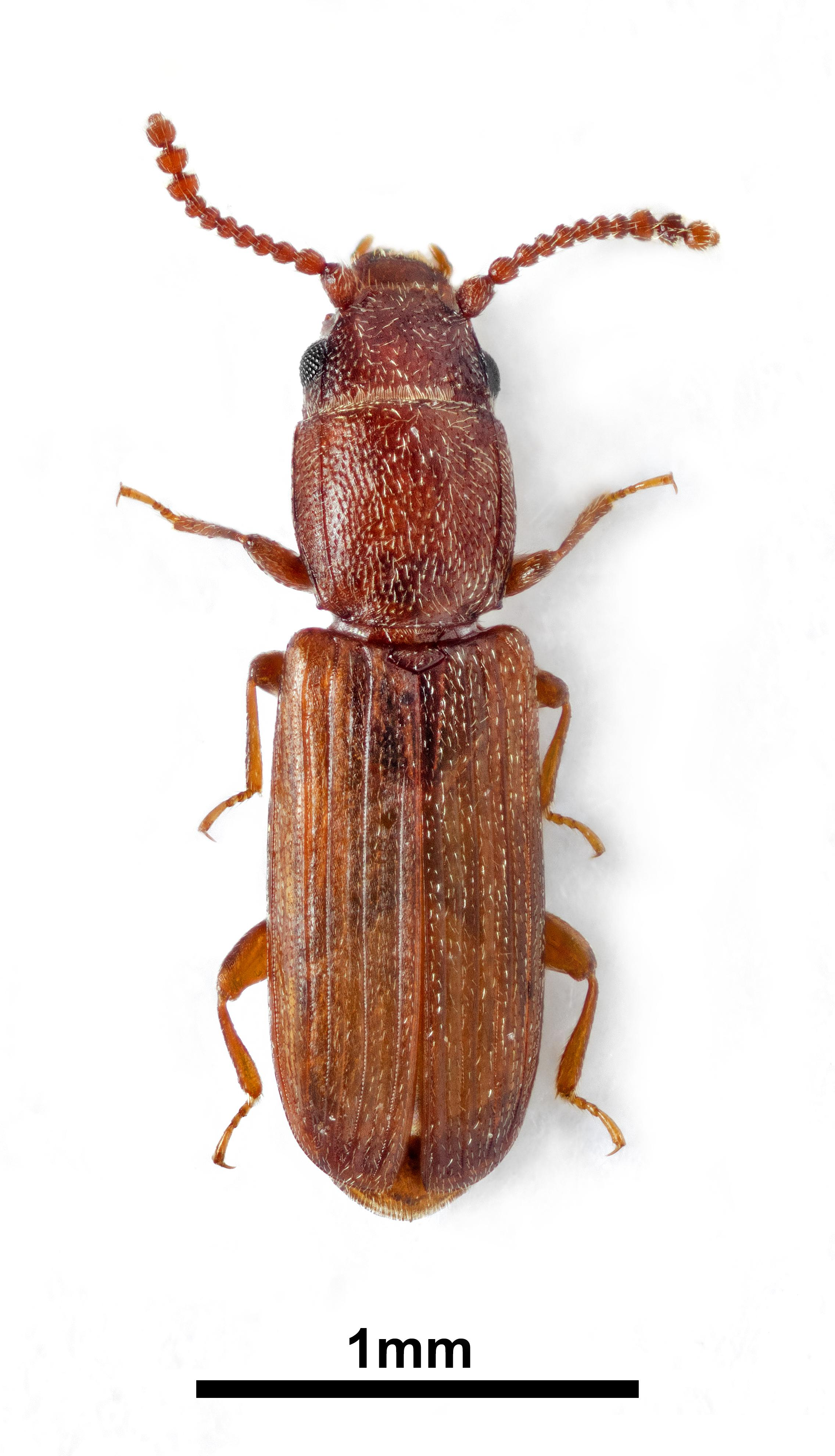

Scientific classification
- Kingdom: Animalia
- Phylum: Arthropoda
- Class: Insecta
- Order: Coleoptera
- Suborder: Polyphaga
- Infraorder: Cucujiformia
- Superfamily: Cucujoidea
- Family: Laemophloeidae
- Genus: Leptophloeus; Casey, 1916

= Leptophloeus =

Genus of beetles

Leptophloeus is a genus of beetles in the family Laemophloeidae, containing the following species:

- Leptophloeus abei Sasaji
- Leptophloeus alternans Erichson
- Leptophloeus angustulus LeConte
- Leptophloeus anormus Grouvelle
- Leptophloeus ater Lefkovitch
- Leptophloeus axillaris Wollaston
- Leptophloeus bupleuri Peyerimhof
- Leptophloeus capitus Lefkovitch
- Leptophloeus cassavae Lefkovitch
- Leptophloeus clematidis Erichson
- Leptophloeus convexiusculus (Grouvelle, 1877)
- Leptophloeus cornutus Lefkovitch
- Leptophloeus dichotomus Liu & Li, 2025
- Leptophloeus femoralis Sasaji
- Leptophloeus foveicollis Sasaji, 1986
- Leptophloeus hypobori Perris
- Leptophloeus janeti Grouvelle
- Leptophloeus juniperi Grouvelle
- Leptophloeus linearis Grouvelle
- Leptophloeus lucidus Grouvelle
- Leptophloeus mobilis Grouvelle
- Leptophloeus mucunae Lefkovitch
- Leptophloeus opaculus Grouvelle
- Leptophloeus parallelus Lefkovitch
- Leptophloeus perrisi Grouvelle
- Leptophloeus problematicus Lefkovitch
- Leptophloeus punctatus Lefkovitch
- Leptophloeus stenoides Wollaston
