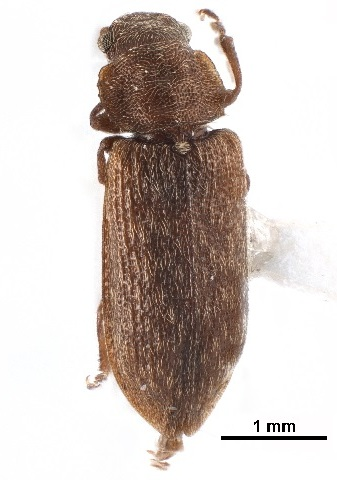
- Specimen of Ericmodes sylvaticus

Scientific classification
- Kingdom: Animalia
- Phylum: Arthropoda
- Clade: Pancrustacea
- Class: Insecta
- Order: Coleoptera
- Suborder: Polyphaga
- Infraorder: Cucujiformia
- Superfamily: Cucujoidea
- Family: Protocucujidae; Crowson, 1954

Genera
- Ericmodes

= Protocucujidae =

Family of beetles

Protocucujidae is a family of beetles, in the superfamily Cucujoidea. It has a single known genus, Ericmodes (Reitter, 1878) (syn Protocucujus Crowson, 1954). Species of Ericmodes are native to southern South America and Eastern Australia. Little is known of their biology, though adults and larvae probably live on vegetation, with adults having also been found in leaf litter and in flight.
