= Hobartiidae =

Scientific classification
- Kingdom: Animalia
- Phylum: Arthropoda
- Clade: Pancrustacea
- Class: Insecta
- Order: Coleoptera
- Suborder: Polyphaga
- Infraorder: Cucujiformia
- Superfamily: Cucujoidea
- Family: Hobartiidae; Sen Gupta & Crowson, 1966

Family of beetles

Hobartiidae is a family of beetles in the superfamily Cucujoidea. There are only two known genera, Hobartius (Sen Gupta & Crowson, 1966) and Hydnobioides (Sen Gupta & Crowson, 1966), with six species, five of which are native to Australia, and one species of Hobartius native to Chile and Argentina in South America. Members of the family are mycophagous, living in rotten, fungus infested logs of Araucaria, Nothofagus, and Eucalyptus, where they feed on the fruiting bodies of basidiomycetes.
