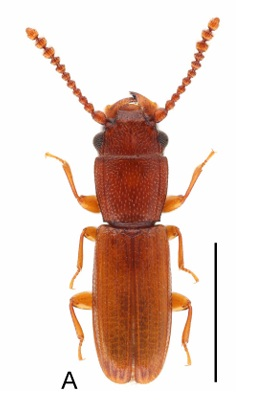

Scientific classification
- Domain: Eukaryota
- Kingdom: Animalia
- Phylum: Arthropoda
- Class: Insecta
- Order: Coleoptera
- Suborder: Polyphaga
- Infraorder: Cucujiformia
- Family: Laemophloeidae
- Genus: Leptophloeus
- Species: L. convexiusculus

Binomial name
- Leptophloeus convexiusculus (Grouvelle, 1877)

Synonyms
- Laemophloeus convexiusculus Grouvelle, 1877

= Leptophloeus convexiusculus =

Species of beetle

Leptophloeus convexiusculus is a species of beetle of the Laemophloeidae family. This species is found in China (Guangdong) and Japan.

Adults reach a length of about 2–2.1 mm. Adults are brown.
