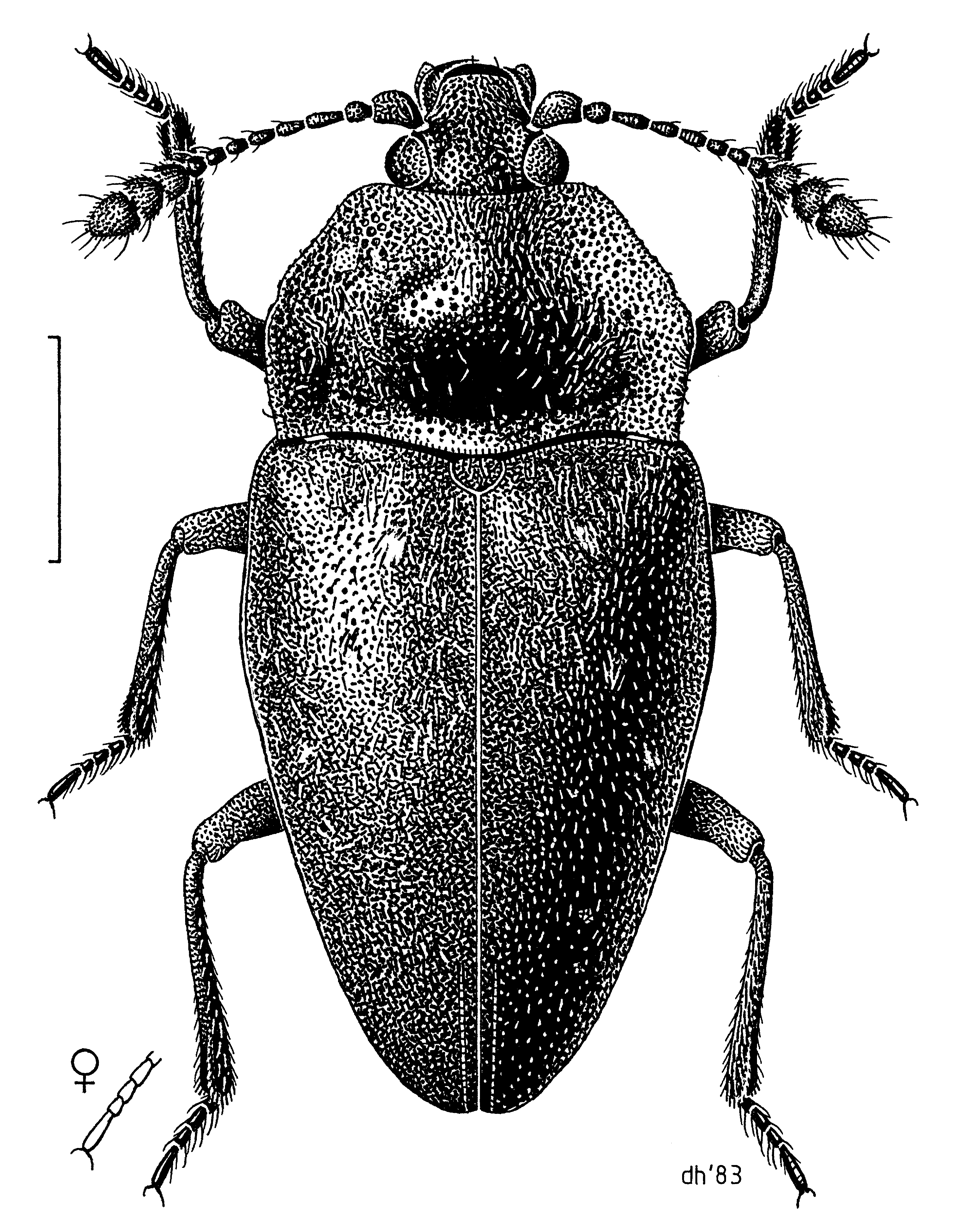
- Priasilpha obscura
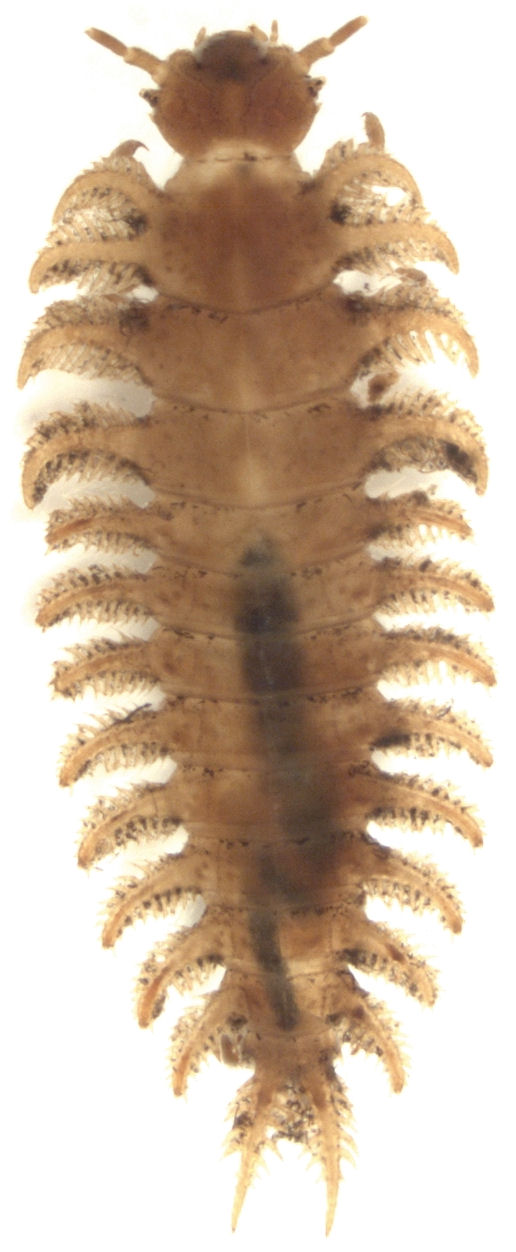
- Priasilpha obscura larva

Scientific classification
- Kingdom: Animalia
- Phylum: Arthropoda
- Clade: Pancrustacea
- Class: Insecta
- Order: Coleoptera
- Suborder: Polyphaga
- Infraorder: Cucujiformia
- Superfamily: Cucujoidea
- Family: Priasilphidae; Crowson, 1973

Genera
- See text

= Priasilphidae =

Family of beetles

Priasilphidae is a family of beetles in the superfamily Cucujoidea. They have a Gondwanan distribution, with the three known genera Chileosilpha, Priasilpha and Priastichus being native to Chile, New Zealand and Tasmania respectively. Most species are flightless, lacking wings. Priasilphids inhabit decaying wood and moss in forest habitats. They are likely mycophagous, feeding on fungi.

== Genera ==
These three genera belong to the family Priasilphidae:

- Chileosilpha Leschen, Lawrence & Ślipiński, 2005
- Priasilpha Broun, 1894
- Priastichus Crowson, 1973
