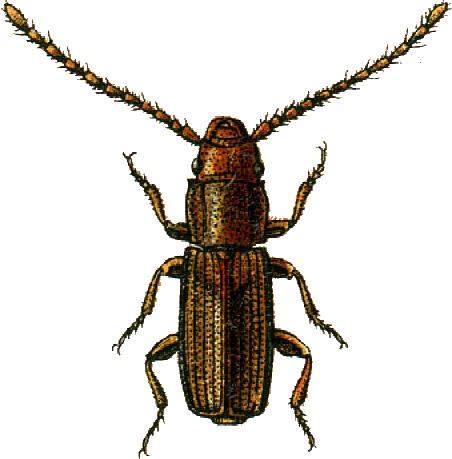

Scientific classification
- Domain: Eukaryota
- Kingdom: Animalia
- Phylum: Arthropoda
- Class: Insecta
- Order: Coleoptera
- Suborder: Polyphaga
- Infraorder: Cucujiformia
- Family: Laemophloeidae
- Genus: Placonotus
- Species: P. modestus

Binomial name
- Placonotus modestus (Say, 1827)

Synonyms
- Cucujus modestus Say, 1827; Laemophloeus gundlachi Grouvelle, 1874; Laemophloeus singularis Smith, 1851; Placonotus gundlachi (Grouvelle, 1874); Placonotus liquidus (Casey, 1916); Placonotus singularis (Smith, 1851); Silvanophloeus liquidus Casey, 1916

= Placonotus modestus =

Species of beetle

Placonotus modestus is a species of lined flat bark beetle in the family Laemophloeidae. It is found in the Caribbean Sea, Central America, and North America.
