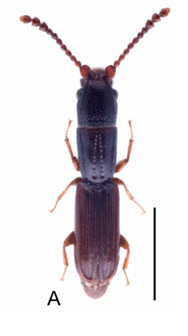

Scientific classification
- Domain: Eukaryota
- Kingdom: Animalia
- Phylum: Arthropoda
- Class: Insecta
- Order: Coleoptera
- Suborder: Polyphaga
- Infraorder: Cucujiformia
- Family: Laemophloeidae
- Genus: Leptophloeus
- Species: L. foveicollis

Binomial name
- Leptophloeus foveicollis Sasaji, 1986

= Leptophloeus foveicollis =

Species of beetle

Leptophloeus foveicollis is a species of beetle of the Laemophloeidae family. This species is found in China (Guangdong) and Japan.

Adults reach a length of about 2.3–2.7 mm. It is the most unique species within the genus and can be easily recognized by two rows of coarse punctures on the pronotum.
