= Placonotus nitens =

Scientific classification
- Domain: Eukaryota
- Kingdom: Animalia
- Phylum: Arthropoda
- Class: Insecta
- Order: Coleoptera
- Suborder: Polyphaga
- Infraorder: Cucujiformia
- Family: Laemophloeidae
- Genus: Placonotus
- Species: P. nitens

Binomial name
- Placonotus nitens (LeConte, 1854)

Synonyms
- Laemophloeus bullatus LeConte, 1856; Laemophloeus nitens LeConte, 1854; Placonotus bullatus (LeConte, 1856)

Species of beetle

Placonotus nitens is a species of lined flat bark beetle in the family Laemophloeidae. It is found in North America.
