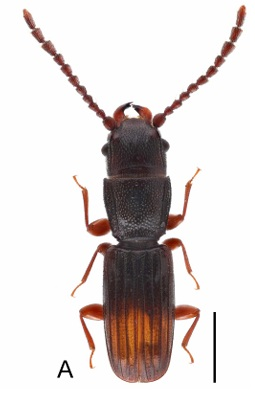

Scientific classification
- Domain: Eukaryota
- Kingdom: Animalia
- Phylum: Arthropoda
- Class: Insecta
- Order: Coleoptera
- Suborder: Polyphaga
- Infraorder: Cucujiformia
- Family: Laemophloeidae
- Genus: Leptophloeus
- Species: L. dichotomus

Binomial name
- Leptophloeus dichotomus Liu & Li, 2025

= Leptophloeus dichotomus =

Species of beetle

Leptophloeus dichotomus is a species of beetle of the Laemophloeidae family. This species is found in China (Guangdong).

Adults reach a length of about 2.5–3.8 mm. They have a brownish red body, while the legs, antennae, mouthparts and humeral areas of the elytra are somewhat paler.

== Etymology ==
The species name is derived from Latin dichotomos (meaning cut in two) and refers to the bifurcate dorsal tooth on the apex of the mandible in males.
