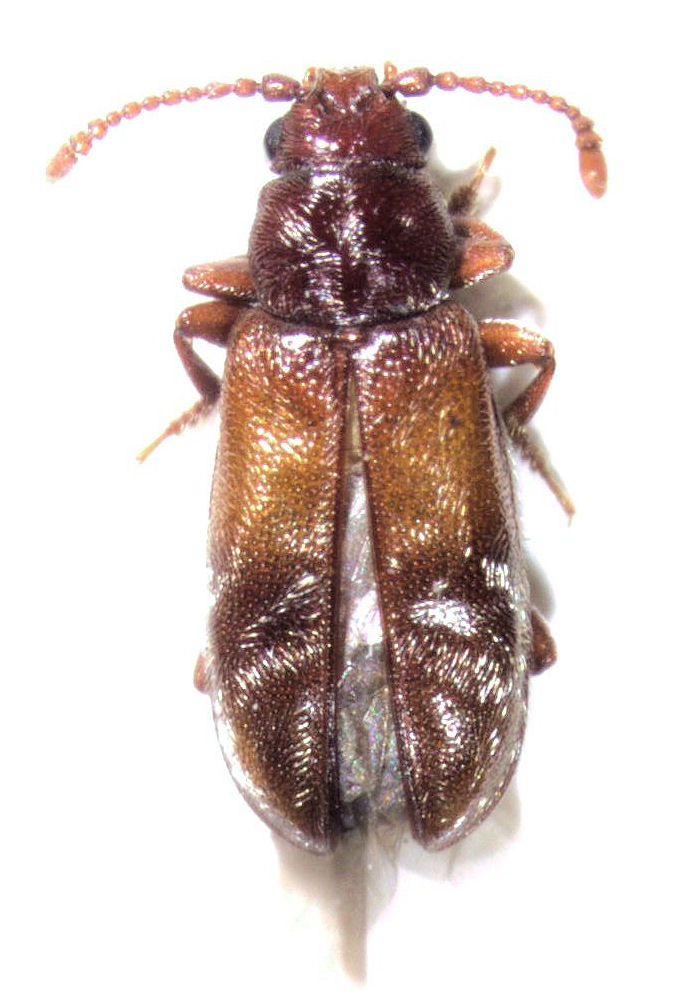
- Taphropiestes electa

Scientific classification
- Kingdom: Animalia
- Phylum: Arthropoda
- Clade: Pancrustacea
- Class: Insecta
- Order: Coleoptera
- Suborder: Polyphaga
- Infraorder: Cucujiformia
- Superfamily: Cucujoidea
- Family: Cavognathidae; Sen Gupta & Crowson, 1966

= Cavognathidae =

Family of beetles

Cavognathidae is a family of beetles, in the superfamily Cucujoidea. It contains a single genus, Taphropiestes (Reitter 1875) (Neocercus Broun, 1921, Cavognatha Crowson 1964 and Zeonidicola Crowson, 1973) with around a dozen species known from South America, Australia and New Zealand. In Australian and New Zealand species adults and larvae have been found living in bird nests, but their ecology is unclear. They are possibly scavengers.
