= Propalticus =

Scientific classification
- Kingdom: Animalia
- Phylum: Arthropoda
- Clade: Pancrustacea
- Class: Insecta
- Order: Coleoptera
- Suborder: Polyphaga
- Infraorder: Cucujiformia
- Family: Propalticidae
- Genus: Propalticus; Sharp, 1879

Genus of beetles

Propalticus is a genus of cucujiform beetles in the family Propalticidae. The genus was named and described by David Sharp in 1879.

== Species ==
- Propalticus acupinctus (John, 1939)
- Propalticus africanus (John, 1956)
- Propalticus bryanti John, 1960
- Propalticus crassiceps John, 1960
- Propalticus cuneiformis John, 1960
- Propalticus decoomani John, 1960
- Propalticus discogenioides John, 1960
- Propalticus doddi John, 1960
- Propalticus dybasi John, 1960
- Propalticus indicus Sen Gupta, 1978
- Propalticus inflatus (John, 1943)
- Propalticus insularis John, 1960
- Propalticus jansoni Sharp, 1882
- Propalticus japonicus Nakane, 1966
- Propalticus jarawa Pal, 2008
- Propalticus kiuchii Sasaji, 1971
- Propalticus madagascariensis John, 1960
- Propalticus mixtocomatus (John, 1939)
- Propalticus morimotoi Kamiya, 1964
- Propalticus oculatus Sharp, 1879
- Propalticus ryukyuensis Kamiya, 1964
- Propalticus saipanensis John, 1960
- Propalticus santhomeae John, 1960
- Propalticus sarawakensis John, 1960
- Propalticus scriptitatus John, 1960
- Propalticus sechellarum Scott, 1922
- Propalticus sierraleonis John, 1960
- Propalticus simplex Crowson & Sen Gupta, 1969
- Propalticus striatus John, 1960
- Propalticus tonkinensis John, 1960
- Propalticus ulimanganus John, 1960
- Propalticus virgatus (John, 1939)
- Propalticus wainganus John, 1969
