= Placonotus politissimus =

Scientific classification
- Domain: Eukaryota
- Kingdom: Animalia
- Phylum: Arthropoda
- Class: Insecta
- Order: Coleoptera
- Suborder: Polyphaga
- Infraorder: Cucujiformia
- Family: Laemophloeidae
- Genus: Placonotus
- Species: P. politissimus

Binomial name
- Placonotus politissimus (Wollaston, 1867)

Synonyms
- Laemophloeus commixtus Grouvelle, 1912; Laemophloeus mirus Grouvelle, 1905; Laemophloeus politissimus Wollaston, 1867; Laemophloeus victus Kessel, 1926; Placonotus commixtus (Grouvelle, 1912); Placonotus mirus (Grouvelle, 1905); Placonotus victus (Kessel, 1926)

Species of beetle

Placonotus politissimus is a species of lined flat bark beetle in the family Laemophloeidae. It is found in Africa, the Caribbean, Central America, North America, and South America.
