= Hymaea =

Scientific classification
- Domain: Eukaryota
- Kingdom: Animalia
- Phylum: Arthropoda
- Class: Insecta
- Order: Coleoptera
- Suborder: Polyphaga
- Infraorder: Cucujiformia
- Family: Phloeostichidae
- Genus: Hymaea; Pascoe, 1869

Genus of beetles

Hymaea is a genus of beetles in the family Phloeostichidae.

== Species ==
These species belong to the genus Hymaea

- Hymaea parallela Carter, 1936
- Hymaea magna Sen Gupta & Crowson, 1966
- Hymaea succinifera Pascoe, 1869
