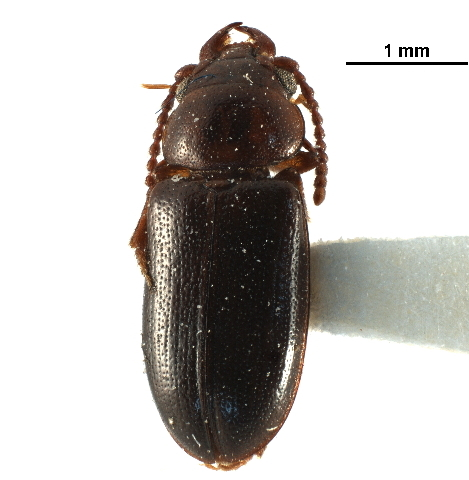
- Specimen of Paracucujus

Scientific classification
- Kingdom: Animalia
- Phylum: Arthropoda
- Clade: Pancrustacea
- Class: Insecta
- Order: Coleoptera
- Suborder: Polyphaga
- Infraorder: Cucujiformia
- Superfamily: Cucujoidea
- Family: Boganiidae; Sen Gupta & Crowson, 1966

Subfamilies
- See text

= Boganiidae =

Boganiidae Temporal range: Callovian–Present

Family of beetles

Boganiidae is a family of beetles, in the superfamily Cucujoidea. Members of the family are found in southern Africa, Australia and New Caledonia. Adults and larvae are pollenivorous, feeding on the pollen of cycads and flowering plants of the families Myrtaceae, Meliaceae, Cunoniaceae and Elaeocarpaceae. Metacucujus and Paracucujus act as pollinators for cycads Encephalartos and Macrozamia respectively. This association with cycads goes back to at least the Mid-Cretaceous, with an extinct form being found with preserved cycad pollen in 99 million year old Burmese amber.

== Subfamilies and genera ==
- †Palaeoboganium Liu et al. 2017 Daohugou, China, Middle Jurassic (Callovian)
- Subfamily Boganiinae Sen Gupta and Crowson 1966
  - Afroboganium Endrödy-Younga & Crowson, 1986 Africa
  - Boganium Sen Gupta & Crowson, 1966 Australia
  - †Cretoboganium Cai and Huang 2018 Burmese amber, Myanmar, Late Cretaceous (Cenomanian)
- Paracucujinae Endrödy-Younga & Crowson, 1986
  - Athertonium Crowson, 1990 Australia
  - †Cretoparacucujus Cai & Escalona, 2018 Burmese amber, Myanmar, Cenomanian
  - Dzumacium Escalona, Lawrence, Wanat & Ślipiński, 2015 New Caledonia
  - Metacucujus Endrödy-Younga & Crowson, 1986 Africa
  - Paracucujus Sen Gupta & Crowson, 1966 Australia
