= Placonotus zimmermanni =

Scientific classification
- Domain: Eukaryota
- Kingdom: Animalia
- Phylum: Arthropoda
- Class: Insecta
- Order: Coleoptera
- Suborder: Polyphaga
- Infraorder: Cucujiformia
- Family: Laemophloeidae
- Genus: Placonotus
- Species: P. zimmermanni

Binomial name
- Placonotus zimmermanni (LeConte, 1854)

Synonyms
- Laemophloeus zimmermanni LeConte, 1854; Placonotus apertus (Casey, 1916); Placonotus illustris (Casey, 1916); Placonotus sobrinus (Casey, 1916); Silvanophloeus apertus Casey, 1916; Silvanophloeus illustris Casey, 1916; Silvanophloeus sobrinus Casey, 1916

Species of beetle

Placonotus zimmermanni is a species of lined flat bark beetle in the family Laemophloeidae. It is found in North America.
