= Hobartius =

Scientific classification
- Kingdom: Animalia
- Phylum: Arthropoda
- Clade: Pancrustacea
- Class: Insecta
- Order: Coleoptera
- Suborder: Polyphaga
- Infraorder: Cucujiformia
- Family: Hobartiidae
- Genus: Hobartius; Sen Gupta & Crowson, 1966
- Species: H. tasmanicus

Binomial name
- Hobartius tasmanicus Sen Gupta & Crowson, 1966

Genus of beetles

Hobartius is a genus of rare beetles found in Southern Australia. The genus was first described in 1966 by Sen Gupta and Crowson. There is only one described species, Hobartius tasmanicus. It is a microscopic beetle. Its head is roughly 1mm wide.
