= Leptophloeus angustulus =

Scientific classification
- Kingdom: Animalia
- Phylum: Arthropoda
- Class: Insecta
- Order: Coleoptera
- Suborder: Polyphaga
- Infraorder: Cucujiformia
- Family: Laemophloeidae
- Genus: Leptophloeus
- Species: L. angustulus

Binomial name
- Leptophloeus angustulus (LeConte, 1866)

Synonyms
- Laemophloeus angustulus LeConte, 1866

Species of beetle

Leptophloeus angustulus is a species of lined flat bark beetle in the family Laemophloeidae. It is found in North America.
