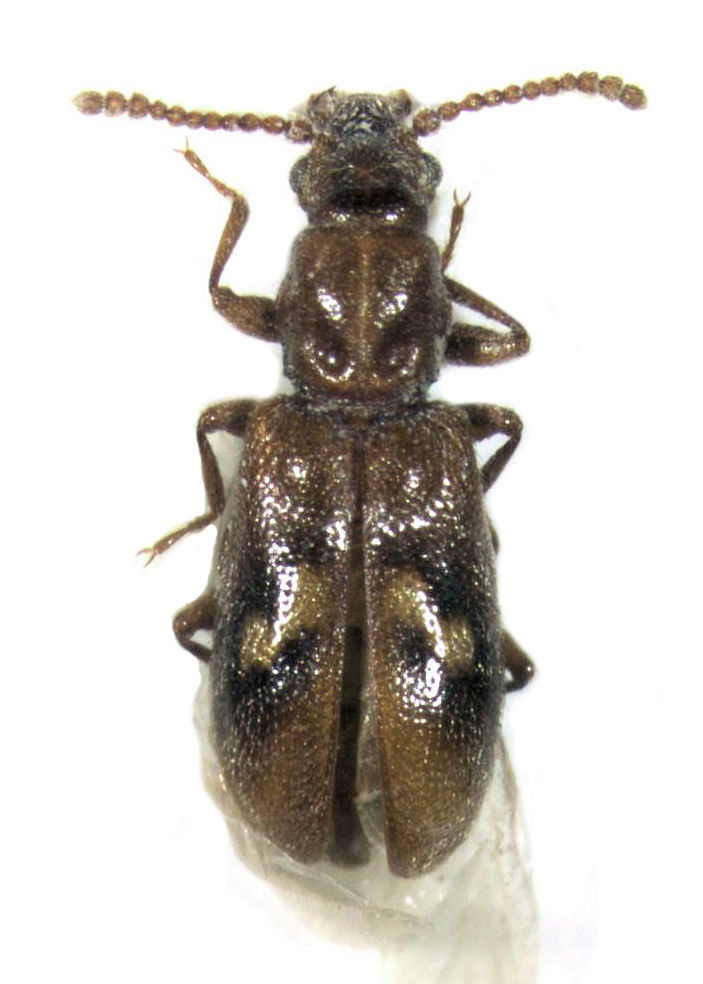
- Agapytho foveicollis

Scientific classification
- Kingdom: Animalia
- Phylum: Arthropoda
- Clade: Pancrustacea
- Class: Insecta
- Order: Coleoptera
- Suborder: Polyphaga
- Infraorder: Cucujiformia
- Superfamily: Cucujoidea
- Family: Agapythidae; Sen Gupta & Crowson, 1969
- Genus: Agapytho; Broun, 1921
- Species: A. foveicollis

Binomial name
- Agapytho foveicollis Broun, 1921

= Agapytho =

Genus of beetles

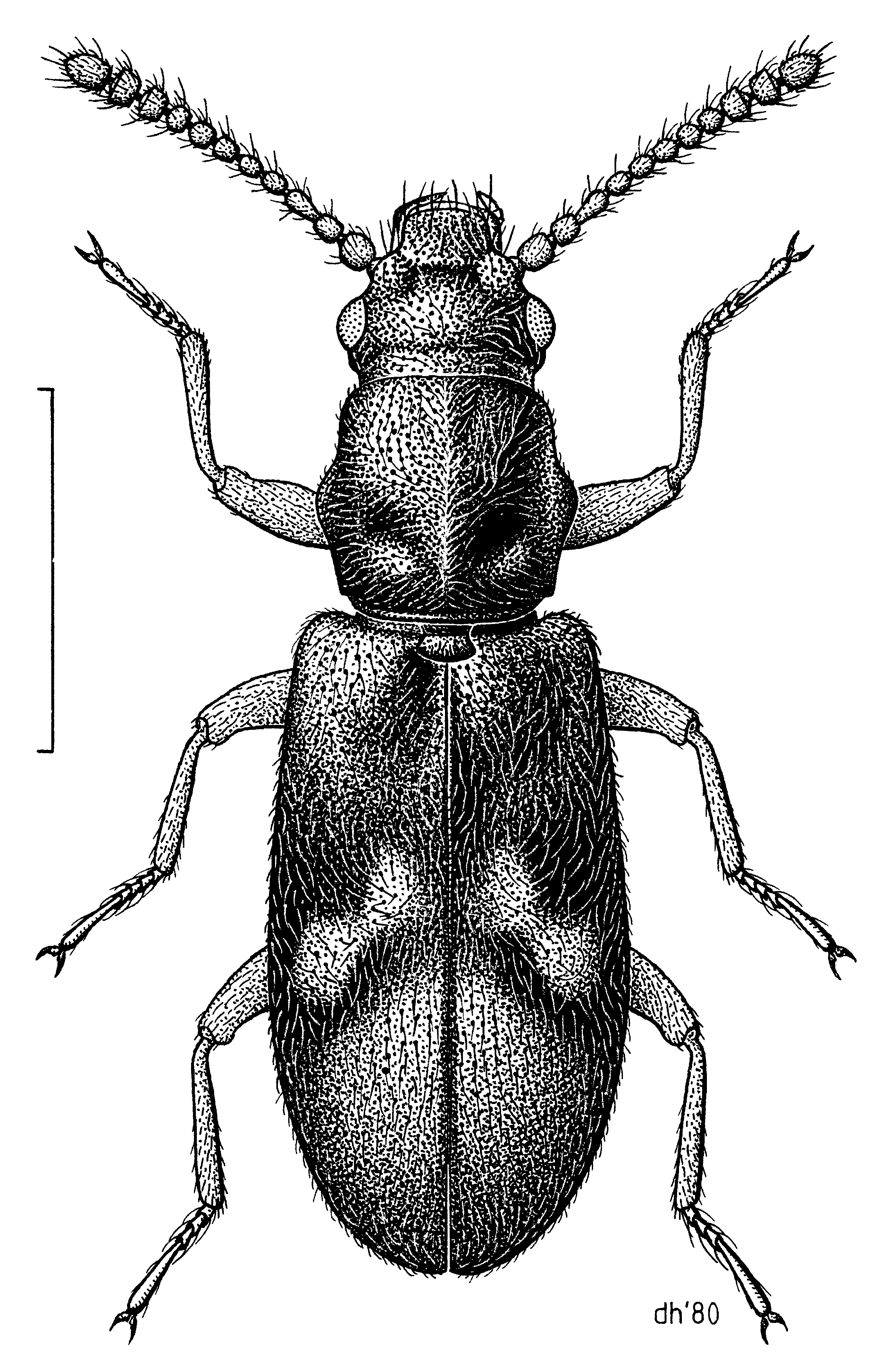
Drawing by Des Helmore

Agapytho is the only genus of beetles in the family Agapythidae. The genus contains a single species, Agapytho foveicollis, which is endemic to New Zealand. Larvae and adults are found on sooty mold growing on Nothofagus trees. Gut contents indicate that at least adult Agapytho consume the sooty mould as part of their diet.
