= Declinia =

Scientific classification
- Domain: Eukaryota
- Kingdom: Animalia
- Phylum: Arthropoda
- Class: Insecta
- Order: Coleoptera
- Suborder: Polyphaga
- Infraorder: Elateriformia
- Superfamily: Scirtoidea
- Family: Decliniidae; Nikitsky, Lawrence, Kirejtshuk & Gratshev, 1994
- Genus: Declinia; Nikitsky, Lawrence, Kirejtshuk & Gratshev, 1994

Family of beetles

Decliniidae is a family of beetles belonging to Scirtoidea. It contains the single genus Declinia with two species, D. relicta and D. versicolor, found in the Russian Far East and Japan, respectively. Little is known of their ecology, and their larvae are unknown. Specimens of D. relicta were found with pollen grains in their gut.

== Species ==
- Declinia relicta Nikitsky, Lawrence, Kirejtshuk & Gratshev, 1994
- Declinia versicolor Sakai & Satô, 1996
