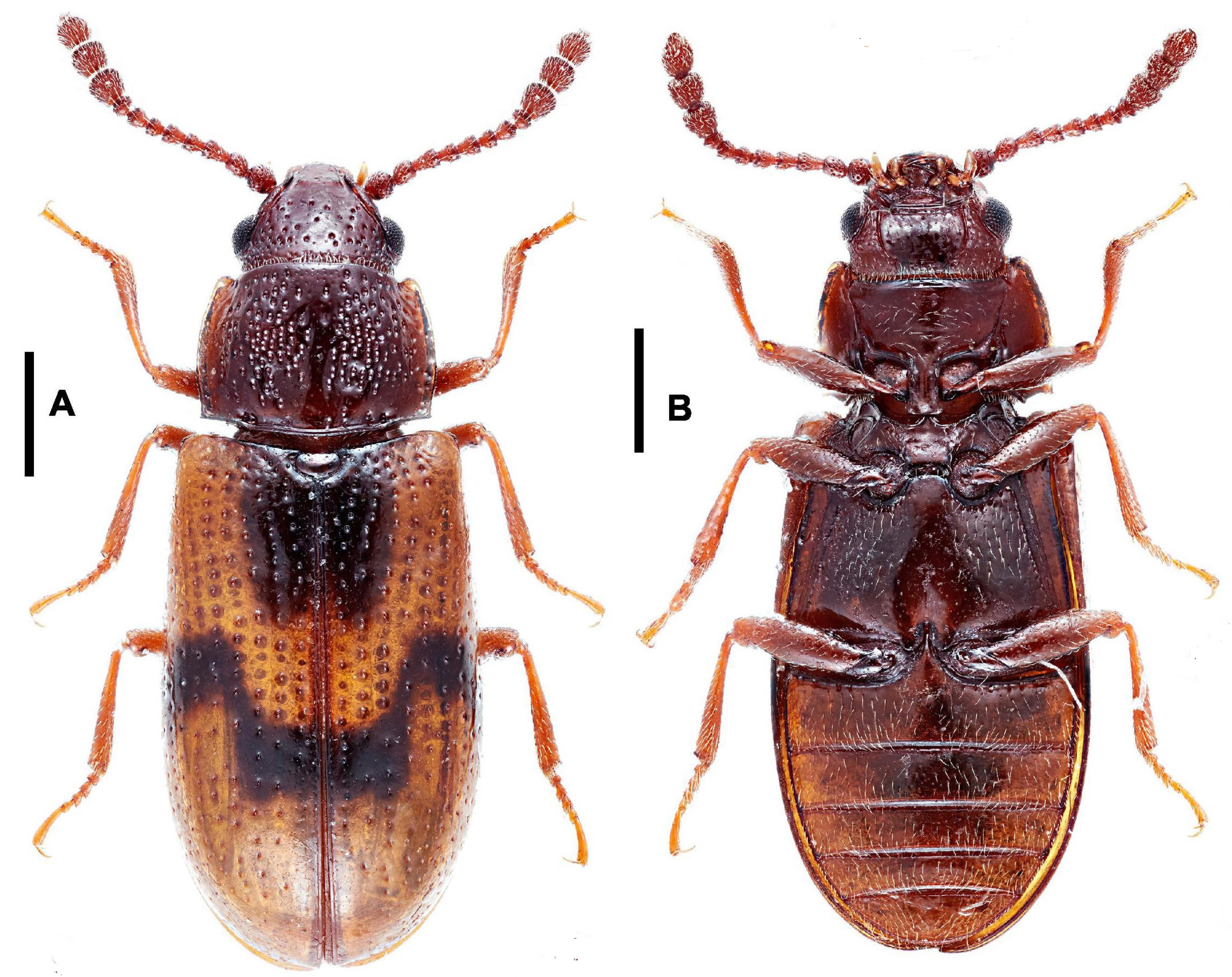
- Specimen of Lamingtonium loebli

Scientific classification
- Kingdom: Animalia
- Phylum: Arthropoda
- Clade: Pancrustacea
- Class: Insecta
- Order: Coleoptera
- Suborder: Polyphaga
- Infraorder: Cucujiformia
- Superfamily: Cucujoidea
- Family: Lamingtoniidae; Gupta & Crowson, 1969
- Genus: Lamingtonium; Gupta & Crowson, 1969

Type species
- Lamingtonium binnaburrense Gupta & Crowson, 1969

Species
- Lamingtonium binnaburrense Gupta & Crowson, 1969; Lamingtonium loebli Lawrence & Leschen, 2003; Lamingtonium thayerae Lawrence & Leschen, 2003

= Lamingtonium =

Genus of beetles

Lamingtonium is the only genus in the family Lamingtoniidae, of the beetle superfamily Cucujoidea. It contains three species endemic to Australia. The holotype of the type species was collected on at Lamington National Park, Binna Burra, Queensland under the bark of a dead tree. The adults and larvae of two species have been found associated with basidiocarps of fungi belonging to the family Polyporaceae.
