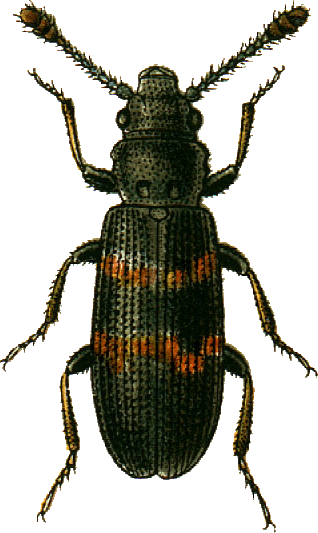
- Phloeostichus denticollis

Scientific classification
- Kingdom: Animalia
- Phylum: Arthropoda
- Class: Insecta
- Order: Coleoptera
- Suborder: Polyphaga
- Infraorder: Cucujiformia
- Superfamily: Cucujoidea
- Family: Phloeostichidae; Reitter, 1911

Genera
- See text

= Phloeostichidae =

Phloeostichidae Temporal range: Cenomanian–Recent

Family of beetles

Phloeostichidae is a family of beetles in the superfamily Cucujoidea. They are typically found under the bark of dead trees. Larvae have been found to consume plant tissue and some fungi, while the adults appear to be exclusively fungivores. The family contains four extant genera, Phloeostichus is native to the Palearctic, Rhopalobrachium is native to central-southern South America and eastern Australia, Hymaea is native to southeastern Australia, and Bunyastichus is found in Tasmania.

== Genera ==
- Bunyastichus Leschen, Lawrence & Ślipiński, 2005
- Phloeostichus Redtenbacher, 1842
- Rhopalobrachium Boheman, 1858
- Hymaea Pascoe, 1869
- †Pleuroceratos Poinar and Kirejtshuk 2008 Burmese amber, Myanmar, Late Cretaceous (Cenomanian)
