= Belohina =

Scientific classification
- Kingdom: Animalia
- Phylum: Arthropoda
- Clade: Pancrustacea
- Class: Insecta
- Order: Coleoptera
- Suborder: Polyphaga
- Infraorder: Scarabaeiformia
- Superfamily: Scarabaeoidea
- Family: Belohinidae; Paulian, 1959
- Genus: Belohina; Paulian, 1959
- Species: B. inexpectata

Binomial name
- Belohina inexpectata Paulian, 1959

Species of beetles

Belohina inexpectata is a species of polyphagan beetles and the sole member of family Belohinidae. It is endemic to southern Madagascar. Only a few specimens of this species are known.
