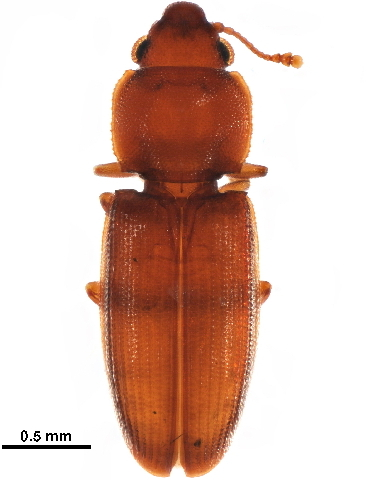

Scientific classification
- Kingdom: Animalia
- Phylum: Arthropoda
- Clade: Pancrustacea
- Class: Insecta
- Order: Coleoptera
- Suborder: Polyphaga
- Infraorder: Cucujiformia
- Superfamily: Cucujoidea
- Family: Myraboliidae
- Genus: Myrabolia; Reitter, 1876

= Myrabolia =

Genus of beetles

Myrabolia is the only genus in the beetle family Myraboliidae in the superfamily Cucujoidea. It has about 13 species, found in Australia. Adults and possibly larvae live under the bark of Eucalyptus trees.

== Species ==
These species are members of the genus Myrabolia.

- Myrabolia micra Tomaszewska & Slipinski, 2008
- Myrabolia elongata Tomaszewska & Slipinski, 2008
- Myrabolia brevicornis (Erichson 1842)
- Myrabolia grouvelliana Reitter 1878
- Myrabolia kioloa Tomaszewska & Slipinski, 2008
- Myrabolia pelion Tomaszewska & Slipinski, 2008
- Myrabolia lawrencei Tomaszewska & Slipinski, 2008
- Myrabolia australis Tomaszewska & Slipinski, 2008
- Myrabolia longicornis Blackburn 1903
- Myrabolia blackburni Tomaszewska & Slipinski, 2008
- Myrabolia lindensis Blackburn 1892
- Myrabolia leai (Grouvelle, 1911)
- Myrabolia tasmanica Tomaszewska & Slipinski, 2008
