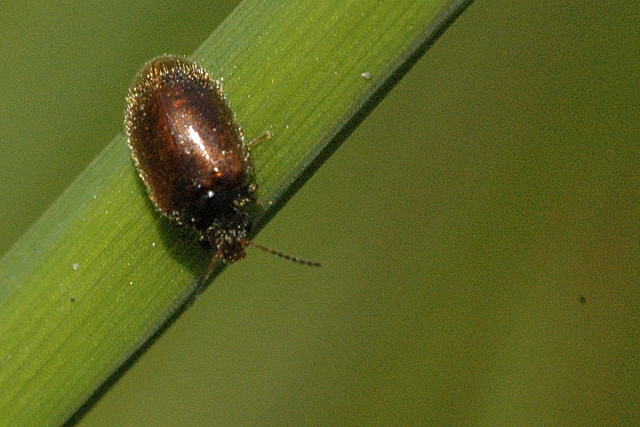
- Contacyphon padi (Scirtidae)

Scientific classification
- Kingdom: Animalia
- Phylum: Arthropoda
- Clade: Pancrustacea
- Class: Insecta
- Order: Coleoptera
- Suborder: Polyphaga
- Infraorder: Elateriformia
- Superfamily: Scirtoidea; Fleming, 1821

Families
- See text

= Scirtoidea =

Superfamily of beetles

Scirtoidea is a superfamily of beetles. It is traditionally considered to consist of four families: Clambidae, Decliniidae, Eucinetidae and Scirtidae. However, genetic studies have suggested that Clambidae and Eucinetidae belong to a separate superfamily Clamboidea, which also includes Derodontidae. Scirtoidea and Clamboidea are the two earliest diverging lineages of living polyphagans.

Two extinct families have also been assigned to this group:

- † Mesocinetidae Kirejtshuk and Ponomarenko 2010 Late Jurassic-Early Cretaceous (Asia)
- † Elodophthalmidae Kirejtshuk and Azar 2008 monotypic, Lebanese amber, Barremian
