= Slipinskogenia =

Scientific classification
- Kingdom: Animalia
- Phylum: Arthropoda
- Clade: Pancrustacea
- Class: Insecta
- Order: Coleoptera
- Suborder: Polyphaga
- Infraorder: Cucujiformia
- Family: Laemophloeidae
- Genus: Slipinskogenia; Gimmel, 2011

Synonyms
- Discogenia Kolbe, 1897

Genus of beetles

Slipinskogenia is a genus of beetle in the family Laemopholeidae. It was first described in 1897 by Kolbe, who named the genus Discogenia. It was later renamed by Gimmel in 2011, to Slipinskogenia. There are 11 accepted species, located in West and Central Africa.

== Species ==
- Slipinskogenia bilineata John, 1942
- Slipinskogenia burgeoni John, 1942
- Slipinskogenia decemarticulata John, 1960
- Slipinskogenia disciformis Kolbe, 1897
- Slipinskogenia disposita John, 1940
- Slipinskogenia donisi John, 1956
- Slipinskogenia hargreavesi John, 1960
- Slipinskogenia latipenis John, 1942
- Slipinskogenia pulchripicta John, 1942
- Slipinskogenia schoutedeni John, 1942
- Slipinskogenia trilineata John, 1940
