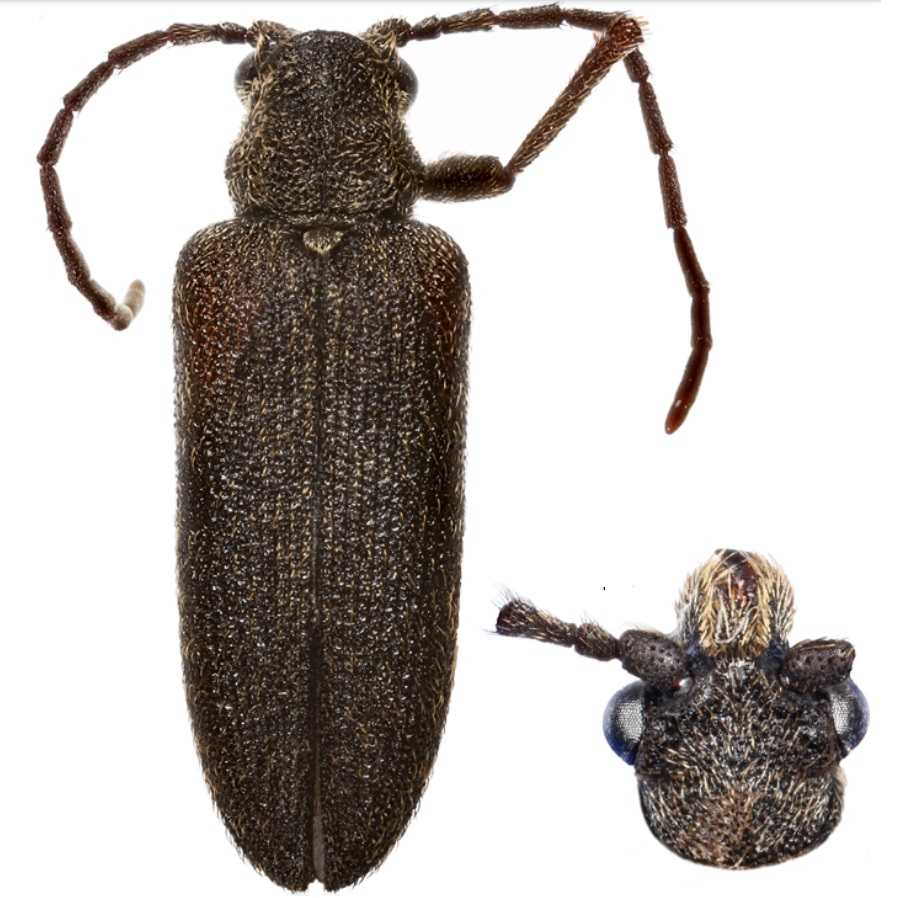
- Specimen of Rhinorhipus with closeup of the head (right)

Scientific classification
- Kingdom: Animalia
- Phylum: Arthropoda
- Class: Insecta
- Order: Coleoptera
- Suborder: Polyphaga
- Infraorder: Elateriformia
- Superfamily: Rhinorhipoidea
- Family: Rhinorhipidae
- Genus: Rhinorhipus; Lawrence, 1988
- Species: R. tamborinensis

Binomial name
- Rhinorhipus tamborinensis Lawrence, 1988

= Rhinorhipus =

Genus of beetles

Rhinorhipus is a genus of beetles that contains a single species, Rhinorhipus tamborinensis from southern Queensland, Australia. It is the sole member of the family Rhinorhipidae and superfamily Rhinorhipoidea. It is an isolated lineage not closely related to any other living beetle, estimated to have split from other beetles at least 200 million years ago, with studies either considering them the sister group to Elateriformia, or as a member of Polyphaga, sister to all other lineages in that group.

They exhibit feigning death (thanatosis) when disturbed. Their ecology is poorly known; based on their morphology, it is likely that they are fossorial.
