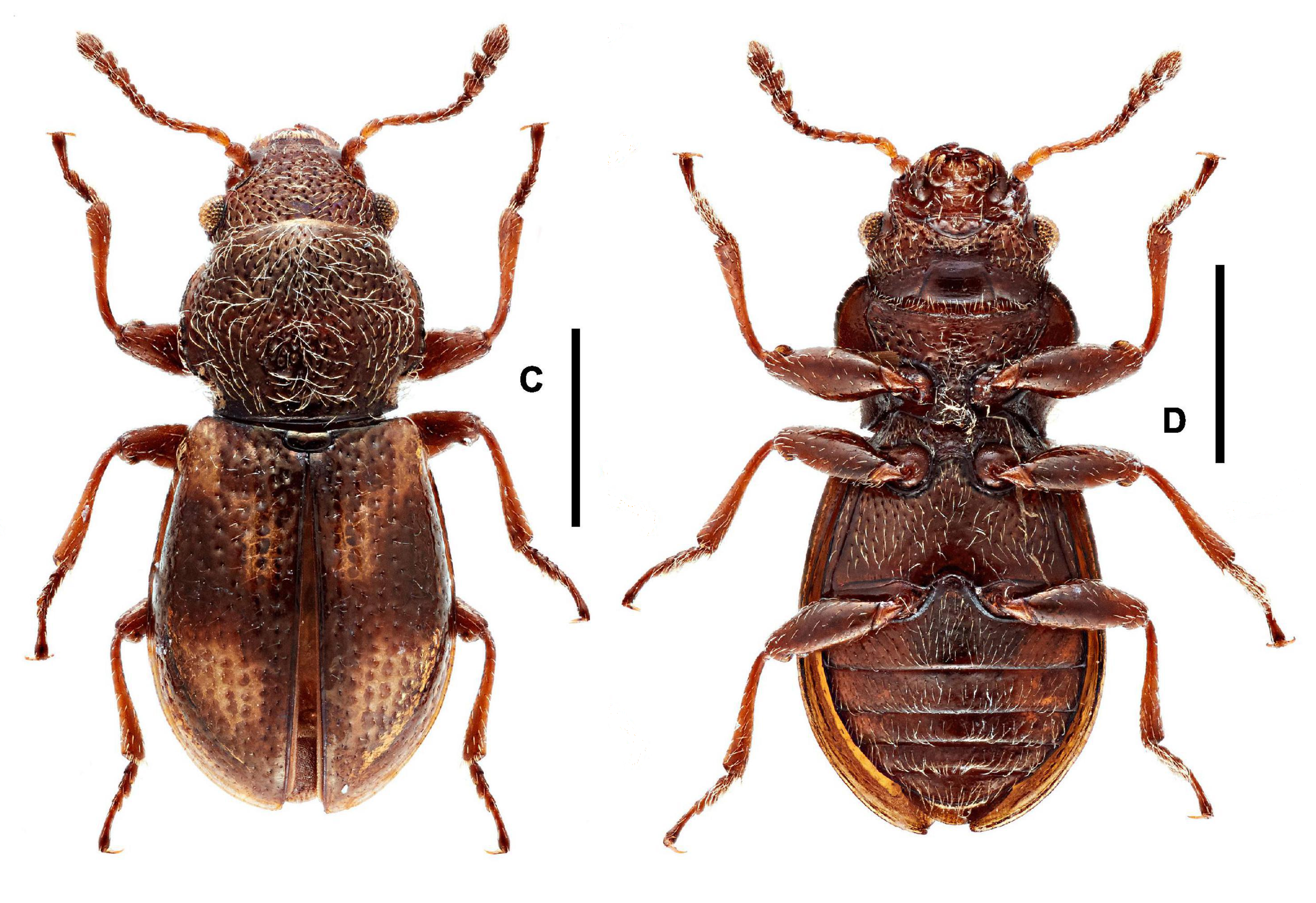
- Tasmosalpingus quadrispilotus

Scientific classification
- Kingdom: Animalia
- Phylum: Arthropoda
- Clade: Pancrustacea
- Class: Insecta
- Order: Coleoptera
- Suborder: Polyphaga
- Infraorder: Cucujiformia
- Superfamily: Cucujoidea
- Family: Tasmosalpingidae; Lawrence and Britton, 1991
- Genus: Tasmosalpingus; Lea, 1919

= Tasmosalpingus =

Genus of beetles

Tasmosalpingus is the only genus in the beetle family Tasmosalpingidae (superfamily Cucujoidea). There are two species in Tasmosalpingus, found in Australia in Tasmania, Victoria and New South Wales. Adults have been collected using malaise traps, while a possible larval specimen was found under the bark of the podocarp Phyllocladus aspleniifolius. Gut contents indicate that they are mycophagous, feeding on fungal hyphae.

== Species ==
These species belong to the genus Tasmosalpingus:

- Tasmosalpingus quadrispilotus Lea, 1919 (syn Tasmosalpingus promiscuus Lea, 1919)
- Tasmosalpingus magnus Liu, Porch & Ślipiński, 2023
