= Magnocoleus =

Magnocoleus Temporal range: Hauterivian–Barremian

Scientific classification
- Kingdom: Animalia
- Phylum: Arthropoda
- Class: Insecta
- Order: Coleoptera
- Suborder: Archostemata
- Family: †Magnocoleidae; Hong, 1998
- Genus: †Magnocoleus; Hong, 1998
- Species: †M. huangjiapuensis

Binomial name
- †Magnocoleus huangjiapuensis Hong, 1998

Family of beetles

Magnocoleus is an extinct genus of beetles from the Early Cretaceous of China, between 130.0 and 125.45 Mya. The genus contains a single species, Magnocoleus huangjiapuensis, and is the only member of the family Magnocoleidae in the suborder Archostemata. Magnocoleus was first described by Chinese palaeoentomologist Hong Youchong in 1998, based on fossils of isolated elytra from the Qingshila Formation in Huangjiapu, near the Nantianmen village of Zhangjiakou in Hebei. Recent phylogenetic analyses have suggested that Magnocoleus is closely related to or placed within either Cupedidae or Ommatidae.
