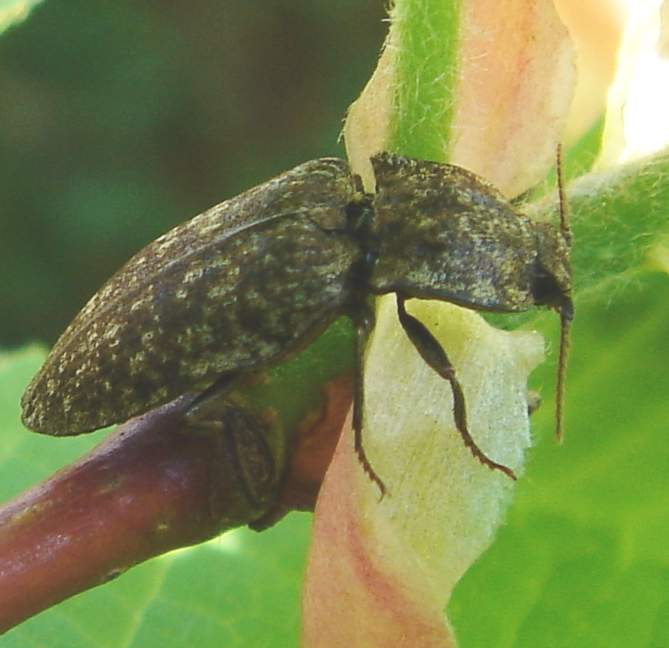
- Agrypnus murinus, a click beetle

Scientific classification
- Kingdom: Animalia
- Phylum: Arthropoda
- Clade: Pancrustacea
- Class: Insecta
- Order: Coleoptera
- Suborder: Polyphaga
- Infraorder: Elateriformia; Crowson, 1960

Superfamilies
- See text.

= Elateriformia =

Infraorder of beetles

Elateriformia is an infraorder of polyphagan beetles. The two largest families in this group are buprestids, of which there are around 15,000 described species, and click beetles, of which there are around 10,000 described species.

The infraorder consists of six superfamilies:

- Buprestoidea — the metallic wood-boring beetles
- Byrrhoidea — families including long-toed water beetles, moss beetles and mud-loving beetles
- Dascilloidea
- Elateroidea — including the click beetles and soldier beetles
- Rhinorhipoidea
- Scirtoidea

== See also ==
- List of subgroups of the order Coleoptera
