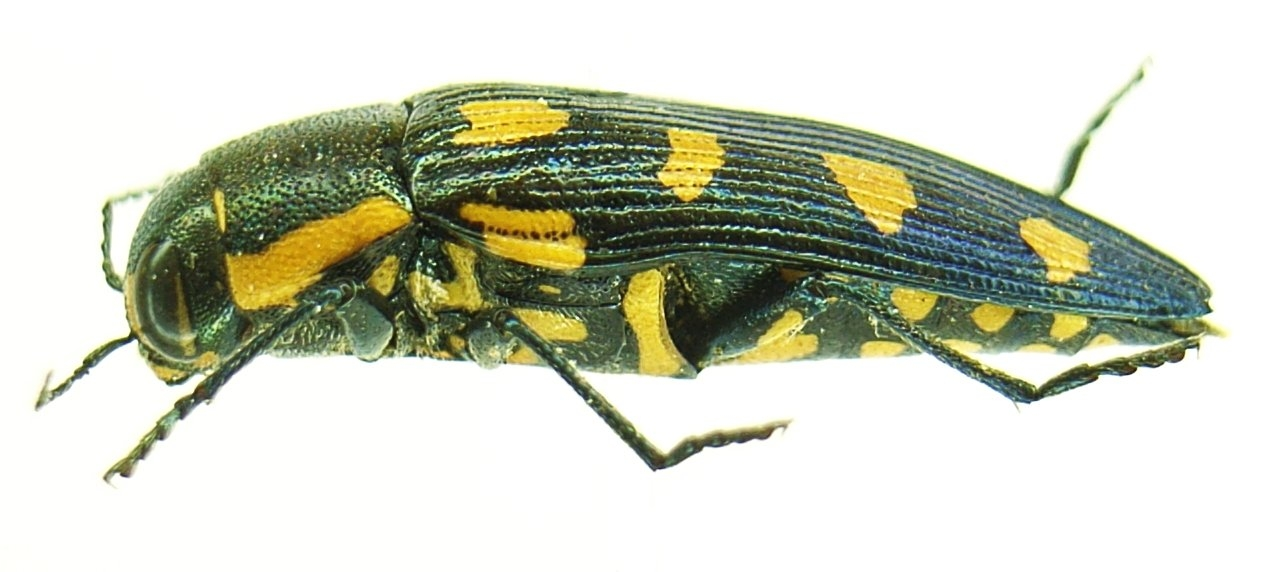
- Buprestis octoguttata

Scientific classification
- Kingdom: Animalia
- Phylum: Arthropoda
- Clade: Pancrustacea
- Class: Insecta
- Order: Coleoptera
- Suborder: Polyphaga
- Infraorder: Elateriformia
- Superfamily: Buprestoidea; Leach, 1815

= Buprestoidea =

Superfamily of beetles

Buprestoidea is a superfamily of beetles.

It contains two families:

- Buprestidae Leach 1815, the jewel beetles or metallic wood-boring beetles.
- Schizopodidae LeConte 1861
