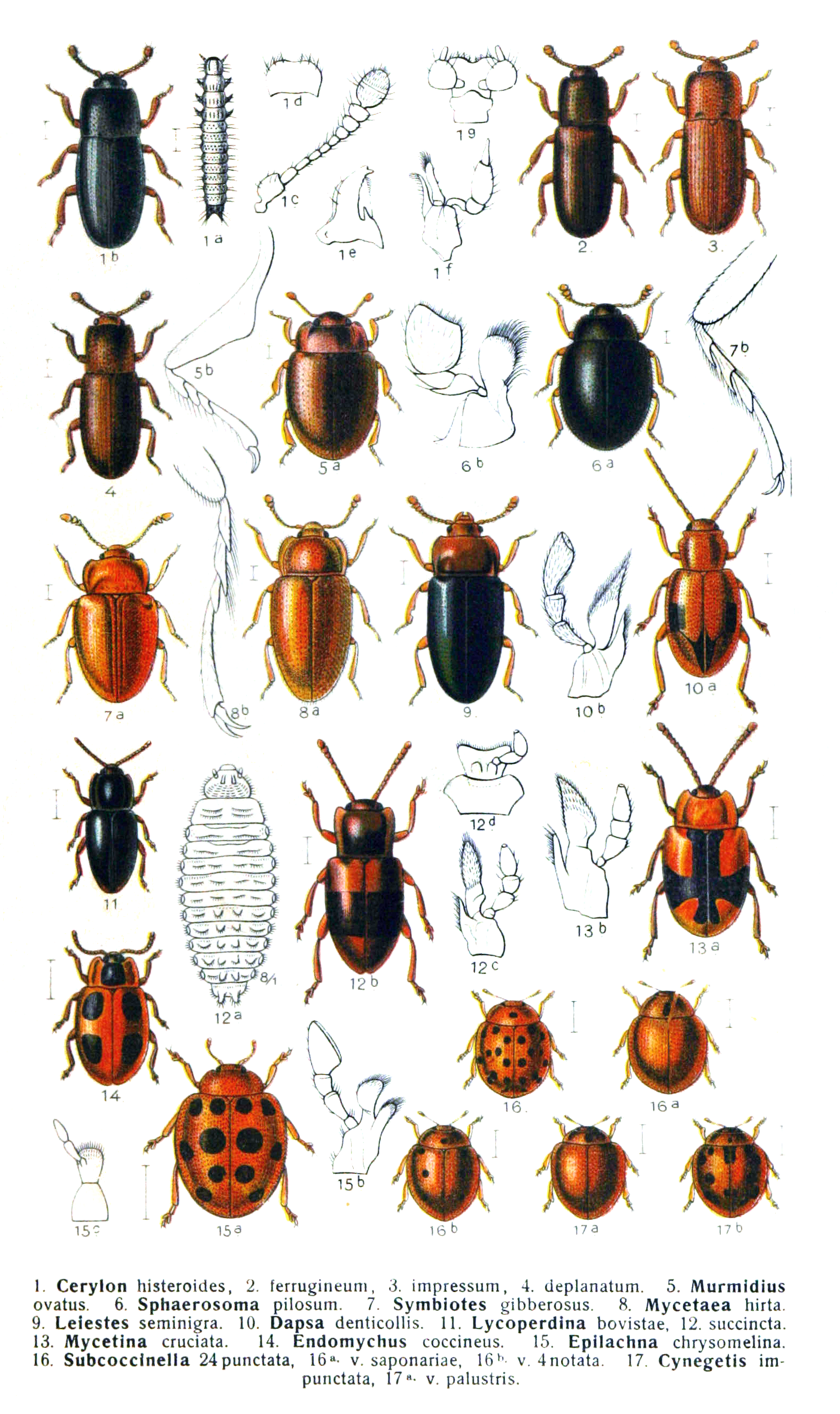
- Various Cucujoidea with larvae and anatomical details

Scientific classification
- Domain: Eukaryota
- Kingdom: Animalia
- Phylum: Arthropoda
- Class: Insecta
- Order: Coleoptera
- Suborder: Polyphaga
- Infraorder: Cucujiformia
- Superfamily: Cucujoidea; Latreille, 1802

= Cucujoidea =

Cucujoidea Temporal range: Jurassic–Recent

Superfamily of beetles

Cucujoidea is a superfamily of beetles. This group formerly included all of the families now included in the superfamily Coccinelloidea. They include some fungus beetles and a diversity of lineages of "bark beetles" unrelated to the "true" bark beetles (Scolytinae), which are weevils (superfamily Curculionoidea).

== Morphology ==
The morphology of Cucujoidea is varied and there are no features uniting all members of the superfamily. In terms of general appearance, they tend to be small, drab in colour and with clubbed antennae. Even this is not universal; for example, Glischrochilus (Nitidulidae) have aposematic orange spots on their elytra.

Adults can be recognised by the procoxal cavities being internally open in most taxa, females having tarsal formula 5-5-5 and males 5-5-5 or 5-5-4 (rarely 4-4-4), females with tergite VIII concealed dorsally by tergite VII, and males with tergite X completely membraneous.

Larvae have frontal arms usually lyriform, the mandible mesal surface usually with well-developed mola, a maxillary articulating area usually present, a hypopharyngeal sclerome usually present, and two pretarsal setae.

== Ecology ==
Cucujoidea usually have cryptic habits, living in fungi, leaf litter or dead wood. This is reflected in many families having "fungus" or "bark" in their common names. The Kateretidae and some Phalacridae feed on flowers instead. The Nitidulidae are quite varied: some are saprophagous and mycetophagous like typical cucujoids, but others are associated with carrion, flowers, insect nests or stored food products.

== Taxonomy ==
According to a 2015 revision, the following 25 families make up superfamily Cucujoidea:

- Agapythidae Sen Gupta and Crowson, 1969
- Boganiidae Sen Gupta & Crowson, 1966
- Cavognathidae Sen Gupta & Crowson, 1966
- Cryptophagidae Kirby, 1826 – silken fungus beetles
- Cucujidae Latreille, 1802 – flat bark beetles
- Cybocephalidae Jacquelin du Val, 1858
- Cyclaxyridae Gimmel, Leschen & Ślipiński, 2009 – sooty mould beetles
- Erotylidae Latreille, 1802 – pleasing fungus beetles
- Helotidae Reitter, 1876
- Hobartiidae Sen Gupta & Crowson, 1966
- Kateretidae Erichson in Agassiz, 1846 – short-winged flower beetles (= Brachypteridae)
- Laemophloeidae Ganglbauer 1899 – lined flat bark beetles
- Lamingtoniidae Sen Gupta & Crowson, 1966
- Monotomidae Laporte, 1840 – root-eating beetles
- Myraboliidae Lawrence and Britton, 1991
- Nitidulidae Latreille, 1802 – sap beetles
- Passandridae Erichson, 1845 – parasitic flat bark beetles
- Phalacridae Leach, 1815 – shining flower beetles
- Phloeostichidae Reitter, 1911
- Priasilphidae Crowson, 1973
- Protocucujidae Crowson, 1954
- Silvanidae Kirby, 1937 – silvanid flat bark beetles
- Smicripidae Horn, 1879 – palmetto beetles
- Sphindidae Jacquelin du Val, 1860 – dry-fungus beetles
- Tasmosalpingidae Lawrence and Britton, 1991
- †Parandrexidae Kirejtshuk, 1994 (Middle Jurassic-Early Cretaceous)
- †Wabbelidae Alekseev, 2017 (Eocene)

=== Extinct genera ===
- †Alloterocucus Li et al., 2022 Burmese amber, Myanmar, mid-Cretaceous (latest Albian- earliest Cenomanian)
