= Roy Crowson =

British entomologist (1914–1999)

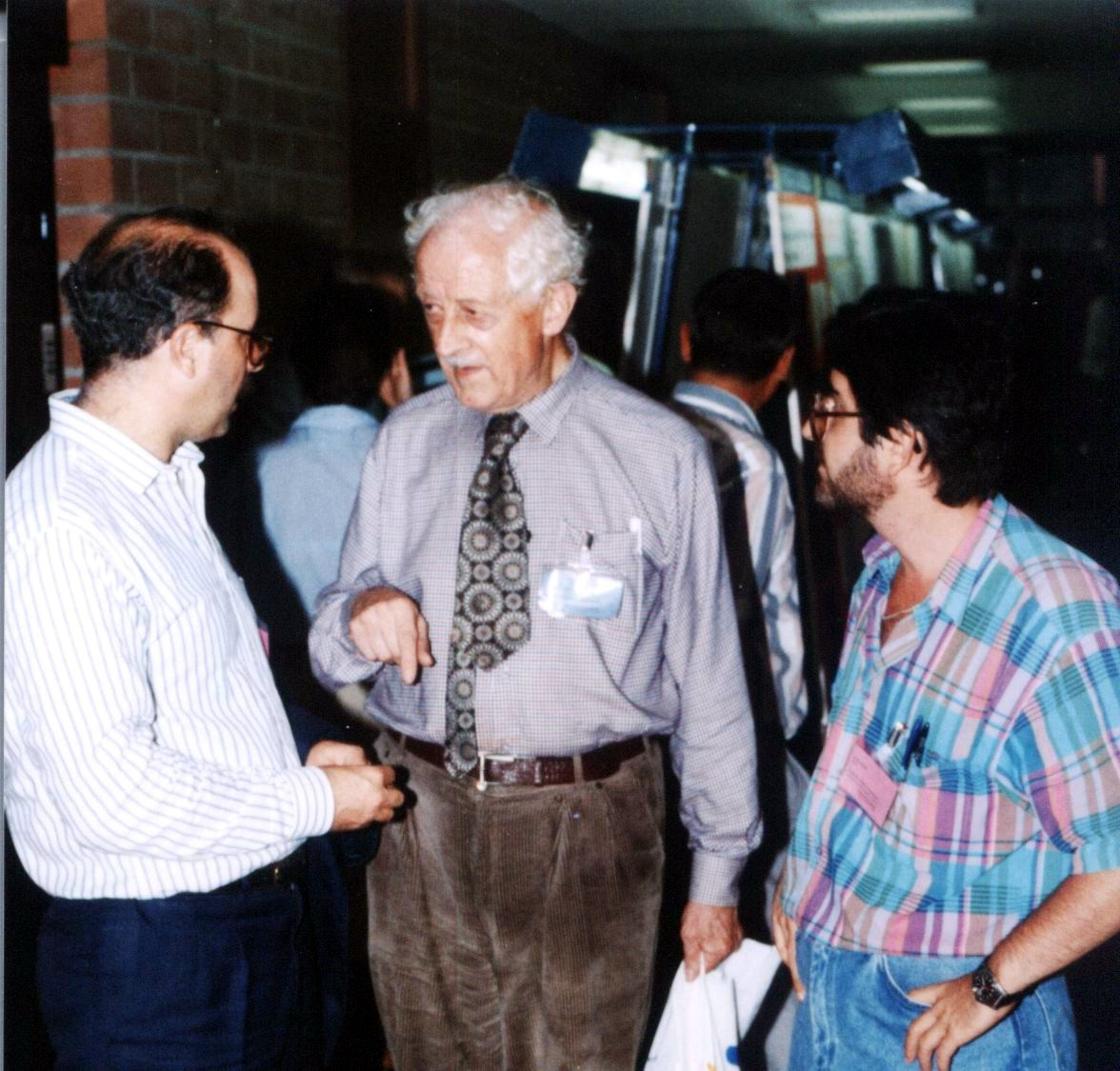
R. Crowson (center) with two colleagues at the International Congress of Coleopterology of Barcelona, September 1989

Roy Albert Crowson (22 November 1914 in Hadlow, Kent – 13 May 1999) was an English biologist who specialised in the taxonomy of beetles. He was curator at the Tunbridge Wells Museum, and then lectured at the Zoology Department of the University of Glasgow. The beetle genus Crowsoniella is named in his honour.

== Life ==
Crowson was born on 22 November in Hadlow, Kent. He was educated at the Judd School, in Tonbridge and then at Imperial College, London University where he completed his Ph.D. in 1937. Crowson served in the Royal Air Force during the war, and was the Assistant Curator of the Tunbridge Wells Museum from 1938.

Crowson moved from the Tunbridge Wells Museum to the Zoology Department of the University of Glasgow from 1949, where he was appointed as a lecturer. He collected beetles and their larvae from around the world and studied the relationships between them. His 1955 monograph, The natural classification of the families of Coleoptera, established a system for the classification of beetles that remains in use.

His collections of British Coleoptera are in the Hunterian Museum, Glasgow, and his collections of world families, including large quantities of microscope slides and dissections, in the Natural History Museum, London. Crowson collected abroad in the Central Apennines, Italy, and in Australia and New Zealand, after gaining a Leverhulme Trust fellowship. Some of his collected specimens are in Te Papa, the national museum of New Zealand.

A festschrift honouring Crowson was given in 1995. The beetle genus Crowsoniella is named in his honour.

Crowson died on 13 May 1999.

== Family ==
Crowson worked closely with his wife, Elizabeth Anne Crowson (1928–2006), who was also a respected naturalist as well as a university lecturer in botany. They frequently collected and published papers together.

== Works ==
- The natural classification of the families of Coleoptera, Nathaniel Lloyd & Co., Ltd., London, 1955.
- Coleoptera: introduction and key to families, Handbooks for the identification of British insects, Royal Entomological Society of London, London, 1957. pdf
- Classification and biology, Heinemann Educational Books Ltd, London, 1970.
- Biology of the Coleptera, Academic Press, 1981.
