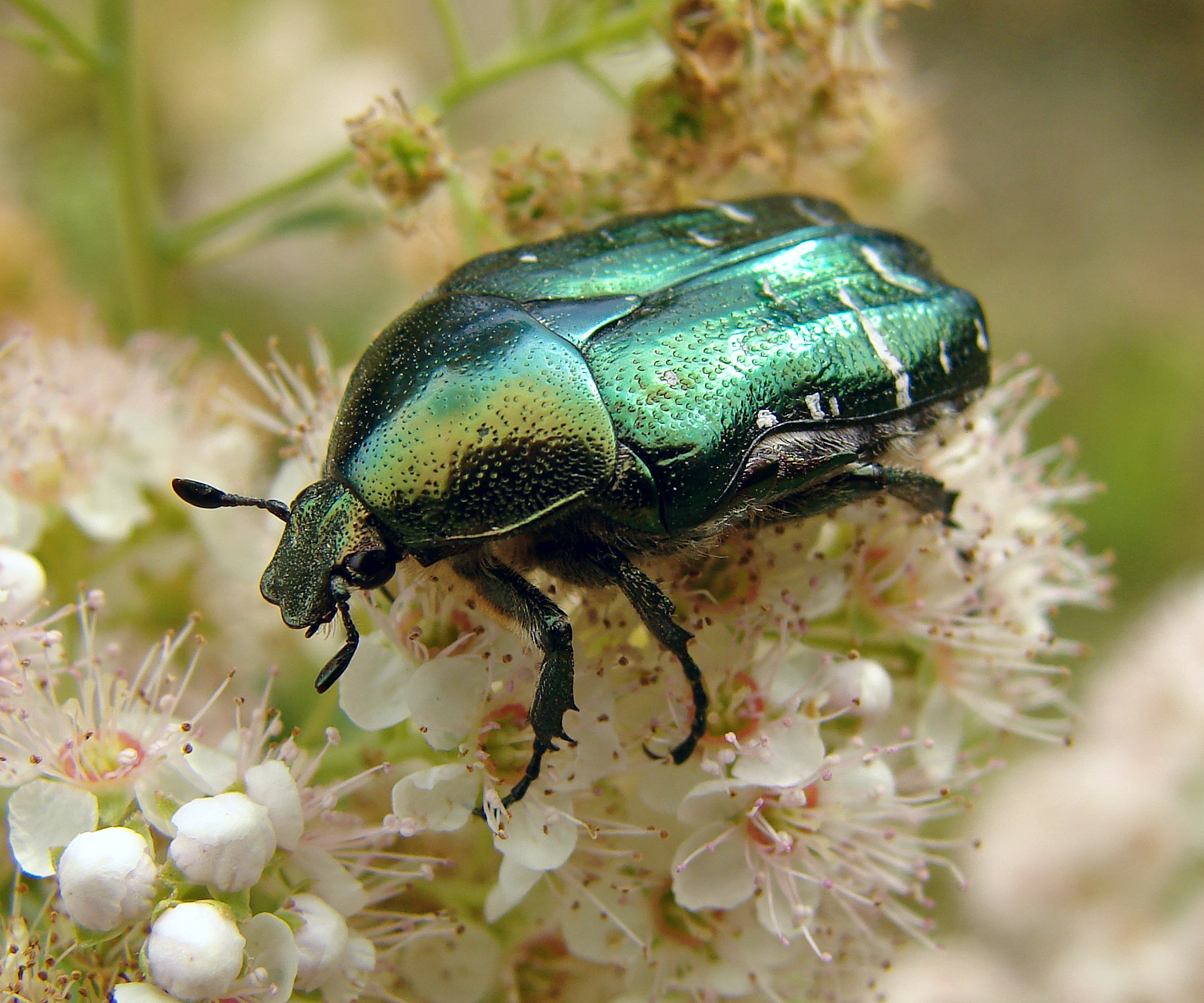
- Cetonia aurata

Scientific classification
- Kingdom: Animalia
- Phylum: Arthropoda
- Clade: Pancrustacea
- Class: Insecta
- Order: Coleoptera
- Suborder: Polyphaga; Emery, 1886

Infraorders
- Bostrichiformia; Cucujiformia; Elateriformia; Scarabaeiformia; Staphyliniformia

= Polyphaga =

Polyphaga Temporal range: Triassic–Present

Suborder of beetles

Polyphaga is the largest and most diverse suborder of beetles. It comprises 144 families in 16 superfamilies, and displays an enormous variety of specialization and adaptation, with over 350,000 described species, or approximately 90% of the beetle species discovered thus far.

Key characteristics of Polyphaga are that the hind coxa (base of the leg) does not divide the first and second abdominal/ventral plates which are known as sternites. Also, the notopleural suture (found under the pronotal shield) is not present.

== Etymology ==
The name of polyphaga is derived from two Greek words: poly-, meaning 'many', and phagein, meaning 'to eat', so the suborder is called the "eaters of many things".

== Classification ==
The five main infraorders are:

- Bostrichiformia – including furniture beetles and skin beetles
- Cucujiformia – includes lady beetles, longhorn beetles, weevils, checkered beetles and leaf beetles
- Elateriformia – includes click beetles and fireflies
- Scarabaeiformia – includes scarab beetles, stag beetles, and dung beetles
- Staphyliniformia – includes rove beetles and water scavenger beetles

Phylogenetic studies have also suggested that Scirtoidea (Scirtidae, Decliniidae), Clamboidea (Clambidae, Derodontidae, Eucinetidae), Rhinorhipus and Nosodendridae are independent lineages of Polyphaga that lie outside these groups.

The internal classification of Polyphaga involves several superfamilies or series, whose constituents are relatively stable, although some smaller families (whose rank even is disputed) are allocated to different clades by different authors. Large superfamilies include Hydrophiloidea, Staphylinoidea, Scarabaeoidea, Buprestoidea, Byrrhoidea, Elateroidea, and Bostrichoidea.

The infraorder Cucujiformia includes the vast majority of phytophagous (plant-eating) beetles, united by cryptonephric Malpighian tubules of the normal type, a cone ommatidium with open rhabdom, and lack of functional spiracles on the eighth abdominal segment. Constituent superfamilies of Cucujiformia are Cleroidea, Cucujoidea, Tenebrionoidea, Chrysomeloidea, and Curculionoidea. Evidently adoption of a phytophagous lifestyle correlates with taxon diversity in beetles, with Cucujiformia, especially weevils (Curculionoidea), forming a major radiation.

== See also ==
- List of subgroups of the order Coleoptera
