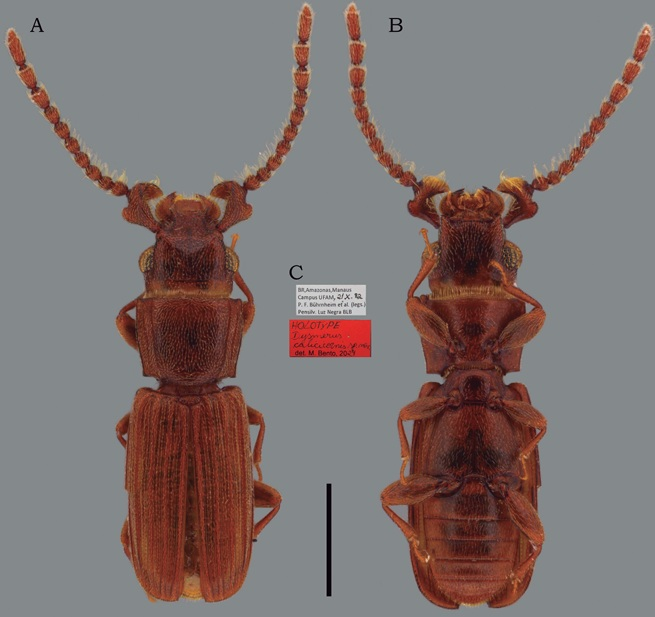

Scientific classification
- Domain: Eukaryota
- Kingdom: Animalia
- Phylum: Arthropoda
- Class: Insecta
- Order: Coleoptera
- Suborder: Polyphaga
- Infraorder: Cucujiformia
- Family: Laemophloeidae
- Genus: Dysmerus
- Species: D. calicicornis

Binomial name
- Dysmerus calicicornis Bento, 2025

= Dysmerus calicicornis =

Species of beetle

Dysmerus calicicornis is a species of beetle of the Laemophloeidae family. This species is found in Brazil (Manaus).

2.0–2.2 mm. They are uniformly reddish brown, with the elytra lighter.

== Etymology ==
The specific epithet derives from Latin calyx (meaning chalice) and cornis (meaning horn, antenna) and refers to the male antennal scape, which is caliciform in dorsal view.
