= Lathropus vernalis =

Scientific classification
- Kingdom: Animalia
- Phylum: Arthropoda
- Class: Insecta
- Order: Coleoptera
- Suborder: Polyphaga
- Infraorder: Cucujiformia
- Family: Laemophloeidae
- Genus: Lathropus
- Species: L. vernalis

Binomial name
- Lathropus vernalis LeConte, 1869

Species of beetle

Lathropus vernalis is a species of lined flat bark beetle in the family Laemophloeidae. It is found in North America.
