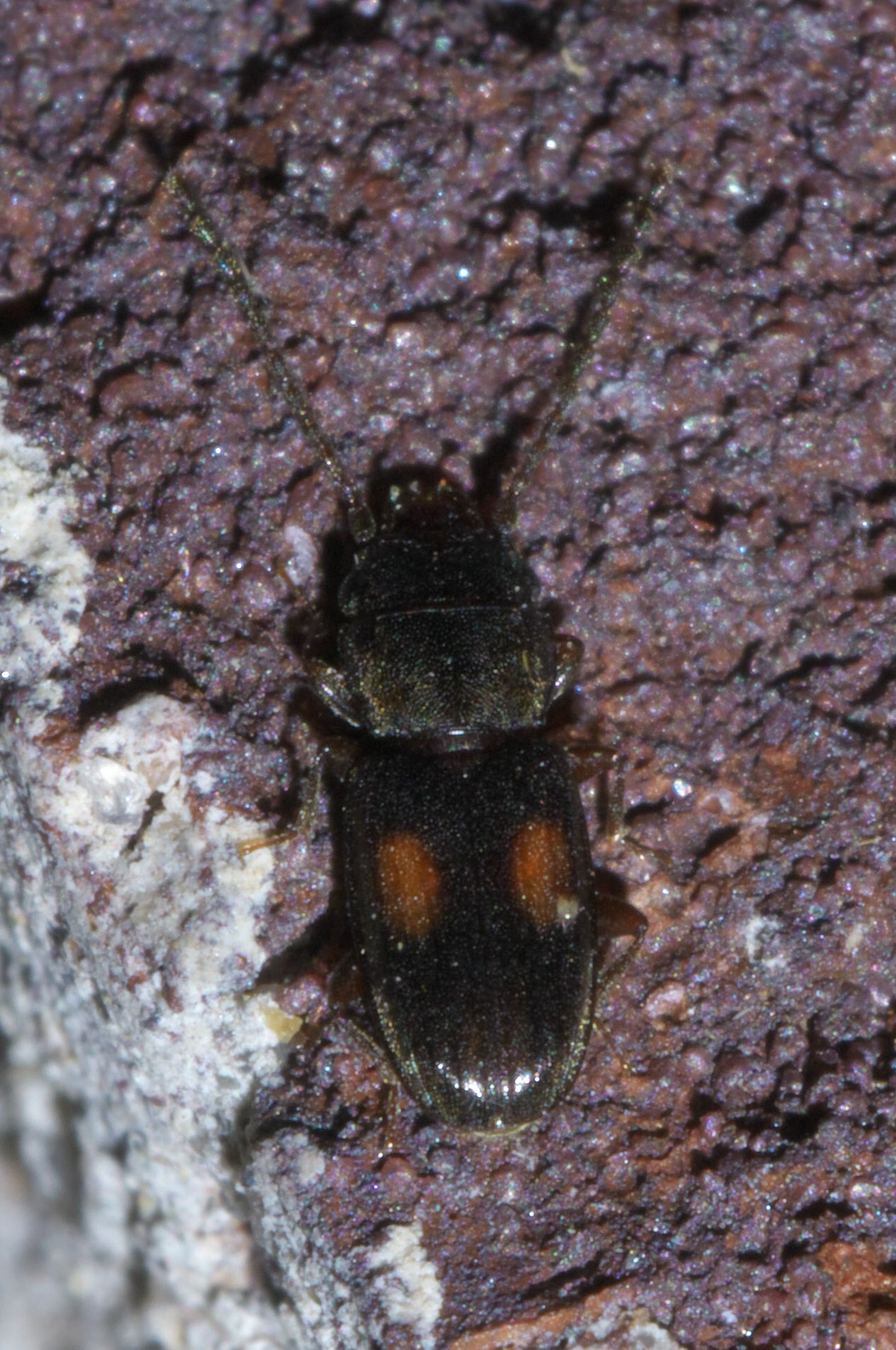

Scientific classification
- Kingdom: Animalia
- Phylum: Arthropoda
- Class: Insecta
- Order: Coleoptera
- Suborder: Polyphaga
- Infraorder: Cucujiformia
- Family: Laemophloeidae
- Genus: Laemophloeus
- Species: L. biguttatus

Binomial name
- Laemophloeus biguttatus (Say, 1827)

Synonyms
- Cucujus biguttatus Say, 1827; Laemophloeus bisignatus Guérin-Méneville, 1844

= Laemophloeus biguttatus =

Species of beetle

Laemophloeus biguttatus is a species of lined flat bark beetle in the family Laemophloeidae. It is found in Central America and North America.

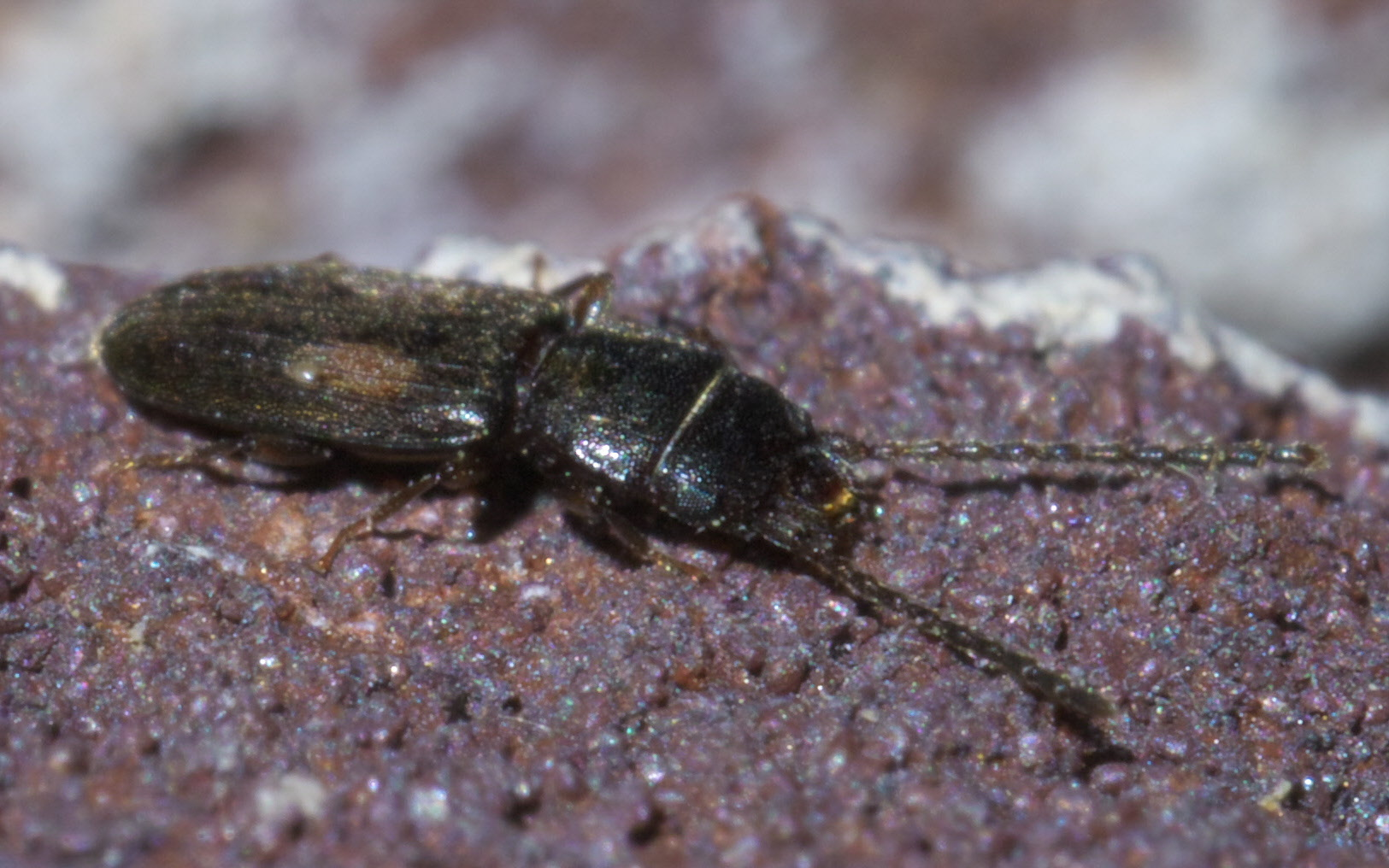
