= Lathropus pubescens =

Scientific classification
- Kingdom: Animalia
- Phylum: Arthropoda
- Class: Insecta
- Order: Coleoptera
- Suborder: Polyphaga
- Infraorder: Cucujiformia
- Family: Laemophloeidae
- Genus: Lathropus
- Species: L. pubescens

Binomial name
- Lathropus pubescens Casey, 1884

Species of beetle

Lathropus pubescens is a species of lined flat bark beetles in the family Laemophloeidae. It is found in North America.
