= Laemophloeus megacephalus =

Scientific classification
- Kingdom: Animalia
- Phylum: Arthropoda
- Class: Insecta
- Order: Coleoptera
- Suborder: Polyphaga
- Infraorder: Cucujiformia
- Family: Laemophloeidae
- Genus: Laemophloeus
- Species: L. megacephalus

Binomial name
- Laemophloeus megacephalus Grouvelle, 1876

Synonyms
- Laemophloeus floridanus Casey, 1884

Species of beetle

Laemophloeus megacephalus is a species of lined flat bark beetle in the family Laemophloeidae. It is found in the Caribbean, Central America, and North America.
