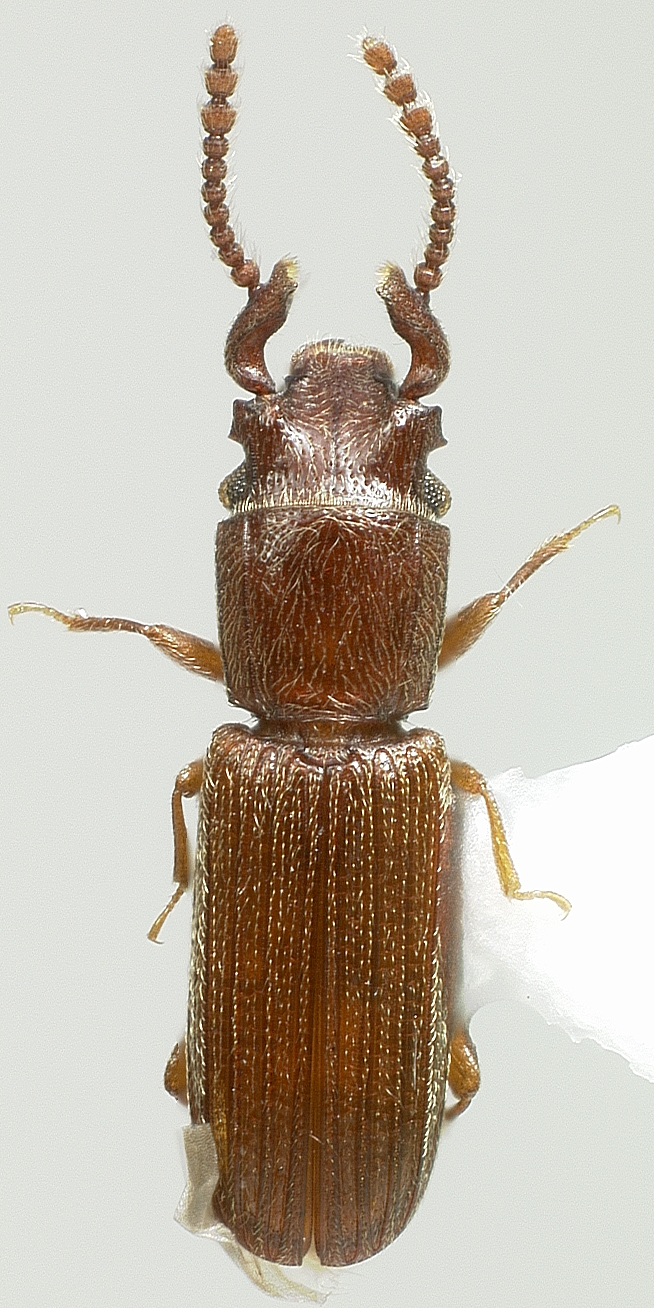

Scientific classification
- Kingdom: Animalia
- Phylum: Arthropoda
- Class: Insecta
- Order: Coleoptera
- Suborder: Polyphaga
- Infraorder: Cucujiformia
- Family: Laemophloeidae
- Genus: Dysmerus
- Species: D. basalis

Binomial name
- Dysmerus basalis Casey, 1884

= Dysmerus basalis =

Species of beetle

Dysmerus basalis is a species of lined flat bark beetle in the family Laemophloeidae. It is found in North America.
