= Charaphloeus flavosignatus =

Scientific classification
- Domain: Eukaryota
- Kingdom: Animalia
- Phylum: Arthropoda
- Class: Insecta
- Order: Coleoptera
- Suborder: Polyphaga
- Infraorder: Cucujiformia
- Family: Laemophloeidae
- Genus: Charaphloeus
- Species: C. flavosignatus

Binomial name
- Charaphloeus flavosignatus (Schäffer, 1910)

Synonyms
- Laemophloeus flavosignatus Schäffer, 1910

Species of beetle

Charaphloeus flavosignatus is a species of lined flat bark beetle in the family Laemophloeidae. It is found in North America.
