= Charaphloeus convexulus =

Scientific classification
- Kingdom: Animalia
- Phylum: Arthropoda
- Class: Insecta
- Order: Coleoptera
- Suborder: Polyphaga
- Infraorder: Cucujiformia
- Family: Laemophloeidae
- Genus: Charaphloeus
- Species: C. convexulus

Binomial name
- Charaphloeus convexulus (LeConte, 1879)

Synonyms
- Charaphloeus filiger Casey, 1916; Charaphloeus sphaerops Casey, 1916; Laemophloeus convexulus LeConte, 1879; Laemophloeus filiger (Casey, 1916); Laemophloeus sphaerops (Casey, 1916)

Species of beetle

Charaphloeus convexulus is a species of lined flat bark beetle in the family Laemophloeidae. It is found in North America.
