= Charaphloeus adustus =

Scientific classification
- Domain: Eukaryota
- Kingdom: Animalia
- Phylum: Arthropoda
- Class: Insecta
- Order: Coleoptera
- Suborder: Polyphaga
- Infraorder: Cucujiformia
- Family: Laemophloeidae
- Genus: Charaphloeus
- Species: C. adustus

Binomial name
- Charaphloeus adustus (LeConte, 1854)

Synonyms
- Charaphloeus fraterculus Casey, 1916; Laemophloeus adustus LeConte, 1854

Species of beetle

Charaphloeus adustus is a species of lined flat bark beetle in the family Laemophloeidae. It is found in North America.
