= Phloeolaemus chamaeropis =

Scientific classification
- Kingdom: Animalia
- Phylum: Arthropoda
- Class: Insecta
- Order: Coleoptera
- Suborder: Polyphaga
- Infraorder: Cucujiformia
- Family: Laemophloeidae
- Genus: Phloeolaemus
- Species: P. chamaeropis

Binomial name
- Phloeolaemus chamaeropis (Schwarz, 1878)

Synonyms
- Laemophloeus chamaeropis Schwarz, 1878

Species of beetle

Phloeolaemus chamaeropis is a species of lined flat bark beetle in the family Laemophloeidae. It is found in North America.
