= Parandrita cephalotes =

Scientific classification
- Kingdom: Animalia
- Phylum: Arthropoda
- Class: Insecta
- Order: Coleoptera
- Suborder: Polyphaga
- Infraorder: Cucujiformia
- Family: Laemophloeidae
- Genus: Parandrita
- Species: P. cephalotes

Binomial name
- Parandrita cephalotes (LeConte, 1854)

Synonyms
- Laemophloeus cephalotes LeConte, 1854

Species of beetle

Parandrita cephalotes is a species of lined flat bark beetle in the family Laemophloeidae. It is found in North America.
