= Narthecius grandiceps =

Scientific classification
- Kingdom: Animalia
- Phylum: Arthropoda
- Class: Insecta
- Order: Coleoptera
- Suborder: Polyphaga
- Infraorder: Cucujiformia
- Family: Laemophloeidae
- Genus: Narthecius
- Species: N. grandiceps

Binomial name
- Narthecius grandiceps LeConte, 1863

Synonyms
- Narthecius breviceps Casey, 1890

Species of beetle

Narthecius grandiceps is a species of lined flat bark beetle in the family Laemophloeidae. It is found in North America.
