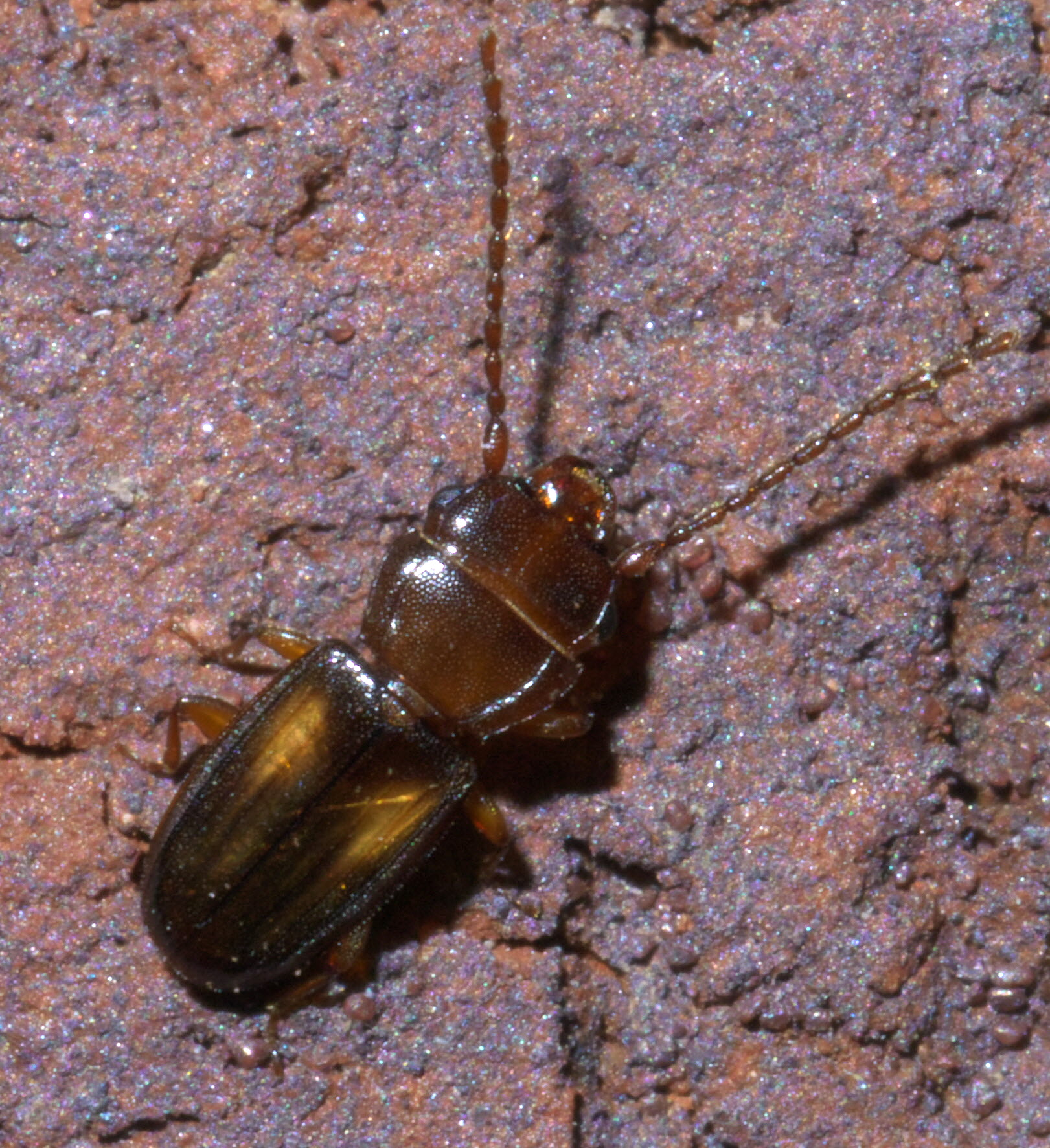

Scientific classification
- Kingdom: Animalia
- Phylum: Arthropoda
- Class: Insecta
- Order: Coleoptera
- Suborder: Polyphaga
- Infraorder: Cucujiformia
- Family: Laemophloeidae
- Genus: Laemophloeus
- Species: L. fervidus

Binomial name
- Laemophloeus fervidus Casey, 1916

= Laemophloeus fervidus =

Species of beetle

Laemophloeus fervidus is a species of lined flat bark beetle in the family Laemophloeidae. It is found in North America.
