= Rhabdophloeus horni =

Scientific classification
- Kingdom: Animalia
- Phylum: Arthropoda
- Class: Insecta
- Order: Coleoptera
- Suborder: Polyphaga
- Infraorder: Cucujiformia
- Family: Laemophloeidae
- Genus: Rhabdophloeus
- Species: R. horni

Binomial name
- Rhabdophloeus horni (Casey, 1884)

Synonyms
- Laemophloeus horni Casey, 1884

Species of beetle

Rhabdophloeus horni is a species of lined flat bark beetle in the family Laemophloeidae. It is found in North America.
