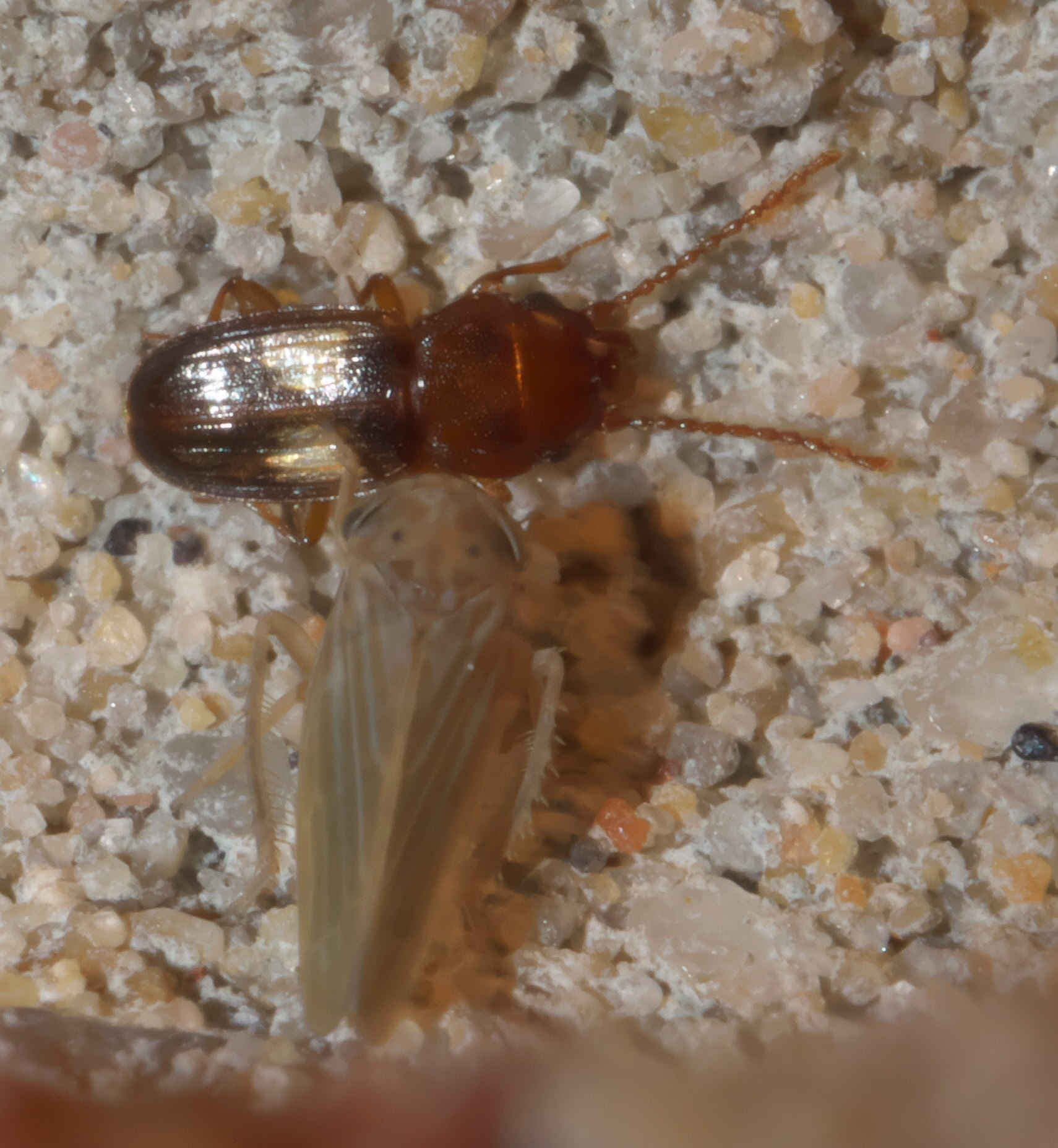

Scientific classification
- Kingdom: Animalia
- Phylum: Arthropoda
- Class: Insecta
- Order: Coleoptera
- Suborder: Polyphaga
- Infraorder: Cucujiformia
- Family: Laemophloeidae
- Genus: Laemophloeus
- Species: L. fasciatus

Binomial name
- Laemophloeus fasciatus Melsheimer, 1846

= Laemophloeus fasciatus =

Species of beetle

Laemophloeus fasciatus is a species of lined flat bark beetle in the family Laemophloeidae. It is found in North America.

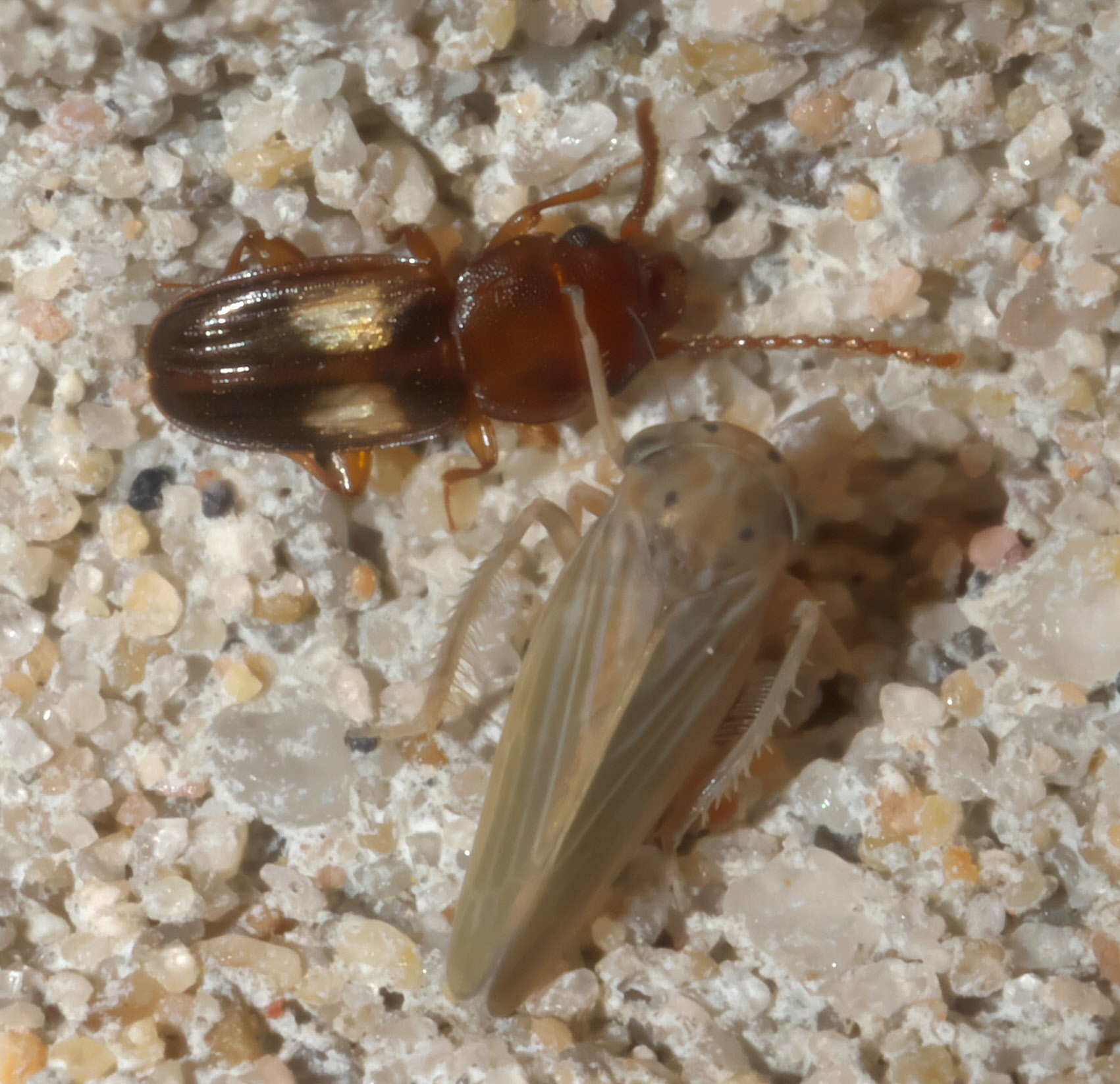
