= Lathropus robustulus =

Scientific classification
- Kingdom: Animalia
- Phylum: Arthropoda
- Class: Insecta
- Order: Coleoptera
- Suborder: Polyphaga
- Infraorder: Cucujiformia
- Family: Laemophloeidae
- Genus: Lathropus
- Species: L. robustulus

Binomial name
- Lathropus robustulus Casey, 1916

Species of beetle

Lathropus robustulus is a species of lined flat bark beetle in the family Laemophloeidae. It is found in North America.
