= Cucujinus coquereli =

Scientific classification
- Domain: Eukaryota
- Kingdom: Animalia
- Phylum: Arthropoda
- Class: Insecta
- Order: Coleoptera
- Suborder: Polyphaga
- Infraorder: Cucujiformia
- Superfamily: Cucujoidea
- Family: Laemophloeidae
- Genus: Cucujinus
- Species: C. coquereli

Binomial name
- Cucujinus coquereli Grouvelle, 1899

Species of beetle

Cucujinus coquereli is a beetle species in the family Laemophloeidae found on Reunion Island off the coast of Madagascar. The scientific name of the species was first described by Grouvelle in 1899.
