= Planolestes =

Scientific classification
- Kingdom: Animalia
- Phylum: Arthropoda
- Class: Insecta
- Order: Coleoptera
- Suborder: Polyphaga
- Infraorder: Cucujiformia
- Family: Laemophloeidae
- Genus: Planolestes; Lefkovitch, 1958

Genus of beetles

Planolestes is a genus of beetles in the family Laemophloeidae, containing the following species:

- Planolestes brunneus Grouvelle
- Planolestes laevicornis Lefkovitch
