= Microbrontes =

Scientific classification
- Kingdom: Animalia
- Phylum: Arthropoda
- Class: Insecta
- Order: Coleoptera
- Suborder: Polyphaga
- Infraorder: Cucujiformia
- Superfamily: Cucujoidea
- Family: Laemophloeidae
- Genus: Microbrontes; Reitter, 1874

Synonyms
- Tularthrum Broun, 1893

Genus of beetles

Microbrontes is a genus of beetles in the family Laemophloeidae, containing the following species:

- Microbrontes blackburni (Grouvelle, 1902) Lefkovitch 1958
- Microbrontes laemophloeoides Reitter, 1874
- Microbrontes lineatus (Broun, 1893) Lefkovitch 1958

The genus Tularthrum became classified as a junior synonym in 1958.
