= Caulonomus =

Caulonomus rhizophagoides

Scientific classification
- Kingdom: Animalia
- Phylum: Arthropoda
- Class: Insecta
- Order: Coleoptera
- Suborder: Polyphaga
- Infraorder: Cucujiformia
- Family: Laemophloeidae
- Genus: Caulonomus; Wollaston, 1862
- Species: C. rhizophagoides

Binomial name
- Caulonomus rhizophagoides Wollaston, 1862

Genus of beetles

Caulonomus rhizophagoides is a species of beetles in the family Laemophloeidae, the only species in the genus Caulonomus.
