= Xylophloeus =

Scientific classification
- Kingdom: Animalia
- Phylum: Arthropoda
- Class: Insecta
- Order: Coleoptera
- Suborder: Polyphaga
- Infraorder: Cucujiformia
- Family: Laemophloeidae
- Genus: Xylophloeus; Lefkovitch, 1962

Genus of beetles

Xylophloeus is a genus of beetles in the family Laemophloeidae, containing the following species:

- Xylophloeus bimaculatus Lefkovitch
- Xylophloeus chrysomeloides Lefkovitch
- Xylophloeus darjeelingensis Mukhopadhyay & Sen Gupta
- Xylophloeus dentatus Lefkovitch
- Xylophloeus elgonensis Lefkovitch
- Xylophloeus integer Grouvelle
- Xylophloeus mimosae Lefkovitch
- Xylophloeus nainitalensis Mukhopadhyay & Sen Gupta
- Xylophloeus patens Grouvelle
- Xylophloeus unifasciatus Lefkovitch
