= Microlaemus =

Scientific classification
- Kingdom: Animalia
- Phylum: Arthropoda
- Class: Insecta
- Order: Coleoptera
- Suborder: Polyphaga
- Infraorder: Cucujiformia
- Superfamily: Cucujoidea
- Family: Laemophloeidae
- Genus: Microlaemus; Lefkovich, 1962

Genus of beetles

Microlaemus is a genus of beetles in the family Laemophloeidae, containing the following species:

- Microlaemus brightensis Blackburn
- Microlaemus ferrugineus Lefkovitch
- Microlaemus interceptus Grouvelle
- Microlaemus mirificus Grouvelle
- Microlaemus palpalis Waterhouse
- Microlaemus piceicollis Lea
- Microlaemus picipennis Grouvelle
- Microlaemus slades Lefkovitch
- Microlaemus strigiceps Lea
- Microlaemus sulcifrons Grouvelle
- Microlaemus sylvestris Grouvelle
- Microlaemus turneri Lefkovitch
