= Brontolaemus =

Scientific classification
- Kingdom: Animalia
- Phylum: Arthropoda
- Class: Insecta
- Order: Coleoptera
- Suborder: Polyphaga
- Infraorder: Cucujiformia
- Family: Laemophloeidae
- Genus: Brontolaemus; Sharp, 1885

Genus of beetles

Brontolaemus is a genus of beetles in the family Laemophloeidae that is found only in the Hawaiian Islands. The members of the genus are notable for their large size relative to most other laemophloeids, and their extremely long antennae that may be twice as long as the body.

== Species ==
These four species belong to the genus Brontolaemus:

- Brontolaemus agilis Sharp in Sharp & Scott, 1908
- Brontolaemus currax Sharp in Sharp & Scott, 1908
- Brontolaemus elegans Sharp, 1885
- Brontolaemus nudicornis Sharp in Sharp & Scott, 1908
