= Parandrita =

Scientific classification
- Kingdom: Animalia
- Phylum: Arthropoda
- Class: Insecta
- Order: Coleoptera
- Suborder: Polyphaga
- Infraorder: Cucujiformia
- Superfamily: Cucujoidea
- Family: Laemophloeidae
- Genus: Parandrita; J.LeConte & Horn, 1880

Genus of beetles

Parandrita is a genus of beetles in the family Laemophloeidae, containing the following species:

- Parandrita aenea Sharp
- Parandrita capito Grouvelle
- Parandrita cephalotes LeConte
- Parandrita deceptor Sharp
- Parandrita gracilis Sharp
- Parandrita konae Sharp
- Parandrita liturata Sharp
- Parandrita molokaiae Sharp
- Parandrita perkinsi Sharp
- Parandrita permixtus Grouvelle
- Parandrita stipes Sharp
