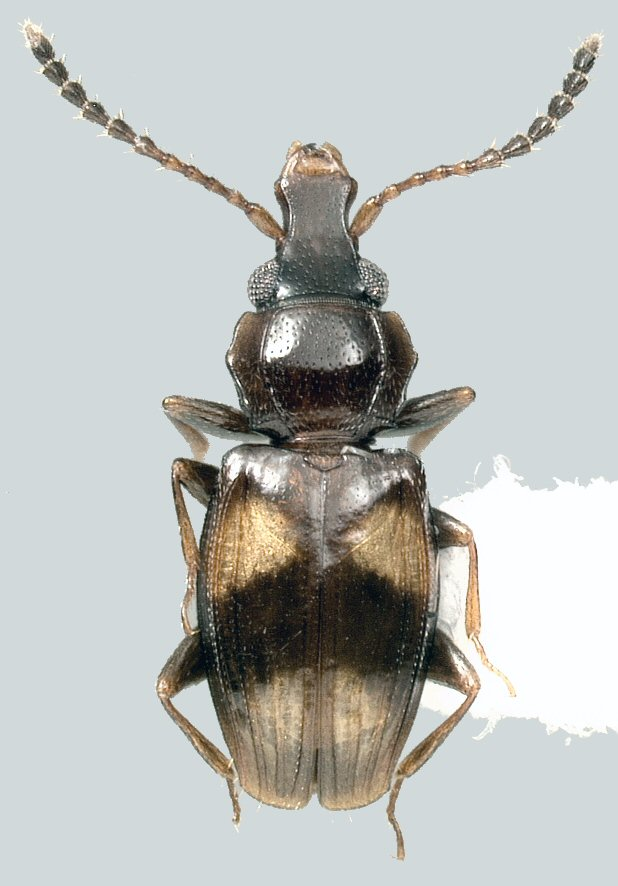
- Metaxyphloeus germaini

Scientific classification
- Domain: Eukaryota
- Kingdom: Animalia
- Phylum: Arthropoda
- Class: Insecta
- Order: Coleoptera
- Suborder: Polyphaga
- Infraorder: Cucujiformia
- Superfamily: Cucujoidea
- Family: Laemophloeidae
- Genus: Metaxyphloeus; Thomas, 1984

= Metaxyphloeus =

Genus of beetles

Metaxyphloeus is a genus of beetles in the family Laemophloeidae, making a part of a small group of rostrate laemophloeid genera endemic to the New World. These beetles are distributed from southern Texas south to Bolivia. The genus is closely related other rostrate genera such as Rhinomalus and Rhinophloeus.

Adults of Metaxyphloeus are characterized by their moderate size (~2 mm) and distinctive features, including prolonged heads, open procoxal cavities, an acuminate intercoxal process on the first visible abdominal ventrite, antennal club consisting of six antennomeres, and male genitalia lacking a dorsal piece of the tegmen. They typically exhibit a dark brown or black coloration, with or without dorsal pubescence, and one or two pairs of pale elytral maculae. Despite their distinctive morphology, little is known about their biology and immature stages. However, adults are occasionally observed being attracted to light in forest habitats.

The function of the rostrum in Metaxyphloeus remains unknown, adding to the intrigue surrounding their biology and behavior.

The five included species are:

- Metaxyphloeus germaini (Grouvelle)
- Metaxyphloeus signatus (Sharp)
- Metaxyphloeus texanus (Schaeffer)
- Metaxyphloeus vicinus (Grouvelle)
- Metaxyphloeus zeus Thomas
