= Passandrophloeus =

Scientific classification
- Kingdom: Animalia
- Phylum: Arthropoda
- Class: Insecta
- Order: Coleoptera
- Suborder: Polyphaga
- Infraorder: Cucujiformia
- Family: Laemophloeidae
- Genus: Passandrophloeus; Kessel, 1921

Genus of beetles

Passandrophloeus is a genus of beetles in the family Laemophloeidae, containing the following species:

- Passandrophloeus belli Grouvelle
- Passandrophloeus ditomoides Grouvelle
- Passandrophloeus falcidens Grouvelle
- Passandrophloeus glabriculus Grouvelle
- Passandrophloeus spinosus Grouvelle
