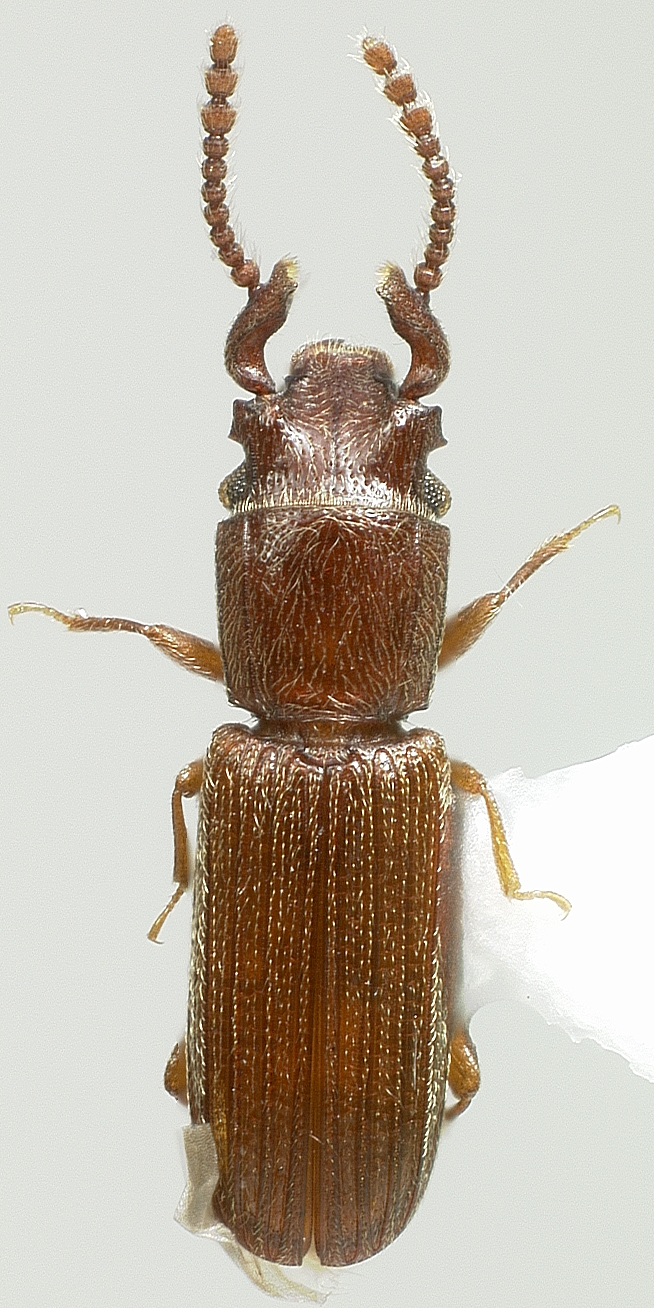
- Dysmerus basalis, male.

Scientific classification
- Kingdom: Animalia
- Phylum: Arthropoda
- Class: Insecta
- Order: Coleoptera
- Suborder: Polyphaga
- Infraorder: Cucujiformia
- Family: Laemophloeidae
- Genus: Dysmerus; Casey, 1884

= Dysmerus =

Genus of beetles

Dysmerus is a genus of beetles in the family Laemophloeidae. Restricted to the New World, until recently Dysmerus included only the type species, D. basalis, described from Florida in the late 19th century. A recent revision resurrected two incorrectly synonymized species and recognized an additional 12 new species, so that the genus currently contains 15 species.

Members of Dysmerus are small (~2mm in length), elongate, subcylindrical, brownish, pubescent beetles with closed procoxal cavities, a narrow intercoxal process of the first ventrite, and lacking an clypeal suture. The salient character of the members of Dysmerus is the possession by males of a grotesquely modified antennal scape and, in both sexes, the position of the pedicel, which arises laterally from the scape. The function of the modified male scape in unknown.

These beetles are rarely collected, although adults are sometimes attracted to light at night. They have been found in the burrows of bark beetles (Curculionidae: Scolytinae) and may be predacious upon them. Dysmerus larvae have not been completely described, but possess mandibles with an acute basal tooth in place of the more usual grinding mola, which may be a modification for predation.

Species of Dysmerus occur from the southeastern U.S. south to Bolivia and in the West Indies. The genus includes the following species:

- Dysmerus basalis Casey
- Dysmerus boliviensis Thomas
- Dysmerus calicicornis Bento, 2025
- Dysmerus caseyi (Grouvelle)
- Dysmerus curvicornis Thomas
- Dysmerus genaspinosus Thomas
- Dysmerus hamaticornis Thomas
- Dysmerus impolitus Thomas
- Dysmerus skelleyi Thomas
- Dysmerus mexicanus Thomas
- Dysmerus monstrosus Thomas
- Dysmerus politus Thomas
- Dysmerus rondoniensis Thomas
- Dysmerus sulcicollis Grouvelle
- Dysmerus symphilus Thomas
- Dysmerus trinidadensis Thomas
