= Mestolaemus =

Mestolaemus longicornis

Scientific classification
- Kingdom: Animalia
- Phylum: Arthropoda
- Class: Insecta
- Order: Coleoptera
- Suborder: Polyphaga
- Infraorder: Cucujiformia
- Family: Laemophloeidae
- Genus: Mestolaemus; Lefkovitch, 1962
- Species: M. longicornis

Binomial name
- Mestolaemus longicornis Lefkovitch, 1962

Genus of beetles

Mestolaemus fallax is a species of beetle in the family Laemophloeidae, the only species in the genus Mestolaemus.
