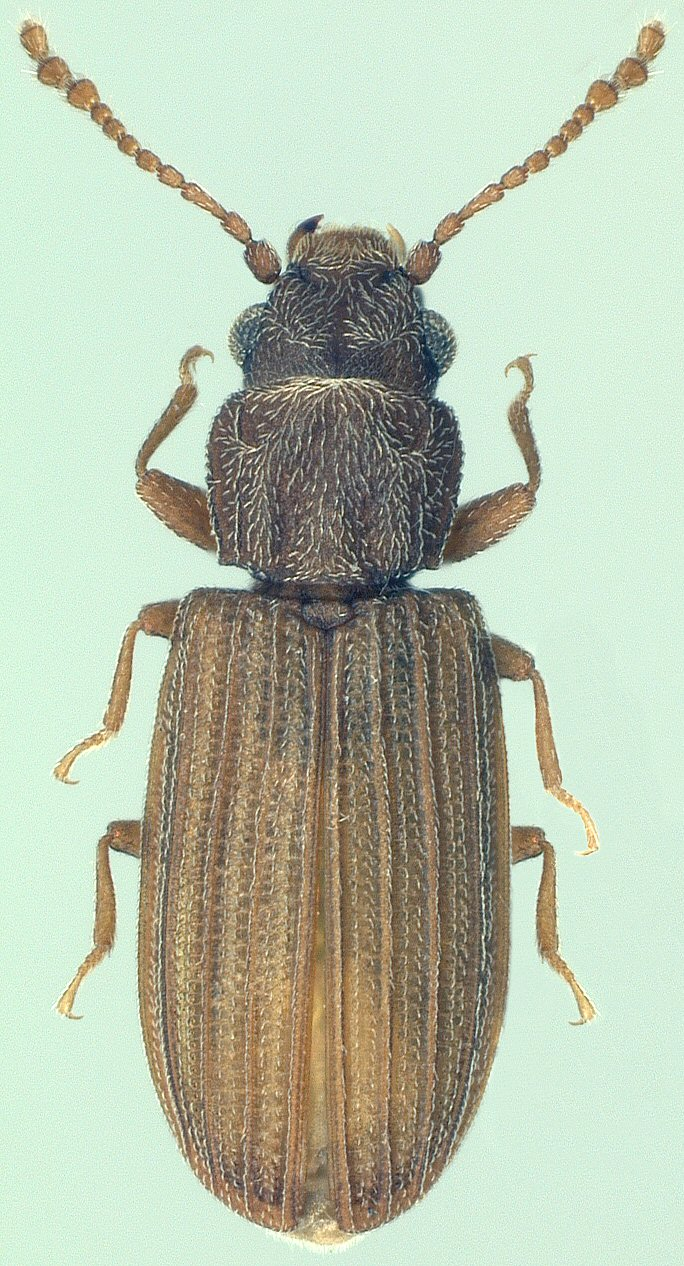
- Acompsophloeus arabicus

Scientific classification
- Kingdom: Animalia
- Phylum: Arthropoda
- Class: Insecta
- Order: Coleoptera
- Suborder: Polyphaga
- Infraorder: Cucujiformia
- Family: Laemophloeidae
- Genus: Acompsophloeus; Thomas, 2010
- Species: A. arabicus

Binomial name
- Acompsophloeus arabicus Thomas, 2010

= Acompsophloeus =

Genus of beetles

Acompsophloeus is a genus of beetles in the family Laemophloeidae. The only known species in the genus is Acompsophloeus arabicus, a small (1.4-2.0 mm) yellowish-brown beetle with extremely coarse surface sculpture, short antennae, and male genitalia with the parameres completely fused to the basal piece. It is known only from the Arabian Peninsula (United Arab Emirates and Saudi Arabia). Nothing is known of its biology or immature stages.
