= Phloeipsius =

Phloeipsius fraudator

Scientific classification
- Kingdom: Animalia
- Phylum: Arthropoda
- Class: Insecta
- Order: Coleoptera
- Suborder: Polyphaga
- Infraorder: Cucujiformia
- Family: Laemophloeidae
- Genus: Phloeipsius; Casey, 1916
- Species: P. fraudator

Binomial name
- Phloeipsius fraudator (Sharp, 1899)

Genus of beetles

Phloeipsius fraudator is a species of beetle in the family Laemophloeidae, the only species in the genus Phloeipsius.
