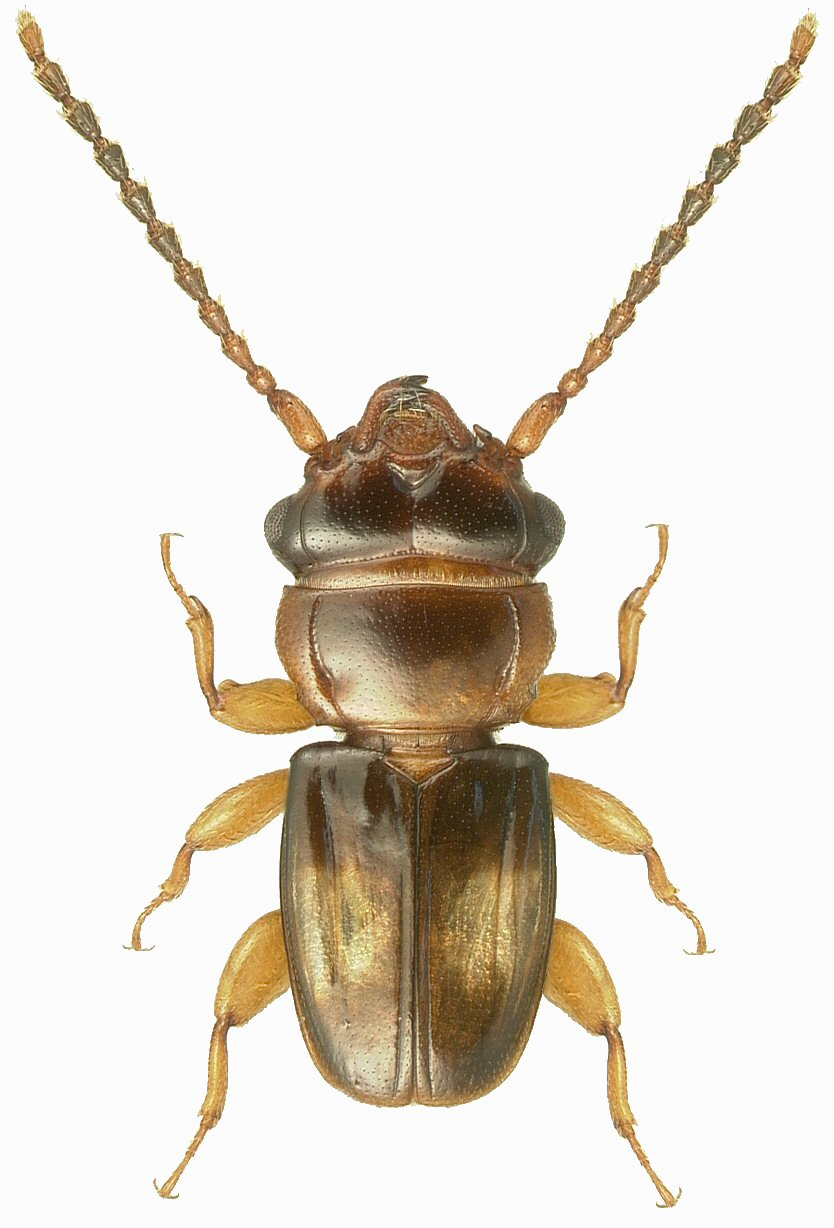
- Laemophloeus germaini

Scientific classification
- Domain: Eukaryota
- Kingdom: Animalia
- Phylum: Arthropoda
- Class: Insecta
- Order: Coleoptera
- Suborder: Polyphaga
- Infraorder: Cucujiformia
- Family: Laemophloeidae
- Genus: Laemophloeus; Dejean, 1836

= Laemophloeus =

Genus of beetles

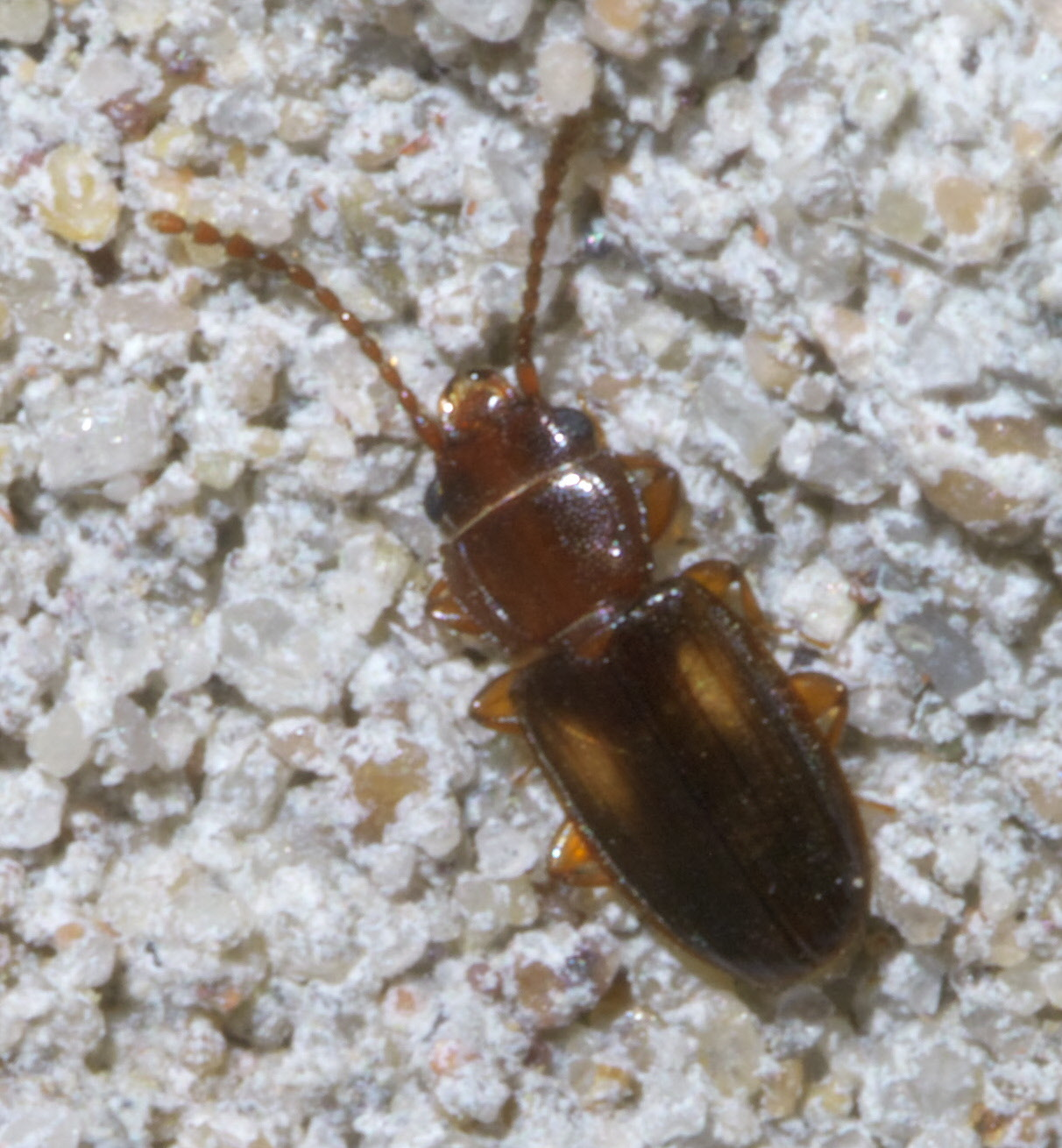

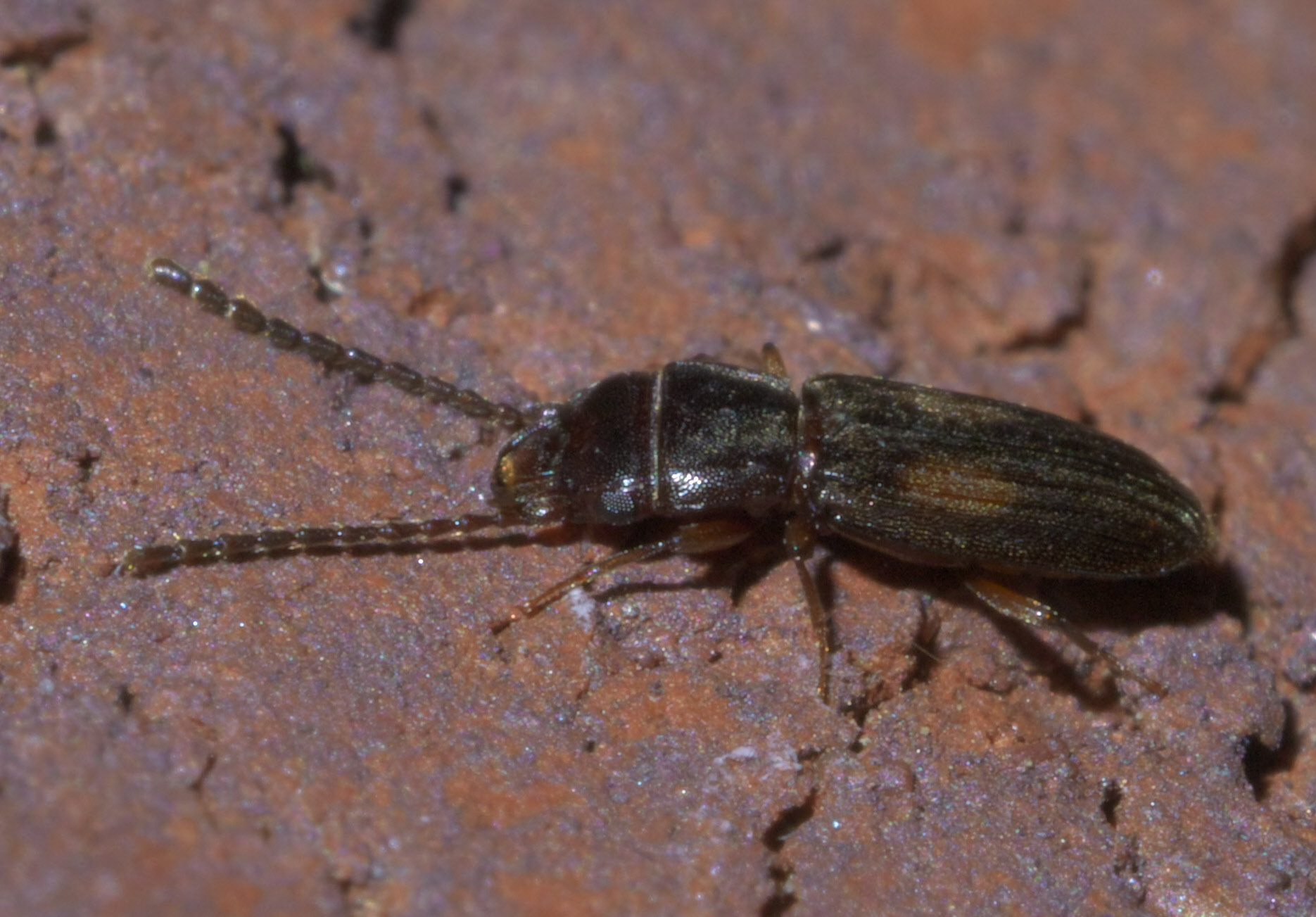

Laemophloeus is a genus of beetles; it is the type genus of the family Laemophloeidae. The genus has been almost completely reviewed in modern times.

Following Lefkovitch, by recognizing only those species congeneric with the type species, Laemophloeus monilis (Fabricius), as valid members of the genus, this reduces the size of the genus from more than a hundred species to only 28, as follows (with their distribution):

- Laemophloeus apache (Thomas) [North America]
- Laemophloeus biguttatus (Say) [North America]
- Laemophloeus buenavista (Thomas) [Mexico, Central and South America]
- Laemophloeus capitisculptus (Thomas) [South America]
- Laemophloeus concinnus (Thomas) [Central and South America]
- Laemophloeus corporoflavus (Thomas) [South America]
- Laemophloeus dozieri (Thomas) [South America]
- Laemophloeus fasciatus (Melsheimer) [North America]
- Laemophloeus fervidus (Casey) [North America]
- Laemophloeus germaini (Grouvelle) [Central and South America]
- Laemophloeus incisus (Sharp) [Central and South America]
- Laemophloeus insulatestudinas (Thomas) [Galapagos]
- Laemophloeus kraussi (Ganglbauer) [Europe]
- Laemophloeus lecontei (Grouvelle) [North, Central, and South America, West Indies]
- Laemophloeus macrognathus (Reitter) [Central and South America]
- Laemophloeus mathani (Grouvelle) [South America]
- Laemophloeus megacephalus (Grouvelle) [North, Central, and South America, West Indies]
- Laemophloeus monilis (Fabricius) [Europe, North Africa, Asia]
- Laemophloeus muticus (Fabricius) [Europe, Asia]
- Laemophloeus nigricollis (Lucas) [Europe, North Africa]
- Laemophloeus planaclavatus (Thomas) [South America]
- Laemophloeus ribbei (Reitter) [Siberia]
- Laemophloeus sexarticulatus (Kessel) [Mexico, Central and South America]
- Laemophloeus shastanus (Casey) [North America]
- Laemophloeus souzalimai Bento [South America]
- Laemophloeus submonilis (Reitter) [Japan, Siberia]
- Laemophloeus suturalis (Reitter) [North, Central and South America]
- Laemophloeus taurus (Thomas) [Mexico, South America]
- Laemophloeus terminalis (Casey) [North America]

Those species still listed as Laemophloeus in published or online lists (e.g. Joel Hallan's Biology Catalog) should be listed as Laemophloeus (sens. lat.).

Like most members of the Laemophloeidae, Laemophloeus species are found under the bark of dead trees, where they appear to feed primarily on fungi, especially ascomycetes. They range in size from moderate to large for the family (2–4 mm in length). The members of the genus occur throughout the Palaearctic and Nearctic realms, but extend south into the tropics in the New World, where five other closely related genera are found.
