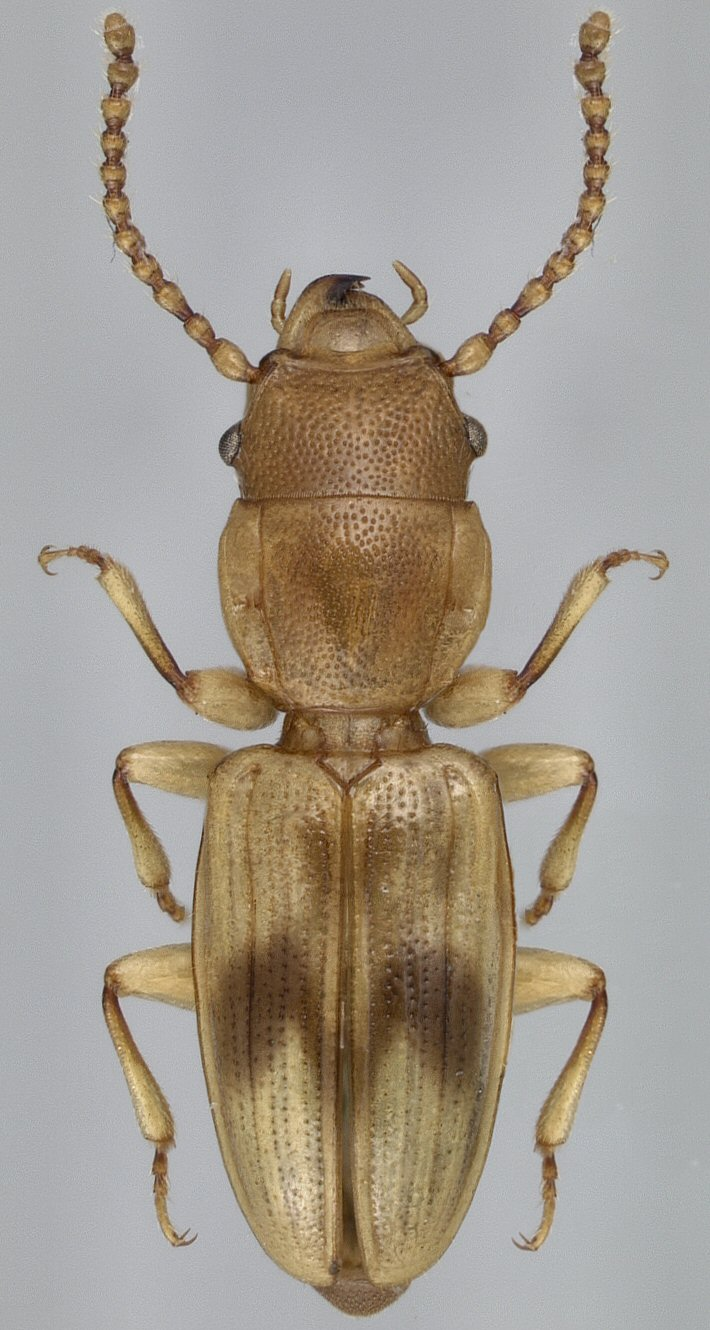

Scientific classification
- Kingdom: Animalia
- Phylum: Arthropoda
- Class: Insecta
- Order: Coleoptera
- Suborder: Polyphaga
- Infraorder: Cucujiformia
- Family: Laemophloeidae
- Genus: Blubos; Lefkovitch, 1962
- Species: B. matris

Binomial name
- Blubos matris Lefkovitch, 1962

= Blubos =

Genus of beetles

Blubos is a genus of beetles in the family Laemophloeidae. The only known species in the genus is Blubos matris, a large (4 mm) yellowish beetle with darkly fasciate elytra. It differs from all other known laemophloeids in that the lateral margins of the pronotum are visible in dorsal view. It is known from a single specimen collected more than 60 years ago in the Democratic Republic of the Congo. Nothing is known of its biology or immature stages.
