= Rhabdophloeus =

Scientific classification
- Kingdom: Animalia
- Phylum: Arthropoda
- Class: Insecta
- Order: Coleoptera
- Suborder: Polyphaga
- Infraorder: Cucujiformia
- Superfamily: Cucujoidea
- Family: Laemophloeidae
- Genus: Rhabdophloeus; Sharp, 1899

Genus of beetles

Rhabdophloeus is a genus of beetles in the family Laemophloeidae, containing the following species:

- Rhabdophloeus chiriquensis Sharp
- Rhabdophloeus concolor Sharp
- Rhabdophloeus costatus Grouvelle
- Rhabdophloeus dispar Sharp
- Rhabdophloeus horni Casey
