= Magnoleptus =

Scientific classification
- Kingdom: Animalia
- Phylum: Arthropoda
- Class: Insecta
- Order: Coleoptera
- Suborder: Polyphaga
- Infraorder: Cucujiformia
- Family: Laemophloeidae
- Genus: Magnoleptus; Lefkovitch, 1962

Genus of beetles

Magnoleptus is a genus of beetles in the family Laemophloeidae, containing the following species:

- Magnoleptus parallelicollis Lefkovitch, 1962
- Magnoleptus pugnaceus Lefkovitch, 1962
