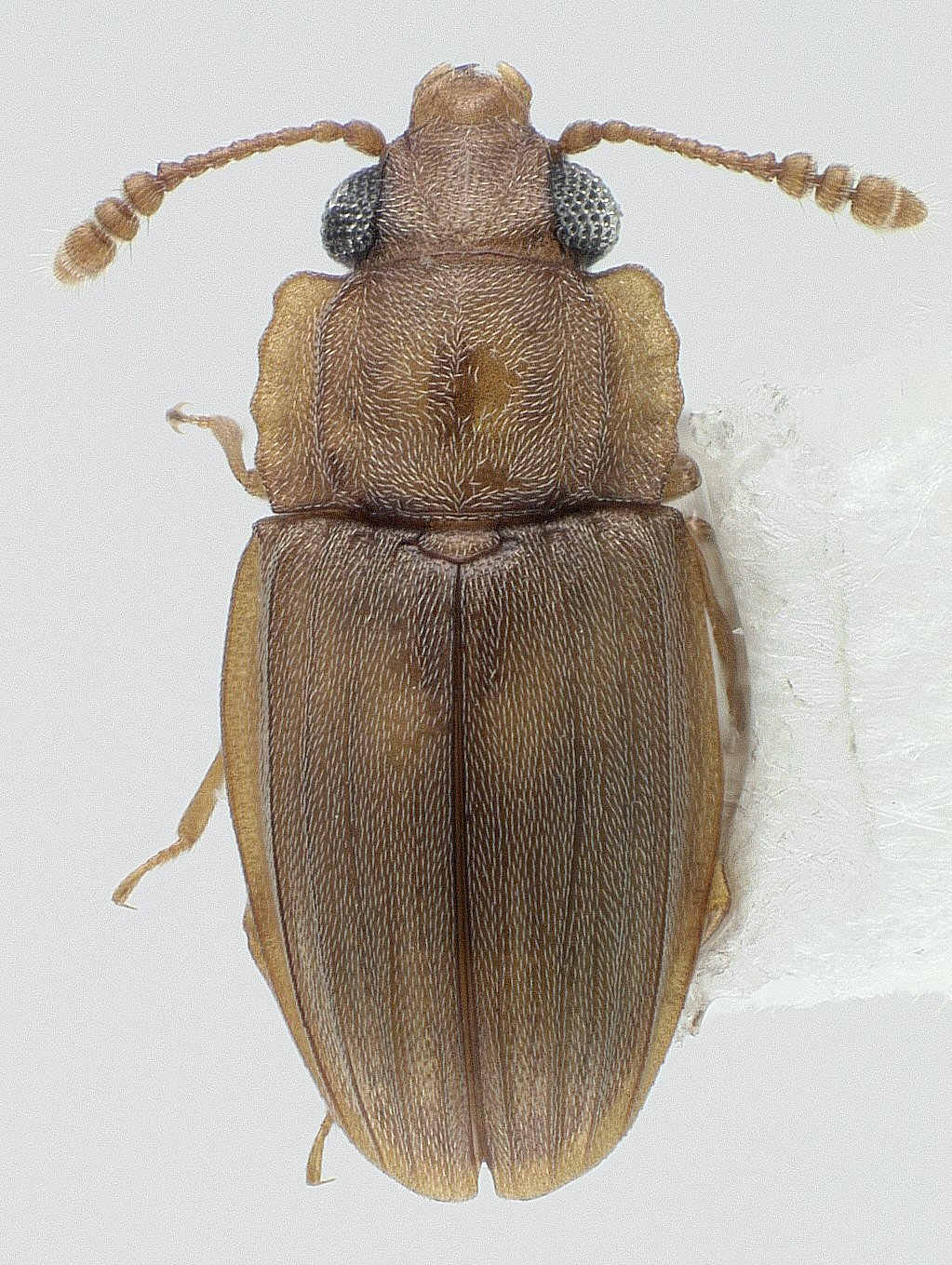

Scientific classification
- Domain: Eukaryota
- Kingdom: Animalia
- Phylum: Arthropoda
- Class: Insecta
- Order: Coleoptera
- Suborder: Polyphaga
- Infraorder: Cucujiformia
- Family: Laemophloeidae
- Genus: Odontophloeus; Thomas, 1984

= Odontophloeus =

Genus of beetles

Odontophloeus is a genus of beetles in the family Laemophloeidae, containing the following species:

- Odontophloeus crybetes Thomas
- Odontophloeus dives Sharp
- Odontophloeus kesseli Hetschko
- Odontophloeus quadridentatus Champion
