= Cucujinus =

Scientific classification
- Kingdom: Animalia
- Phylum: Arthropoda
- Class: Insecta
- Order: Coleoptera
- Suborder: Polyphaga
- Infraorder: Cucujiformia
- Superfamily: Cucujoidea
- Family: Laemophloeidae
- Genus: Cucujinus; Arrow, 1920

Genus of beetles

Cucujinus is a genus of beetles in the family Laemophloeidae, containing the following species:

- Cucujinus brevipennis Grouvelle
- Cucujinus coquereli Grouvelle
- Cucujinus curtipennis Grouvelle
- Cucujinus micromma Arrow, 1920
- Cucujinus nebulosus Grouvelle
