= Pseudophloeus =

Pseudophloeus fuscicornis

Scientific classification
- Kingdom: Animalia
- Phylum: Arthropoda
- Class: Insecta
- Order: Coleoptera
- Suborder: Polyphaga
- Infraorder: Cucujiformia
- Family: Laemophloeidae
- Genus: Pseudophloeus; Yablokov-Khnzoryan, 1977
- Species: P. fuscicornis

Binomial name
- Pseudophloeus fuscicornis Reitter

Genus of beetles

Pseudophloeus fuscicornis is a species of beetle in the family Laemophloeidae, the only species in the genus Pseudophloeus.
