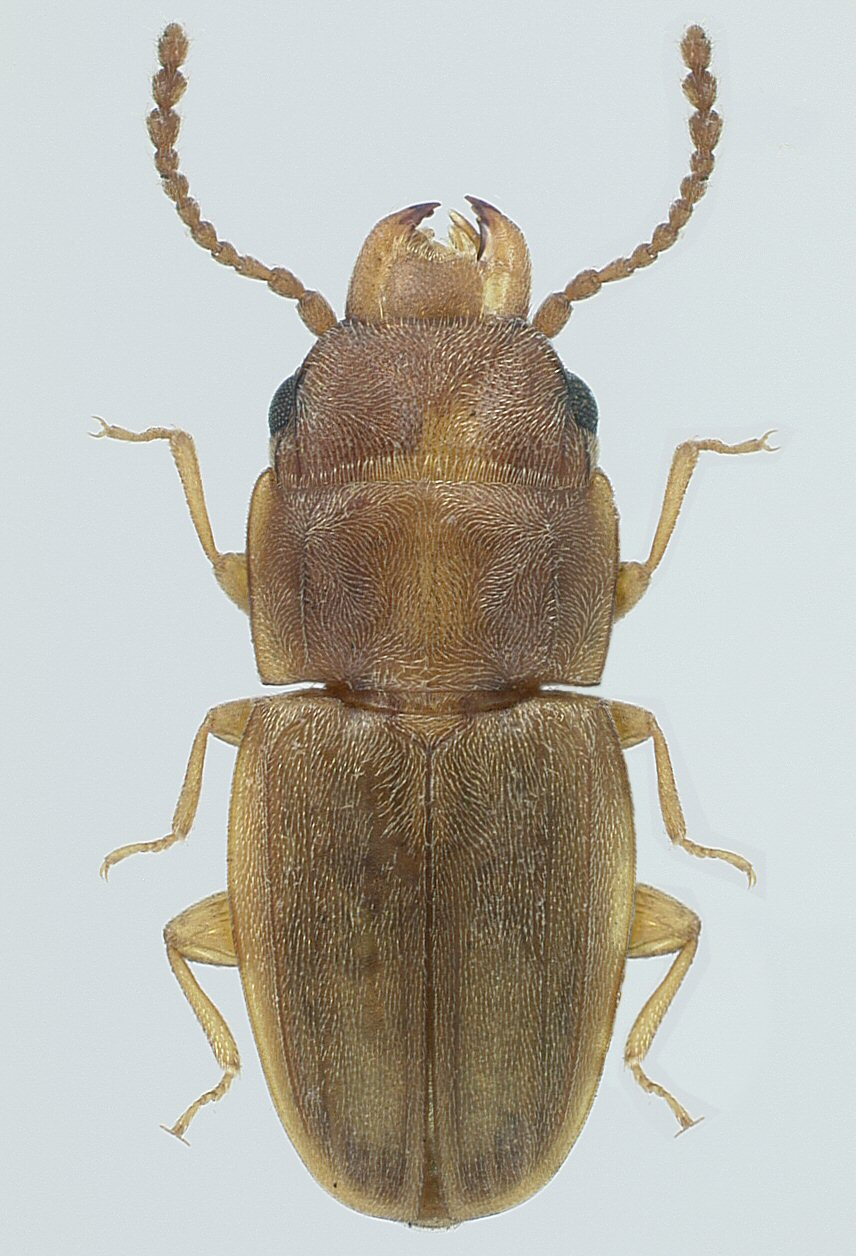
- Paraphloeolaemus vorticosus

Scientific classification
- Kingdom: Animalia
- Phylum: Arthropoda
- Class: Insecta
- Order: Coleoptera
- Suborder: Polyphaga
- Infraorder: Cucujiformia
- Family: Laemophloeidae
- Genus: Paraphloeolaemus; Thomas, 2017

= Paraphloeolaemus =

Genus of beetles

Paraphloeolaemus is a genus of beetles in the family Laemophloeidae. It was described in 2017, for two species of Neotropical laemophloeids that did not fit comfortably into existing genera. A possible third species is represented by a single damaged specimen that could not be described until additional specimens are found.

Paraphloeolaemus species are small (1.1 mm-1.9 mm), broadly flattened, testaceous beetles with conspicuous pubescence, wide open procoxal cavities, a 5-5-5 tarsal formula in both sexes, and a coiled flagellum in the male. Some specimens were collected at light, and one at rotting breadfruit. Otherwise, nothing is known of their biology or immature stages.

Currently included species and their known distribution are:

- Paraphloeolaemus vorticosus Thomas (South America)
- Paraphloeolaemus pterosiagon Thomas (Honduras)
- Paraphloeolaemus sp.? (Panama)
