= Nipponophloeus =

Scientific classification
- Kingdom: Animalia
- Phylum: Arthropoda
- Class: Insecta
- Order: Coleoptera
- Suborder: Polyphaga
- Infraorder: Cucujiformia
- Family: Laemophloeidae
- Genus: Nipponophloeus; Sasaji, 1983

Genus of beetles

Nipponophloeus is a genus of beetles in the family Laemophloeidae, containing the following species:

- Nipponophloeus boninensis Nakane
- Nipponophloeus dorcoides Reitter
