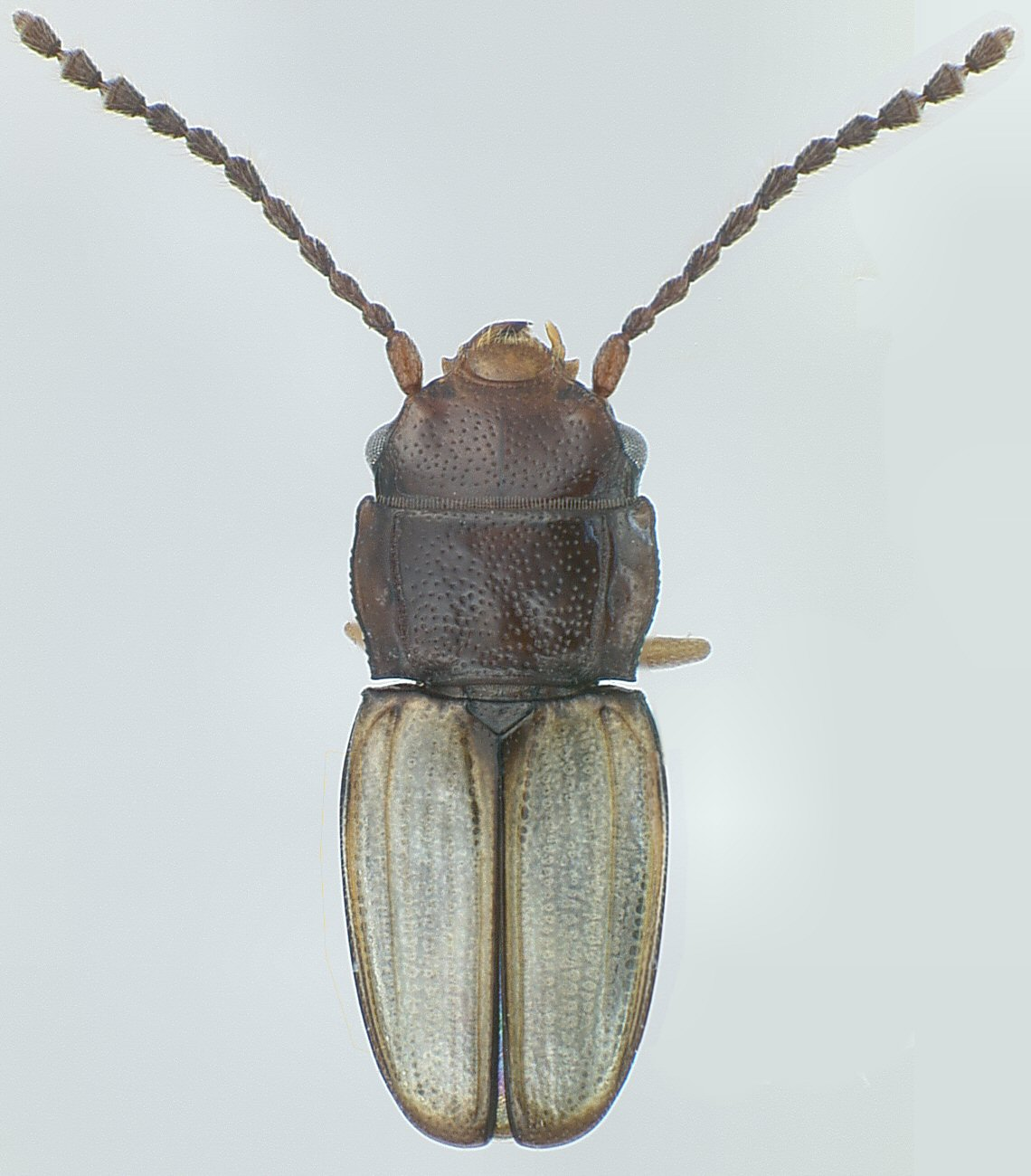
- Dorsal habitus AutoMontage photo of Phloeolaemus hoplites

Scientific classification
- Kingdom: Animalia
- Phylum: Arthropoda
- Class: Insecta
- Order: Coleoptera
- Suborder: Polyphaga
- Infraorder: Cucujiformia
- Superfamily: Cucujoidea
- Family: Laemophloeidae
- Genus: Phloeolaemus; Casey, 1916

= Phloeolaemus =

Genus of beetles

Phloeolaemus is a genus of beetles in the family Laemophloeidae, containing the following species:

- Phloeolaemus anticus Sharp
- Phloeolaemus boops Sharp
- Phloeolaemus chamaeropis Schwarz
- Phloeolaemus championi Sharp
- Phloeolaemus curtus Grouvelle
- Phloeolaemus endomychus Sharp
- Phloeolaemus hoplites Sharp
- Phloeolaemus ignobilis Sharp
- Phloeolaemus immersus Sharp
- Phloeolaemus impressus Grouvelle
- Phloeolaemus macrocephalus Schaeffer
- Phloeolaemus punctulaticollis Hetschko
- Phloeolaemus quinquearticulatus Grouvelle
- Phloeolaemus reitteri Grouvelle
- Phloeolaemus sharpi Hetschko
- Phloeolaemus teapensis Grouvelle
