= Rhinophloeus =

Scientific classification
- Kingdom: Animalia
- Phylum: Arthropoda
- Class: Insecta
- Order: Coleoptera
- Suborder: Polyphaga
- Infraorder: Cucujiformia
- Family: Laemophloeidae
- Genus: Rhinophloeus; Sharp, 1899

Genus of beetles

Rhinophloeus is a genus of beetles in the family Laemophloeidae, containing the following species:

- Rhinophloeus elegans Grouvelle
- Rhinophloeus facetus Grouvelle
- Rhinophloeus gracilis Sharp
- Rhinophloeus nasutus Sharp
- Rhinophloeus productus Grouvelle
- Rhinophloeus salpingoides Grouvelle
