= Narthecius =

Scientific classification
- Kingdom: Animalia
- Phylum: Arthropoda
- Class: Insecta
- Order: Coleoptera
- Suborder: Polyphaga
- Infraorder: Cucujiformia
- Superfamily: Cucujoidea
- Family: Laemophloeidae
- Genus: Narthecius; J.LeConte, 1861

Genus of beetles

Narthecius is a genus of beetles in the family Laemophloeidae, containing the following species:

- Narthecius crassiceps Sharp
- Narthecius grandiceps LeConte
- Narthecius haroldi Reitter
- Narthecius longicollis (Sharp)
- Narthecius monticola Fall
- Narthecius schedli Lefkovitch
- Narthecius simulator Casey
- Narthecius striaticeps Fall
- Narthecius suturalis Grouvelle
