= Sinuatophloeus =

Scientific classification
- Kingdom: Animalia
- Phylum: Arthropoda
- Class: Insecta
- Order: Coleoptera
- Suborder: Polyphaga
- Infraorder: Cucujiformia
- Family: Laemophloeidae
- Genus: Sinuatophloeus; Kessel, 1921

Genus of beetles

Sinuatophloeus is a genus of beetles in the family Laemophloeidae, containing the following species:

- Sinuatophloeus juvencus Kessel, 1921
- Sinuatophloeus nigricans Kessel, 1921
