= Charaphloeus =

Scientific classification
- Kingdom: Animalia
- Phylum: Arthropoda
- Class: Insecta
- Order: Coleoptera
- Suborder: Polyphaga
- Infraorder: Cucujiformia
- Superfamily: Cucujoidea
- Family: Laemophloeidae
- Genus: Charaphloeus; Casey, 1916

Genus of beetles

Charaphloeus is a genus of beetles in the family Laemophloeidae, containing the following species:

- Charaphloeus adustus LeConte
- Charaphloeus alticola Sharp
- Charaphloeus amulae Sharp
- Charaphloeus annectens Sharp
- Charaphloeus bituberculatus Reitter
- Charaphloeus carabinus Sharp
- Charaphloeus celatus Sharp
- Charaphloeus clavicornis Sharp
- Charaphloeus convexulus LeConte
- Charaphloeus convexus Grouvelle
- Charaphloeus corporalis Sharp
- Charaphloeus dimidiatus Schaeffer
- Charaphloeus distans Sharp
- Charaphloeus flavescens Sharp
- Charaphloeus flavosignatus Schaeffer
- Charaphloeus frequens Sharp
- Charaphloeus guatemalenus Sharp
- Charaphloeus insolitus Sharp
- Charaphloeus inustus Sharp
- Charaphloeus optatus Sharp
- Charaphloeus striatus Sharp
