= Heterojinus =

Heterojinus semilaetanus

Scientific classification
- Kingdom: Animalia
- Phylum: Arthropoda
- Clade: Pancrustacea
- Class: Insecta
- Order: Coleoptera
- Suborder: Polyphaga
- Infraorder: Cucujiformia
- Family: Laemophloeidae
- Genus: Heterojinus; Sengupta & Mukhopadhyay, 1978
- Species: H. semilaetanus

Binomial name
- Heterojinus semilaetanus Grouvelle

Genus of beetles

Heterojinus semilaetanus is a species of beetle in the family Laemophloeidae, the only species in the genus Heterojinus.

== Taxonomy and distribution ==
Heterojinus semilaetanus was described by the French entomologist Antoine Henri Grouvelle in 1913. The genus Heterojinus was subsequently established by Sengupta and Mukhopadhyay in 1978, with its description published in the Bulletin of the Zoological Survey of India. The beetle has been recorded in India, where it appears in government lists of protected wildlife under the alternative spelling Heterojinus semilaetaneus. These lists place the species in the family Cucujidae, reflecting an older taxonomic classification.
