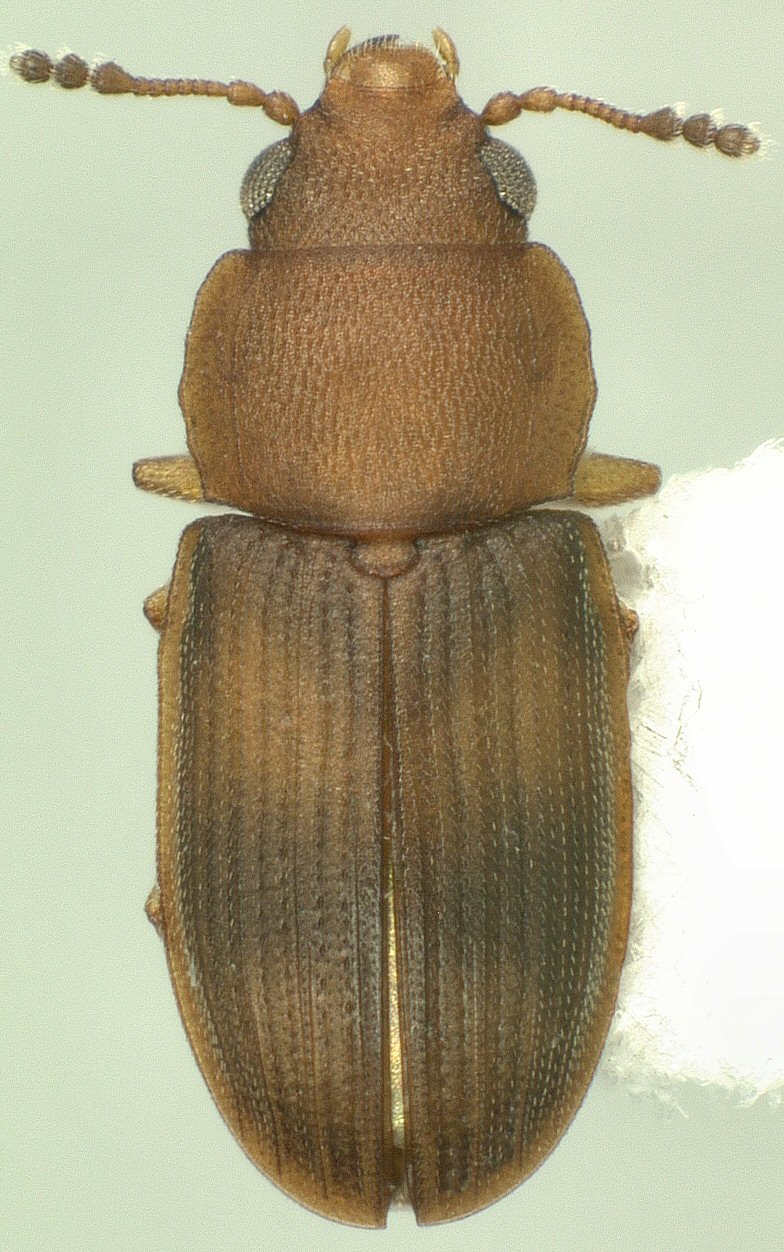
- Lathropus parvulus

Scientific classification
- Kingdom: Animalia
- Phylum: Arthropoda
- Class: Insecta
- Order: Coleoptera
- Suborder: Polyphaga
- Infraorder: Cucujiformia
- Family: Laemophloeidae
- Genus: Lathropus; Erichson, 1846

= Lathropus =

Genus of beetles

Lathropus is a genus of beetles in the family Laemophloeidae. It has been the subject of recent taxonomic study. Lathropus species are minute (<2mm) flattened beetles with short, clubbed antennae, closed mesocoxal cavities, extremely dense surface sculpture, and dorsal pubescence composed of bifurcate setae. Currently recognized valid species are:

- Lathropus chickcharnie Thomas
- Lathropus jamaicensis Thomas
- Lathropus minimus Champion
- Lathropus parvulus Grouvelle
- Lathropus pictus Schwarz
- Lathropus pubescens Casey
- Lathropus rhabdophloeoides Thomas
- Lathropus robustulus Casey
- Lathropus sepicola (Müller in Germar)
- Lathropus striatus Casey, 1916
- Lathropus vernalis Casey

All but one of the known species of Lathropus are indigenous to the New World. The one exception, L. sepicola, is found in Europe. Adults and larvae are associated with dead trees and feed on fungi.
