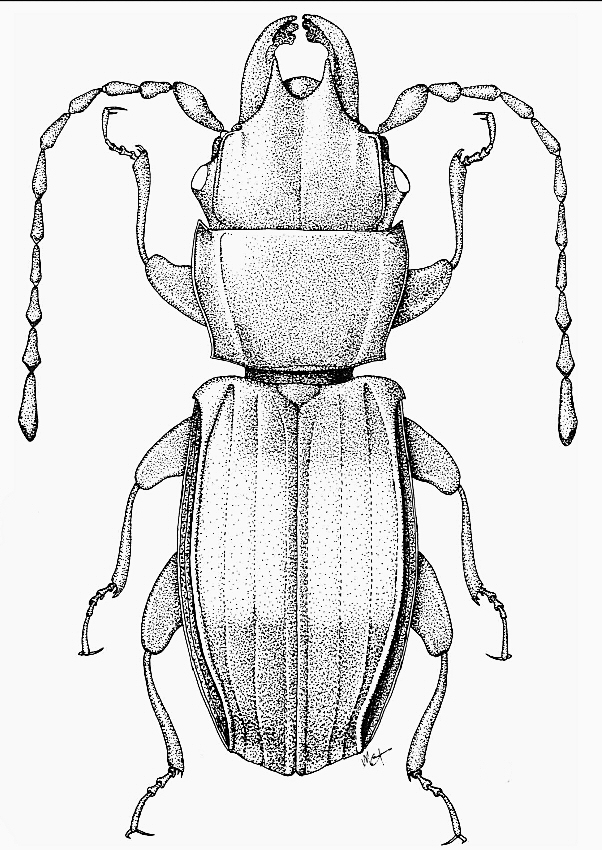
- Deinophloeus sheilae

Scientific classification
- Kingdom: Animalia
- Phylum: Arthropoda
- Class: Insecta
- Order: Coleoptera
- Suborder: Polyphaga
- Infraorder: Cucujiformia
- Superfamily: Cucujoidea
- Family: Laemophloeidae
- Genus: Deinophloeus; Sharp, 1899

= Deinophloeus =

Genus of beetles

Deinophloeus is a small genus of beetles in the family Laemophloeidae, limited to the New World, where five species are known to occur from Arizona south to Panama. Members of the genus are relatively large for the family, ranging from about 2.5mm to over 4mm in length. Members of the genus are characterized by the absence of a frontoclypeal suture, closed procoxal cavities and, in the male, elongate mandibles, clypeal horns, and modified elytral apices. The immature stages are unknown, and nothing is known about their habits or habitats.

The genus contains the following species:

- Deinophloeus ducalis Sharp
- Deinophloeus hirsutus Thomas
- Deinophloeus impressifrons (Schaeffer)
- Deinophloeus sheilae Thomas
- Deinophloeus sinuatus Sharp
