= Mariolaemus =

Scientific classification
- Kingdom: Animalia
- Phylum: Arthropoda
- Class: Insecta
- Order: Coleoptera
- Suborder: Polyphaga
- Infraorder: Cucujiformia
- Family: Laemophloeidae
- Genus: Mariolaemus; Lefkovitch, 1962

Genus of beetles

Mariolaemus is a genus of beetles in the family Laemophloeidae, containing the following species:

- Mariolaemus eichelbaumi Grouvelle
- Mariolaemus escalerai Grouvelle
- Mariolaemus livens Grouvelle
- Mariolaemus misellus Grouvelle
