= Rhinomalus =

Scientific classification
- Domain: Eukaryota
- Kingdom: Animalia
- Phylum: Arthropoda
- Class: Insecta
- Order: Coleoptera
- Suborder: Polyphaga
- Infraorder: Cucujiformia
- Superfamily: Cucujoidea
- Family: Laemophloeidae
- Genus: Rhinomalus; Gemm, 1870

Genus of beetles

Rhinomalus is a genus of beetles in the family Laemophloeidae, containing the following species:

- Rhinomalus anthracinus Sharp
- Rhinomalus chriquensis Sharp
- Rhinomalus ruficollis Grouvelle
- Rhinomalus rufirostris Chevrolat
