= Xylolestes =

Scientific classification
- Domain: Eukaryota
- Kingdom: Animalia
- Phylum: Arthropoda
- Class: Insecta
- Order: Coleoptera
- Suborder: Polyphaga
- Infraorder: Cucujiformia
- Superfamily: Cucujoidea
- Family: Laemophloeidae
- Genus: Xylolestes; Lefkovitch, 1962

Genus of beetles

Xylolestes is a genus of beetles in the family Laemophloeidae, found in temperate Asia.

== Species ==
The following species belong to the genus Xylolestes:

- Xylolestes krombeini Slipinski
- Xylolestes laevior Reitter
- Xylolestes lepidus Grouvelle
- Xylolestes ovalis Grouvelle
- Xylolestes unicolor Grouvelle
