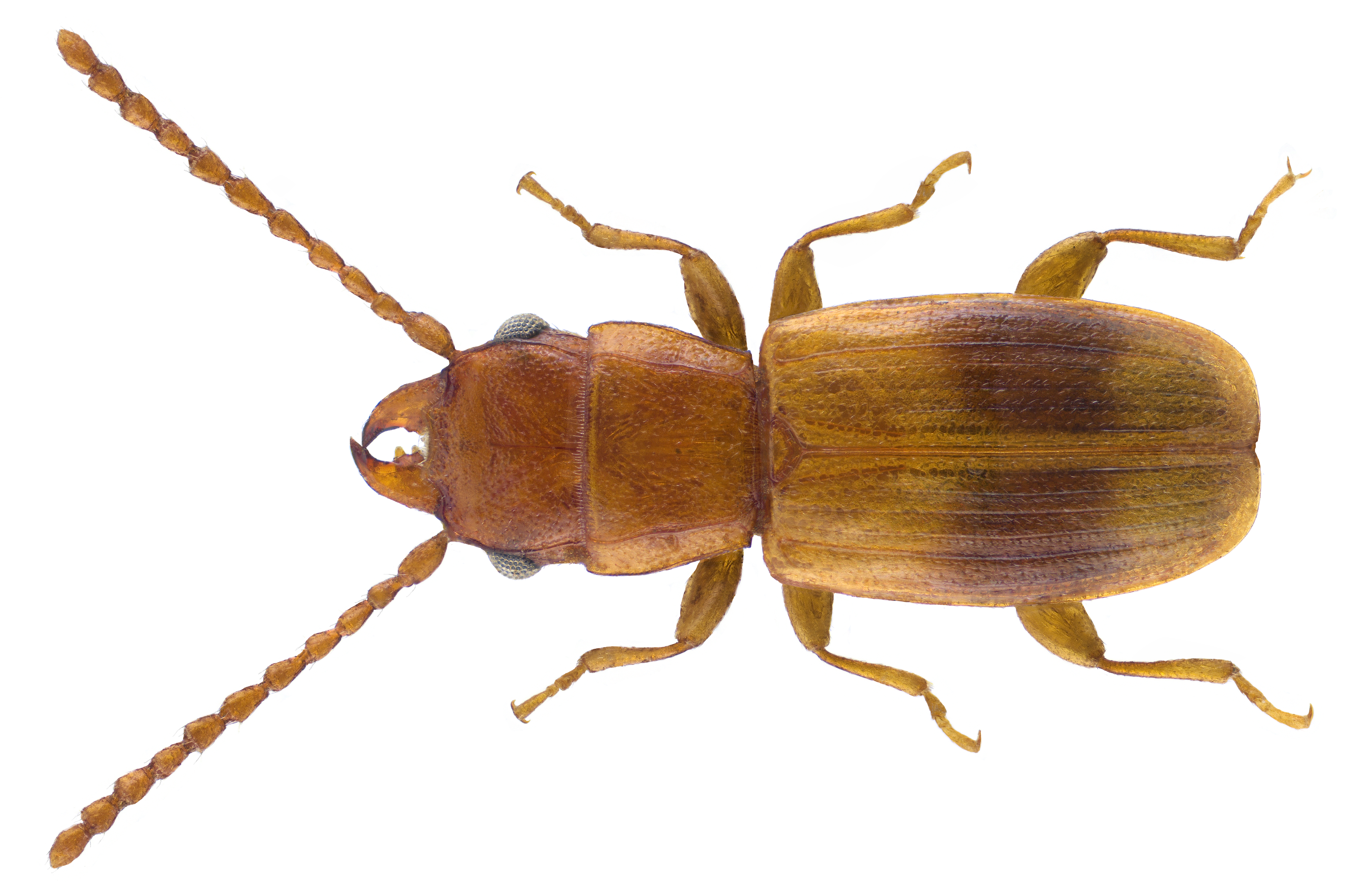
- Notolaemus unifasciatus

Scientific classification
- Domain: Eukaryota
- Kingdom: Animalia
- Phylum: Arthropoda
- Class: Insecta
- Order: Coleoptera
- Suborder: Polyphaga
- Infraorder: Cucujiformia
- Superfamily: Cucujoidea
- Family: Laemophloeidae
- Genus: Notolaemus; Lefkovitch, 1959

= Notolaemus =

Genus of beetles

Notolaemus is a genus of beetles in the family Laemophloeidae, containing the following species [list incomplete]:

- Notolaemus castaneus Erichson
- Notolaemus clarus Grouvelle
- Notolaemus cribratus Reitter
- Notolaemus elli Lefkovitch
- Notolaemus lewisi Reitter
- Notolaemus liganus Lefkovitch
- Notolaemus peringueyi Grouvelle
- Notolaemus perrieri Grouvelle
- Notolaemus perspicuus Grouvelle
- Notolaemus picinus Grouvelle
- Notolaemus riartus Lefkovitch
- Notolaemus unifasciatus Latreille
- Notolaemus ussuriensis Iablokoff-Khnzorian
