= Carinophloeus =

Scientific classification
- Kingdom: Animalia
- Phylum: Arthropoda
- Class: Insecta
- Order: Coleoptera
- Suborder: Polyphaga
- Infraorder: Cucujiformia
- Family: Laemophloeidae
- Genus: Carinophloeus; Lefkovitch, 1961

Genus of beetles

Carinophloeus is a genus of beetles in the family Laemophloeidae consisting of only two obscure, uncommonly collected species. Carinophloeus is one of only two laemophloeid genera having the middle coxal cavities closed by the meso- and metasternum. The species are small, flattened brownish beetles with abundant pubescence composed of thick, reclinate setae, and carinate pronotum and elytra. The type species of the genus, Carinophloeus raffrayi, is the only laemophloeid currently known with antennal grooves; C. zairensis has antennae of only 10 antennomeres.

Recent research has found that the beetle family Laemophloeidae which Carinophloeus raffrayi is part of, isn’t one clean group like scientists used to think—it’s more mixed up, and Carinophloeus might actually belong to a different branch than expected.This meaning they can possibly be a part of a new lineage from the superfamily.

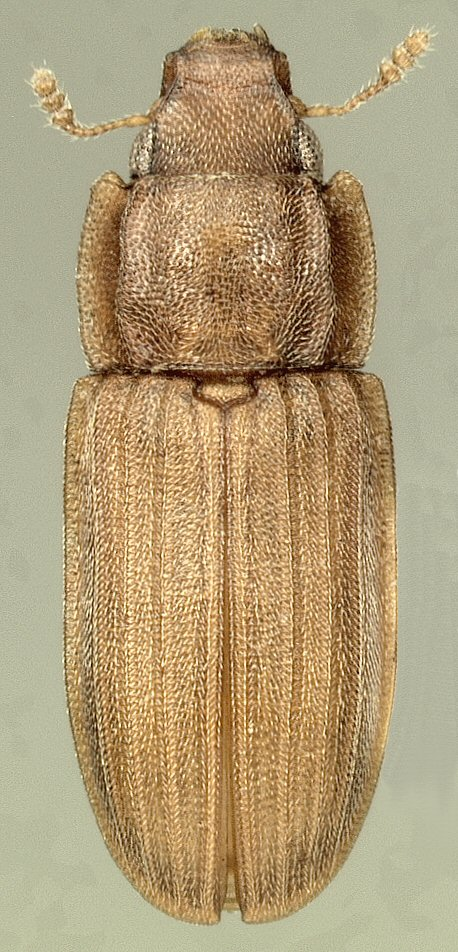
Dorsal habitus montage photograph of Carinophloeus raffrayi.

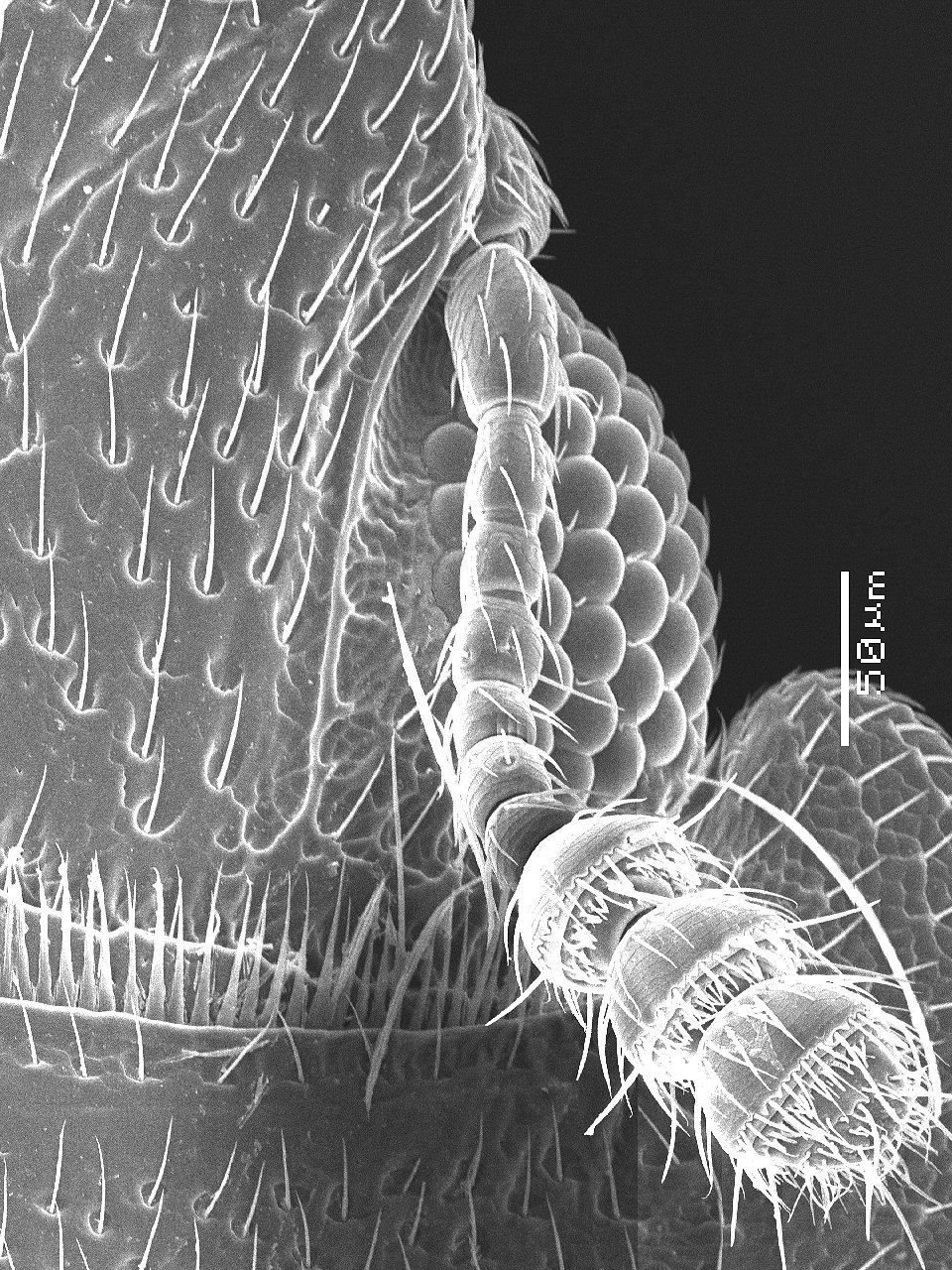
SEM photo of antennal groove of Carinophloeus raffrayi

The known species are:

- Carinophloeus raffrayi https://resjournals.onlinelibrary.wiley.com/doi/full/10.1111/syen.12133
- Carinophloeus zairensis Slipinski

The genus is known to occur in Africa and Asia. The immature stages and habits are completely unknown. The adults occasionally are attracted to light.
