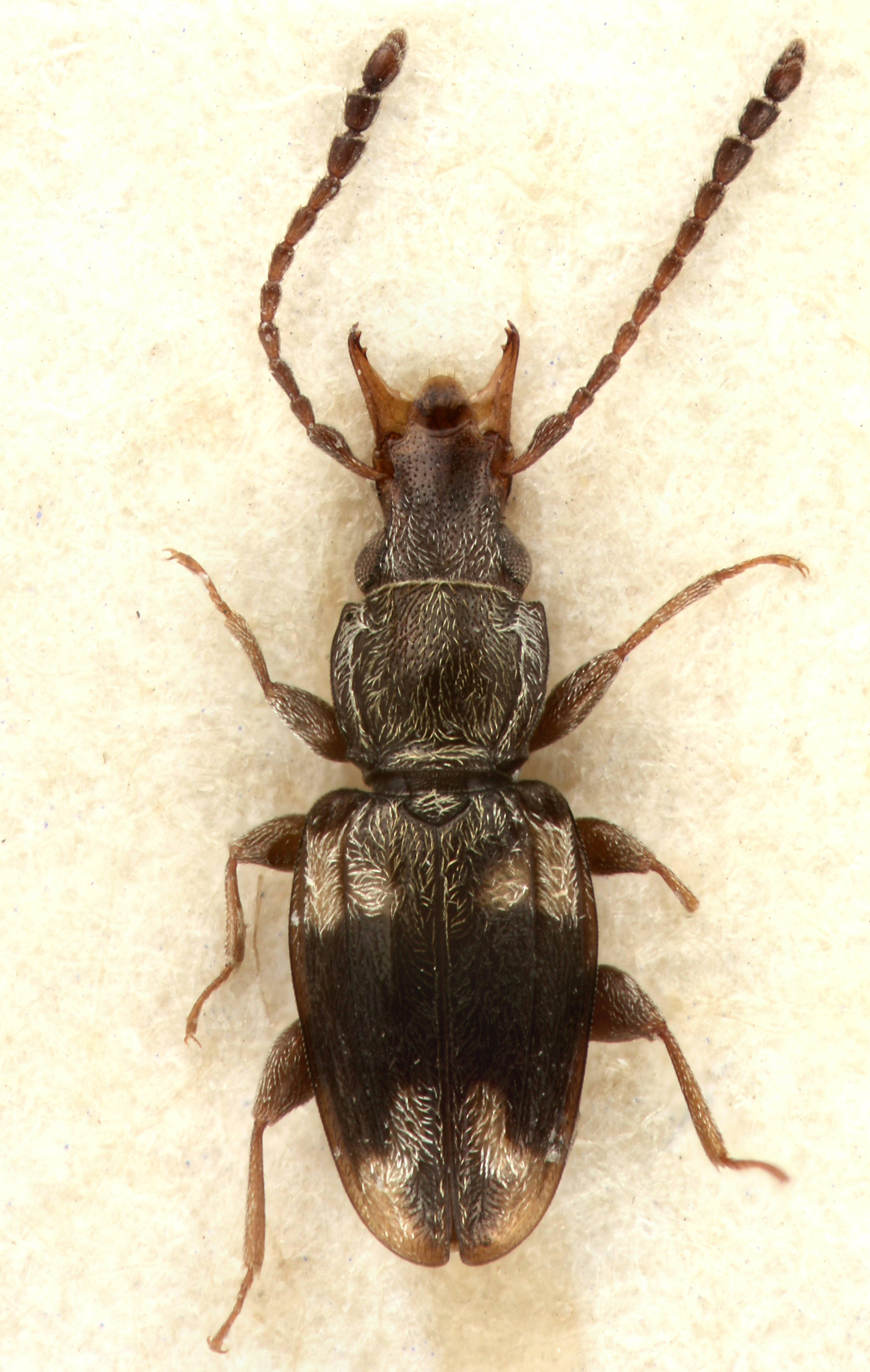
- Rhinolaemus maculatus, female

Scientific classification
- Domain: Eukaryota
- Kingdom: Animalia
- Phylum: Arthropoda
- Class: Insecta
- Order: Coleoptera
- Suborder: Polyphaga
- Infraorder: Cucujiformia
- Superfamily: Cucujoidea
- Family: Laemophloeidae
- Genus: Rhinolaemus; Steel, 1954

= Rhinolaemus =

Genus of beetles

Rhinolaemus is a genus of beetles in the family Laemophloeidae. Until recently, the genus included only Rhinolaemus maculatus, known from a single specimen collected almost 100 years ago in Fiji. A recent revision, based on newer collections, resulted in the description of a new species from Niue Island, and transferral of a third species from Laemophloeus (sens. lat.) from Fiji and other island groups.

Rhinolaemus species are moderate to large (2 mm-4 mm) dark beetles with pale fascia on the elytra, conspicuous pubescence, closed procoxal cavities, long antennae, and a more or less rostrate head. The rostrate condition is far more marked in females than in males. They are the only known rostrate laemophloeids in the Pacific region. Some specimens were collected under bark; others at light. Otherwise, nothing is known of their biology or immature stages.

Currently included species and their known distribution are:

- Rhinolaemus maculatus Steel (Fiji, Samoa)
- Rhinolaemus niueensis Thomas (Niue Island)
- Rhinolaemus tuberculatus (Grouvelle) (Fiji, Tonga, Vanuatu, and possibly Australia)

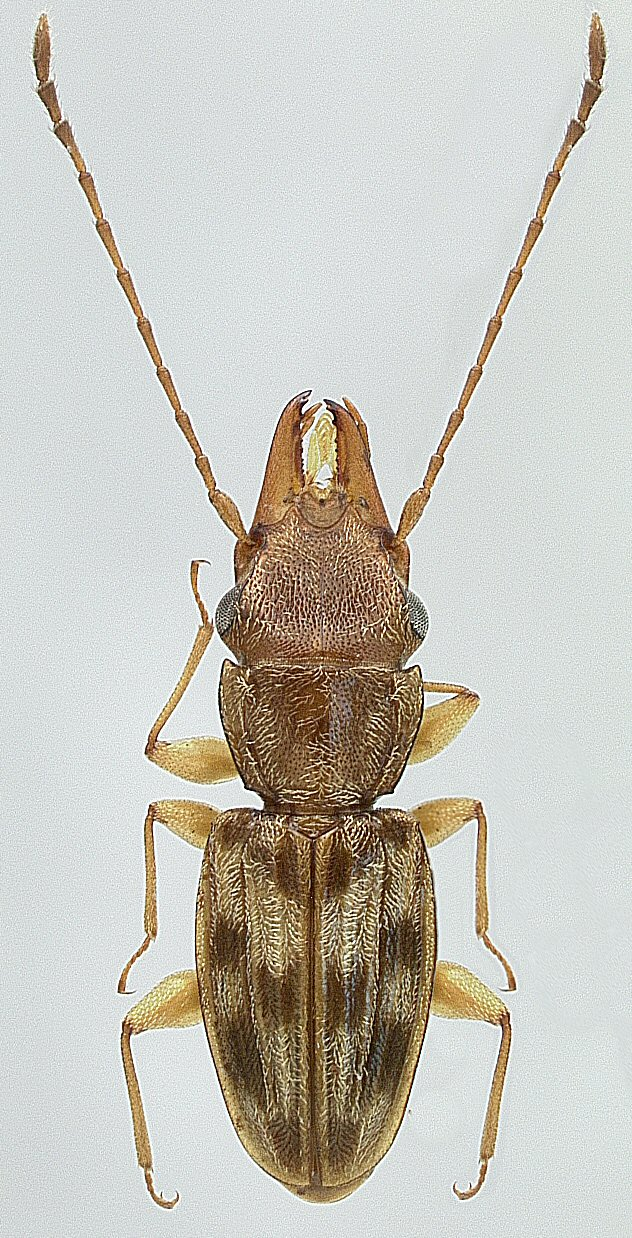
Rhinolaemus niueensis, male.

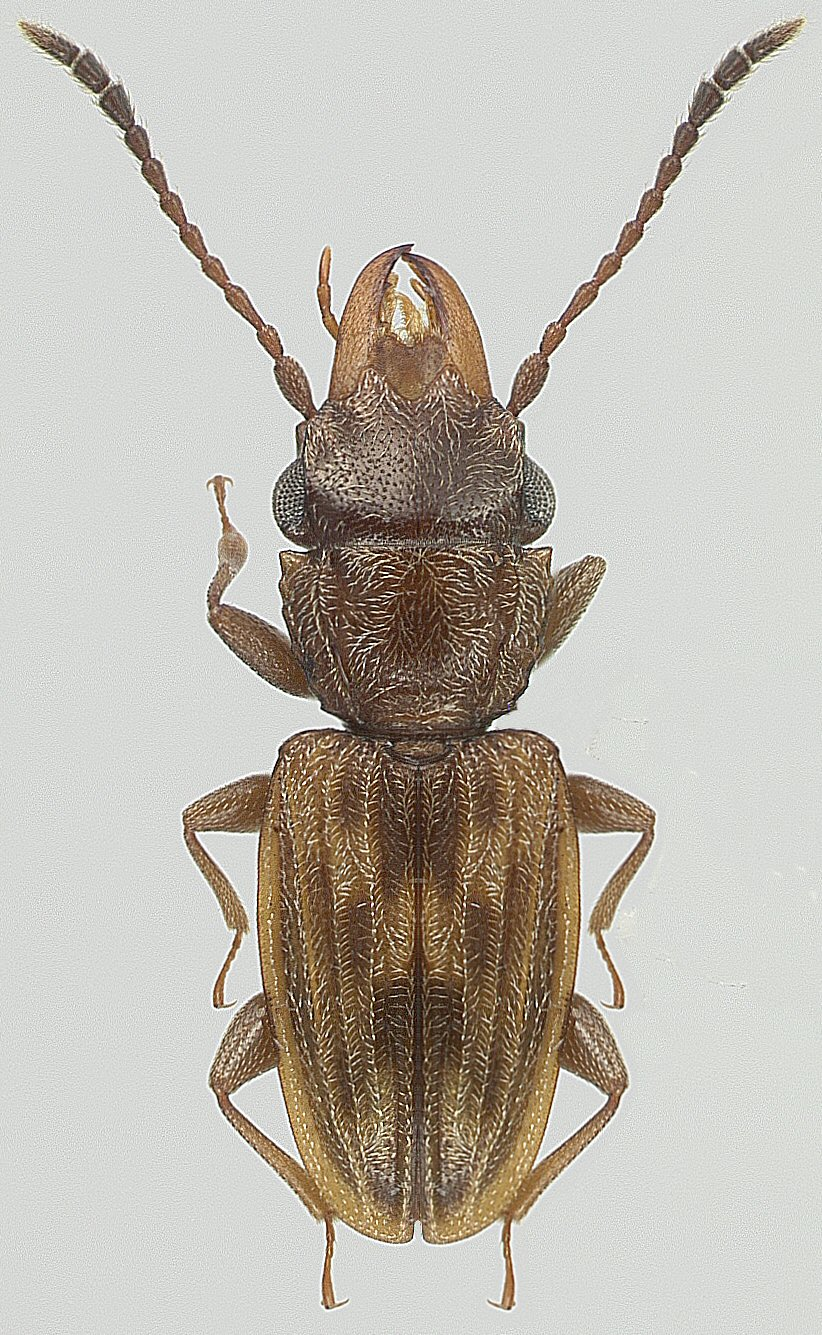
Rhinolaemus tuberculatus, male.
