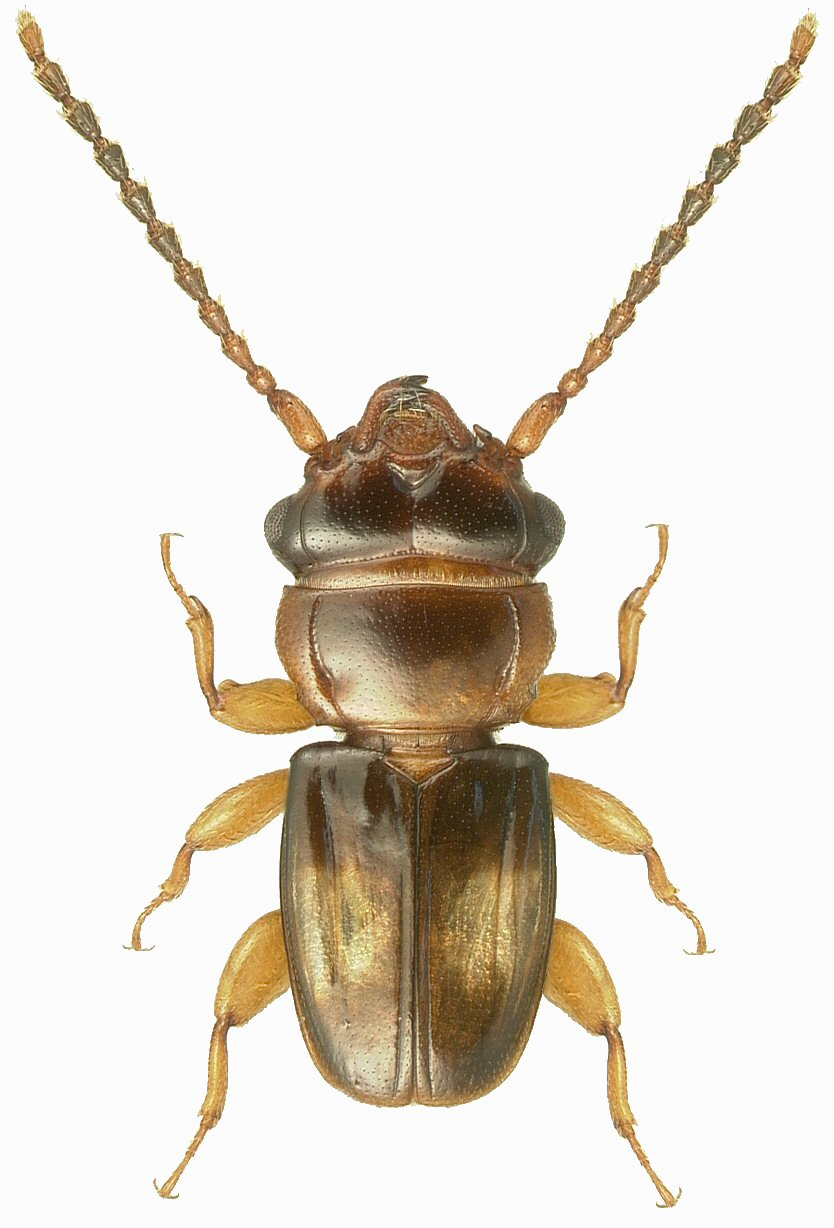
- Laemophloeus germaini

Scientific classification
- Kingdom: Animalia
- Phylum: Arthropoda
- Clade: Pancrustacea
- Class: Insecta
- Order: Coleoptera
- Suborder: Polyphaga
- Infraorder: Cucujiformia
- Superfamily: Cucujoidea
- Family: Laemophloeidae; Ganglbauer, 1899

= Laemophloeidae =

Family of beetles

Laemophloeidae, lined flat bark beetles, is a beetle family in the superfamily Cucujoidea characterized by predominantly dorso-ventrally compressed bodies, head and pronotal discs bordered by ridges or grooves, and inverted male genitalia. Size range of adults is 1–5 mm (0.04–0.2 in) in length. Currently, it contains 40 genera and about 450 species, and is represented on all continents except Antarctica; species richness is greatest in the tropics.

== Classicification ==
Historically, Laemophloeidae was treated as a subfamily of Cucujidae, but starting in the middle of the 20th century, most of what had been treated as subfamilies of the Cucujidae were considered to be families.

=== Genera ===
- Acompsophloeus Thomas, 2010
- Blubos Lefkovitch, 1962
- Brontolaemus Sharp, 1885
- Carinophloeus Lefkovitch, 1961
- Caulonomus Wollaston, 1862
- Charaphloeus Casey, 1916
- Cryptolestes Ganglbauer, 1899
- Cucujinus Arrow, 1920
- Deinophloeus Sharp, 1899
- Dysmerus Casey, 1884
- Gannes Lefkovitch, 1962
- Heterojinus Sengupta & Mukhopadhyay, 1978
- Laemophloeus Laporte de Castelnau, 1840
- Lathropus Erichson, 1845
- Lepidophloeus Thomas, 1984
- Leptophloeus Casey, 1916
- Magnoleptus Lefkovitch, 1962
- Mariolaemus Lefkovitch, 1962
- Mestolaemus Lefkovitch, 1962
- Metaxyphloeus Thomas, 1984
- Microbrontes Reitter, 1874
- Microlaemus Lefkovich, 1962
- Narthecius J.LeConte, 1861
- Nipponophloeus Sasaji, 1983
- Notolaemus Lefkovitch, 1959
- Odontophloeus Thomas, 1984
- Parandrita J.LeConte & Horn, 1880
- Paraphloeolaemus Thomas, 2018
- Passandrophloeus Kessel, 1921
- Phloeipsius Casey, 1916
- Phloeolaemus Casey, 1916
- Placonotus MacLeay, 1871
- Planolestes Lefkovitch, 1958
- Pseudophloeus Yablokov-Khnzoryan, 1977
- Rhabdophloeus Sharp, 1899
- Rhinolaemus Steel, 1954
- Rhinomalus Gemm, 1870
- Rhinophloeus Sharp, 1899
- Sinuatophloeus Kessel, 1921
- Xylolestes Lefkovitch, 1962
- Xylophloeus Lefkovitch, 1962

== Habitat and behaviour ==
Most laemophloeids, adults and larvae, are found under bark of dead trees, where they apparently are primarily fungivores, although some genera with adults having subcylindrical bodies (e.g., Leptophloeus, Dysmerus) occur in the galleries of bark beetles (Curculionidae: Scolytinae), upon which they may feed. A few genera, but most particularly Cryptolestes, contain some species that are pests of stored grain products. The most important of these are Cryptolestes ferrugineus (Stephens), Cryptolestes pusillus (Schönherr), and Cryptolestes turcicus (Grouvelle).

== Characteristics ==
Several genera exhibit unusual modifications to male antennae (especially Cryptolestes, Dysmerus, and Microbrontes), with the scape expanded into hook-like or blade-like structures. Several other genera (Rhinomalus, Rhinophloeus, and Metaxyphloeus) related to Laemophloeus are atypical in that the adults are rostrate to varying degrees. Photographs of most world genera are available at the Florida State Collection of Arthropod website, with most North American species pictured.

== Jumping larvae ==
A PLOS ONE article by Bergquist et al. (2022) reported that when the Laemophloeidae larvae are in the open, they will straighten themselves out and jump curling up into a ball in the process and can bounce upon impact when they are curled up.

== Gallery ==
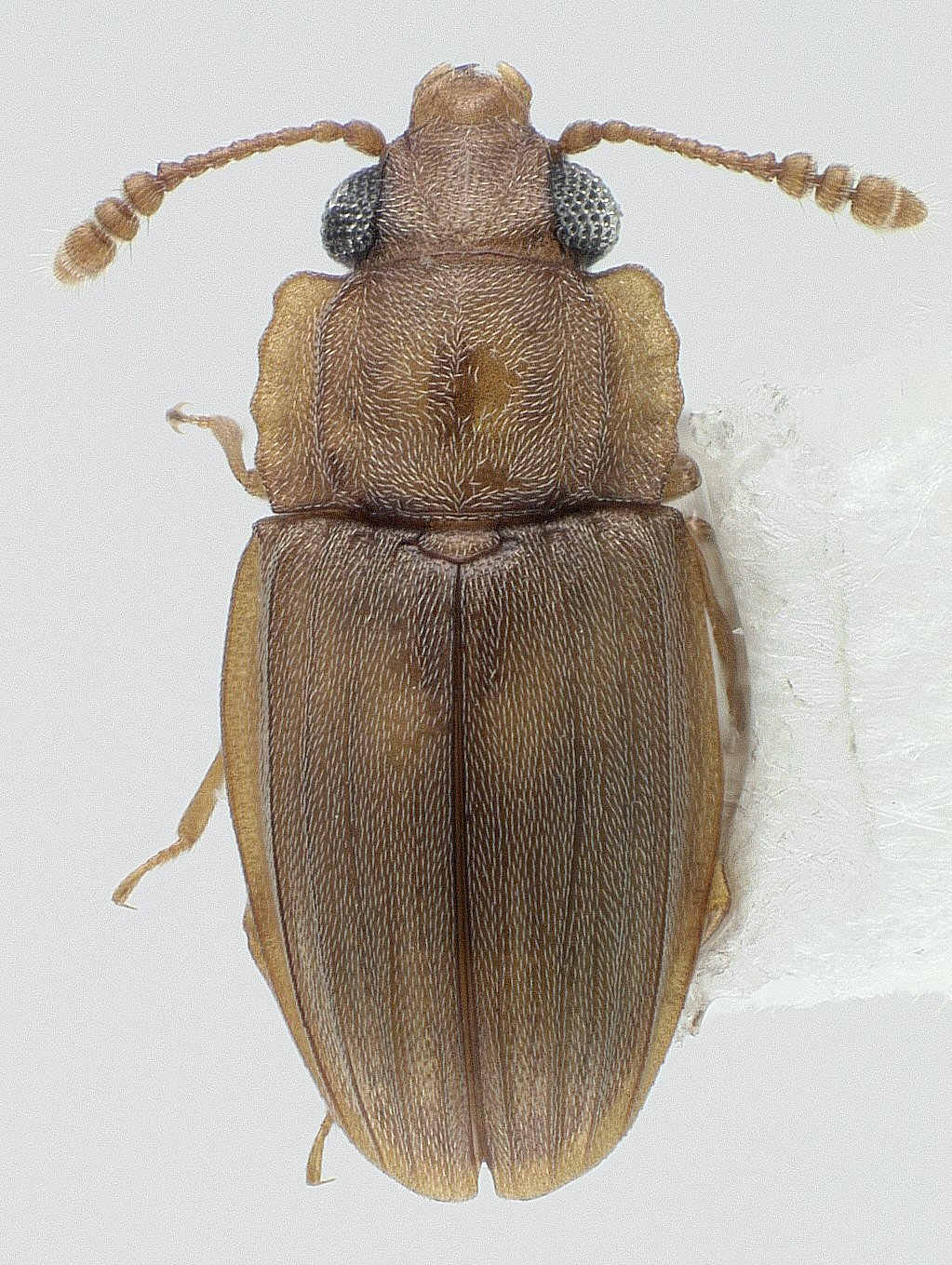
Odontophloeus sp.

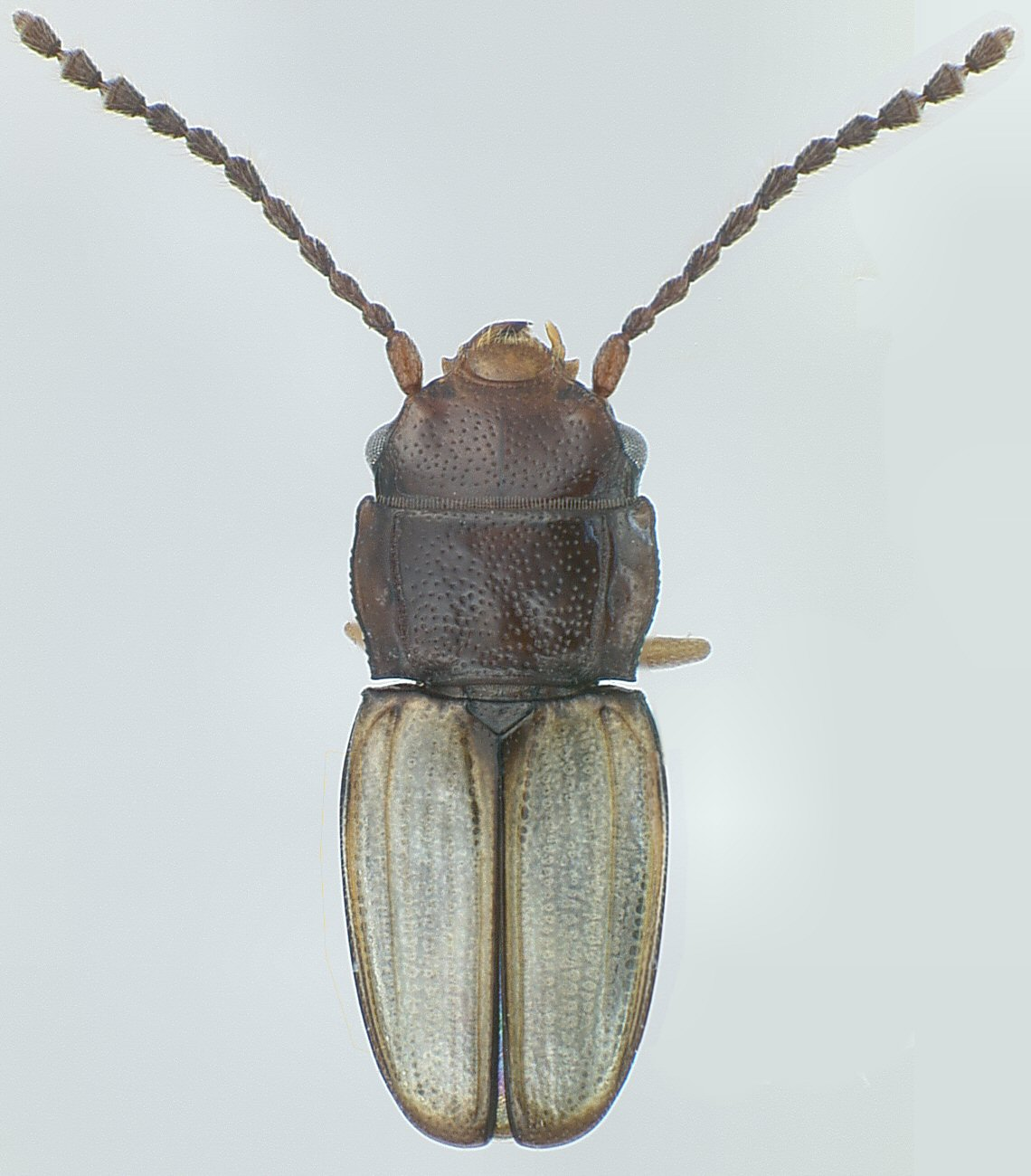
Phloeolaemus hoplites.

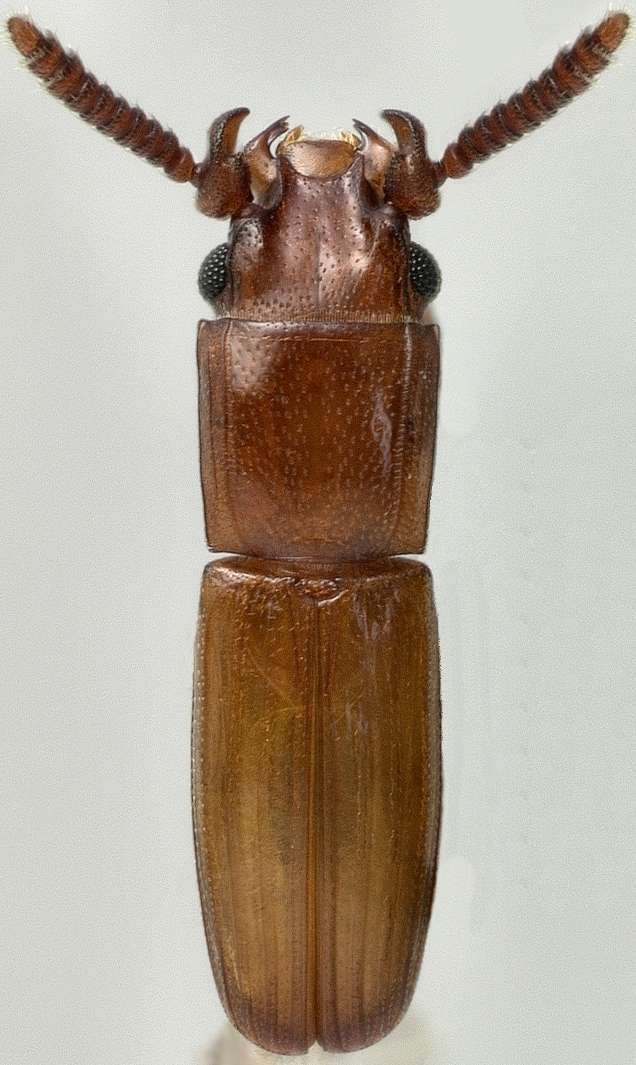
Dysmerus symphilus.

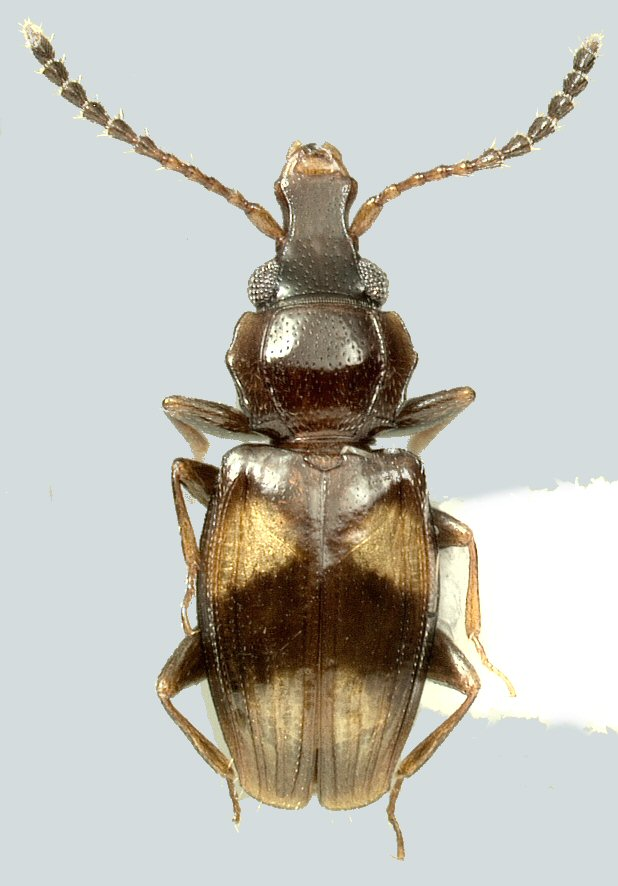
Metaxyphloeus germaini.

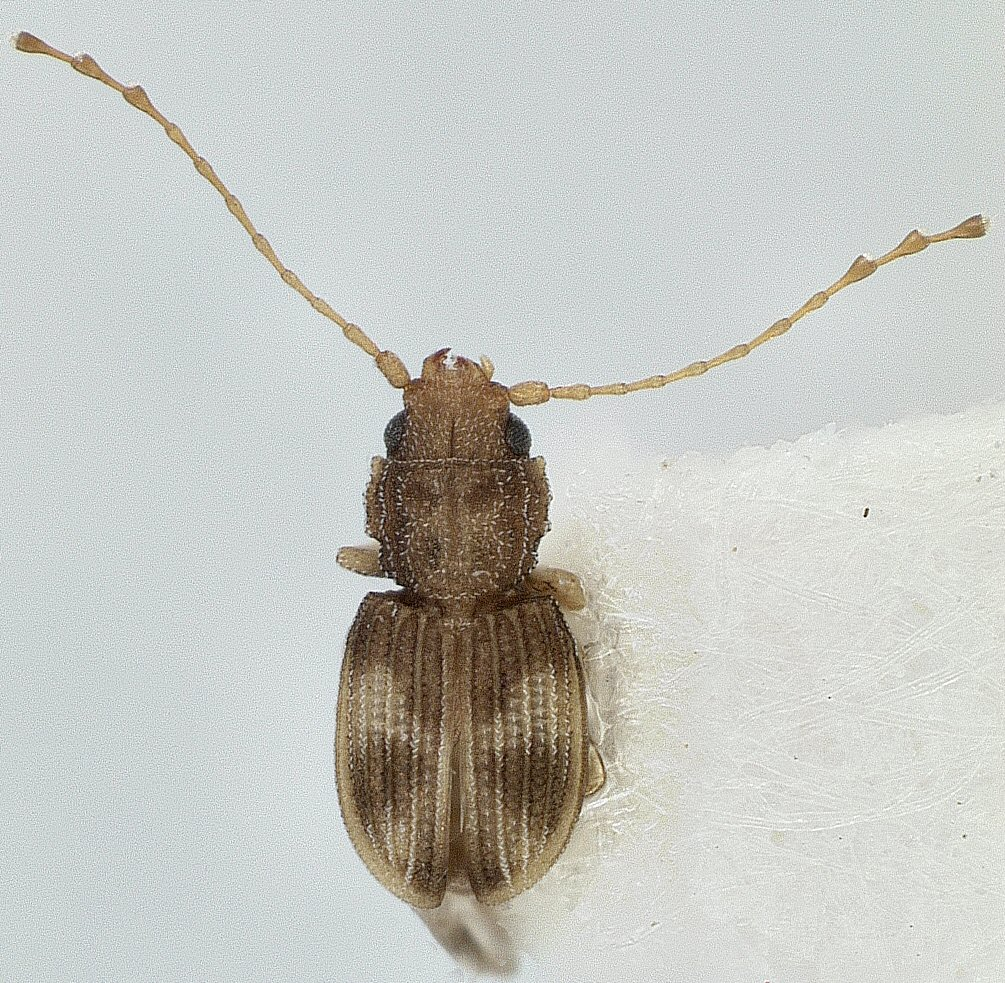
Lepidophloeus exquisitus.
