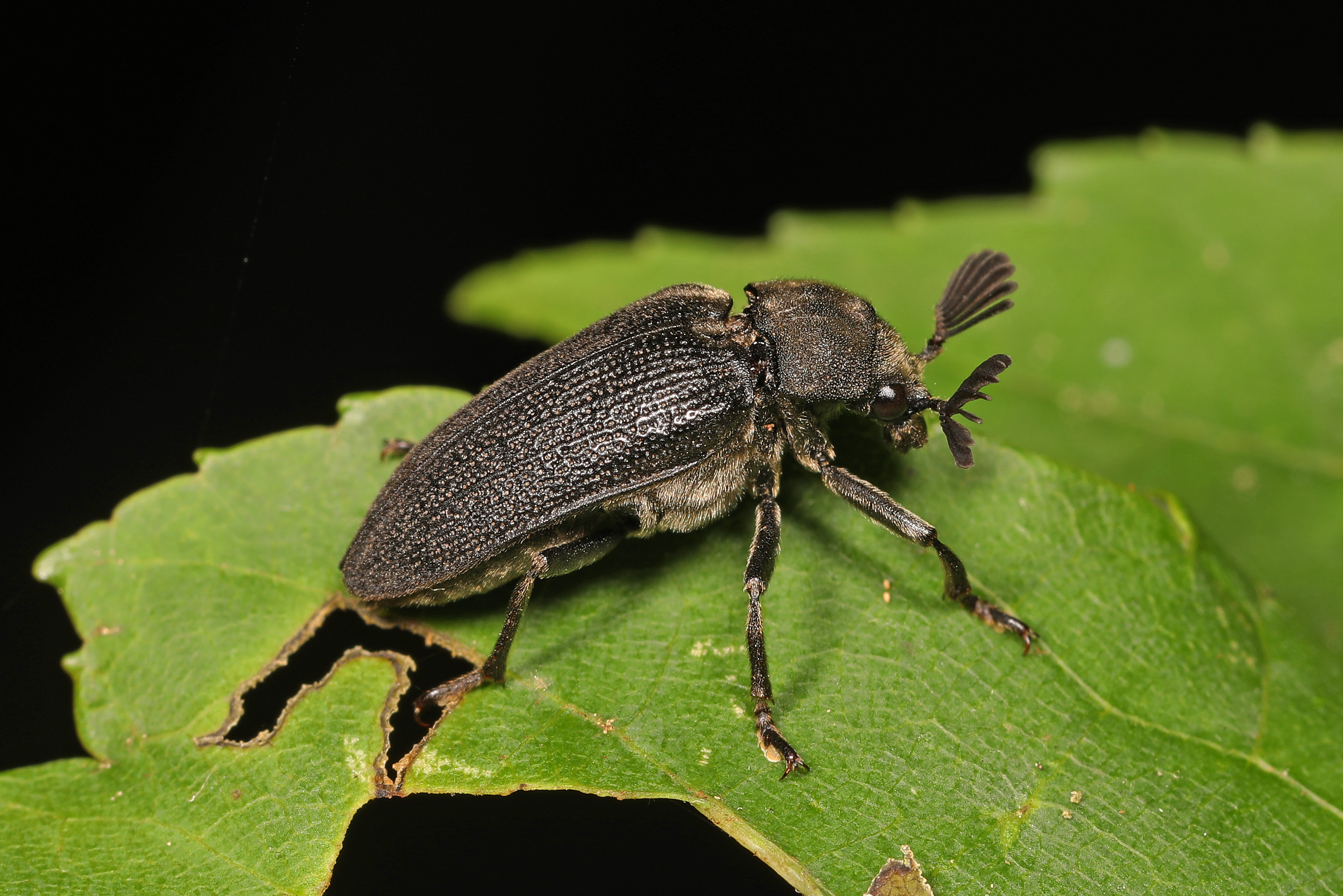

Scientific classification
- Domain: Eukaryota
- Kingdom: Animalia
- Phylum: Arthropoda
- Class: Insecta
- Order: Coleoptera
- Suborder: Polyphaga
- Infraorder: Elateriformia
- Family: Rhipiceridae
- Genus: Sandalus
- Species: S. petrophya

Binomial name
- Sandalus petrophya Knoch, 1801

= Sandalus petrophya =

Species of beetle

Sandalus petrophya, the cedar beetle, is a species of cicada parasite beetle in the family Rhipiceridae. It is found in North America. Although similar in appearance to Sandalus niger, this species has a distinct vertical ridge in the middle of its pronotum.
