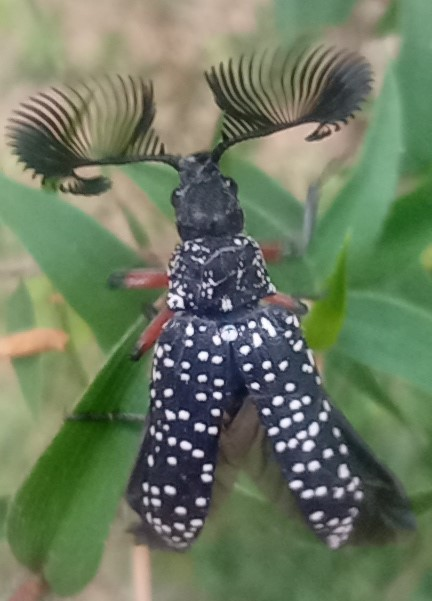

Scientific classification
- Kingdom: Animalia
- Phylum: Arthropoda
- Class: Insecta
- Order: Coleoptera
- Suborder: Polyphaga
- Infraorder: Elateriformia
- Family: Rhipiceridae
- Genus: Rhipicera
- Species: R. femorata

Binomial name
- Rhipicera femorata Kirby, 1819

Synonyms
- Rhipicera neglecta van Emden, 1925; Rhipicera vicina Pic, 1925

= Rhipicera femorata =

Species of beetle

Rhipicera femorata is a species of beetle in the genus Rhipicera.

== Distribution ==
Rhipicera femorata has been collected along the eastern coast of Australia, from Tasmania to southern Queensland and South Australia, on sandy swamplands and immediate environs, which include sedges, grasses and other swampy land trees.
