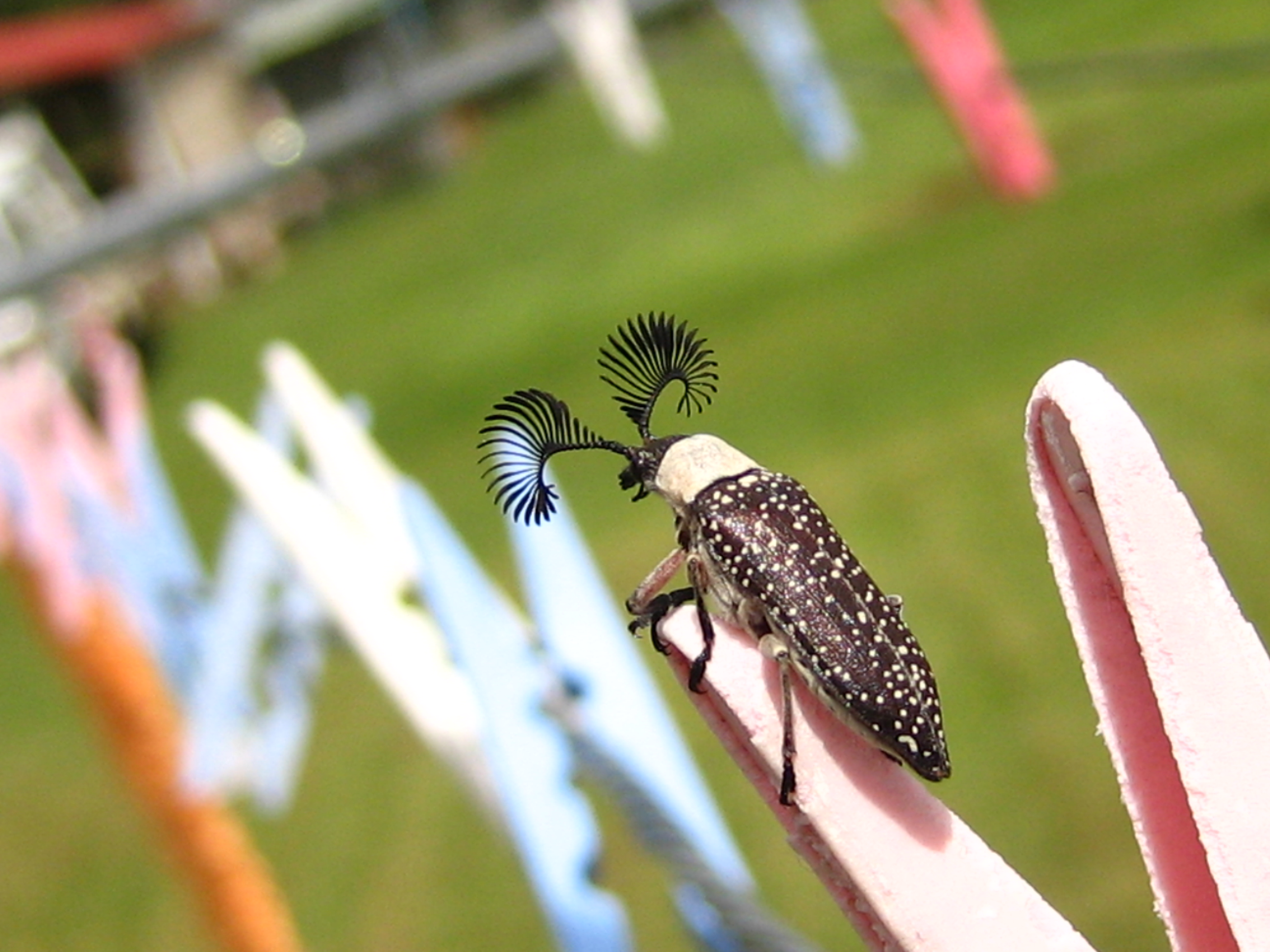

Scientific classification
- Kingdom: Animalia
- Phylum: Arthropoda
- Class: Insecta
- Order: Coleoptera
- Suborder: Polyphaga
- Infraorder: Elateriformia
- Family: Rhipiceridae
- Genus: Rhipicera
- Species: R. mystacina

Binomial name
- Rhipicera mystacina Fabricius, 1775

= Rhipicera mystacina =

Species of beetle

Rhipicera mystacina is a species of beetle in the genus Rhipicera.

== Description ==
Rhipicera mystacina is distinguished from related species by the reddish brown colour and the dense and white adpressed setae covering most of the pronotum.

== Distribution ==
Rhipicera mystacina can be found in the northern and central parts of Queensland.
