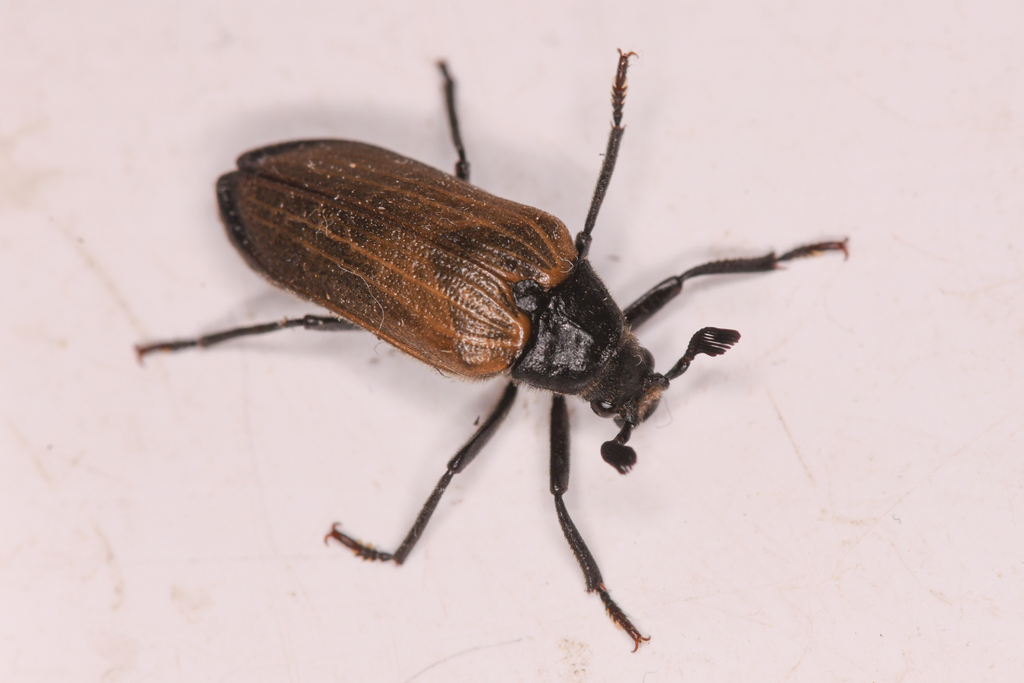

Scientific classification
- Kingdom: Animalia
- Phylum: Arthropoda
- Class: Insecta
- Order: Coleoptera
- Suborder: Polyphaga
- Infraorder: Elateriformia
- Family: Rhipiceridae
- Genus: Sandalus
- Species: S. californicus

Binomial name
- Sandalus californicus LeConte, 1861

= Sandalus californicus =

Species of beetle

Sandalus californicus is a species of cicada parasite beetle in the family Rhipiceridae. It is found in North America.
