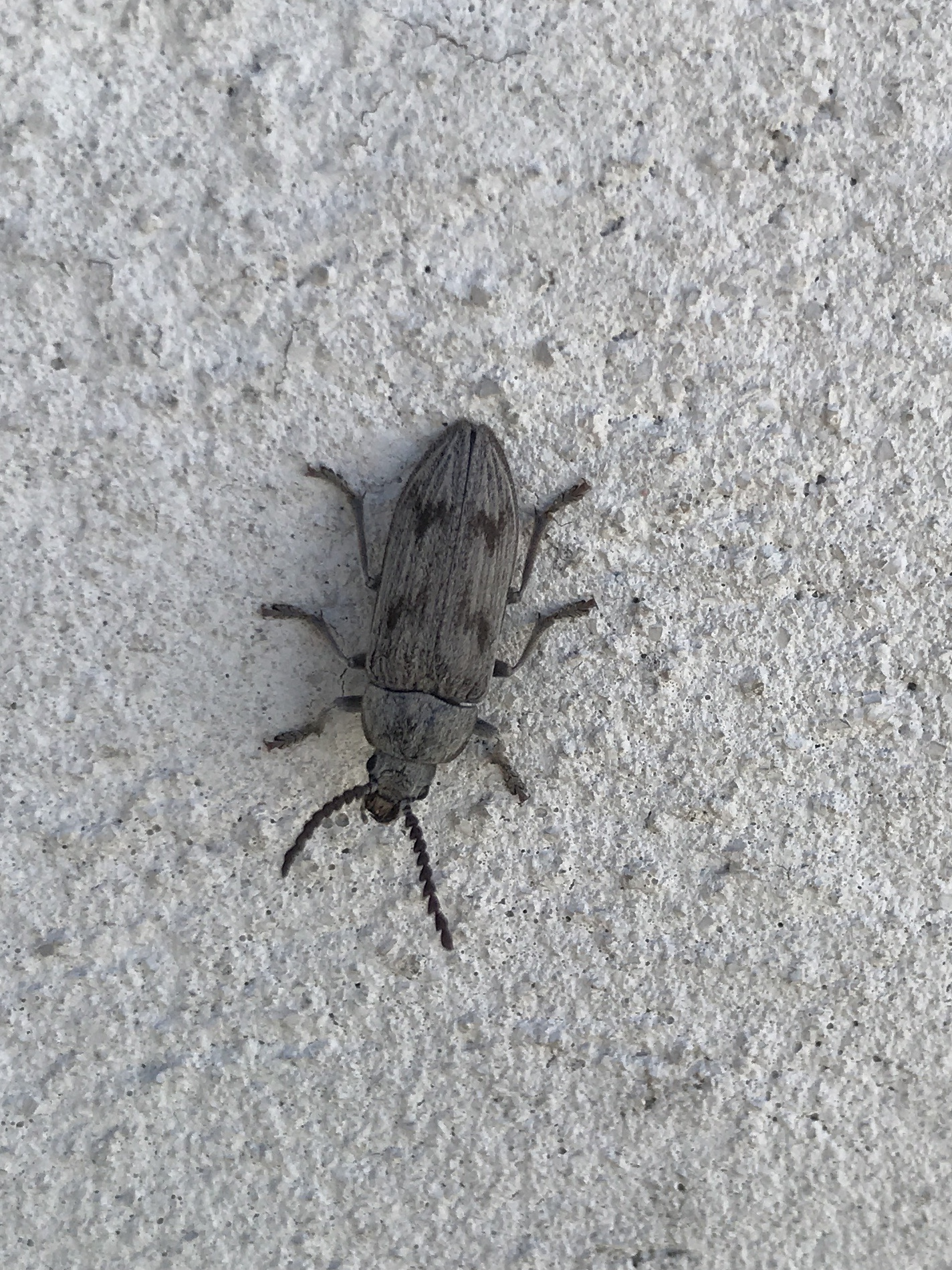

Scientific classification
- Domain: Eukaryota
- Kingdom: Animalia
- Phylum: Arthropoda
- Class: Insecta
- Order: Coleoptera
- Suborder: Polyphaga
- Infraorder: Elateriformia
- Family: Dascillidae
- Genus: Dascillus
- Species: D. davidsoni

Binomial name
- Dascillus davidsoni (LeConte, 1859)

= Dascillus davidsoni =

Species of beetle

Dascillus davidsoni is a species of soft-bodied plant beetle in the family Dascillidae. It is found in North America.
