= Sandalus porosus =

Scientific classification
- Domain: Eukaryota
- Kingdom: Animalia
- Phylum: Arthropoda
- Class: Insecta
- Order: Coleoptera
- Suborder: Polyphaga
- Infraorder: Elateriformia
- Family: Rhipiceridae
- Genus: Sandalus
- Species: S. porosus

Binomial name
- Sandalus porosus LeConte, 1868

Species of beetle

Sandalus porosus is a species of cicada parasite beetle in the family Rhipiceridae. It is found in North America.
