= Anorus parvicollis =

Scientific classification
- Domain: Eukaryota
- Kingdom: Animalia
- Phylum: Arthropoda
- Class: Insecta
- Order: Coleoptera
- Suborder: Polyphaga
- Infraorder: Elateriformia
- Family: Dascillidae
- Genus: Anorus
- Species: A. parvicollis

Binomial name
- Anorus parvicollis Horn, 1894

Species of beetle

Anorus parvicollis is a species of soft-bodied plant beetle in the family Dascillidae. It is found in North America.
