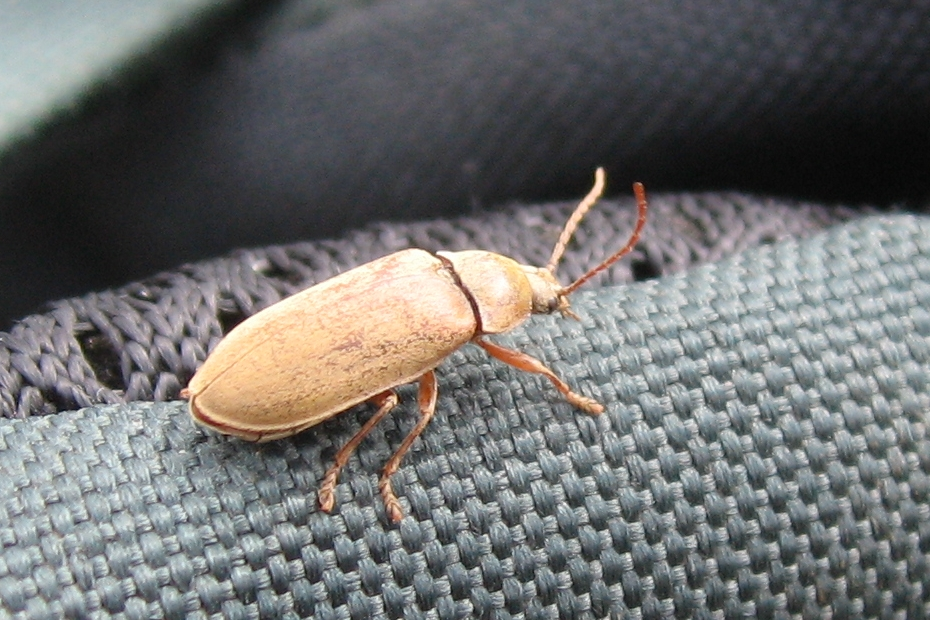
- Dascillus cervinus

Scientific classification
- Kingdom: Animalia
- Phylum: Arthropoda
- Clade: Pancrustacea
- Class: Insecta
- Order: Coleoptera
- Suborder: Polyphaga
- Infraorder: Elateriformia
- Superfamily: Dascilloidea; Guérin-Méneville, 1843

Families
- Dascillidae; Rhipiceridae

= Dascilloidea =

Superfamily of beetles

Dascilloidea is a superfamily of polyphagan beetles, comprising two families: Dascillidae (soft bodied plant beetles) and Rhipiceridae (cicada beetle and cicada parasite beetles).
