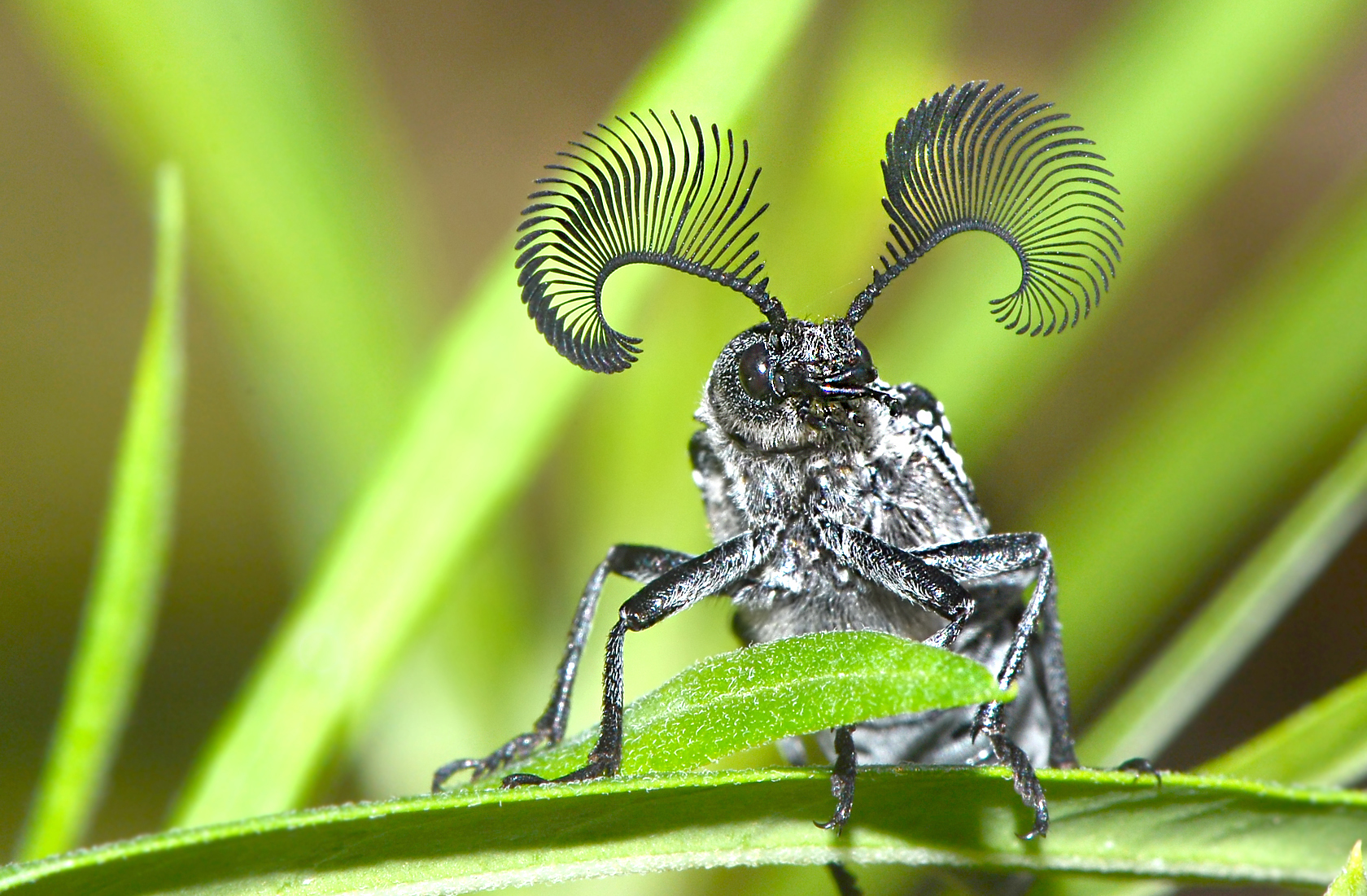

Scientific classification
- Domain: Eukaryota
- Kingdom: Animalia
- Phylum: Arthropoda
- Class: Insecta
- Order: Coleoptera
- Suborder: Polyphaga
- Infraorder: Elateriformia
- Family: Rhipiceridae
- Genus: Rhipicera
- Species: R. carinata

Binomial name
- Rhipicera carinata Lin et al., 2013

= Rhipicera carinata =

Species of beetle

Rhipicera carinata is a species of beetle in the genus Rhipicera.

== Taxonomic History ==
This species was first described in 2013. The species epithet has been derived from the Latin "carinatus", keel shaped, in reference to the median longitudinal frontal carina. R. carinata closely resembles R. reichei but differs in the black femora and vertex usually bearing longitudinal ridge.

== Distribution ==
It is widely distributed and common in Western Australia and less common in South Australia.

== Gallery ==
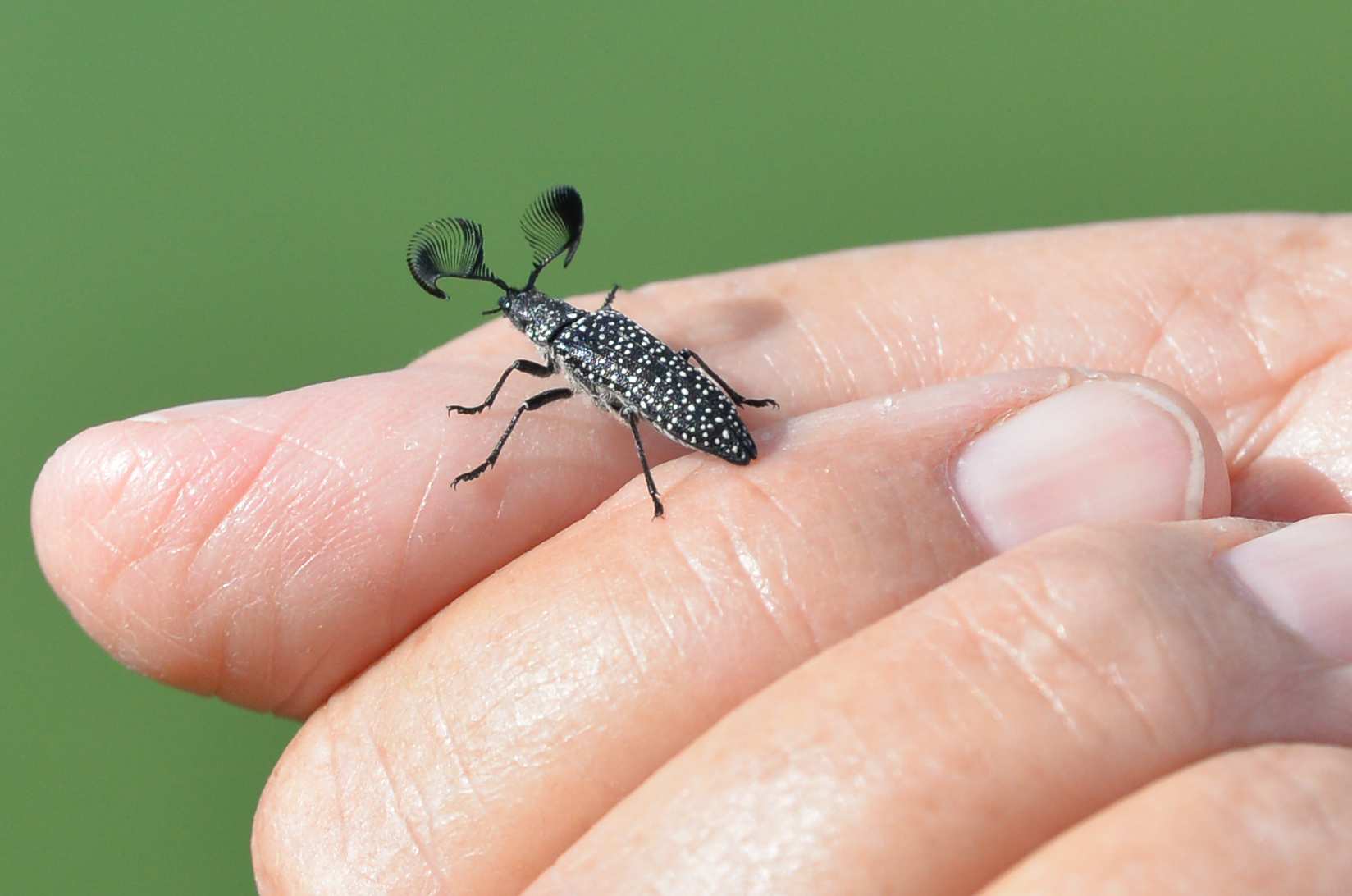

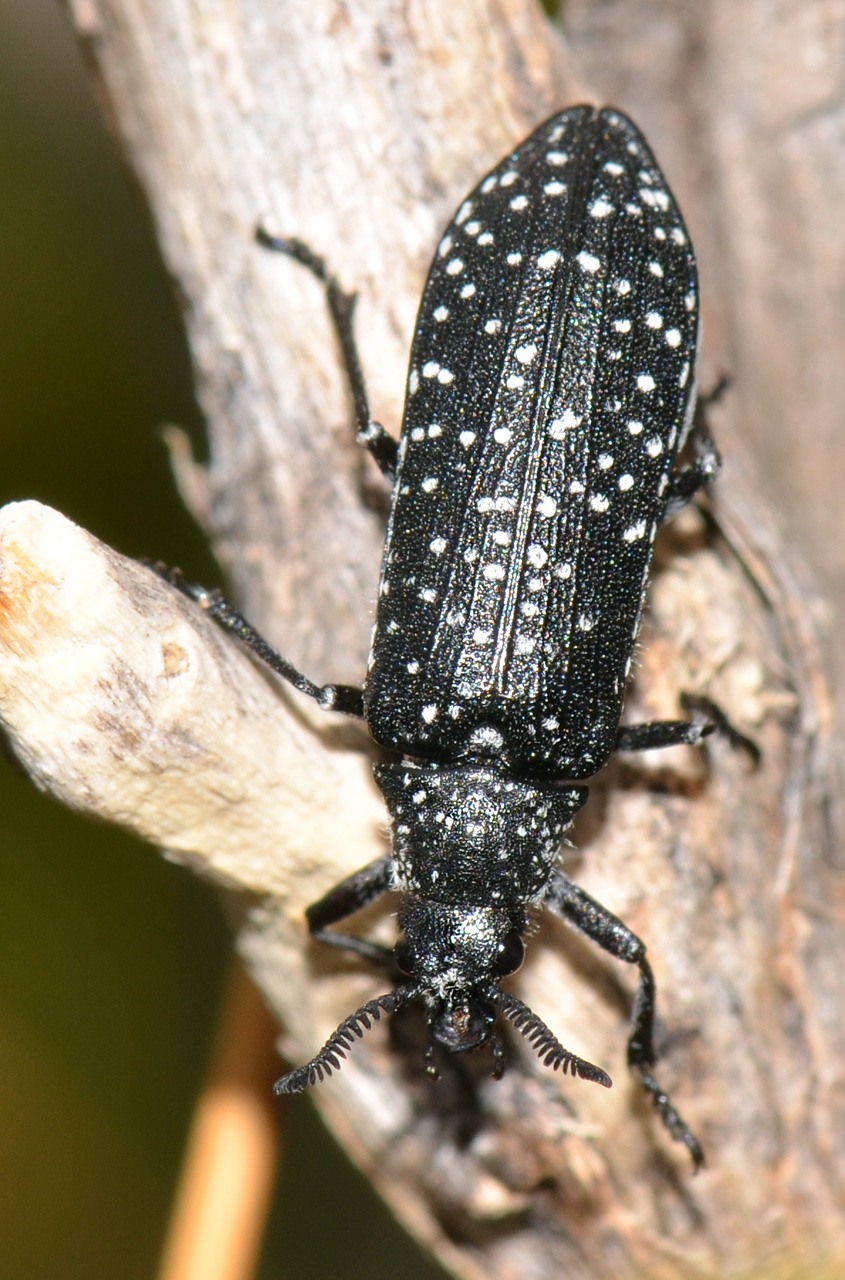

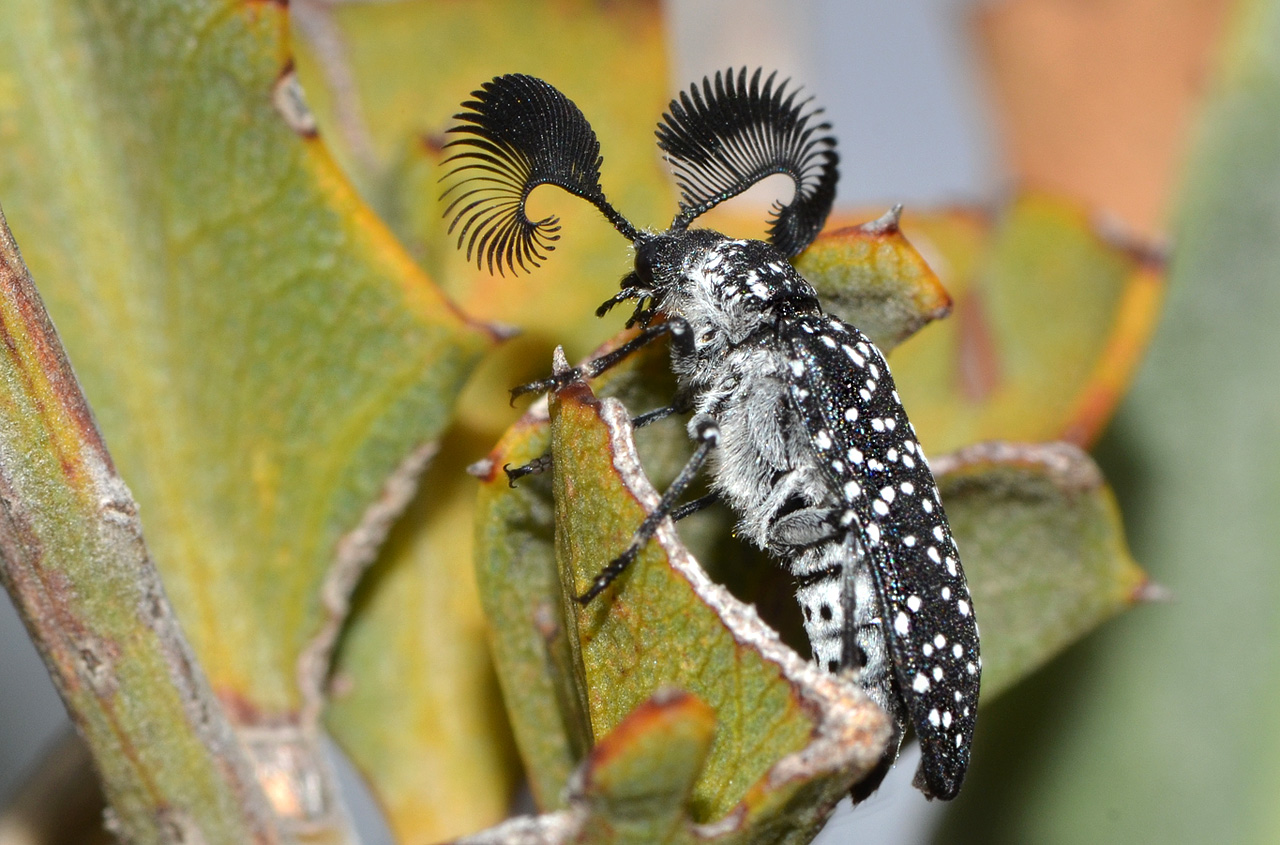

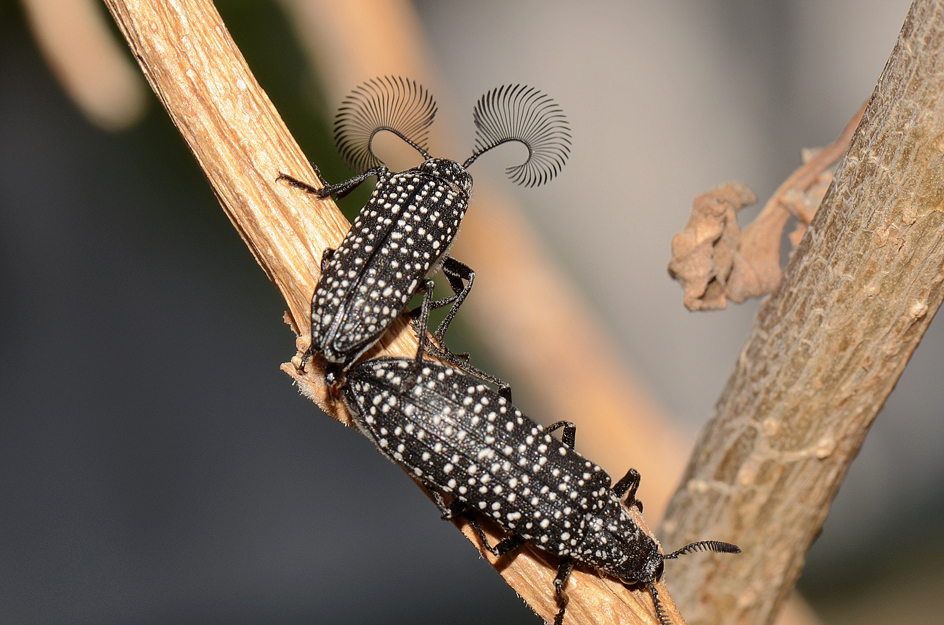

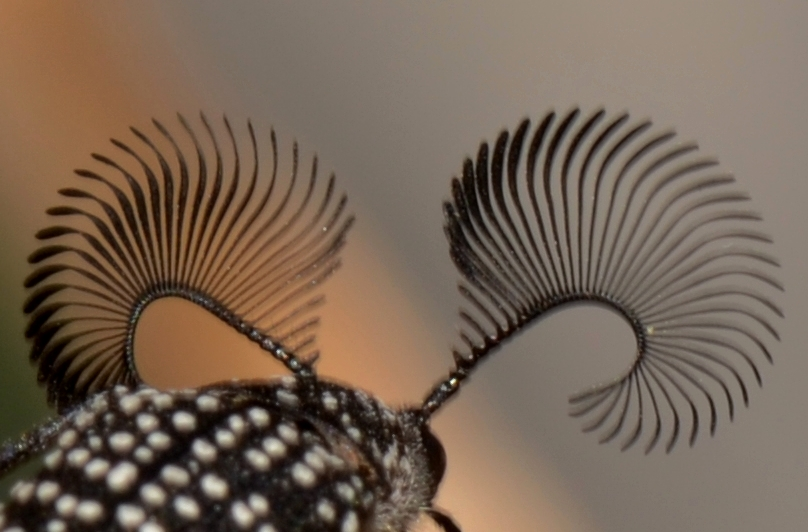
antennae

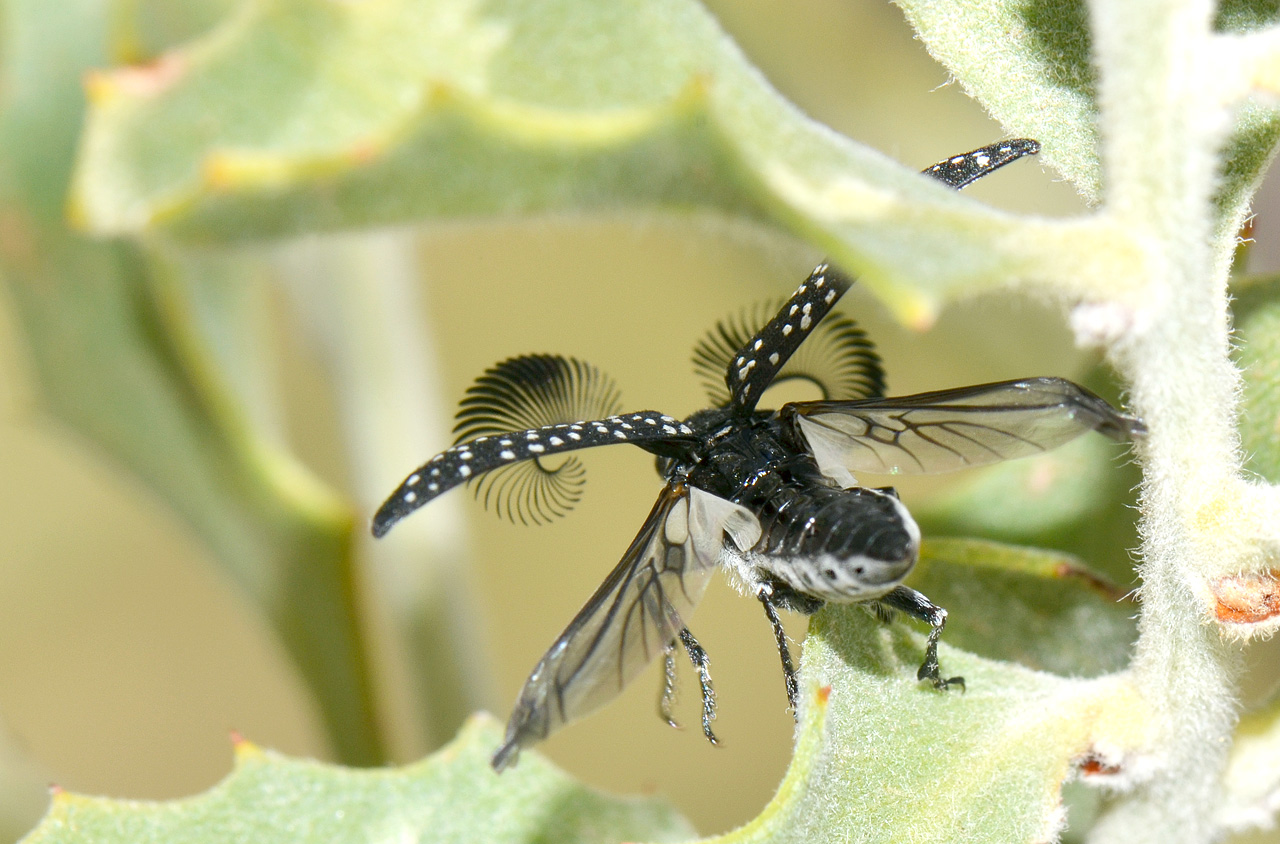
Beginning flight
