= Anorus =

Scientific classification
- Kingdom: Animalia
- Phylum: Arthropoda
- Class: Insecta
- Order: Coleoptera
- Suborder: Polyphaga
- Infraorder: Elateriformia
- Family: Dascillidae
- Genus: Anorus; LeConte, 1859

Genus of beetles

Anorus is a genus of soft-bodied plant beetles in the family Dascillidae. There are at least three described species in Anorus.

== Species ==
These three species belong to the genus Anorus:

- Anorus arizonicus Blaisdell, 1934
- Anorus parvicollis Horn, 1894
- Anorus piceus LeConte, 1859
