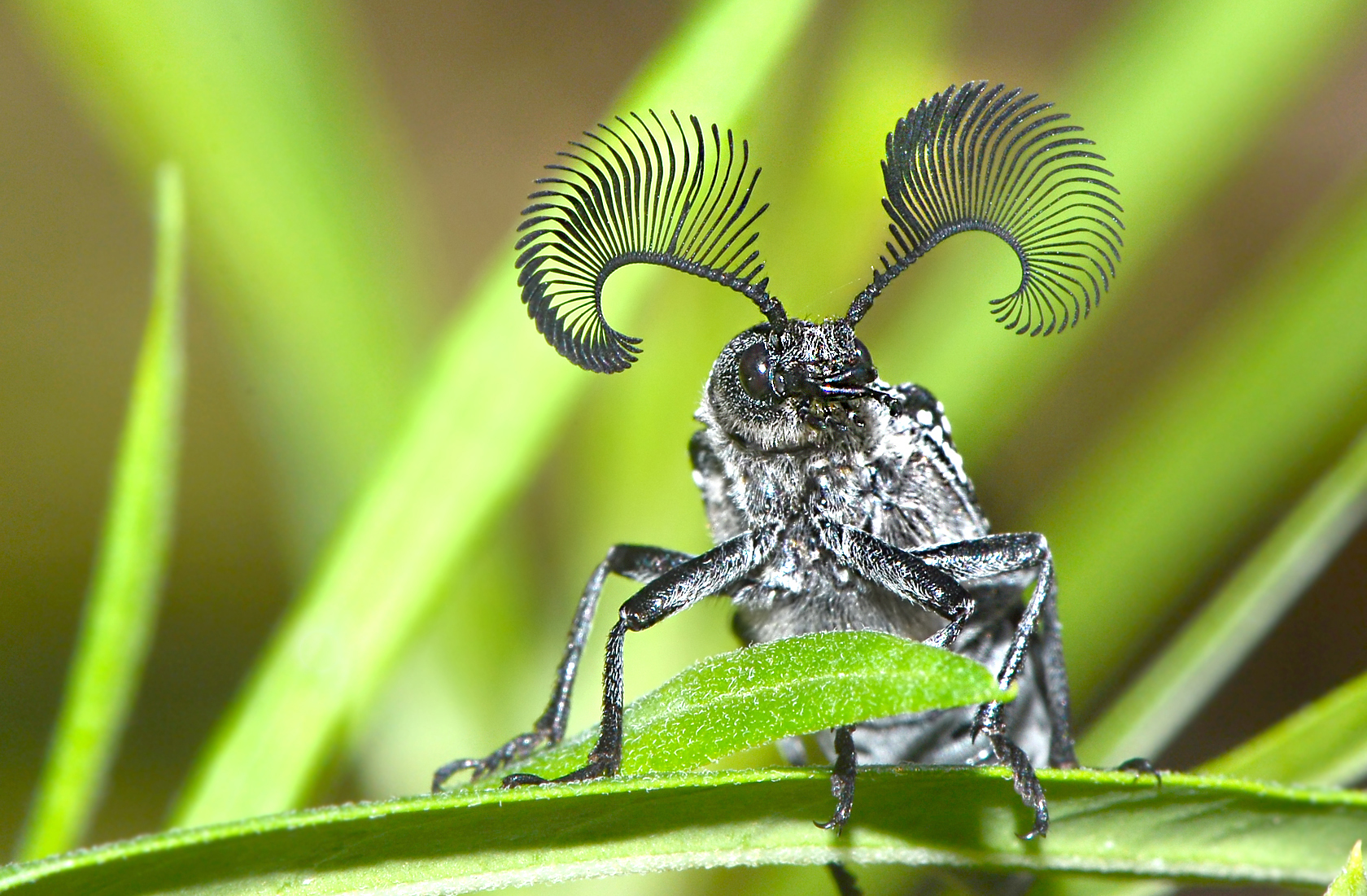
- Rhipicera carinata

Scientific classification
- Kingdom: Animalia
- Phylum: Arthropoda
- Clade: Pancrustacea
- Class: Insecta
- Order: Coleoptera
- Suborder: Polyphaga
- Infraorder: Elateriformia
- Family: Rhipiceridae
- Genus: Rhipicera; Latreille, 1817

Synonyms
- Polytomus Dalman, 1819; Polystomus Berthold, 1827 (Missp.); Agathorhipis Guérin-Méneville, 1843; Rhipidocera Agassiz, 1846 (Emend.); Rhipidicera Gistl, 1848 (Missp.)

= Rhipicera =

Genus of beetles

Rhipicera is a genus of beetle belonging to the family Rhipiceridae. The larvae are parasitoids of cicadas.

The sexual dimorphism between male and female beetles in the genus Rhipicera has been attributed to using scent in mating behaviors. The antennae of males and females differ in that the males have lamellate antennae while the females' antennae are significantly smaller in comparison. It is thought that the males use their lamellate antennae, more specifically, the sensilla placodea, to detect pheromones that are produced by females. This is suggested by certain mating behaviors, such as distinct flying patterns that have been seen in other species that rely on pheromone tracking. Additionally, there have been observations of multiple adult males trying to mate with a singular female, which is seen in other species and this further supports that pheromones are used to help facilitate mating behaviors.

== Species ==
All five species of the genus Rhipicera are closely related based on their morphological characters.

- Rhipicera attenuata Westwood 1843; Western Australia
- Rhipicera carinata Jin et al., 2013; Western Australia
- Rhipicera femorata Kirby 1818; Eastern coast from southern Queensland to South Australia and Tasmania
- Rhipicera mystacina (Fabricius, 1775); Queensland
- Rhipicera reichei Guerin-Meneville, 1843; Queensland

== Gallery ==
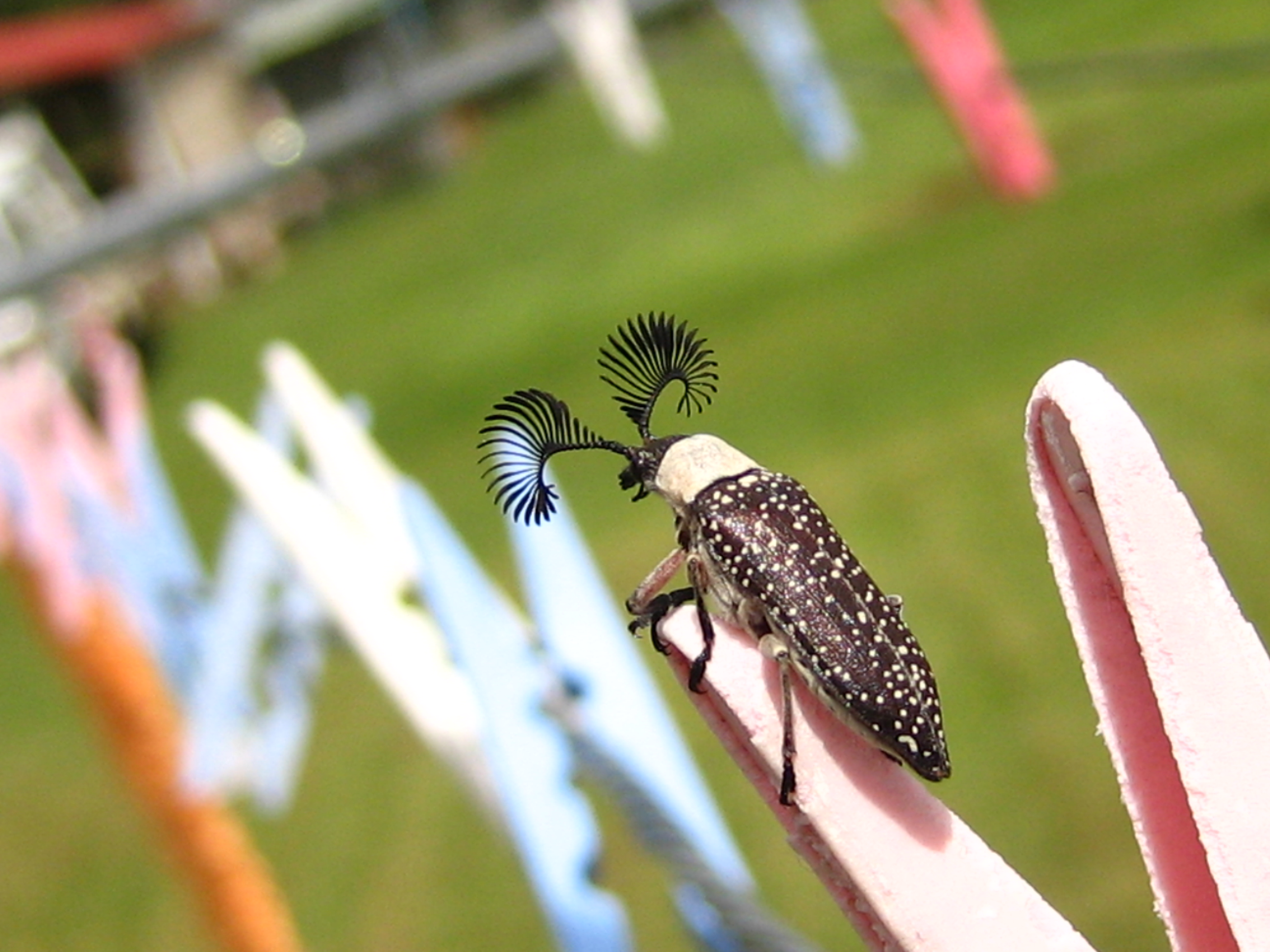
Rhipicera mystacina

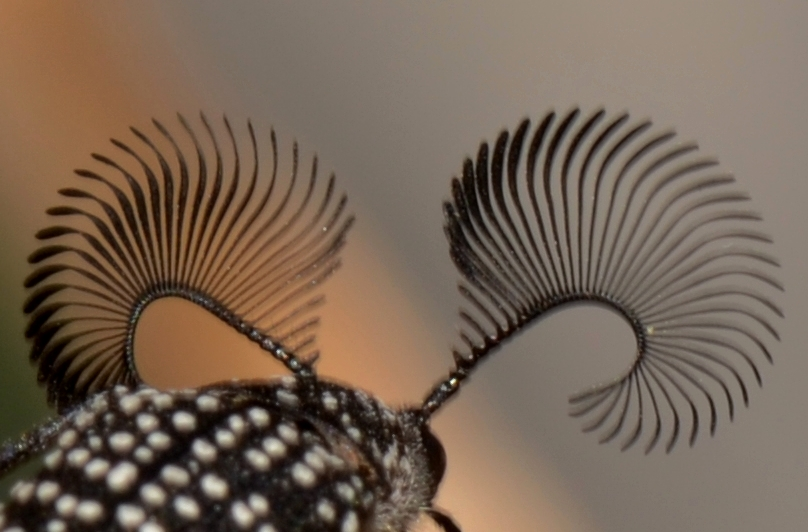
Rhipicera carinata - male antennae

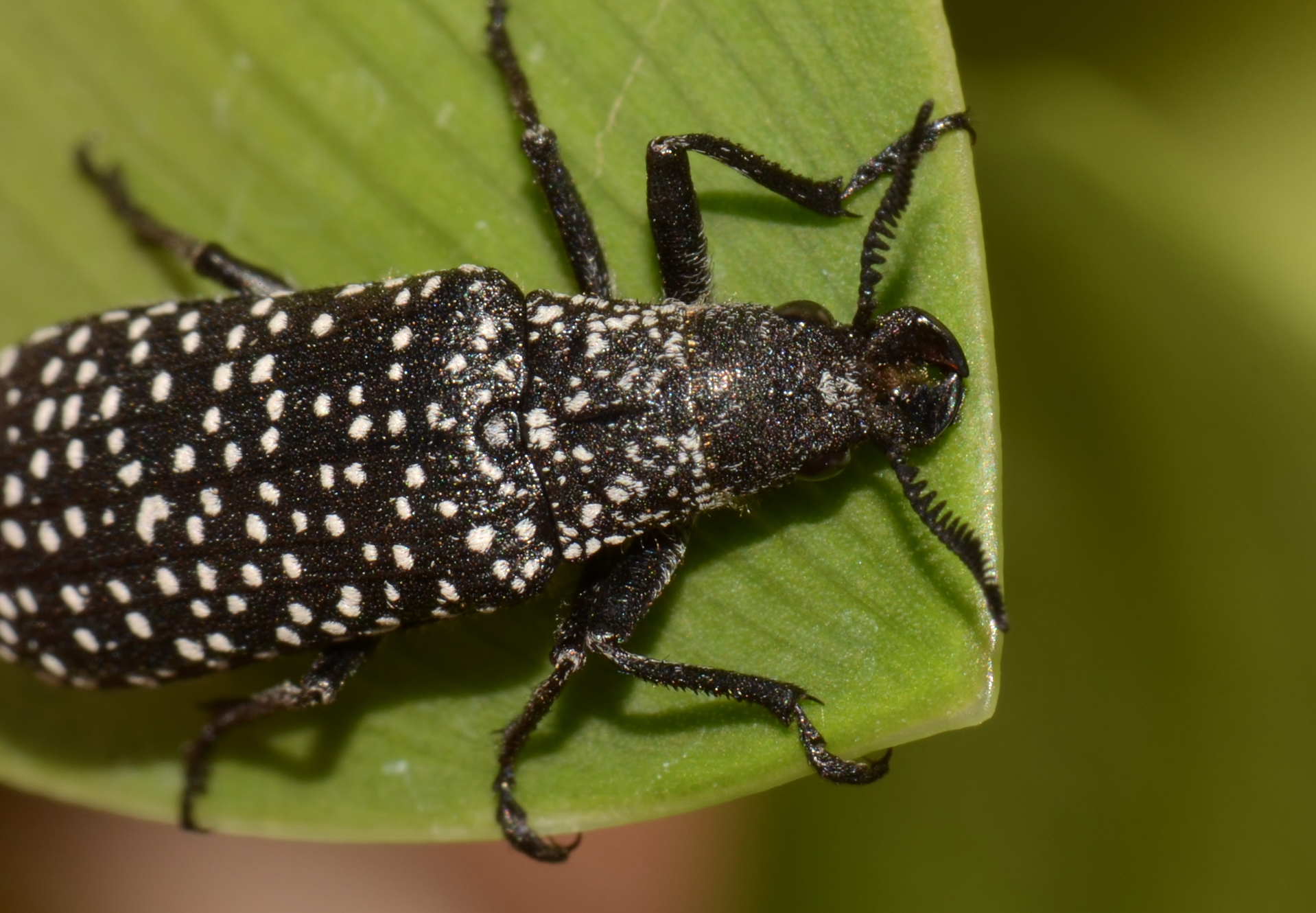
Rhipicera carinata - Female

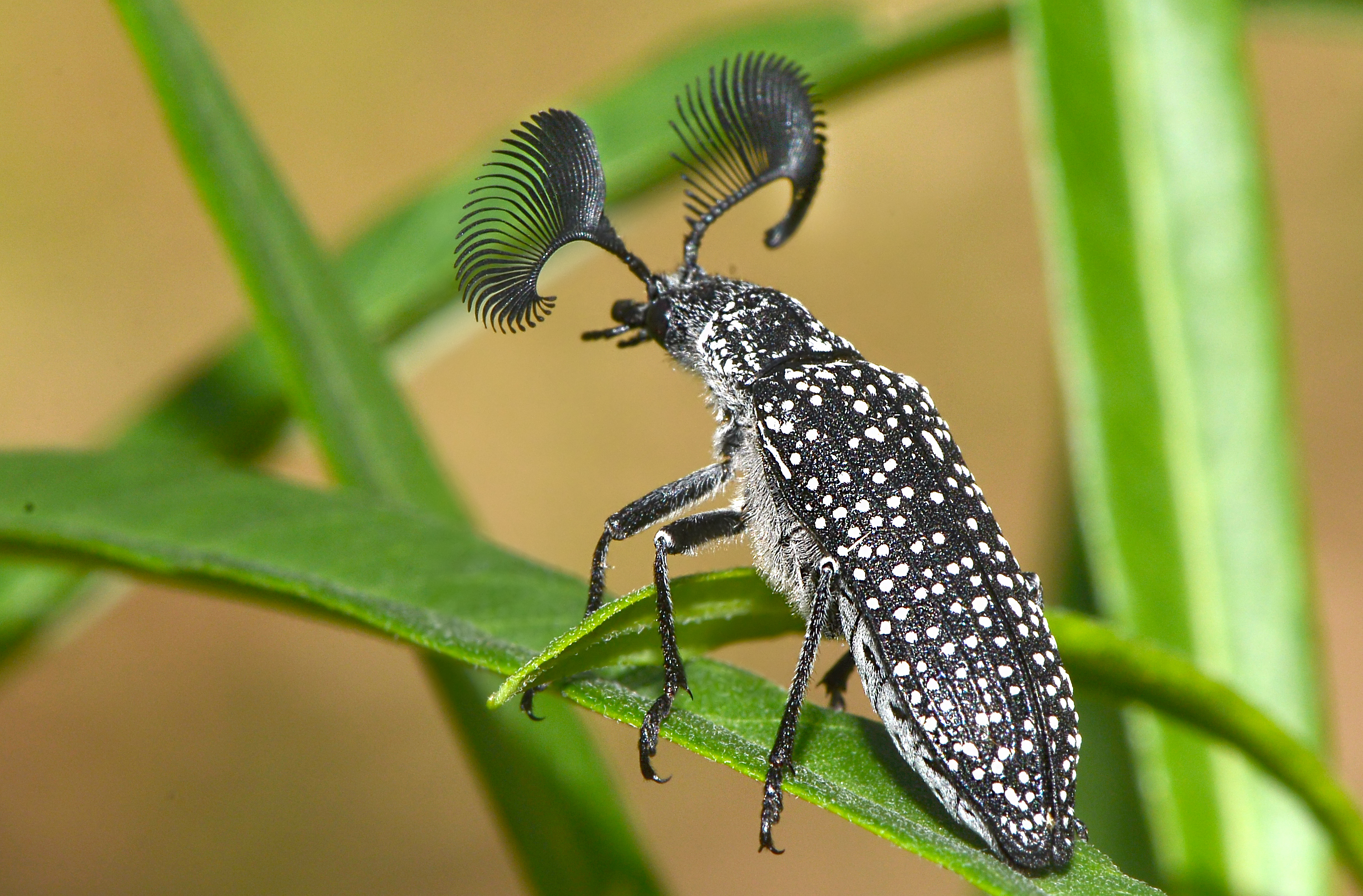
Rhipicera carinata - Male

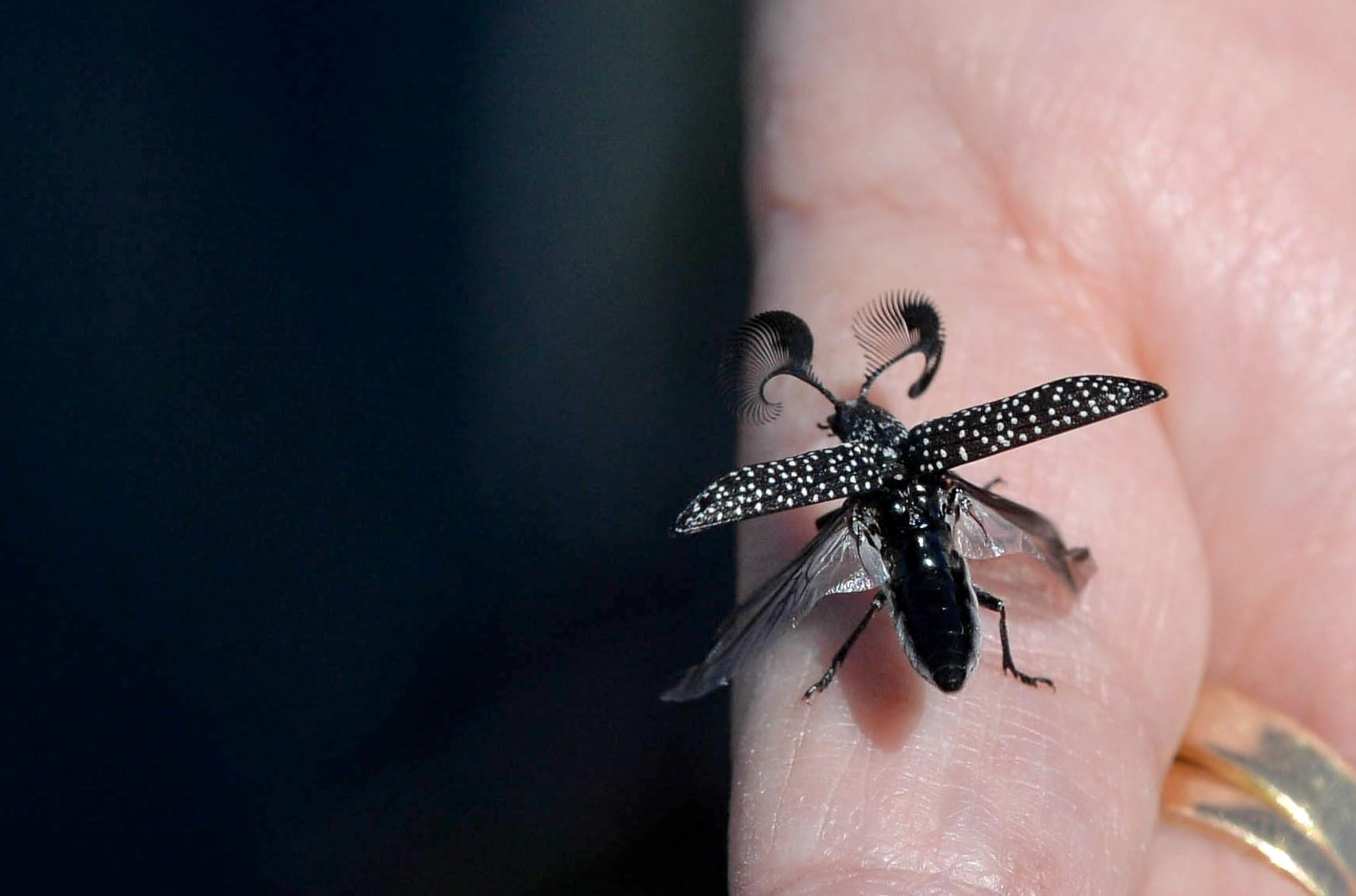
Rhipicera carinata

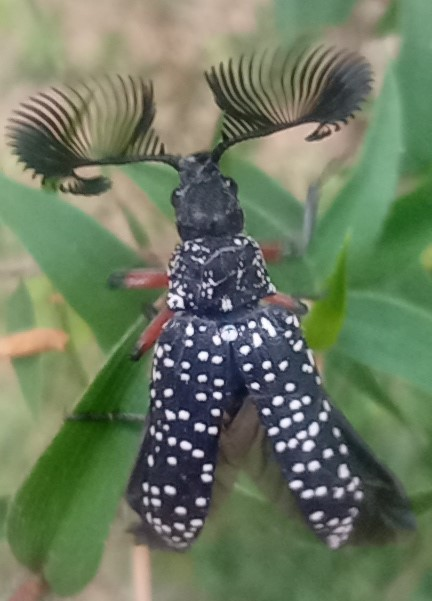
Rhipicera femorata
