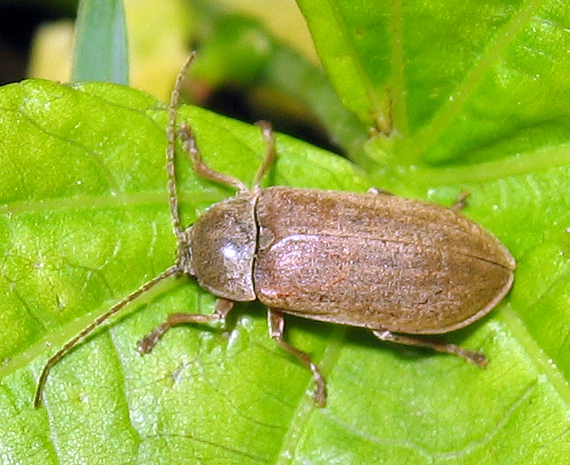
- Dascillus cervinus

Scientific classification
- Kingdom: Animalia
- Phylum: Arthropoda
- Class: Insecta
- Order: Coleoptera
- Suborder: Polyphaga
- Infraorder: Elateriformia
- Family: Dascillidae
- Genus: Dascillus; Latreille, 1796

= Dascillus =

Genus of beetles

Dascillus is a genus of soft-bodied plant beetles in the family Dascillidae. There are more than 20 described species in Dascillus.

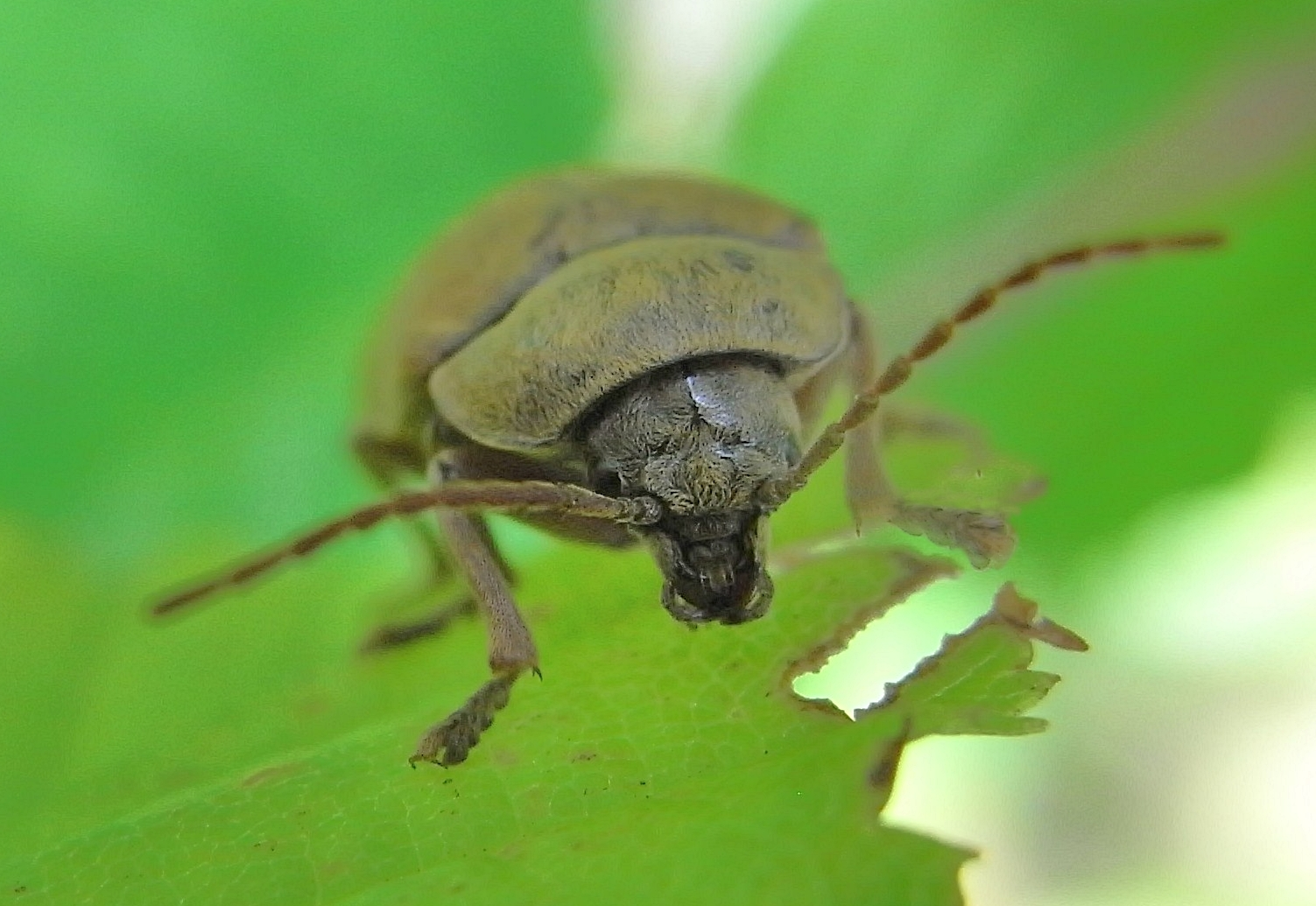
Dascillus cervinus

== Species ==
These 24 species belong to the genus Dascillus:

- Dascillus cervinus (Linnaeus, 1758)
- Dascillus chifengi Jin, Ślipiński & Pang, 2013
- Dascillus congruus Pascoe, 1860
- Dascillus corporaali Pic, 1923
- Dascillus davidsoni (LeConte, 1859)
- Dascillus elongatus Zhang, 1989
- Dascillus flatus Zhang, 1989
- Dascillus formosanus Jin, Ślipiński & Pang, 2013
- Dascillus lanceus Jin, Ślipiński & Pang, 2013
- Dascillus latahensis Lewis, 1973
- Dascillus lateralis Megerle
- Dascillus levigatus Li, Ślipiński & Jin, 2017
- Dascillus liangshanensis
- Dascillus lithographicus Wickham, 1911
- Dascillus malachiticus Knoch
- Dascillus musculus Zhang & al., 1994
- Dascillus plumbeus (Horn, 1880)
- Dascillus relictus Zhang, 1989
- Dascillus shandongianus Zhang, 1989
- Dascillus sicanus Fairmaire, 1861
- Dascillus smaragdinus Megerle
- Dascillus sparsus Dahl
- Dascillus subundatus Peiroleri
- † Dascyllus lithographicus Wickham, 1911
