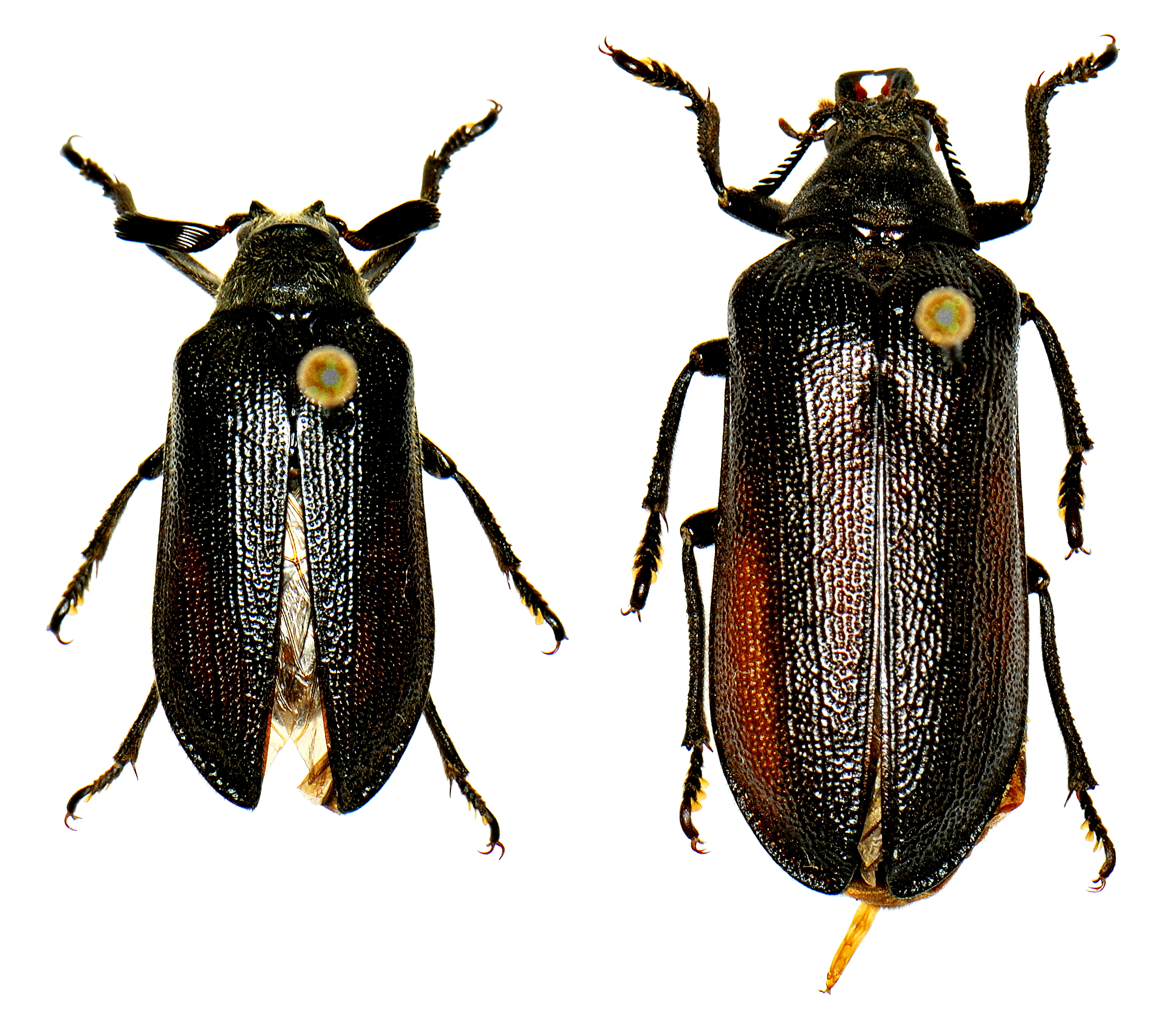
- Sandalus niger

Scientific classification
- Kingdom: Animalia
- Phylum: Arthropoda
- Class: Insecta
- Order: Coleoptera
- Suborder: Polyphaga
- Infraorder: Elateriformia
- Family: Rhipiceridae
- Genus: Sandalus; Knoch, 1801

Synonyms
- Ptyocerus Thunberg, 1806; Microrhipis Guérin-Méneville, 1831; Megarhipis Laporte, 1834; Ptiocerus Laporte, 1834 (Emend.); Demodocus Guérin-Méneville, 1843

= Sandalus =

Genus of beetles

Sandalus is a genus of cicada parasite beetles in the family Rhipiceridae.

== Species ==
- Sandalus atricolor Picco, 1916
- Sandalus attenuatus (Laporte, 1834)
- Sandalus bowkeri Péringuey, 1888
- Sandalus californicus (LeConte, 1861)
- Sandalus capensis (Guérin-Méneville, 1843)
- Sandalus castanescens Fairmaire, 1897
- Sandalus costipennis Boheman, 1851
- Sandalus cribricollis Van Dyke, 1923
- Sandalus distinctus Péringuey, 1888
- Sandalus goryi (Laporte, 1834)
- Sandalus insuleatus Pic, 1923
- Sandalus kani Sakai & Sakai, 1981
- Sandalus marginatus Péringuey, 1888
- Sandalus mystacinus (Fabricius, 1794)
- Sandalus nebulosus (Guérin-Méneville, 1843)
- Sandalus niger Knoch, 1801
- Sandalus petrophya Knoch, 1801
- Sandalus porosus LeConte, 1868
- Sandalus proximus Péringuey, 1888
- Sandalus punctulatus Boheman, 1851
- Sandalus randyi Schnepp & Powell, 2018
- Sandalus sauteri Emden, 1924
- Sandalus segnis Lewis, 1887
- Sandalus subelongatus Picco, 1907
- Sandalus taiwanicus Lee, Satô & Sakai, 2005
