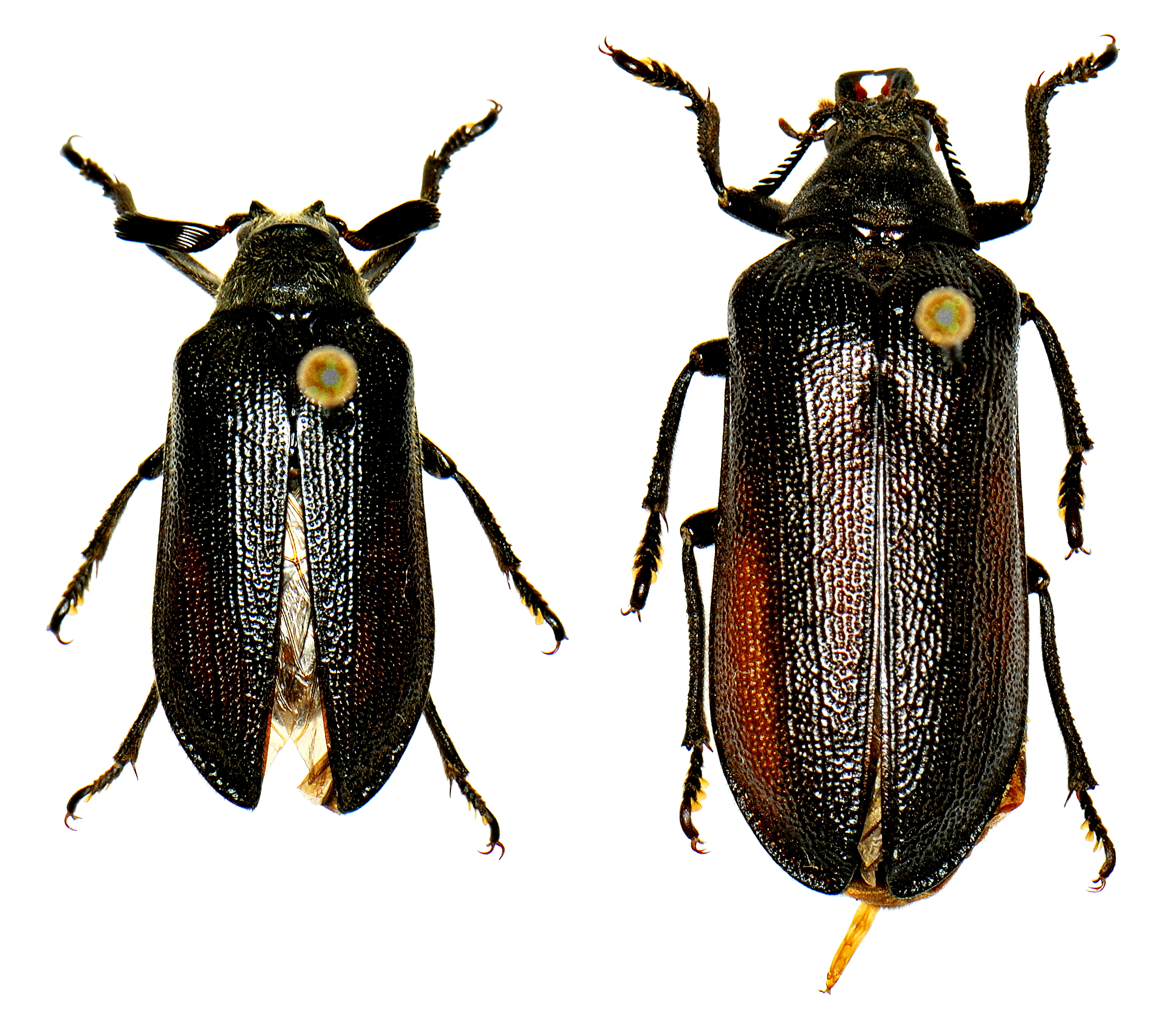

Scientific classification
- Kingdom: Animalia
- Phylum: Arthropoda
- Clade: Pancrustacea
- Class: Insecta
- Order: Coleoptera
- Suborder: Polyphaga
- Infraorder: Elateriformia
- Family: Rhipiceridae
- Genus: Sandalus
- Species: S. niger

Binomial name
- Sandalus niger Knoch, 1801

= Sandalus niger =

Species of beetle

Sandalus niger, known generally as the cedar beetle or cicada parasite beetle, is a species of cicada parasite beetle in the family Rhipiceridae. It is found in North America.

Although both females and males fly, the females are usually found motionless on the side of the elm trees. Males fly throughout the afternoon during temperatures ranging from 15 to 30C, anything below 15C causes the males to be immobilized. Unless it involves periods of mating, in this case, they stay motionless and do not fly. Once mating is completed, the females go high into the trees, around 10 meters or higher, before releasing their eggs in holes or behind the bark of the elms.
