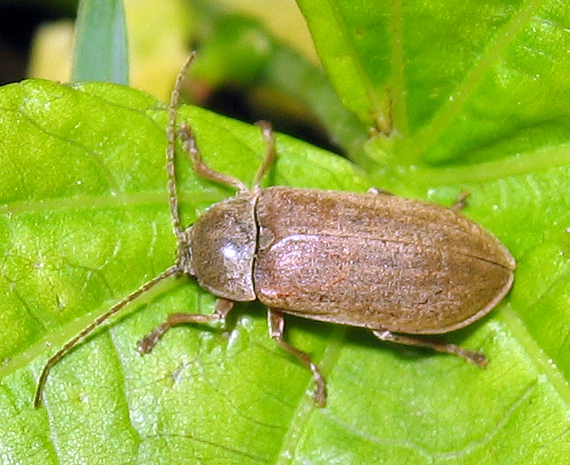
- Dascillus cervinus

Scientific classification
- Kingdom: Animalia
- Phylum: Arthropoda
- Clade: Pancrustacea
- Class: Insecta
- Order: Coleoptera
- Suborder: Polyphaga
- Infraorder: Elateriformia
- Superfamily: Dascilloidea
- Family: Dascillidae; Guérin-Méneville, 1843

Subfamilies
- Dascillinae; Karumiinae

= Dascillidae =

Dascillidae Temporal range: Aptian–Recent

Family of beetles

Dascillidae is a family of beetles within the clade Elateriformia. There are about 100 extant species in 11 genera, which are found worldwide. Dascillidae together with Rhipiceridae form the super family Dascilloidea.

== Taxonomy ==
The family was named by Guérin Méneville in 1843. The family is divided up into two poorly defined subfamilies, Karumiinae and Dascillinae.

== Description ==
Adult Dascillidae are 4.5–25 mm long with an elongate body that is somewhat convex in cross-section. They are covered in dense grey/brown hairs. Karumiines have highly modified soft-bodies, similar to some members of Elateroidea.

== Ecology ==
The adults can be found on grass during the springtime. The larvae occur in moist soil or under rocks. The larvae are thought to feed on roots or decaying plant matter. Some karumiines like Karumia are associated with termites.

== Genera ==
- Anorus LeConte, 1859
- Coptocera Murray, 1868
- Dascillus Latreille, 1796
- Drilocephalus Pic, 1918
- Emmita Escalera, 1914
- Genecerus Walker, 1871
- Karumia Escalera, 1913
- Metallidascillus Pic, 1914
- Notodascillus Carter, 1935
- Petalon Schoenherr, 1833
- Pleolobus Philippi, 1864
- Sinocaulus Deyrolle & Fairmaire, 1878
- †Baltodascillus Kundrata et al., 2021 Baltic Amber, Eocene
- †Cretodascillus Jin et al, 2013 Yixian Formation, China, Early Cretaceous (Aptian)
- †Lyprodascillus Zhang, 1989 Shanwang, China, Miocene (familial attribution uncertain)
- †Parelateriformius Yan & Wang, 2010 Daohugou Beds, China, Middle–Late Jurassic
