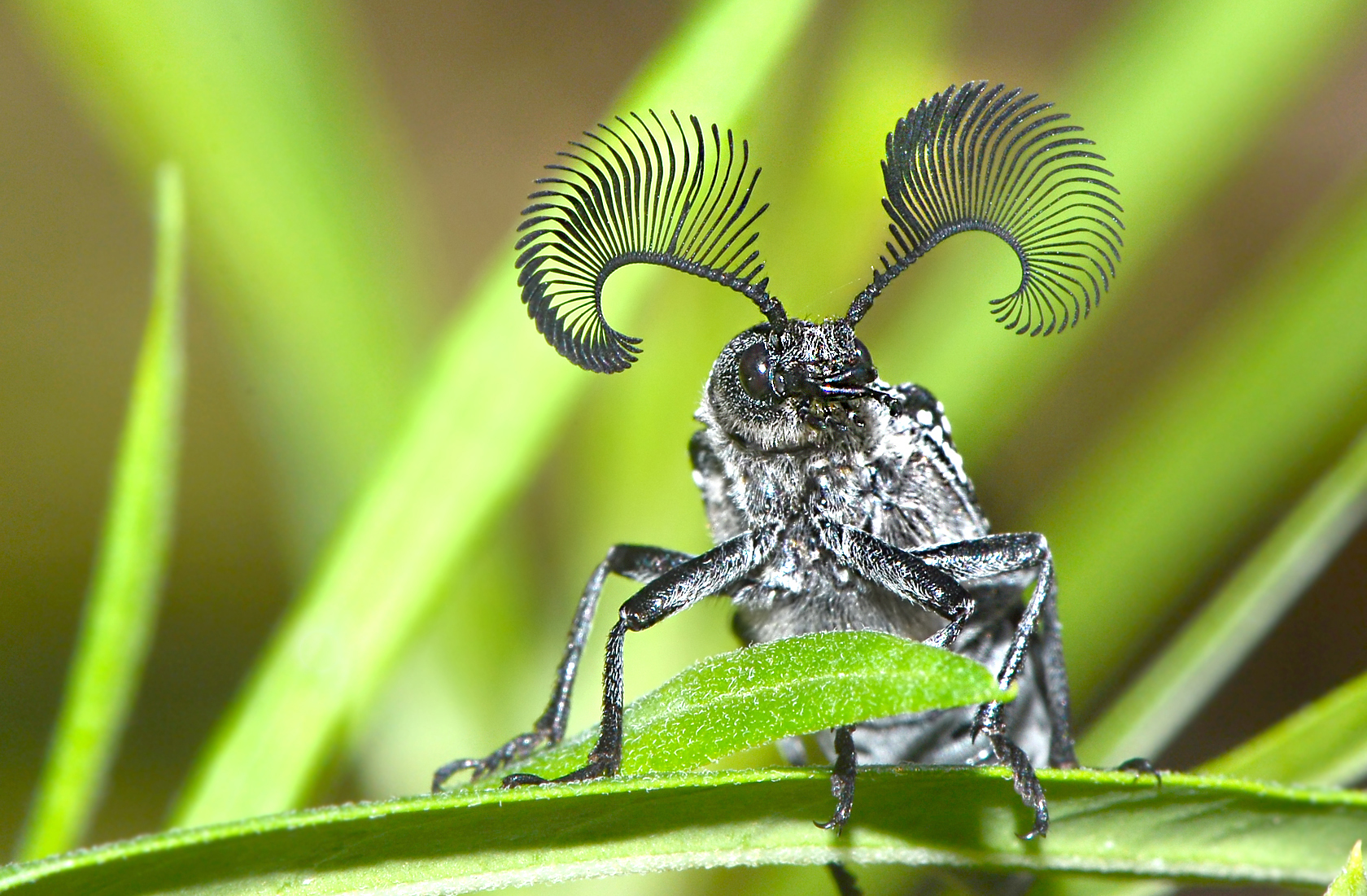
- Rhipicera carinata

Scientific classification
- Kingdom: Animalia
- Phylum: Arthropoda
- Clade: Pancrustacea
- Class: Insecta
- Order: Coleoptera
- Suborder: Polyphaga
- Infraorder: Elateriformia
- Superfamily: Dascilloidea
- Family: Rhipiceridae; Latreille, 1834

= Rhipiceridae =

Family of beetles

Rhipiceridae is a family of beetles found worldwide. The larva of rhipicerids are parasitoids of cicada nymphs. Rhipiceridae and Dascillidae form the super family Dascilloidea, within the Elateriformia.

== Taxonomic history ==
The taxonomic history of Rhipiceridae began with J. Fabricius who described Hispa mystacina in 1775, which was later included in the new genus Rhipicera by Latreille (1817) who rightly noticed that the Fabrician species did not belong to Hispa and placed it in the tribe ‘Cebrionites’ along with Cebrio, Dascillus and Scirtes. Since then W. Kirby, J. O. Westwood and others described several new species of Rhipicera from Australia and South America.

== Subfamilies and distribution ==
Rhipiceridae includes seven genera and about a hundred described species divided into two subfamilies, Rhipicerinae and Sandalinae. Sandalinae include most of the species and are known from North and South America, Africa, south-eastern Europe and Asia, while much less numerous Rhipicerinae, from Chile, New Caledonia and Australia, is a monophyletic lineage supported by several unambiguous apomorphies, like antennae composed of more than 11 antennomeres, relatively well developed maxillary galea and incomplete lateral pronotal carina.

== Ecology ==
The larval stages of riphicerids are external parasitioids on the nymphs of cicadas. In the species Sandalus niger, the eggs are deposited into the same holes and fissures in the bark of elm trees that cicadas deposit their eggs in. Subsequently, the first instars drop to the ground alongside the cicada nymphs, and thereafter attach themselves to them. The abundance of adult rhipicerids tracks that of the emergence of adult cicadas.

== Genera ==
Rhipicerinae:

- Oligorhipis Guérin-Méneville, 1843 Australia, New Caledonia
- Polymerius Philippi, 1871 Chile
- Polytomus Dalman, 1819 southern South America
- Rhipicera Latreille, 1817 Australia

Sandalinae:

- Arrhaphipterus Schaum, 1862 Europe to Central Asia
- Chamoerrhipes Latreille, 1834 Africa
- Sandalus Knoch, 1801 Americas, Asia, Africa

== Gallery ==
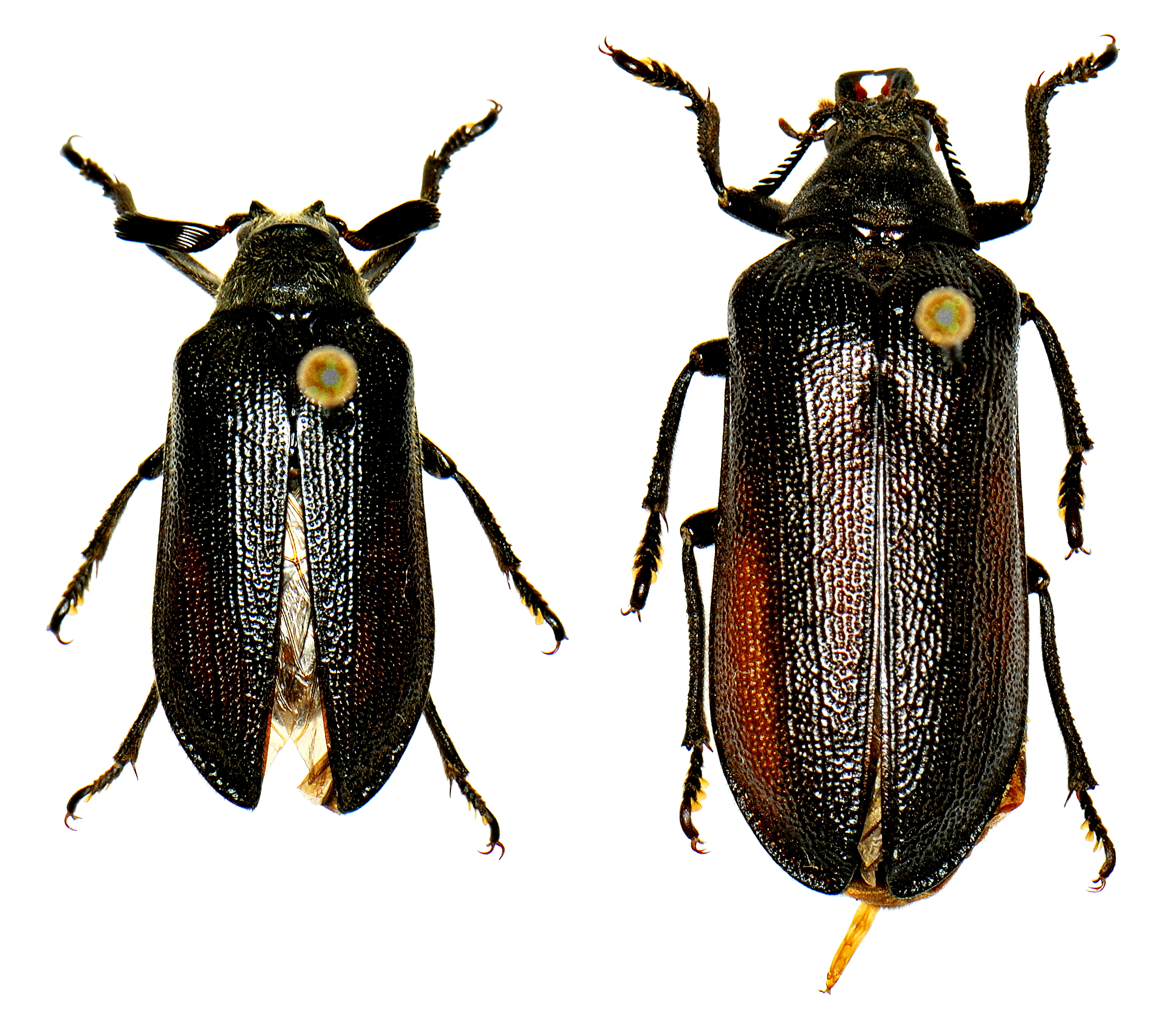
Sandalus niger

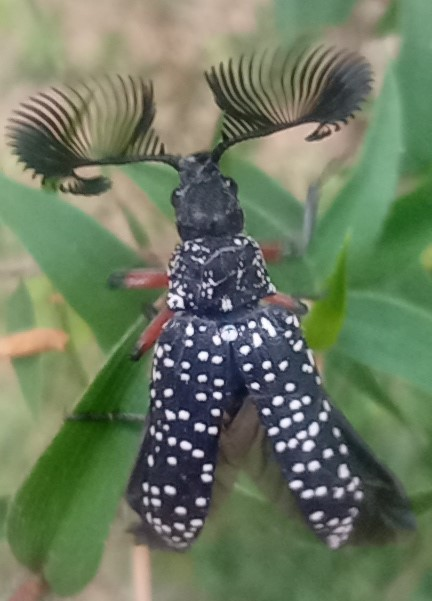
Rhicpicera femorata

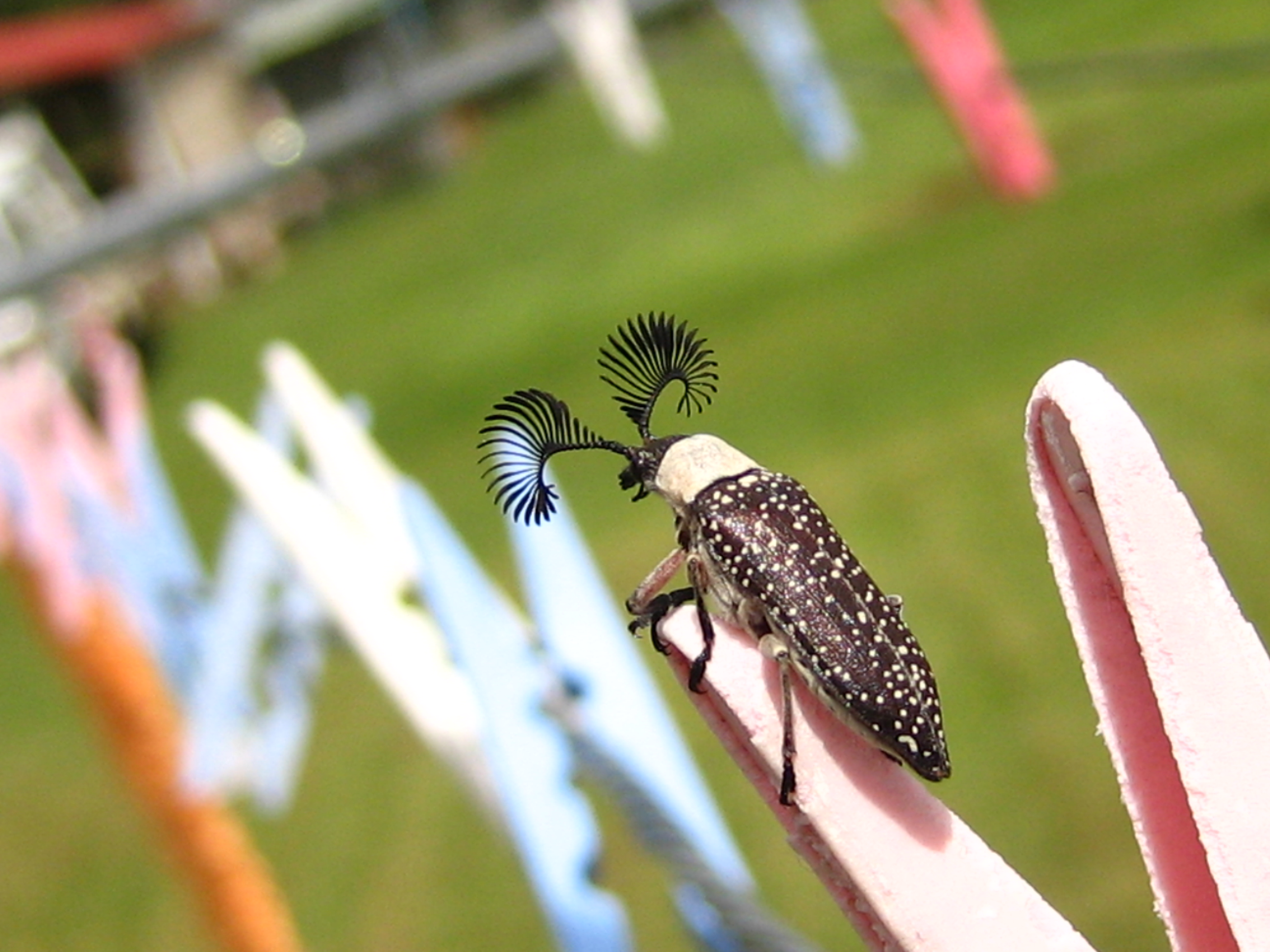
Rhipicera mystacina

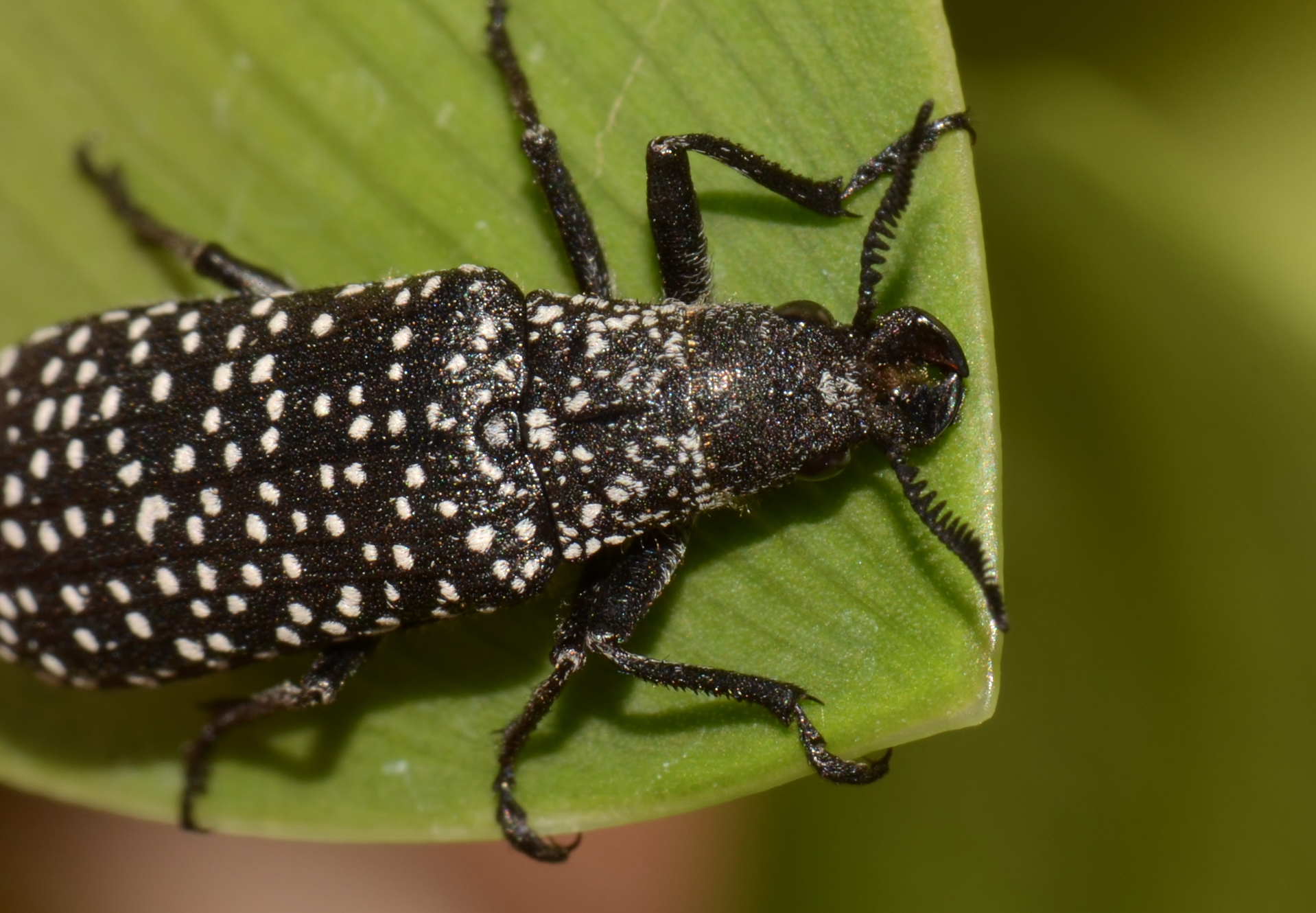
Rhipicera carinata - Western Australia

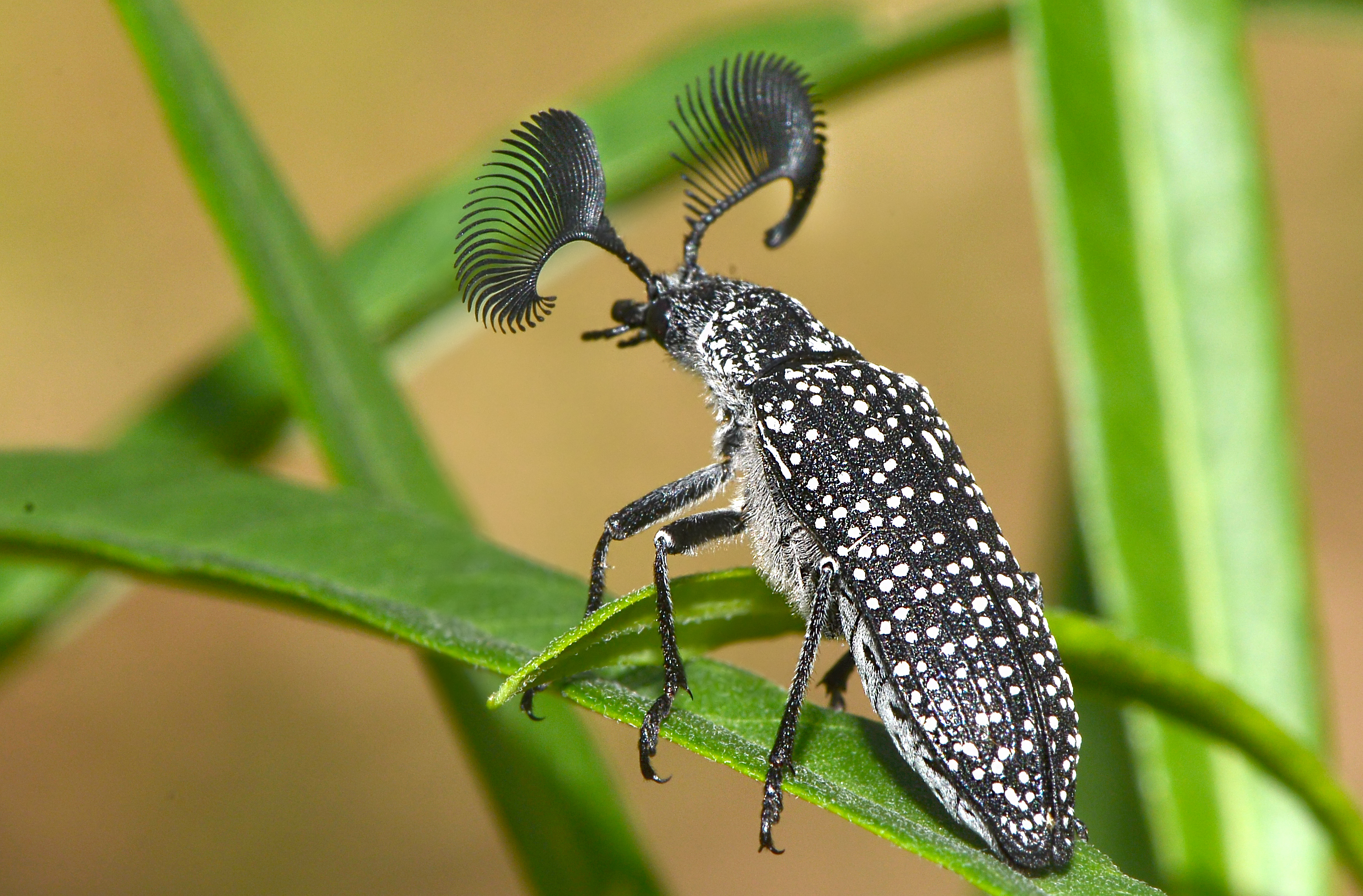
Rhipicera carinata - Western Australia

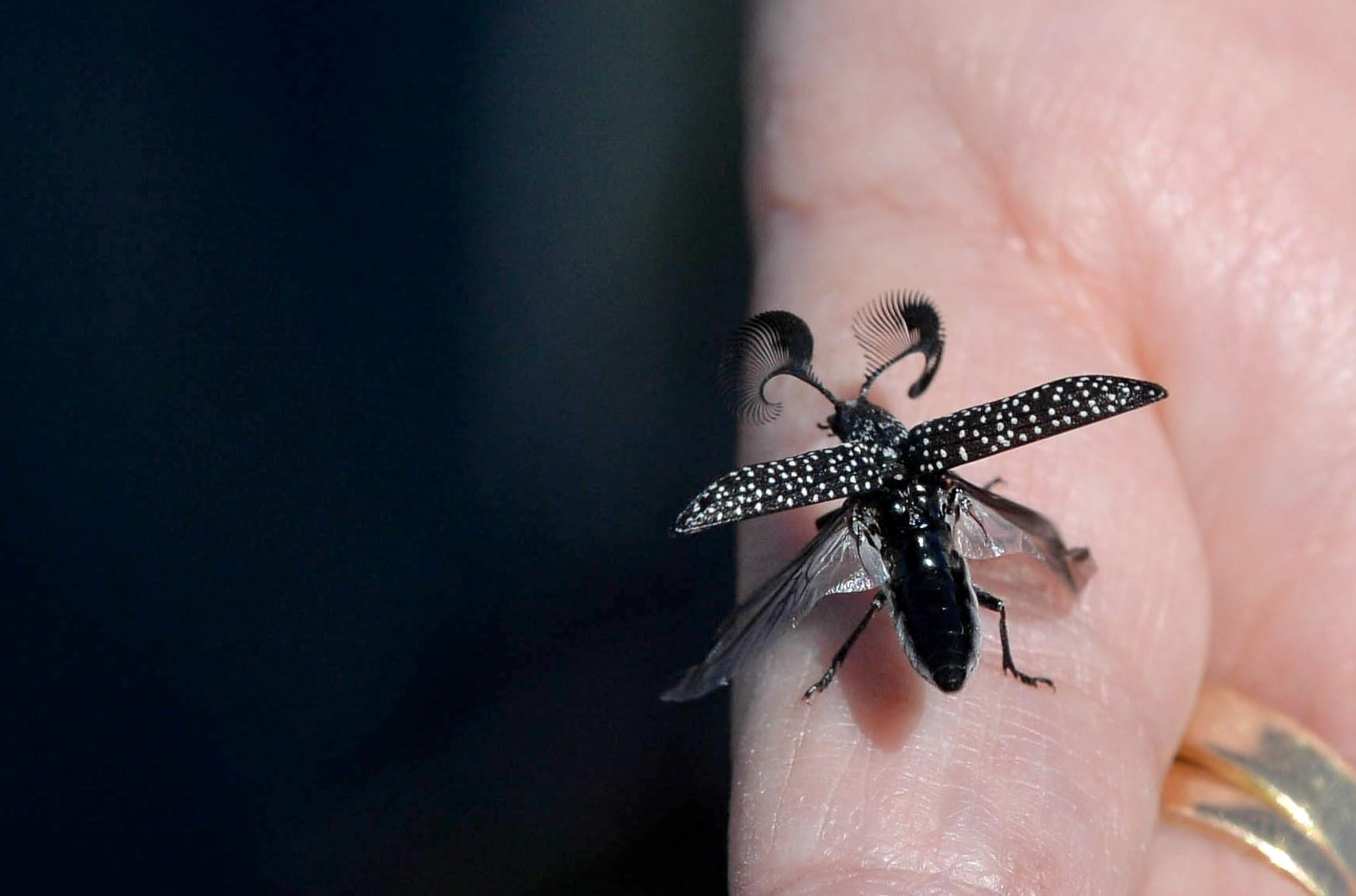
Rhipicera carinata

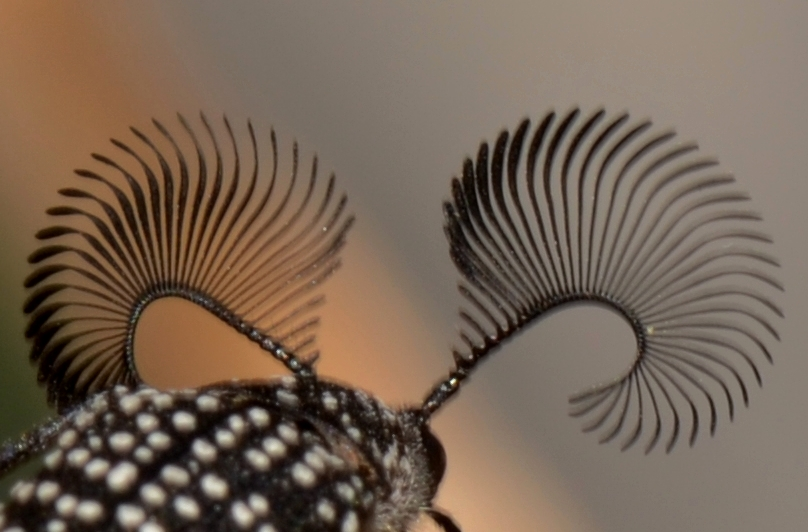
Rhipicera carinata - antennae
