= Amphizoa sinica =

Scientific classification
- Kingdom: Animalia
- Phylum: Arthropoda
- Clade: Pancrustacea
- Class: Insecta
- Order: Coleoptera
- Suborder: Adephaga
- Family: Amphizoidae
- Genus: Amphizoa
- Species: A. sinica

Binomial name
- Amphizoa sinica Yu & Stork 1991

Species of beetle

Amphizoa sinica is a species of beetle in the Amphizoidae family. The length of its body is between 11 and 13.5 millimeters. Its metasternal process is depressed, with the lateral margin raised. It lives in the northeastern province of Jilin in China and in North Korea.

It was first described in 1991 by Yu Peiyu and Nigel Stork.
