= Catascopus elegans =

Scientific classification
- Kingdom: Animalia
- Phylum: Arthropoda
- Class: Insecta
- Order: Coleoptera
- Suborder: Adephaga
- Family: Carabidae
- Subfamily: Lebiinae
- Tribe: Lebiini
- Subtribe: Pericalina
- Genus: Catascopus
- Species: C. elegans

Binomial name
- Catascopus elegans (Weber, 1801)

Species of beetle

Catascopus elegans is a species in the beetle family Carabidae. It is found in Southeast Asia and Australia.

== Subspecies ==
These 11 subspecies belong to the species Catascopus elegans:

- Catascopus elegans amoenus Chaudoir, 1861 (Indonesia, New Guinea, and Papua)
- Catascopus elegans andamanicus Baehr, 2012 (India)
- Catascopus elegans australasiae Hope, 1842 (Australia)
- Catascopus elegans biakensis Baehr, 2012 (New Guinea)
- Catascopus elegans cyaneus Chaudoir, 1872 (Australia)
- Catascopus elegans elegans (Weber, 1801) (China, Nepal, India, Myanmar, Thailand, Laos, Vietnam, Malaysia, Indonesia, and Borneo)
- Catascopus elegans lateralis Brullé, 1834 (Indonesia)
- Catascopus elegans philippinus Baehr, 2012 (Philippines)
- Catascopus elegans salomonicus Baehr, 2012 (the Solomon Islands)
- Catascopus elegans scintillans Bates, 1892 (Nepal and India)
- Catascopus elegans viridans Baehr, 2012 (Indonesia)
