= Aspidytes =

Scientific classification
- Kingdom: Animalia
- Phylum: Arthropoda
- Clade: Pancrustacea
- Class: Insecta
- Order: Coleoptera
- Suborder: Adephaga
- Family: Aspidytidae
- Genus: Aspidytes; Ribera, Beutel, Balke & Vogler, 2002
- Species: A. niobe

Binomial name
- Aspidytes niobe Ribera, Beutel, Balke & Vogler, 2002

Genus of beetles

Aspidytes is a genus of aquatic beetles in the family Aspidytidae, first recorded in 2002 from specimens in South Africa. The genus contains the single species Aspidytes niobe. Originally a second species from China was placed in the same genus but has later been transferred to Sinaspidytes. The aquatic beetle is 6.5 - 7.2 mm long and lives in hygropetric habitats.
