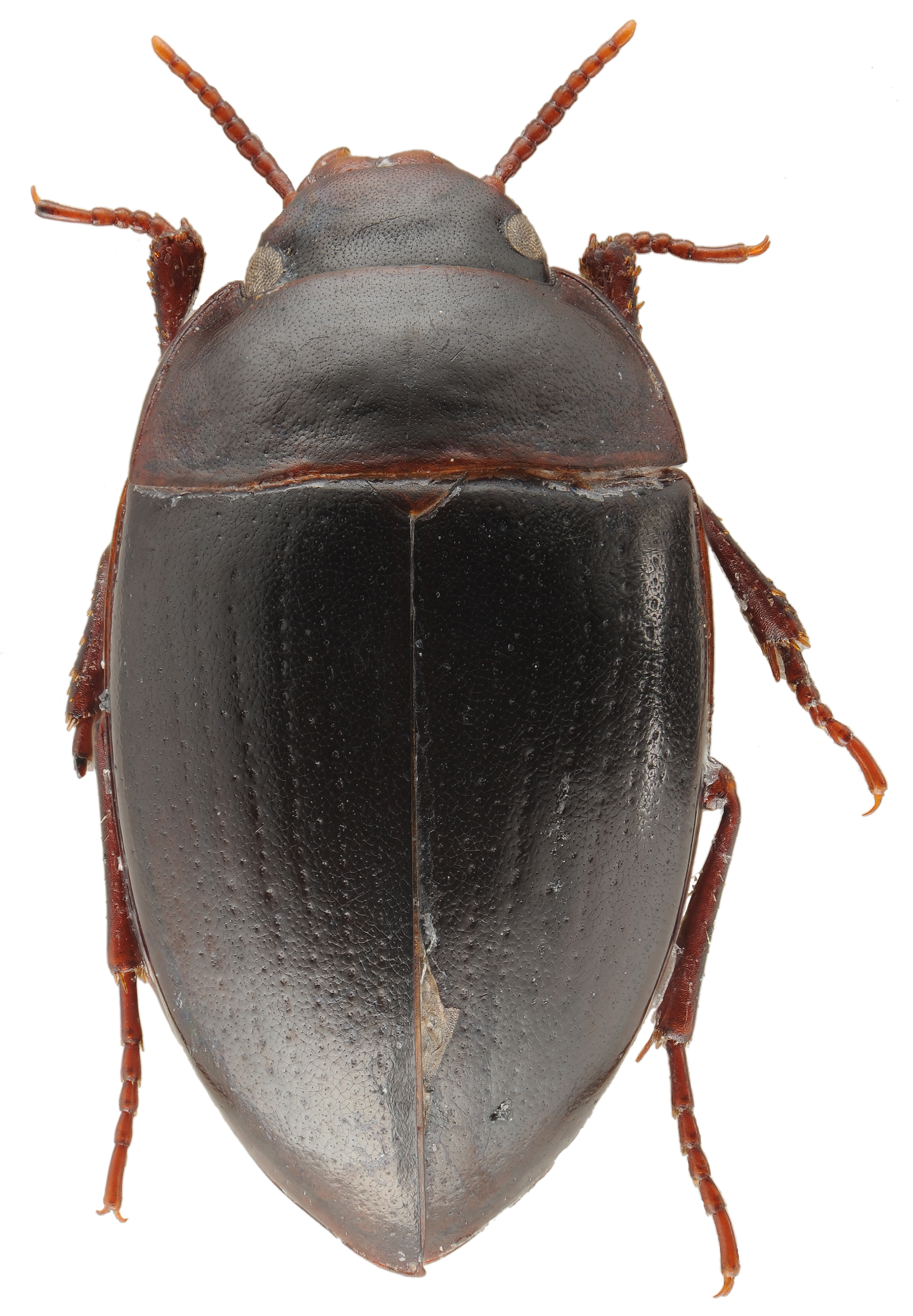

Scientific classification
- Kingdom: Animalia
- Phylum: Arthropoda
- Class: Insecta
- Order: Coleoptera
- Suborder: Adephaga
- Family: Aspidytidae
- Genus: Sinaspidytes; Balke, Beutel & Ribera, 2016
- Species: S. wrasei

Binomial name
- Sinaspidytes wrasei (Balke, Ribera & Beutel, 2003)

= Sinaspidytes =

Genus of beetles

Sinaspidytes is a genus of aquatic beetles in Aspidytidae, first recorded in 2003 from specimens in the Shaanxi province, China. It is monotypic, with the only species being Sinaspidytes wrasei. Originally this species was placed in the genus Aspidytes with a second species from South Africa, but was later transferred to Sinaspidytes. The genus contains the single species S. wrasei. The aquatic beetle is 4.8 - 5.2 mm long and lives in hygropetric habitats.
