= Amphizoa striata =

Scientific classification
- Domain: Eukaryota
- Kingdom: Animalia
- Phylum: Arthropoda
- Class: Insecta
- Order: Coleoptera
- Suborder: Adephaga
- Family: Amphizoidae
- Genus: Amphizoa
- Species: A. striata

Binomial name
- Amphizoa striata Van Dyke, 1927

Species of beetle

Amphizoa striata is a species of trout-stream beetle in the family Amphizoidae. It is found in North America. It is between 13 and 15 millimeters long. Its front tarsi have a well-developed groove on the posterior surface and grooves bearing a fringe of long hair-like setae. It lives in British Columbia, Oregon, and Washington.
