= Amphizoa davidis =

Scientific classification
- Domain: Eukaryota
- Kingdom: Animalia
- Phylum: Arthropoda
- Class: Insecta
- Order: Coleoptera
- Suborder: Adephaga
- Family: Amphizoidae
- Genus: Amphizoa
- Species: A. davidis

Binomial name
- Amphizoa davidis Lucas, 1882

Species of beetle

Amphizoa davidis is a species of beetle in the Amphizoidae family described by the entomologist Hippolyte Lucas in 1882. The beetle measures between 10.5 and 16 millimeters in length. Its elytra are most notable for lacking a carina on the fifth interval. The pronotum has a lateral margin without lateral bead. The species is only known from the province Sichuan of in especially in China.
