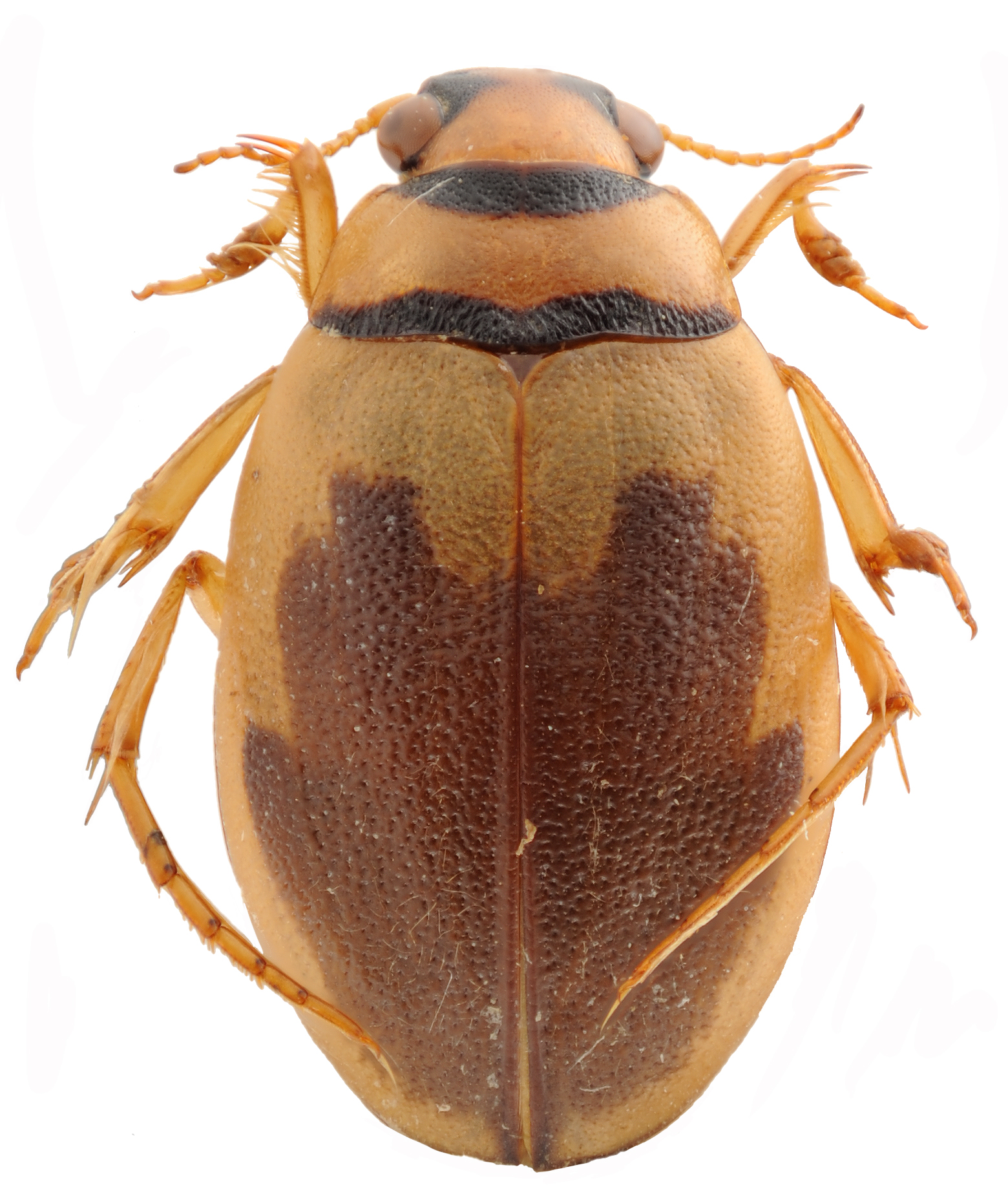
- Hygrobia hermanni Size: 8,5-11 mm

Scientific classification
- Domain: Eukaryota
- Kingdom: Animalia
- Phylum: Arthropoda
- Class: Insecta
- Order: Coleoptera
- Suborder: Adephaga
- Family: Hygrobiidae
- Genus: Hygrobia
- Species: H. hermanni

Binomial name
- Hygrobia hermanni (Fabricius, 1775)

= Hygrobia hermanni =

Species of beetle

Hygrobia hermanni, commonly known as the screech beetle, is a species of beetle in the family Hygrobiidae. It is found in Southern and Western Europe and North Africa in stagnant and muddy waters. It's able to make a strident grating noise, hence the name screech beetle. The sound is produced when the sharp edge of the 7th abdominal tergite is rubbed against a subapical median file on the elytral undersurface.
