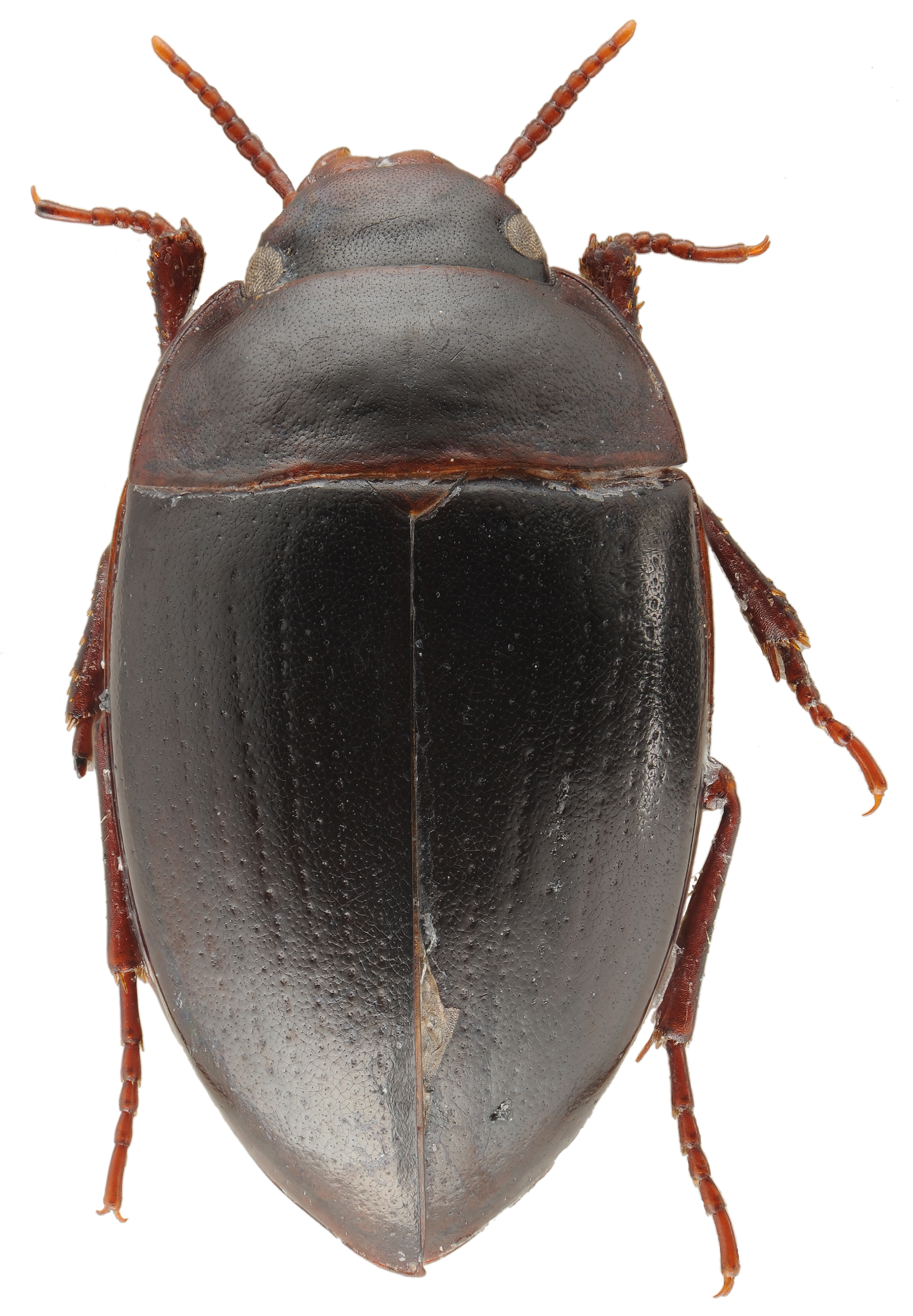
- Sinaspidytes wrasei

Scientific classification
- Kingdom: Animalia
- Phylum: Arthropoda
- Clade: Pancrustacea
- Class: Insecta
- Order: Coleoptera
- Suborder: Adephaga
- Family: Aspidytidae; Ribera, Beutel, Balke and Vogler, 2002

Genera
- Aspidytes Ribera, Beutel, Balke & Vogler, 2002; Sinaspidytes Balke, Beutel & Ribera, 2016

= Aspidytidae =

Family of beetles

Aspidytidae is a family of aquatic beetles of the suborder Adephaga, described in 2002 from specimens in South Africa and China. There are only two known species in the family and these were originally described in the genus Aspidytes, but later the new genus Sinaspidytes was erected for the species found in China. The family can also be referred to by its trivial name cliff water beetles.

== Description ==
Cliff water beetles have a streamlined body that is dorsally convex. Their size ranges from 4.8 - 7.0 mm in length. Dorsal side is predominantly black and cuticle is shiny. The head is laterally rounded and shortened with the compound eyes integrated in the outline. Legs lack swimming hairs.

=== Known species of Aspidytidae ===
Aspidytes niobe - known from South Africa. Body length 6.5 - 7.2 mm

Sinaspidytes wrasei - has only been found at one location in the Shaanxi province, China. Body length 4.8 – 5.2 mm.

== Biology and ecology ==
Larvae and adults of both A. niobe and S. wrasei are found in or in close proximity of hygropetric habitats - meaning they require a rock surface covered by a thin layer of water. Both adults and larvae are likely predacious. Eggs and pupa are yet unknown.

== Phylogeny and evolution ==
The phylogenetic placement of Aspidytidae within the superfamily Dytiscoidea is still under debate, and even whether the family is monophyletic or paraphyletic with respect to Amphizoidae.

Initially both species were categorized in the same genus – Aspidytes. Later Sinaspidytes was erected for S. wrasei following a phylogenetic analysis using 11 genes that recovered Aspidytidae as praphyletic.

- - - Sinaspidytes wrasei
  - - - Aspidytes niobe
    - - - Amphizoa insolens
      - - - Amphizoa lecontei

Later studies using genomic data have been inconclusive. A study using ultraconserved elements (UCE) still recovered Aspidytidae as paraphyletic, but with a different arrangement between the two species and Amphizoidae.

- - - Aspidytes niobe
  - - - Sinaspidytes wrasei
    - - - Amphizoa insolens
      - - - Amphizoa lecontei

However, two of the latest studies using genomic data do recover a monophyletic Aspidytidae.

- - - Aspidytes niobe
    - Sinaspidytes wrasei
  - - Amphizoa insolens
    - Amphizoa lecontei
