= Parahygrobia =

Parahygrobia Temporal range: Late Jurassic

Scientific classification
- Domain: Eukaryota
- Kingdom: Animalia
- Phylum: Arthropoda
- Class: Insecta
- Order: Coleoptera
- Suborder: Adephaga
- Family: †Parahygrobiidae; Ponomarenko, 1977
- Genus: †Parahygrobia; Ponomarenko, 1977
- Species: †P. natans

Binomial name
- †Parahygrobia natans Ponomarenko, 1977

Extinct genus of beetles

Parahygrobia natans is an extinct species of adephagan beetle. It is the only member of the genus Parahygrobia and family Parahygrobiidae. It is known only from larvae from the Late Jurassic of Russia. Cladistic analysis has placed it as the sister group to extant Hygrobiidae.
