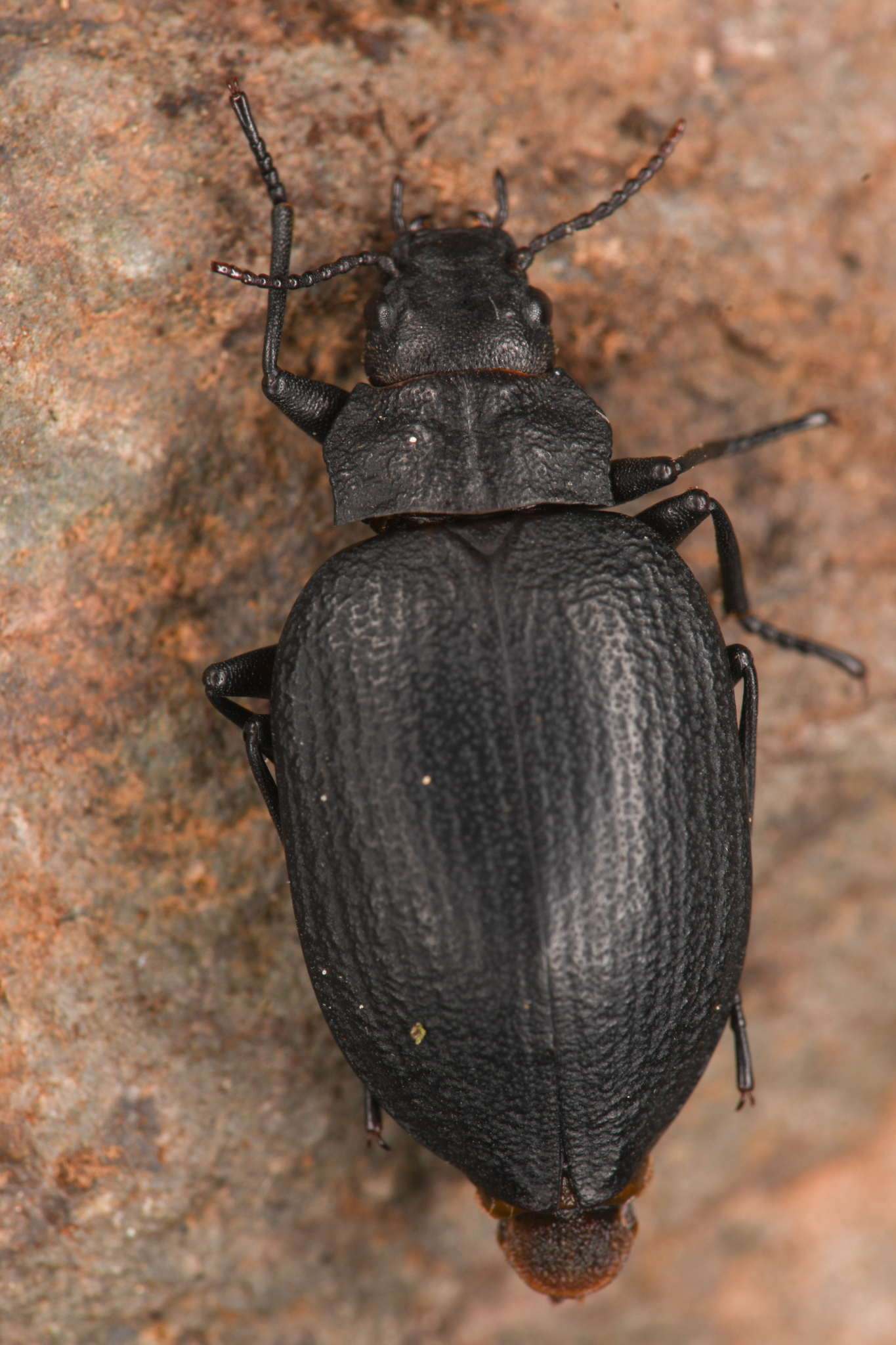
- Amphizoa insolens LeConte 1853

Scientific classification
- Kingdom: Animalia
- Phylum: Arthropoda
- Clade: Pancrustacea
- Class: Insecta
- Order: Coleoptera
- Suborder: Adephaga
- Family: Amphizoidae; LeConte, 1853
- Genus: Amphizoa; LeConte, 1853

Species
- Amphizoa davidis Lucas 1882; Amphizoa insolens LeConte 1853; Amphizoa lecontei Matthews 1872; Amphizoa sinica Yu & Stork 1991; Amphizoa striata Van Dyke 1927

= Amphizoa =

Genus of beetles

Amphizoa is a genus of aquatic beetles in the suborder Adephaga, placed in its own monogeneric family, Amphizoidae. There are five known species of Amphizoa, three in western North America and two in the eastern Palearctic. They are sometimes referred to by the common name troutstream beetles.

== Description ==
Troutstream beetles have a characteristic appearance. They are relatively large, oval, slightly convex, dull black to piceus. Body length ranges between 11–16 mm (0.43–0.63 in). The head is broad with a quadrate shape and small round eyes. The antenna is filiform, rather short with 11 segments. The pronotum is significantly narrower than the elytra and with lateral margins slightly crenulated; the prosternal processes are broad and flat, rounded to truncate at the apex; the elytra are vaguely striate and have a series of short spines of unknown function. The legs are not well adapted for swimming, and lack long swimming setae. The hind coxae extend to the lateral margin of the abdomen and the tarsal formula is 5-5-5.

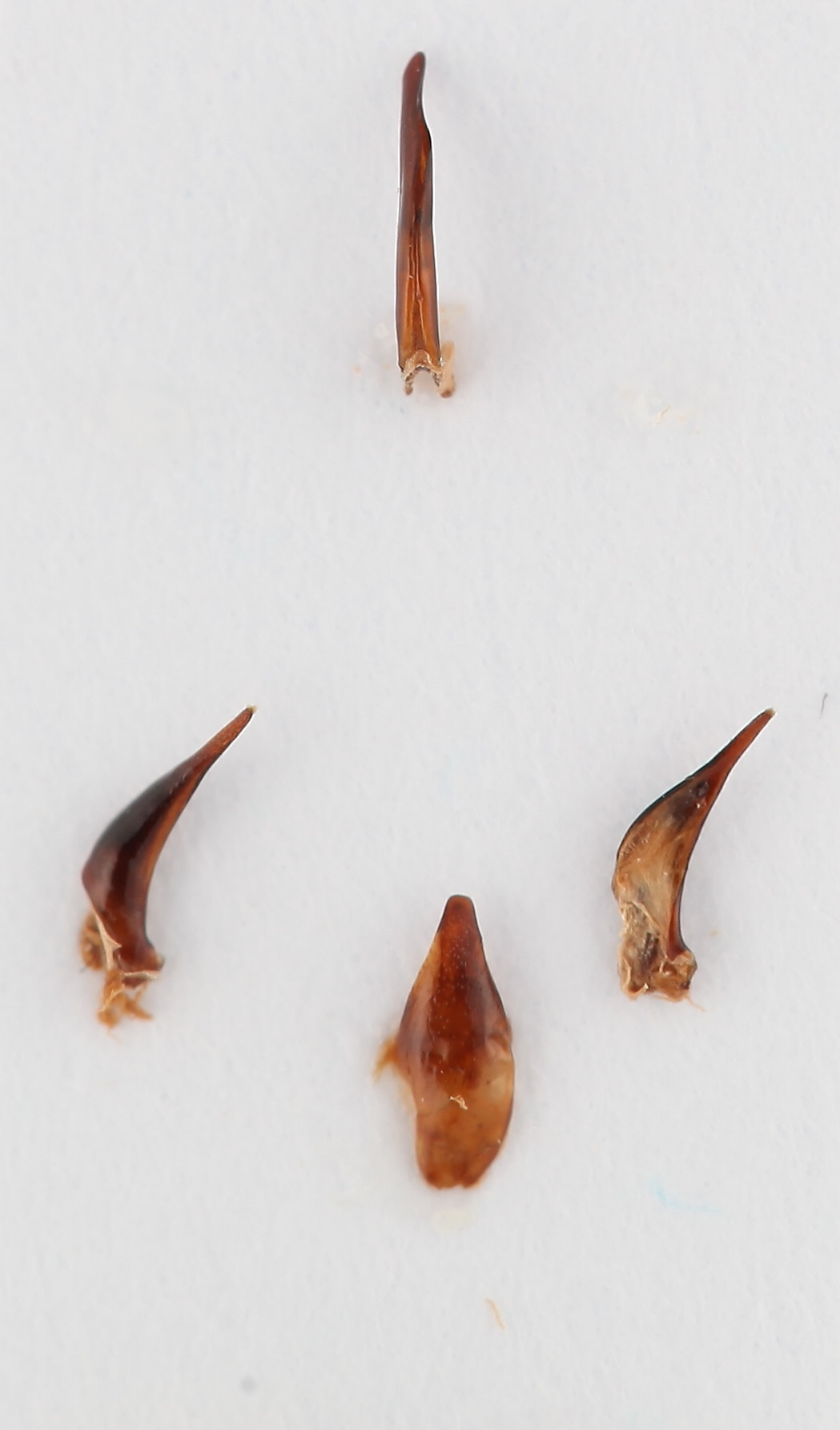
Genitalia: Amphizoa insolens

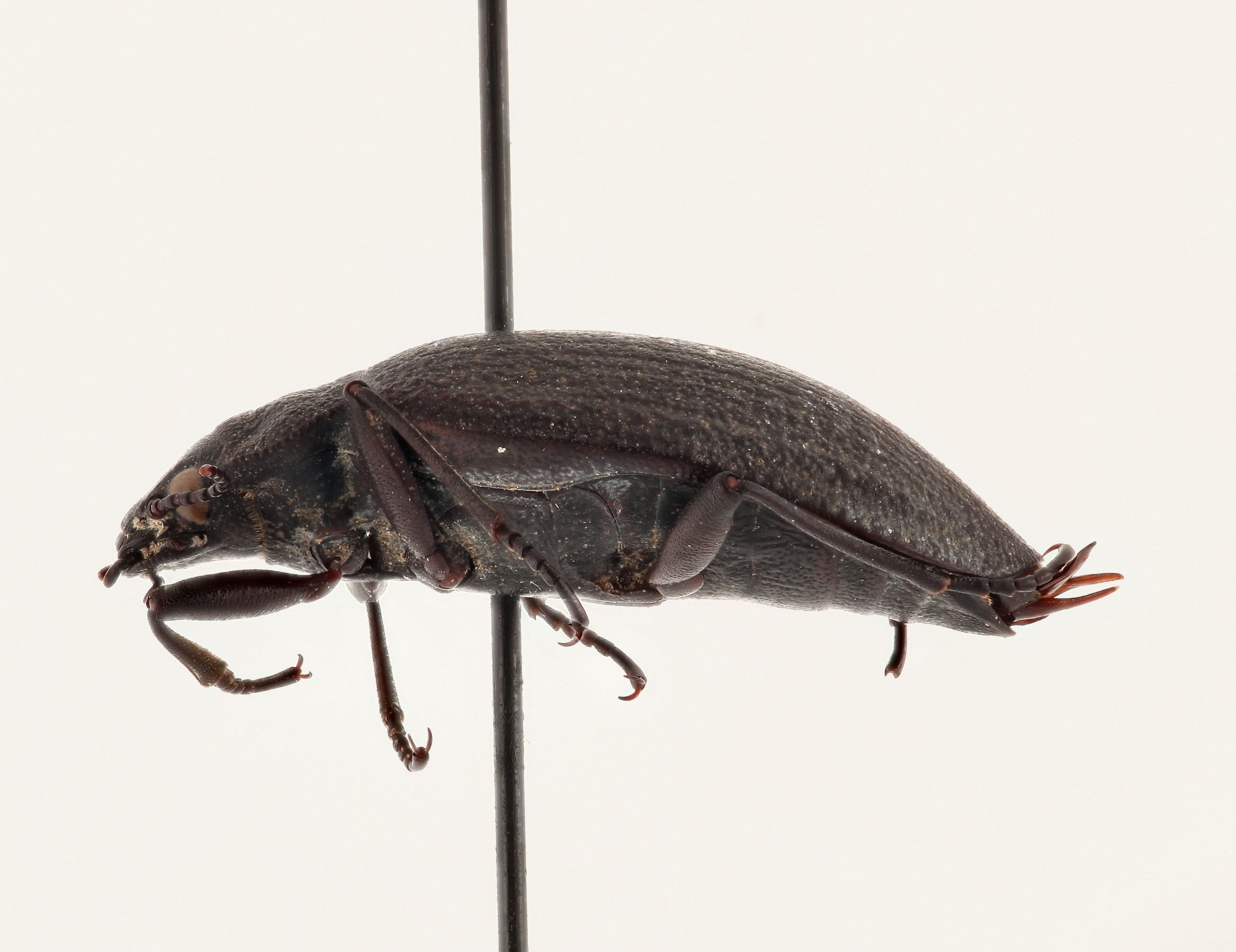
Lateral view: Amphizoa insolens

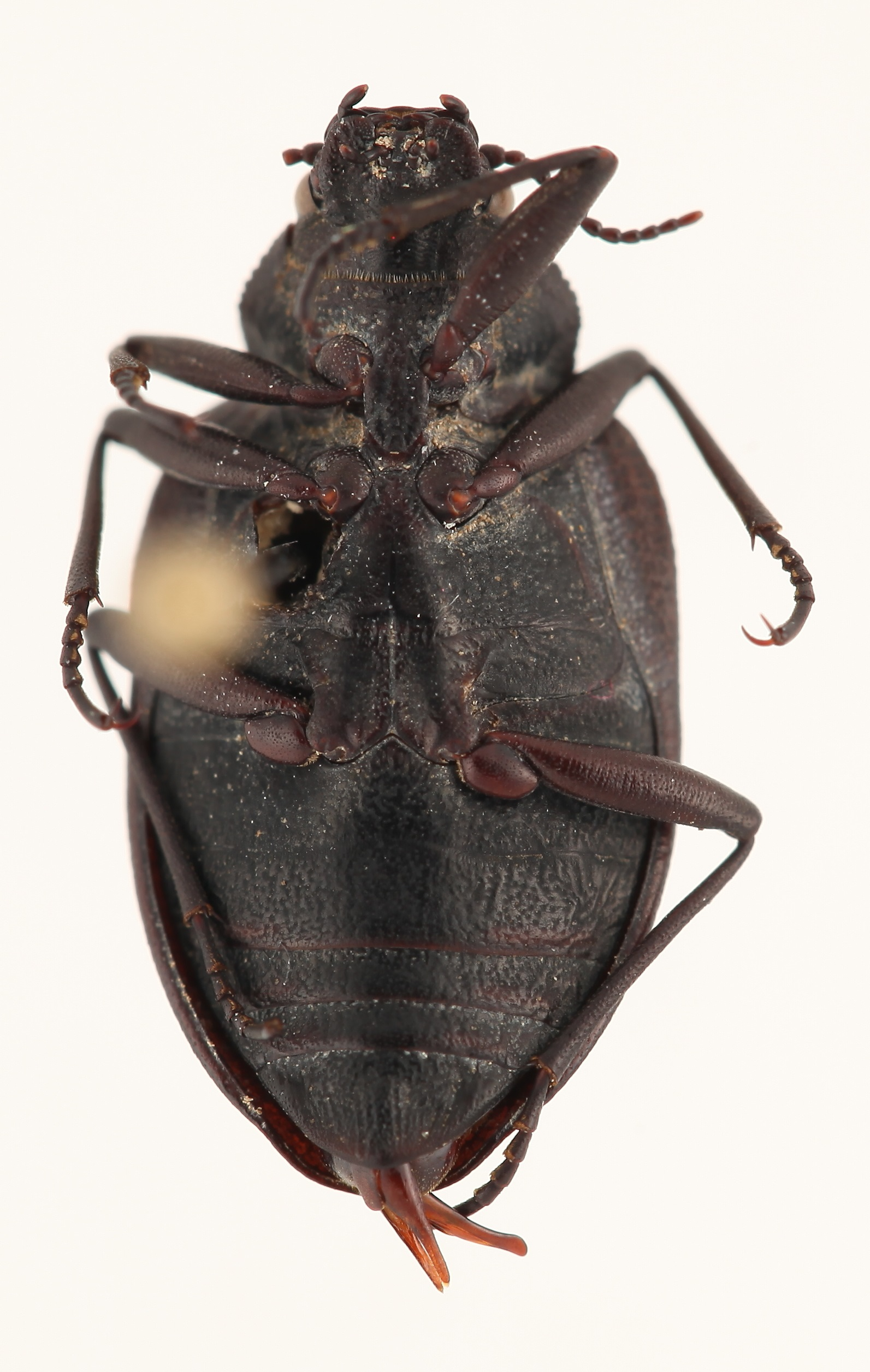
Ventral view: Amphizoa insolens

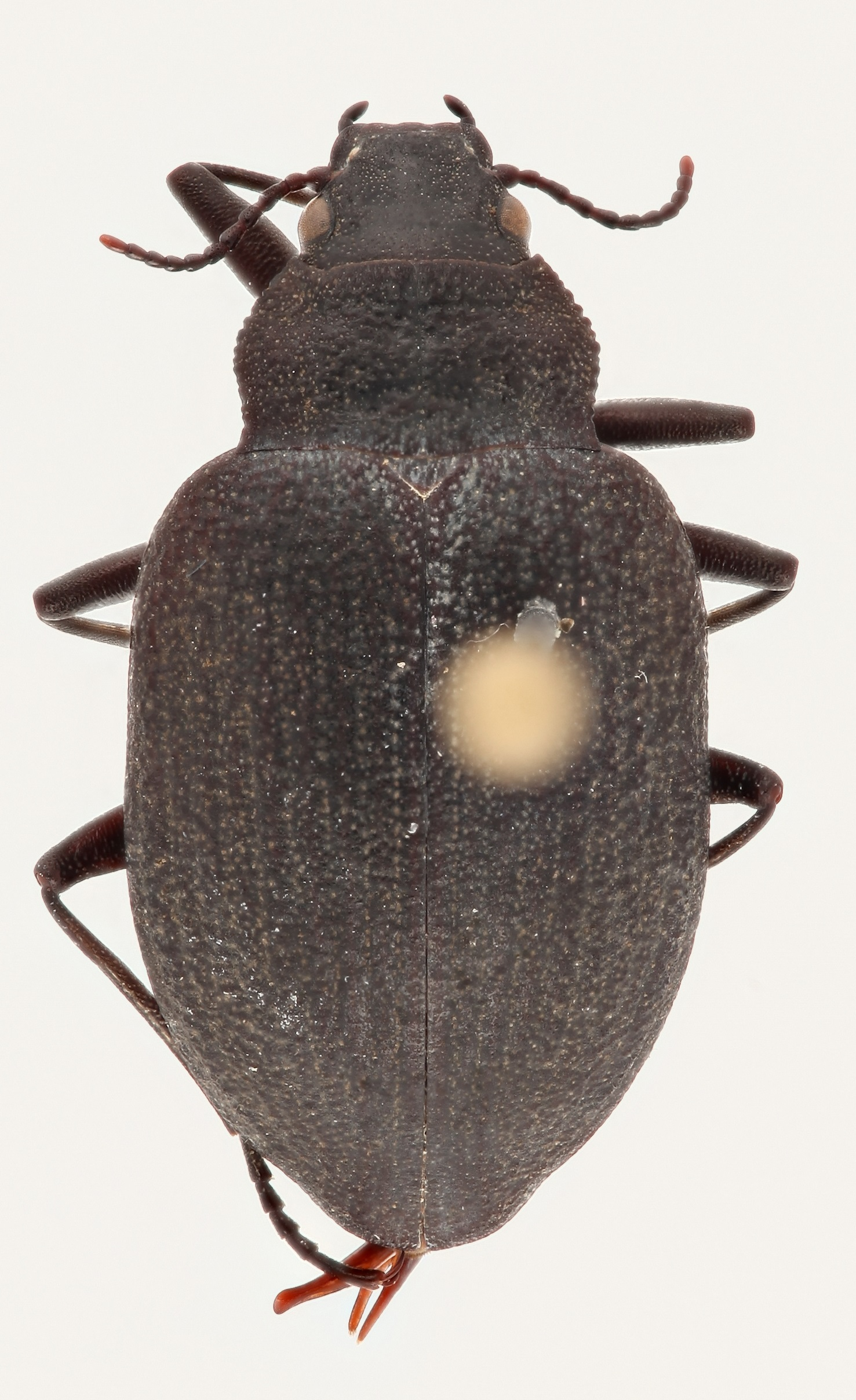
Dorsal view: Amphizoa insolens

=== Known species of Amphizoa ===
The genus Amphizoa contains the following known species:

- Amphizoa davidis
- Amphizoa insolens
- Amphizoa lecontei
- Amphizoa sinica
- Amphizoa striata

== Biology ==
Troutstream beetles can be found in streams and rivers in mountain regions of China, North Korea and western North America. Streams are often cold and medium to fast flowing, and the beetles can be found clinging to rocks, woody debris or at margins. Both adults and larvae are predators, especially on stonefly larvae but occasionally on other aquatic insects. Larvae may also scavenge dead insects.

When disturbed, adults exude a yellowish fluid from the anus, with an odor described as that of cantaloupe or decaying wood, probably as a defense mechanism against predators like frogs and toads.

== Phylogeny and evolution ==
Amphizoidae share some plesiomorphic features with Carabidae, such as slender ambulatory legs, and other characteristics with Dytiscidae, such as large sensorial lobes on the epipharynx. In an analysis based on the genes 18S rRNA, 16S rRNA and cytochrome oxidase I, Amphizoidae was placed as a sister group of a clade comprising the newly described family Aspidytidae, Paelobiidae(=Hygrobiidae) and Dytiscidae. An analysis based on a morphological character matrix also came to this conclusion. However, two other studies with more genes have placed Amphizoidae as sister group to Aspidytidae. With Aspidytidae and Amphizoa share the same morphology of the apical part of the pro-sternal process and the mesocoxal cavities. The phylogeny within Amphizoa has been analysed in two studies based on morphological characters and they suggested that A. davidis is an isolated species and sister to the remaining four species as follows (A davidis, (A. insolens, (A. striata, (A. sinica & A. lecontei)))).

- Amphizoa
  - Amphizoa davidis
- - - Amphizoa insolens
  - - - Amphizoa striata
    - - - Amphizoa lecontei
      - - - Amphizoa sinica
