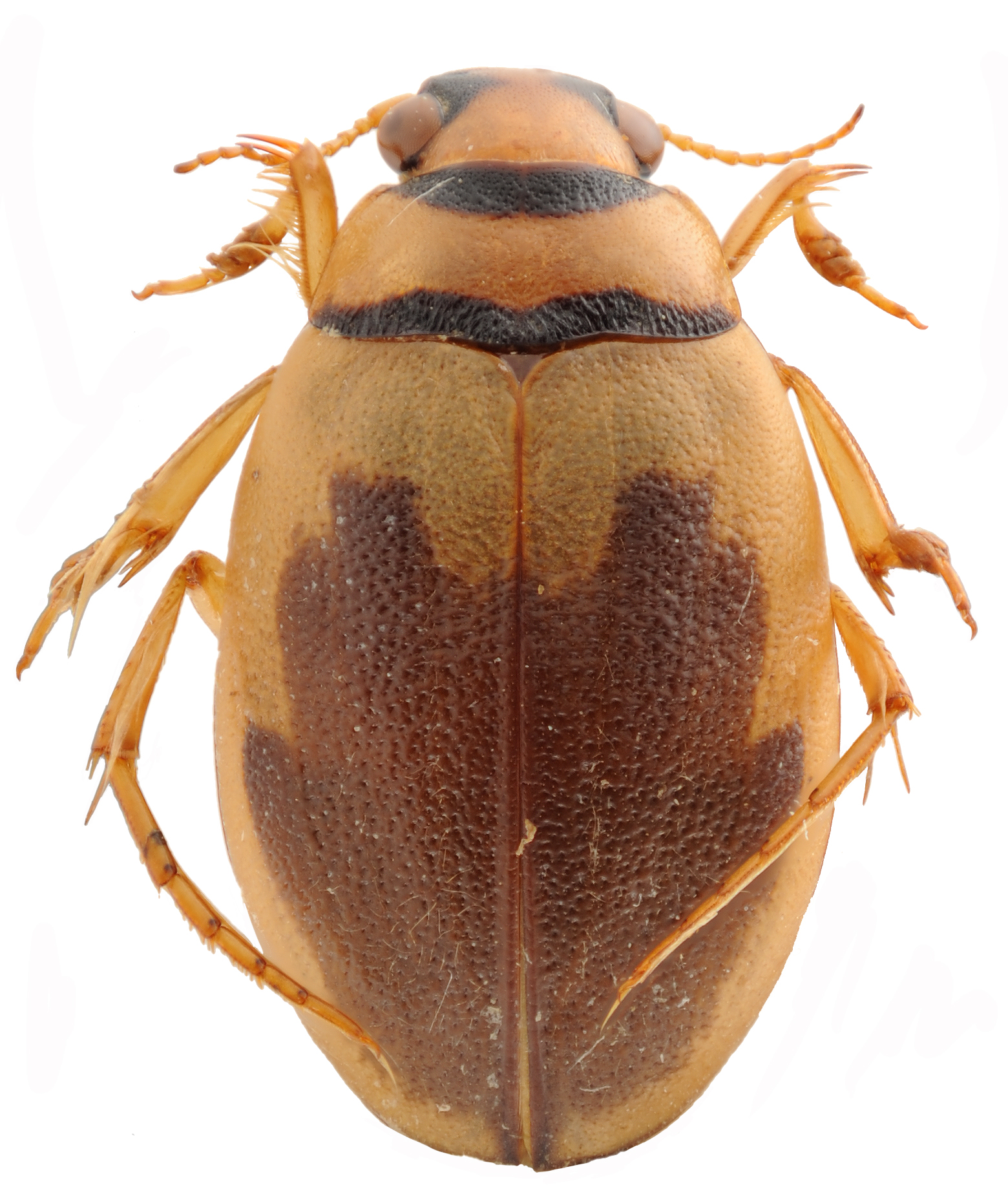
- Hygrobia hermanni

Scientific classification
- Kingdom: Animalia
- Phylum: Arthropoda
- Clade: Pancrustacea
- Class: Insecta
- Order: Coleoptera
- Suborder: Adephaga
- Family: Hygrobiidae
- Genus: Hygrobia; Latreille, 1804

Species
- Hygrobia australasiae (Clark, 1862); Hygrobia davidi Bedel, 1883; Hygrobia hermanni (Fabricius, 1775); Hygrobia maculata Britton, 1981; Hygrobia nigra (Clark, 1862); Hygrobia wattsi Hendrich, 2001

= Hygrobia =

Genus of beetles

Hygrobia is a genus of aquatic beetles native to Europe, North Africa, China and Australia. It is the only genus in the family Hygrobiidae, also known as the Paelobiidae. These are known commonly as squeak beetles or screech-beetles.

There are six known living species, with a highly disjunct distribution, and one extinct species, Hygrobia cretzschmari.

== Biology ==
All species occur in lowland areas and are mainly found in stagnant water. They live in the mud, silt, and detritus of ponds.

None of the species occur in sympatry, except for H. nigra and H. australasiae in south-eastern Australia.

Both adults and larvae are predators, specialized on oligochaete worms. The adults feed for as long as 30 min, coming to the surface very briefly to renew the air-supply.

Adults are able to stridulate, producing an audible sound, which is why they are called squeak or screech beetles.

== Morphology ==
The body length ranges from 8.0 to 11.0 mm. Compound eyes are present, not divided into ventral and dorsal portions, strongly protruding. Labrum is short and transverse. The antennae are filiform, almost glabrous, with 11 segments.

== Phylogeny and evolution ==
The monophyly of the family is not in doubt.

Hygrobiidae is thought to be the sister group to a clade comprising Dytiscidae (diving beetles), Amphizoidae (trout stream beetles) and Aspidytidae (cliff beetles), based on DNA sequence data.

Regarding the relationships among the species of Hygrobia, a recent phylogenetic analysis suggested a sister group relationship between H. hermanni and a clade formed by the Australian species, with H. nigra sister to H. australasiae.

Hygrobiidae probably diverged from other Hydradephagan clades around the time of the initial breakup of Pangea. The split between today's Palearctic and Australian clades occurred later, possibly in the middle Mesozoic, by dispersal events.

== Species diversity and distribution ==
Hygrobia australasiae (Clark, 1862) - Australia

Hygrobia davidi Bedel, 1883 - Jiangxi, southeastern China

Hygrobia hermanni (Fabricius, 1775) - Europe, northern Africa (Morocco, Algeria and Tunisia), and Israel

Hygrobia maculata Britton, 1981 - Australia

Hygrobia nigra (Clark, 1862) - Australia

Hygrobia wattsi Hendrich, 2001 - Australia

== Family name ==
There has been a controversy associated with deciding which is the valid family name of squeak beetles: Hygrobiidae or Paelobiidae. Paelobiidae has priority over Hygrobiidae, but the latter name was until recently much more widely used.
