= Notopleuron =

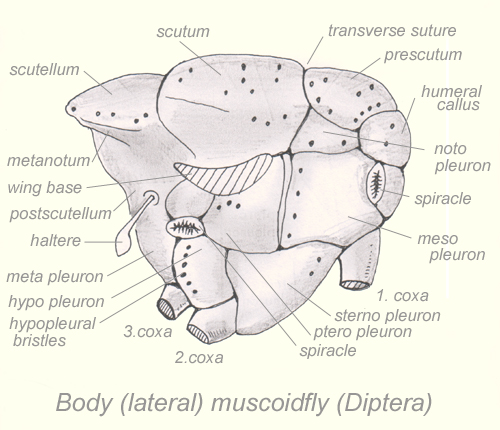
Diptera thorax: Notopleuron

The notopleuron (plural notopleura) is a region on an insect thorax. Notopleura are useful in characterizing species, particularly, though not uniquely, in the order Diptera (the "true flies"). The notopleuron is a thoracic pleurite (a sclerite on the pleuron) situated at the end of the transverse suture of Diptera.

Apart from in the Diptera, visible notopleural structures occur in the beetle suborder Adephaga and in certain Hemiptera, but this list is not exhaustive.
