= Colymbothetidae =

Scientific classification
- Domain: Eukaryota
- Kingdom: Animalia
- Phylum: Arthropoda
- Class: Insecta
- Order: Coleoptera
- Suborder: Adephaga
- Family: †Colymbothetidae; Ponomarenko, 1993

Genera
- †Colymbothetis Ponomarenko, 1993; †Mormolucoides Hitchcock, 1858

Family of beetles

Colymbothetidae is an extinct family of beetles in the suborder Adephaga. Colymbothethis is known from larvae from the Upper Triassic of Kazakhstan. They probably belong to the Dytiscoidea.
