= Meru phyllisae =

Scientific classification
- Kingdom: Animalia
- Phylum: Arthropoda
- Class: Insecta
- Order: Coleoptera
- Suborder: Adephaga
- Family: Meruidae; Spangler & Steiner, 2005
- Genus: Meru; Spangler & Steiner, 2005
- Species: M. phyllisae

Binomial name
- Meru phyllisae Spangler & Steiner, 2005

Genus of beetles

Meruidae is a family of aquatic beetles in the suborder Adephaga, with only one genus and species, Meru phyllisae. The beetle species was first found in the early 1980s. and fully described in 2005. At 0.8 mm (0.031 in), it is one of the smallest adephagan beetles in the world. A survey of aquatic beetles of Venezuela indicated that Meru is most common during the wet season, when larger areas of granitic rock surface are covered with water film, which the adult beetles as well as the larvae inhabit.

== Etymology ==
The name Meruidae comes from the local Pemon people word for waterfall, meru. The beetle was given this name because it can only be found in cascading water.

== Distribution ==
Meru phyllisae is only known from the natural cascading waterfalls in El Tobogán, Las Amazonas, Venezuela. Although it is a remote location that is strongly protected, Venezuelan tourists visit the place because of its uniqueness, causing habitat degradation.
