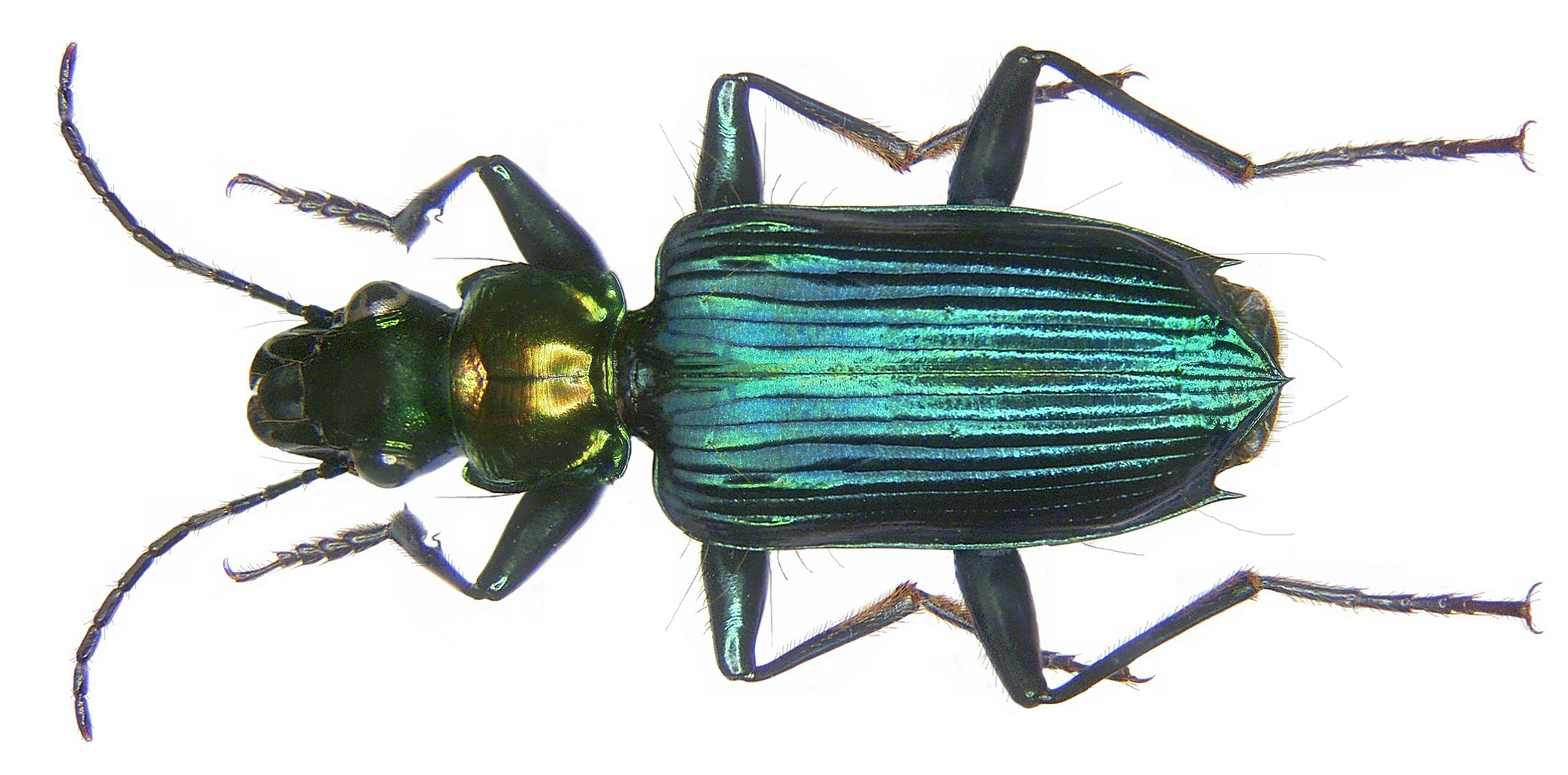
- Catascopus dalbertisi

Scientific classification
- Domain: Eukaryota
- Kingdom: Animalia
- Phylum: Arthropoda
- Class: Insecta
- Order: Coleoptera
- Suborder: Adephaga
- Family: Carabidae
- Subfamily: Lebiinae
- Tribe: Lebiini
- Subtribe: Pericalina
- Genus: Catascopus; Kirby, 1825

Subgenera
- Catascopoides Habu, 1967; Catascopus Kirby, 1825

= Catascopus =

Genus of beetles

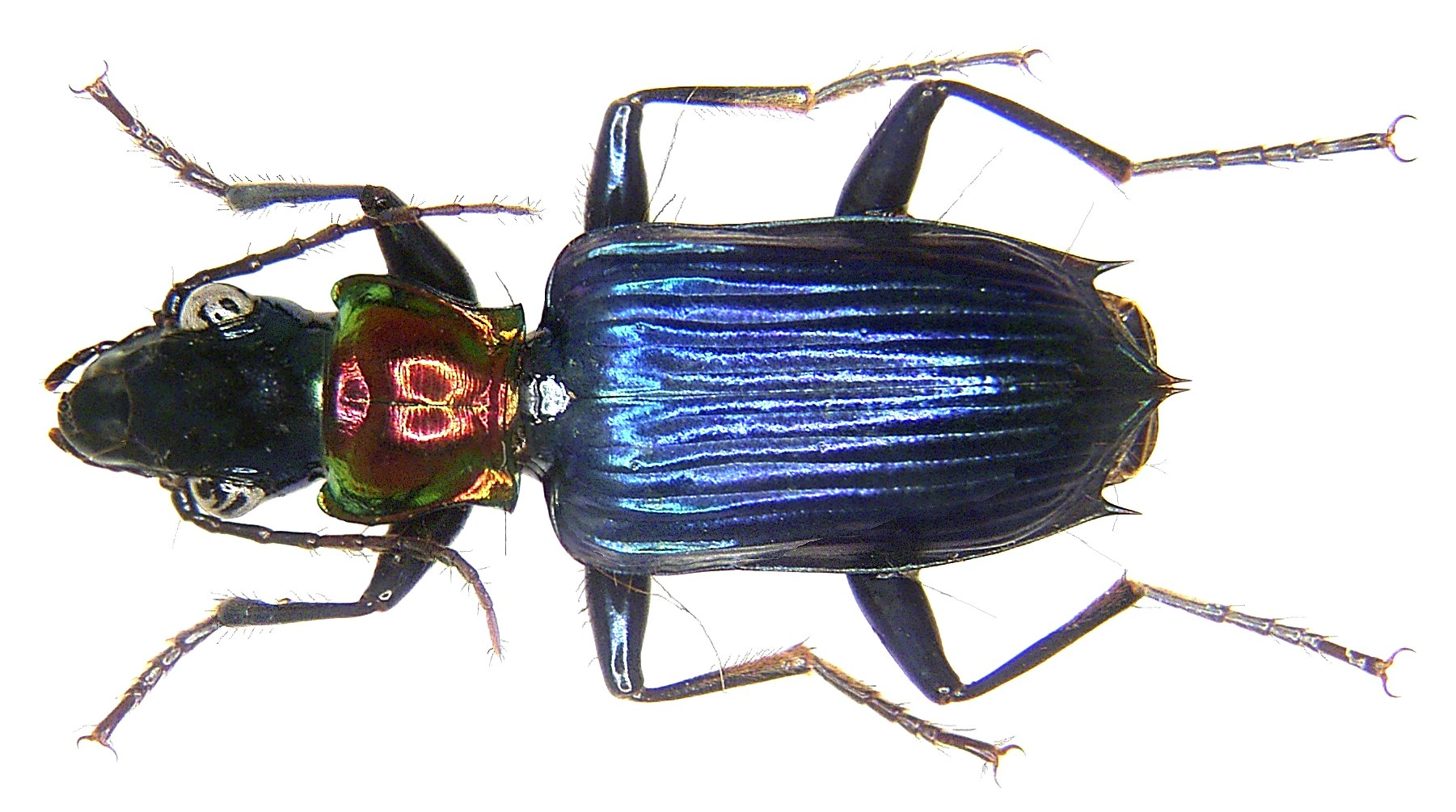
Catascopus wallacei

Catascopus is a genus in the beetle family Carabidae. There are more than 100 described species in Catascopus.

== Species ==
These 108 species belong to the genus Catascopus:

- Catascopus aculeatus Chaudoir, 1861
- Catascopus aeneus Saunders, 1863
- Catascopus aequatus Dejean, 1831
- Catascopus agnatus Chaudoir, 1872
- Catascopus alesi Jedlicka, 1935
- Catascopus andamanensis Chaudoir, 1877
- Catascopus andrewesi Louwerens, 1951
- Catascopus angulatus Chaudoir, 1861
- Catascopus angustatus Baehr, 2012
- Catascopus aruensis Saunders, 1863
- Catascopus asaharti Hunting & Yang, 2019
- Catascopus astrum Baehr, 2012
- Catascopus balthasari Jedlicka, 1935
- Catascopus beauvoisi Laporte, 1835
- Catascopus beccarii Straneo, 1943
- Catascopus bellus Andrewes, 1921
- Catascopus biroi Darlington, 1968
- Catascopus borneensis Baehr, 2012
- Catascopus brachypterus Chaudoir, 1861
- Catascopus brasiliensis Dejean, 1831
- Catascopus brevispinosus Sloane, 1910
- Catascopus brunneus Darlington, 1968
- Catascopus bryanti Andrewes, 1921
- Catascopus carinipennis Baehr, 2012
- Catascopus chalydicus Olliff, 1885
- Catascopus chaudoiri Laporte, 1867
- Catascopus cingalensis Bates, 1886
- Catascopus clarus Andrewes, 1930
- Catascopus cuprascens Baehr, 2012
- Catascopus cupripennis J.Thomson, 1857
- Catascopus cyanellus Chaudoir, 1848
- Catascopus cyanoviridis Baehr, 2012
- Catascopus dalbertisi Straneo, 1943
- Catascopus defanisi Straneo, 1994
- Catascopus diffinis Chaudoir, 1872
- Catascopus dobodura Darlington, 1968
- Catascopus elegans (Weber, 1801)
- Catascopus elegantulus Jedlicka, 1935
- Catascopus elevatus Schmidt-Goebel, 1846
- Catascopus erwini Straneo, 1994
- Catascopus facialis (Wiedemann, 1819)
- Catascopus femoratus Baehr, 2012
- Catascopus fraterculus Baehr, 2012
- Catascopus fuscoaeneus Chaudoir, 1872
- Catascopus grimmi Baehr, 2012
- Catascopus hardwickei Kirby, 1825
- Catascopus hexagonus Straneo, 1994
- Catascopus hinei Straneo, 1994
- Catascopus horni Jedlicka, 1932
- Catascopus ignicinctus Bates, 1883
- Catascopus illustris Andrewes, 1937
- Catascopus impressipennis Baehr, 2012
- Catascopus jenkinsi Andrewes, 1937
- Catascopus keralensis Straneo, 1994
- Catascopus laevigatus Saunders, 1863
- Catascopus laevipennis Saunders, 1863
- Catascopus laotinus Andrewes, 1921
- Catascopus laticollis W.J.MacLeay, 1883
- Catascopus latimargo Straneo, 1994
- Catascopus latus Darlington, 1968
- Catascopus lissonotus Andrewes, 1921
- Catascopus lumawigi Straneo, 1994
- Catascopus magnicollis Baehr, 2012
- Catascopus marani Jedlicka, 1935
- Catascopus mirabilis Bates, 1892
- Catascopus moorei Straneo, 1994
- Catascopus obscuroviridis Chevrolat, 1835
- Catascopus pecirkai Jedlicka, 1935
- Catascopus phlogops Andrewes, 1926
- Catascopus platypennis Baehr, 2012
- Catascopus presidens (J.Thomson, 1857)
- Catascopus punctatostriatus Baehr, 2012
- Catascopus punctipennis Saunders, 1863
- Catascopus quadrispina Straneo, 1994
- Catascopus regalis Schmidt-Goebel, 1846
- Catascopus rex Darlington, 1968
- Catascopus riedeli Baehr, 1997
- Catascopus rufifemoratus Chaudoir, 1837
- Catascopus rufipes Gory, 1833
- Catascopus saphyrinus Andrewes, 1921
- Catascopus sauteri Dupuis, 1914
- Catascopus savagei Hope, 1842
- Catascopus schaumi Saunders, 1863
- Catascopus senegalensis Dejean, 1831
- Catascopus sidus Darlington, 1968
- Catascopus similaris Xie & Yu, 1992
- Catascopus simillimus Straneo, 1994
- Catascopus simplex Chaudoir, 1872
- Catascopus smaragdulus Dejean, 1825
- Catascopus specularis Imhoff, 1843
- Catascopus strigicollis Straneo, 1943
- Catascopus strigifrons Baehr, 2012
- Catascopus subquadratus Motschulsky, 1865
- Catascopus thailandicus Straneo, 1994
- Catascopus uelensis Burgeon, 1930
- Catascopus validus Chaudoir, 1854
- Catascopus versicolor Saunders, 1863
- Catascopus violaceus Schmidt-Goebel, 1846
- Catascopus virens Chaudoir, 1872
- Catascopus viridicupreus Jedlicka, 1935
- Catascopus viridiorchis Hunting & Yang, 2019
- Catascopus viridis Jedlicka, 1935
- Catascopus vitalisi Dupuis, 1914
- Catascopus vollenhoveni Chaudoir, 1872
- Catascopus waigeoensis Baehr, 2012
- Catascopus wallacei Saunders, 1863
- Catascopus weigeli Baehr, 2012
- Catascopus whithillii Hope, 1838
