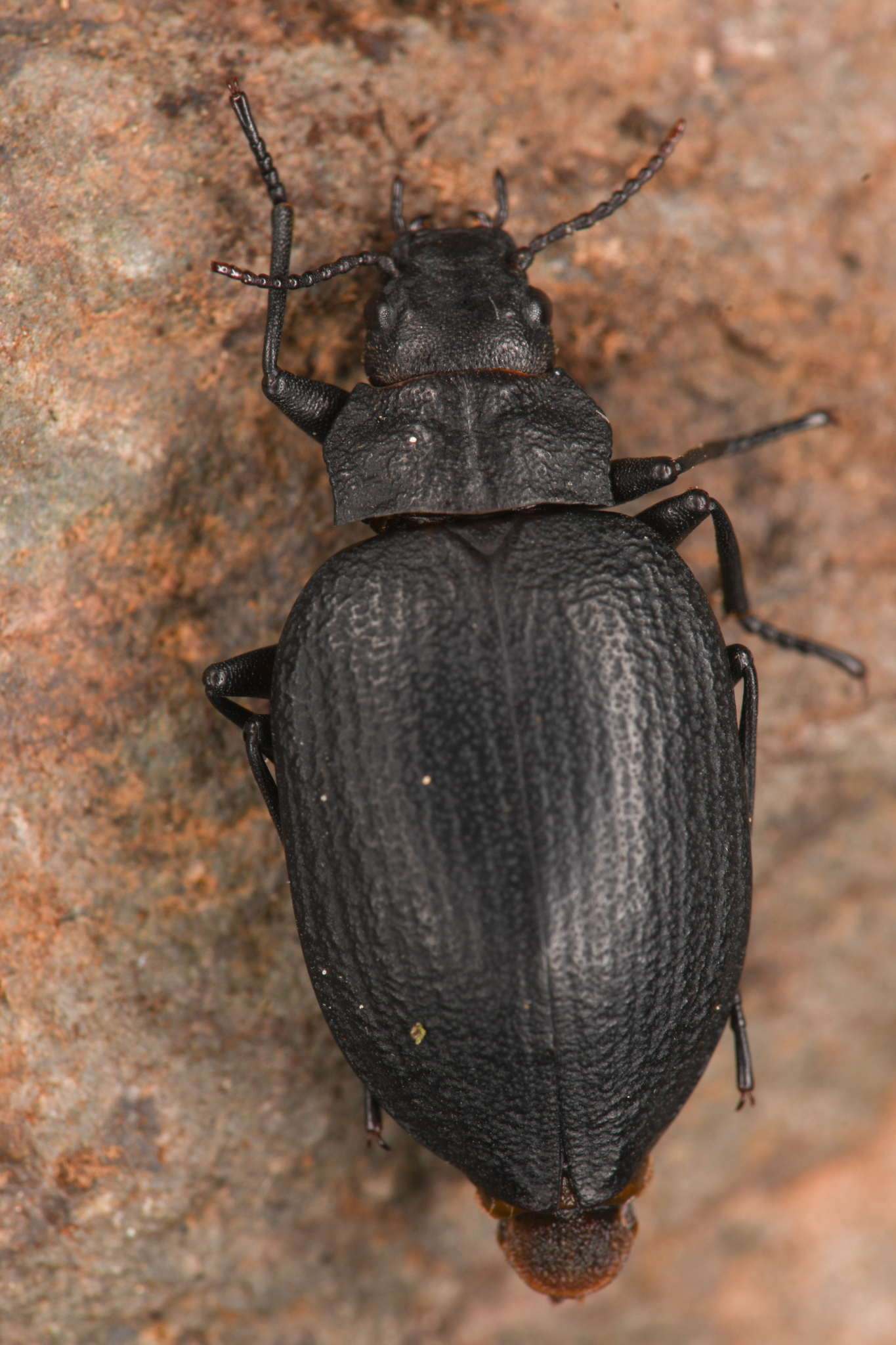

Scientific classification
- Domain: Eukaryota
- Kingdom: Animalia
- Phylum: Arthropoda
- Class: Insecta
- Order: Coleoptera
- Suborder: Adephaga
- Family: Amphizoidae
- Genus: Amphizoa
- Species: A. insolens

Binomial name
- Amphizoa insolens LeConte, 1853

= Amphizoa insolens =

Species of beetle

Amphizoa insolens is a species of aquatic beetles. It is found in North America from Alaska to southern California.

Adult A. insolens beetles are between 10.9 and 15 millimeters long. Their front tarsi lack well-developed grooves with hair-like setae.
