= Amphizoa lecontei =

Scientific classification
- Domain: Eukaryota
- Kingdom: Animalia
- Phylum: Arthropoda
- Class: Insecta
- Order: Coleoptera
- Suborder: Adephaga
- Family: Amphizoidae
- Genus: Amphizoa
- Species: A. lecontei

Binomial name
- Amphizoa lecontei Matthews, 1872

Species of beetle

Amphizoa lecontei is a species of aquatic beetle. Adults have a body length of between 11.5 and 16 millimeters. Its elytron has a distinct carina on fifth interval. The species is found in western North America, especially in the Rocky Mountains. Its common name is "Trout-stream beetle". Its synonym is Amphizoa carinata.
