= Algophagy =

Obtaining nutrients by consuming algae

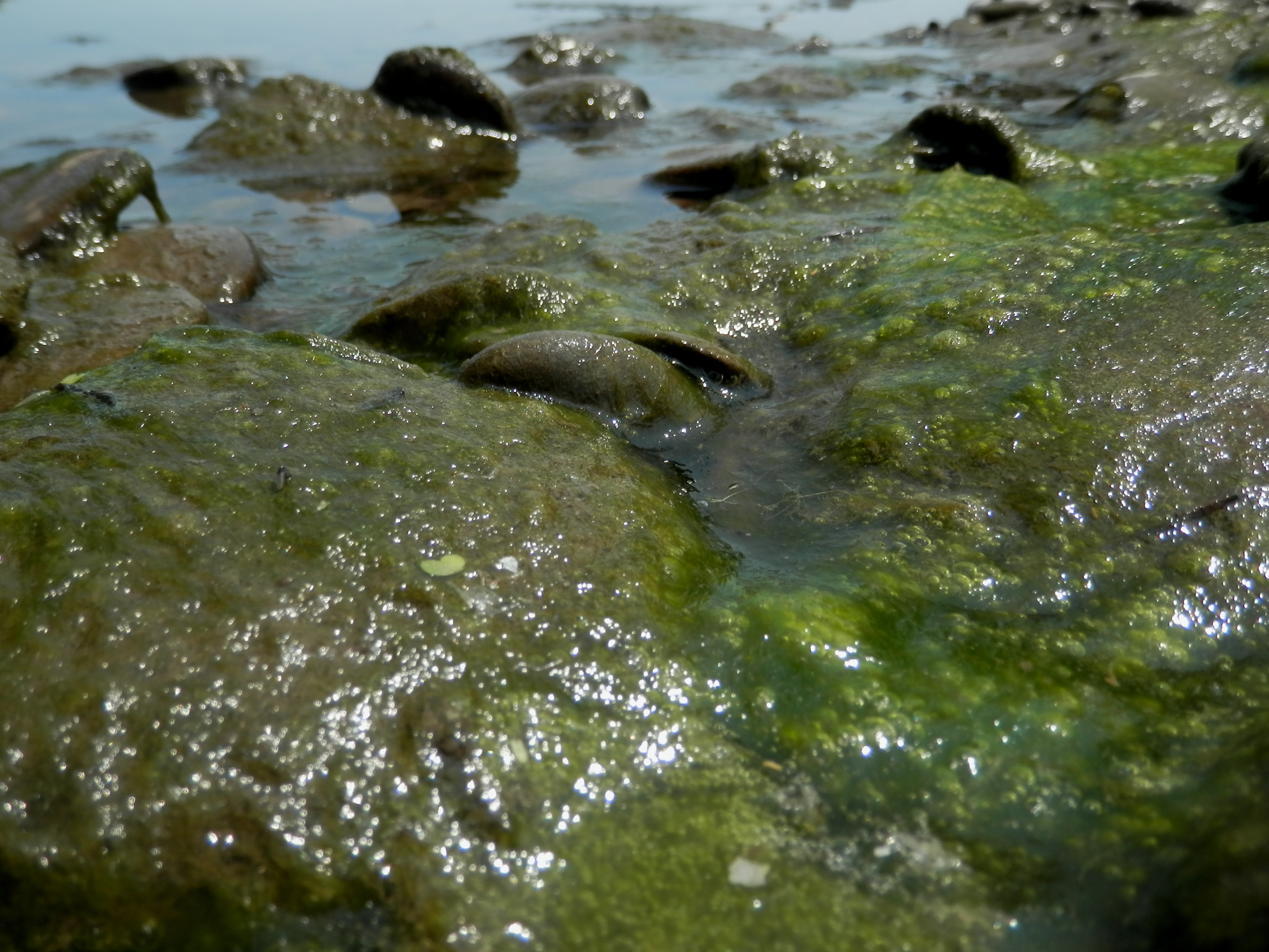
Algae on Rocks – Mississauga

Algophagy is a feeding behaviour whereby an animal eats algae as a food source. Algae is a group of photosynthetic organisms that mostly rely on aquatic environments. They grow low to the ground as they lack vascular tissue, an adaptation postdating their origin. While the group of algal species is large, it is generally accepted that algae is high in nutritional value and often contain a variety of concentrated vitamins and minerals.

Algophagy as a feeding behaviour was first noted in literature by Deonier (1972) in their explanation of feeding habits of shore flies (Ephydridae). In this context, this term was used to describe the behaviour of these flies consuming and digesting algal matter. This feeding style has also been noted in other animals in recent literature.

While this behaviour has been noted in a variety of insects (specifically Ameletus mayflies), it has also been observed in other invertebrates such as the crab Carcinus maenas and the Nanorchestes mite. Additionally, this behaviour has been noted in vertebrates such as the chimpanzee Pan troglodytes, the sheep Ovis aries, and the chicken Gallus gallus domesticus. This feeding behaviour has more recently been adopted by humans as well.

== Examples in invertebrates ==
Algophagy is a feeding behaviour found commonly amongst many invertebrate species. Some examples of these observations include the mayfly, mites, and certain species of crab.

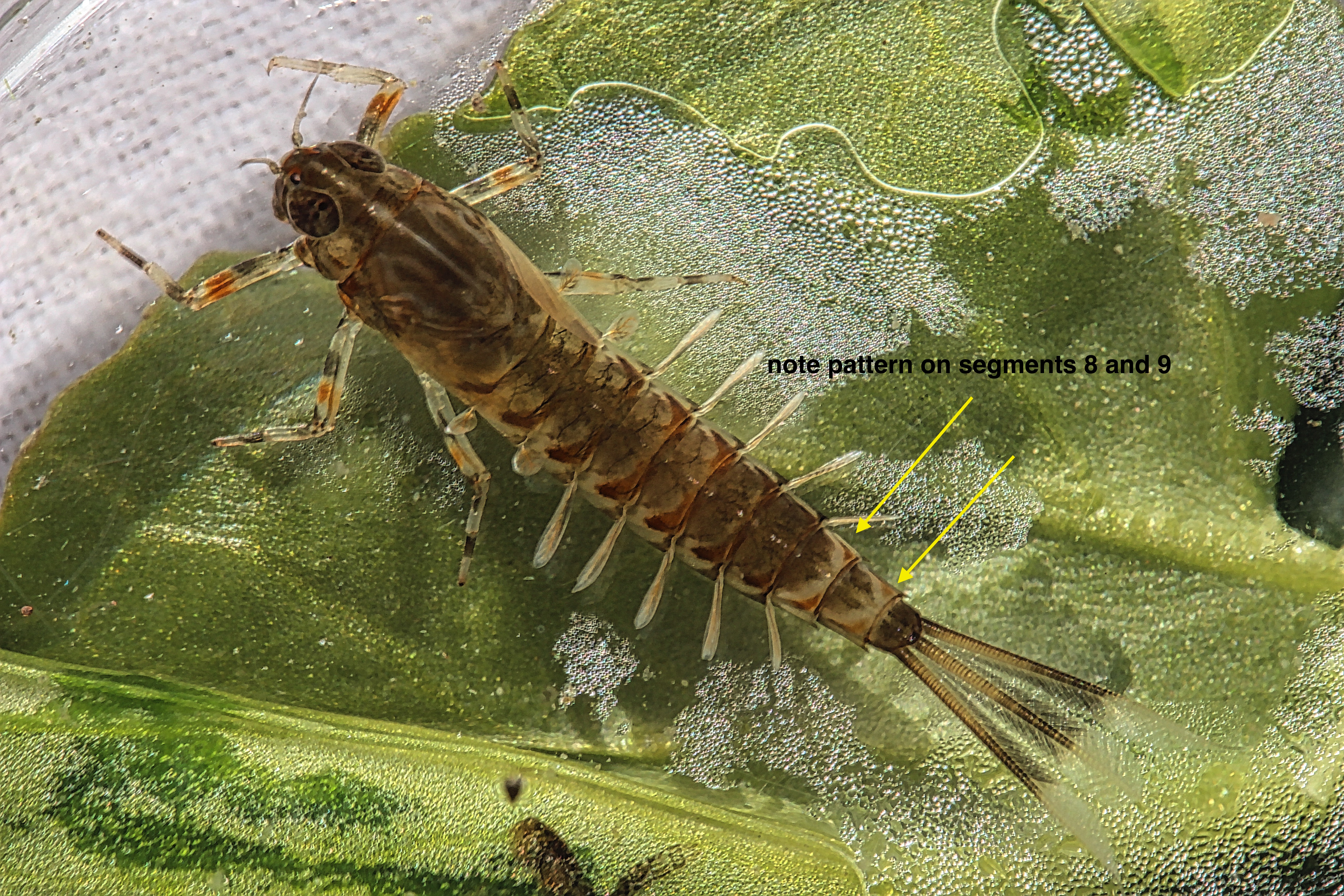
Ameletus mayfly in an algae bed

Mayflies are a group of insects found to feed off of epilithic algae from near streams in New Mexico, United States. In a study to examine ingestion and digestion of algae by larval insects, Peterson (1998) analyzed the fecal composition of varying insect larvae and nymphs. All species studied showed epilithic algae in their fecal matter, markedly in the multiple species of mayfly. This study outlines the feeding behaviours used by specifically the Ameletus mayflies to feed off of and digest algae as a source of food.

This behaviour has also been noted in species of mites. The Nanorchestes mite is a small invertebrate of the genus Pachygnathoid that lives in the ground and is often found in extremophilic conditions. Krantz and Lindquist (1979) made observations of these mites feeding and surviving off of green algae, while also delving into the background theory behind this. The authors argue that algal microflora predates that of vascular plants, a step to understanding the evolutionary pathway that follows algophagy. Because of this flora timeline, the mites relied on algae as an early source of nutrition.

Algophagy also occurs in certain species of crab. The green crab is a highly invasive species found on nearly all continents of Earth. This littoral crab is an omnivore with a large array of preferred foods, forming an important ecological connection with many ocean environments. In a study performed by Ropes (1968), 3,979 green crabs were sampled and their gut contents were analyzed to reveal that algae was one of the two consumed plant foods. This was replicated in other studies such as that of Baeta, Cabral, Marques, and Pardal (2006) who also found these results nearly 40 years later.

== Examples in non-human vertebrates ==
Algophagy has been observed in a variety of vertebrate species, such as the chimpanzee, species of sheep, and also in the common chicken.

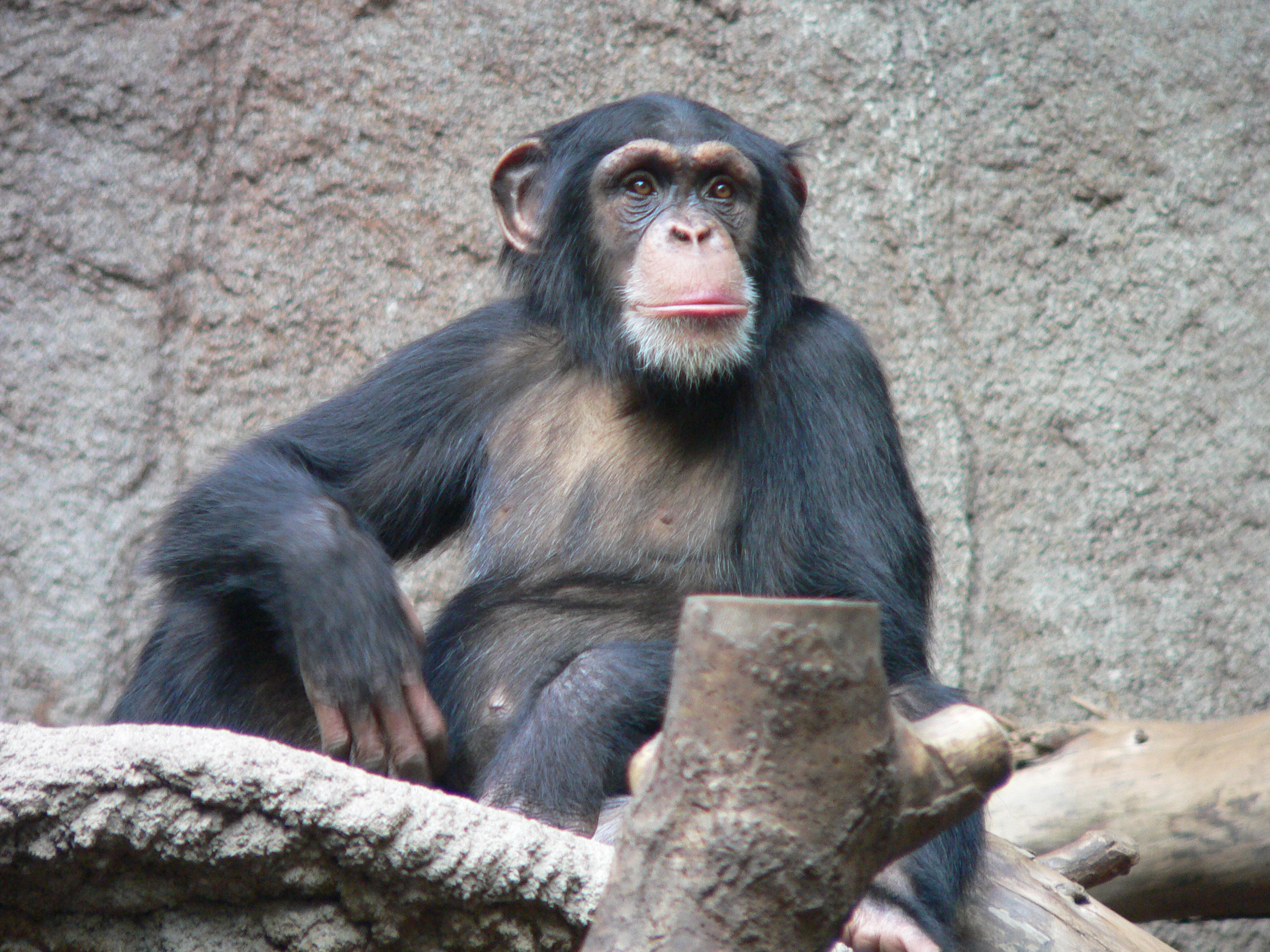
A chimpanzee species found to consume algae

The chimpanzee is a primate in the same family as humans and are native to sub-Saharan Africa. While many chimpanzees are naturally hydrophobic, Sakamaki (1998) found that those in Mahale have been observed to submerge themselves into freshwater and eat algae. This observation is the first documentation of a primate using algae in the wild as a food source and is an important marker of possible adaptation in the species. While the chimpanzee in question, Sally, was one of the only algae-eaters in her group, it was assumed that she had adopted this behaviour from her natal group prior to immigrating to this new environment. Nonetheless, this anecdotal field study highlights the act of eating algae in chimpanzees.

Another example here is found in certain species of sheep. The North Ronaldsay sheep is native to the island of Orkney off of Scotland and had been bred for wool until recently being listed as a vulnerable population. This species relies heavily on tidal algae as outlined by Paterson and Coleman (1982). The researchers here observed the sheep feeding largely on brown algae, commonly known as seaweed. The sheep relied on the tides to expose the nutrient rich algae and when the tides made the food inaccessible, the sheep supported their diet with other forms of grazing.

Algophagy also been observed in the common chicken as well. When the Poultry Department of the University of Maryland did an assay of dried Chlorella pyrenoidosa, they found it to be a rich nutrient source that could be substituted into the diet of chickens. The researcher behind this outlined the benefits of using this food replacement for chickens in that it improved growth and wellbeing of the chicken. While this example is not a natural one, it does outline the use of algae as a food source for domestic chickens, an important consideration in the future of both algophagy and agriculture.

== Algophagy in humans ==
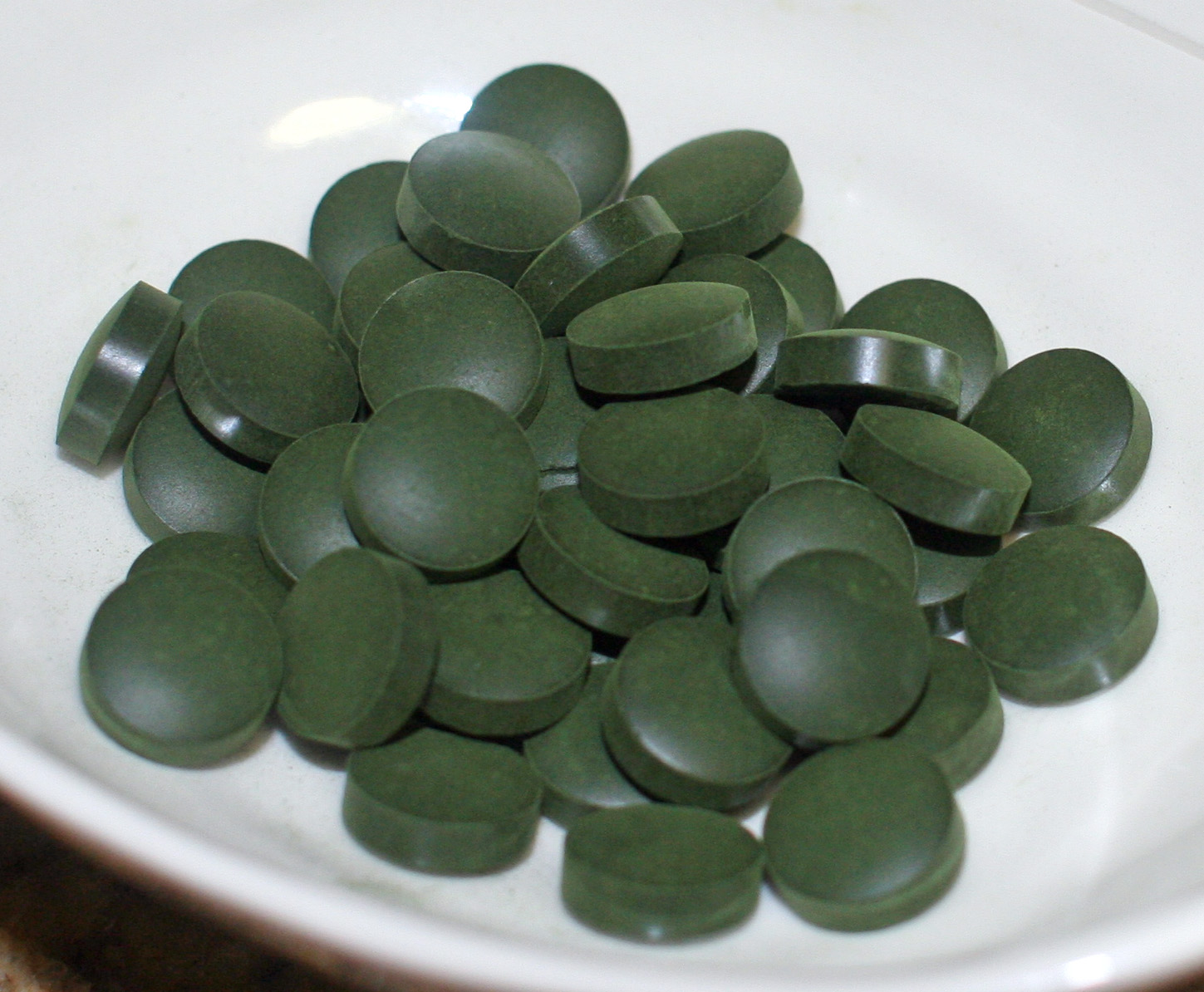
Spirulina tablets used for human consumption

While this feeding behaviour is not commonly associated with human evolution or adaptation, it has gained some momentum in recent application. New dieting and food trends have veered towards the inclusion of spirulina into supplements. Spirulina is a bacterium, but mostly referred to as blue-green algae, that is used to supplement a variety of nutrients including essential proteins, vitamins, and minerals. In a past review of spirulina by Belay, Ota, Miyakawa, and Shimamatsu (1993), it was outlined that the algae could even be correlated to reduced risk of cholesterol problems, cancer, and heavy metal nephrotoxicity. Spirulina is relatively popular among dietary supplement enthusiasts and can be used in a varied of forms from capsules, to smoothies, to baked goods. This outlines a contemporary example of algophagy in humans.

== See also ==
- Glossary of entomology terms
- Eating behaviour in Insects
- Animal behaviour
- Feeding behaviour
