= Eating behavior in insects =

Insects are among the most diverse groups of animals on the planet, including more than a million described species and representing more than half of all known living organisms. The number of extant species is estimated at between six and ten million, found in nearly all environments, although only a small number of species occur in the oceans. This large extant means that the dietary habits of taxa include a large variety of behaviors.

== Insect mouthparts ==
The development of insect mouthparts from the primitive chewing mouthparts of a grasshopper in the centre (A), to the lapping type (B) and the siphoning type (C). Legend: a - antennae c - compound eye lb -labium lr - labrum md - mandibles mx - maxillae.

The insect mouthparts consist of the maxilla, labium, and in some species the mandibles. The labrum is a simple fused sclerite, often called the upper lip, and moves longitudinally, which is hinged to the clypeus. The mandibles (jaws) are a highly sclerotized pair of structures that move at right angles to the body; used for biting, chewing and severing food. The maxillae are paired structures that can also move at right angles to the body and possess segmented palps. The labium (lower lip) is the fused structure that moves longitudinally and possesses a pair of segmented palps.

The mouthparts, along with the rest of the head, can be articulated in at least three different positions: prognathous, opisthognathous and hypognathous. In species with prognathous articulation, the head is positioned vertically aligned with the body, such as species of Formicidae; while in a hypognathous type, the head is aligned horizontally adjacent to the body. In an opisthognathous head, it was positioned diagonally, such as species of Blattodea and some Coleopterans. The mouthparts vary greatly among insects of different orders but there are two main functional groups: mandibulate and haustellate. Haustellate mouthparts are those used for sucking liquids and can be further classified, by the presence of stylets, which include: piercing-sucking, sponging, and siphoning. The stylets are needle-like projections used to penetrate plant and animal tissue. The stylets and the feeding tube form the modified mandibles, maxilla, and hypopharynx.

- Mandibulate: These forms of mouthparts are among the most common in insects, which are used for biting and grinding solid foods.
- Piercing-sucking: These forms of mouthparts have stylets, and are used to penetrate solid tissue and then suck up liquid food.
- Sponging: These forms of mouthparts are used to sponge and suck liquids and lack stylets (e.g. most Diptera).
- Siphoning: These forms of mouthparts lack stylets and are used to suck liquids, which are commonly found among species of Lepidoptera.

Mouthparts that are mandibular are found in species of Odonata, Blattodea, adult Neuroptera, Coleoptera, Hymenoptera, Orthoptera, and Lepidoptera. However most adult Lepidoptera have siphoning mouthparts, while the larvae (commonly called caterpillars) are the ones with the mandibles.

== Measurement ==
Drosophila melanogaster has a long history of use as a model organism for genetic studies. However, as of 2014 the quantitative analysis of feeding behavior remains "challenging" and it is "often ignored or poorly characterized". Among many methods, the most commonly applied are capillary feeder (CAFE), radioactive tracer labeling in food, dye tracer labeling in food and counting of proboscis extension (PE) events.

== See also ==
- Glossary of entomology terms
