= Nigel E. Stork =

Entomologist

- Scientific career
- Fields: Entomology; Ecology; Biodiversity
- Institutions: Griffith University; University of Melbourne; Natural History Museum, London

Nigel E. Stork is a scientist with a special interest in entomology and biological diversity. He is a Professor Emeritus at Griffith University in south east Queensland, Australia, and works as a Member of the Centre for Planetary Health and Food Security.

Stork was a member of the Environmental Futures Research Institute at Griffith University from 2015 to 2020. Stork previously was Head of the Department of Resource Management and Geography at the University of Melbourne (2007-2011). From 1980 to 1995 Stork worked at the Natural History Museum, London.

One of Stork's notable works is estimating how many animal species exist on Earth based upon research in the Coleoptera (beetle) collections at the Natural History Museum, London. Stork researched with Coleoptera as it is the most speciose order known (roughly 25% of all described species are beetles). Stork used methods like measuring the body size of beetle specimens, assuming that larger species would have been discovered and described by taxonomists first - and that analyzing sizes and dates / rates of discovery would allow for an estimate of non-described species to be made.

== Select publications ==
- Stork, N.E.: The adherence of beetle tarsal setae to glass, Journal of Natural History, volume 17, issue 4, pages 583-597 (1983)
- Paarmann, Wilfried & Stork, Nigel E.: Seasonality of Ground Beetles (Coleoptera:Carabidae) in the Rain Forests of N. Sulawesi (Indonesia), International Journal of Tropical Insect Science, 8, pages 483-487 (1987)
- Russell-Smith, A & Stork, N.E.: Abundance and diversity of spiders from the canopy of tropical rainforests with particular reference to Sulawesi, Indonesia, Journal of Tropical Ecology, volume 10, issue 4, pages 545-558 (1994)
- Adis, Joachim; Stork, Nigel E. & Didham, Raphael K.: Canopy Arthropods (1997)
- Stork, Nigel E.: Re-assessing current extinction rates, Biodiversity and Conservation, 19, pages 357-371 (2009)
- Stork, Nigel E.; McBroom, James; Gely, Claire & Hamilton, Andrew J.: New approaches narrow global species estimates for beetles, insects, and terrestrial arthropods, PNAS, volume 112, number 24 (2015)
- McCaig, Timothy; Sam, Legi; Nakamura, Akihiro & Stork, Nigel: Is insect vertical distribution in rainforests better explained by distance from the canopy top or distance from the ground? Biodiversity and Conservation, 29 (9) (2020)
