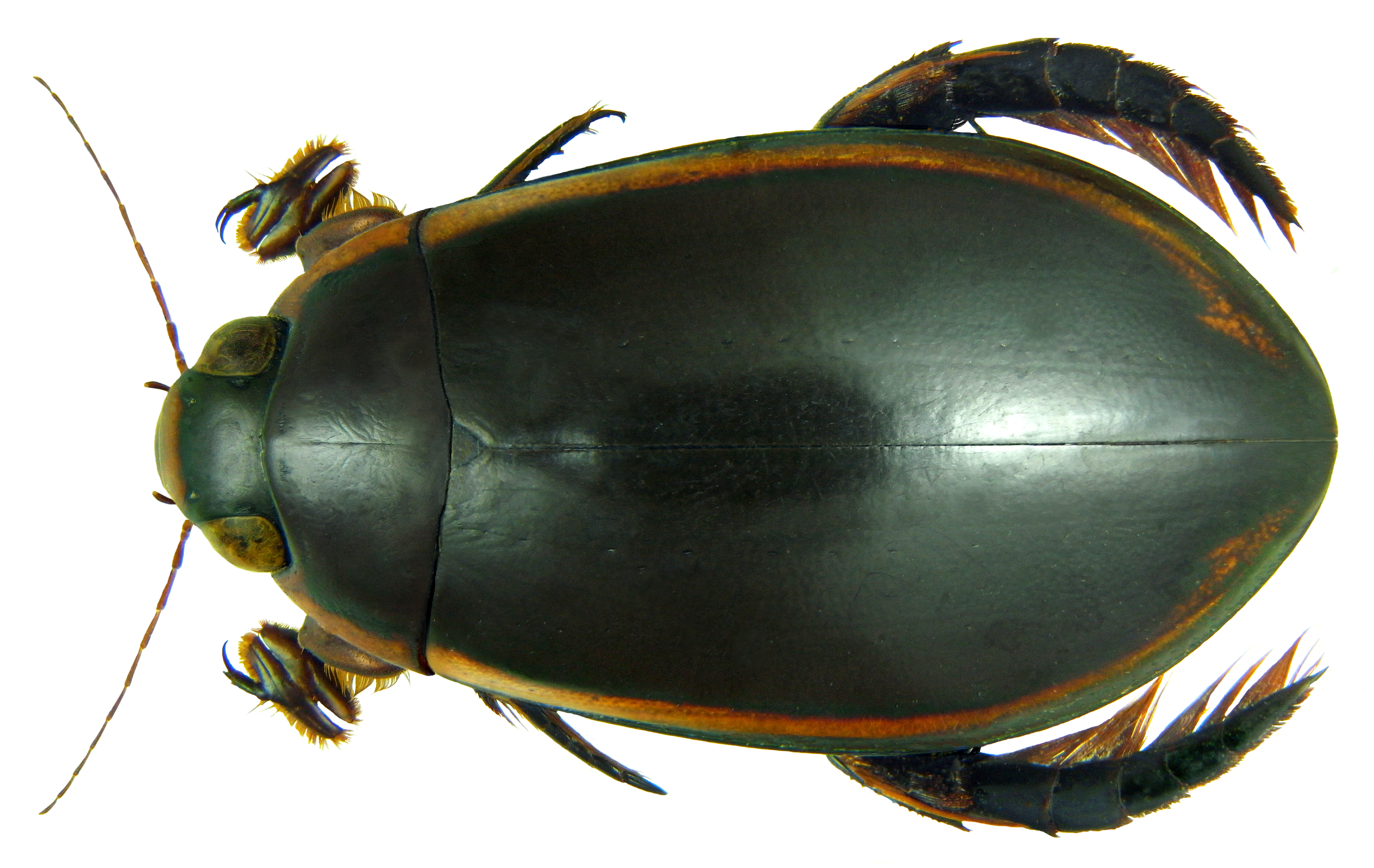
- Cybister limbatus, a member of the family Dytiscidae (predaceous diving beetle)
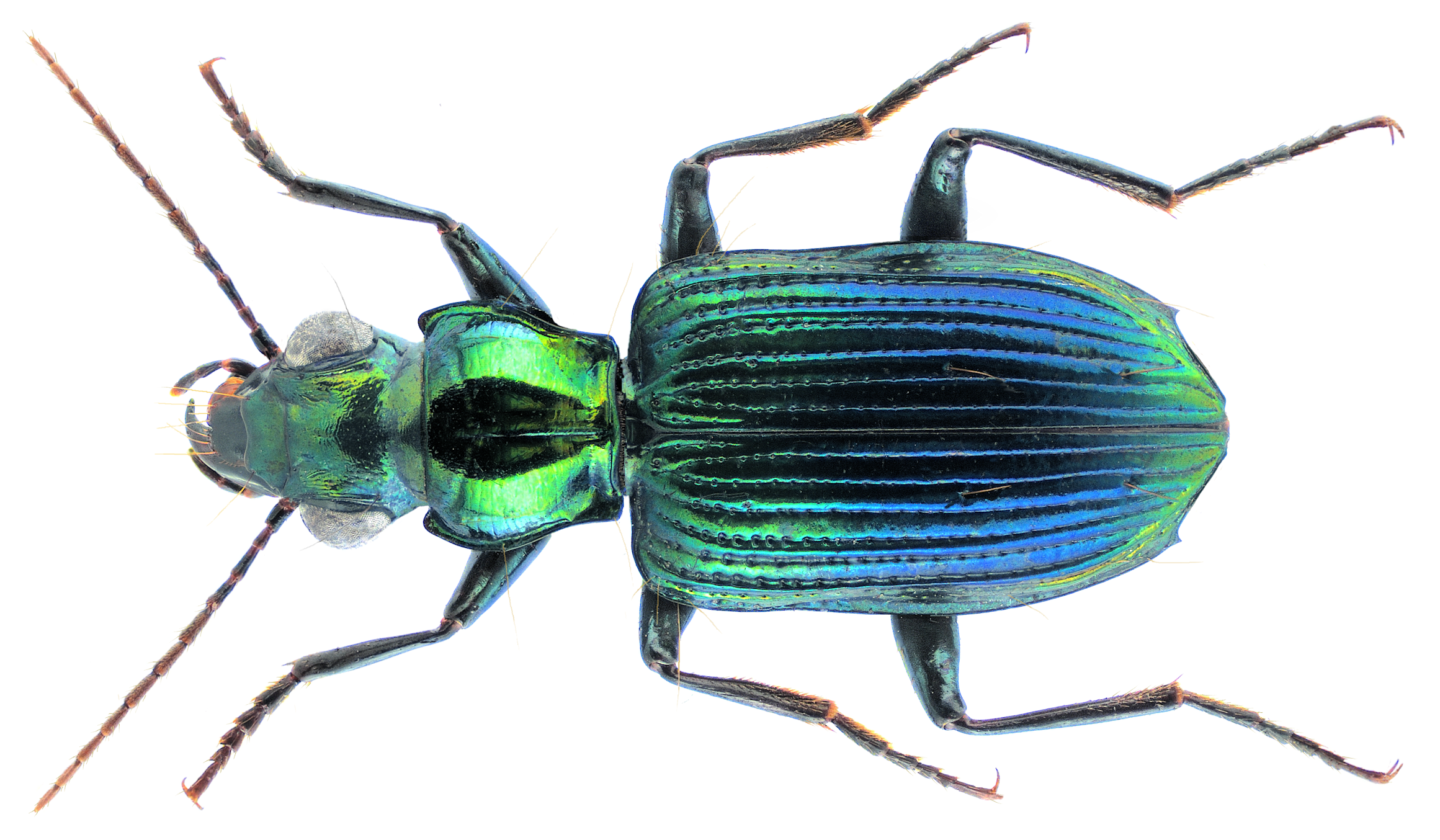
- Catascopus facialis a member of the family Carabidae (ground beetles)

Scientific classification
- Kingdom: Animalia
- Phylum: Arthropoda
- Clade: Pancrustacea
- Class: Insecta
- Order: Coleoptera
- Suborder: Adephaga; Schellenberg, 1806

Families
- Gyrinidae (whirligig beetles); Geadephaga; Carabidae (ground beetles); Cicindelidae (tiger beetles); Trachypachidae; †Triaplidae; Haliplidae; Dytiscoidea; Amphizoidae; Aspidytidae; Dytiscidae (diving beetles); Hygrobiidae; Meruidae; Noteridae; †Coptoclavidae; †Parahygrobiidae; †Liadytidae; †Colymbothetidae

= Adephaga =

Adephaga Temporal range: Changhsingian/Induan–Holocene, 251.2–0 Ma

Suborder of beetles

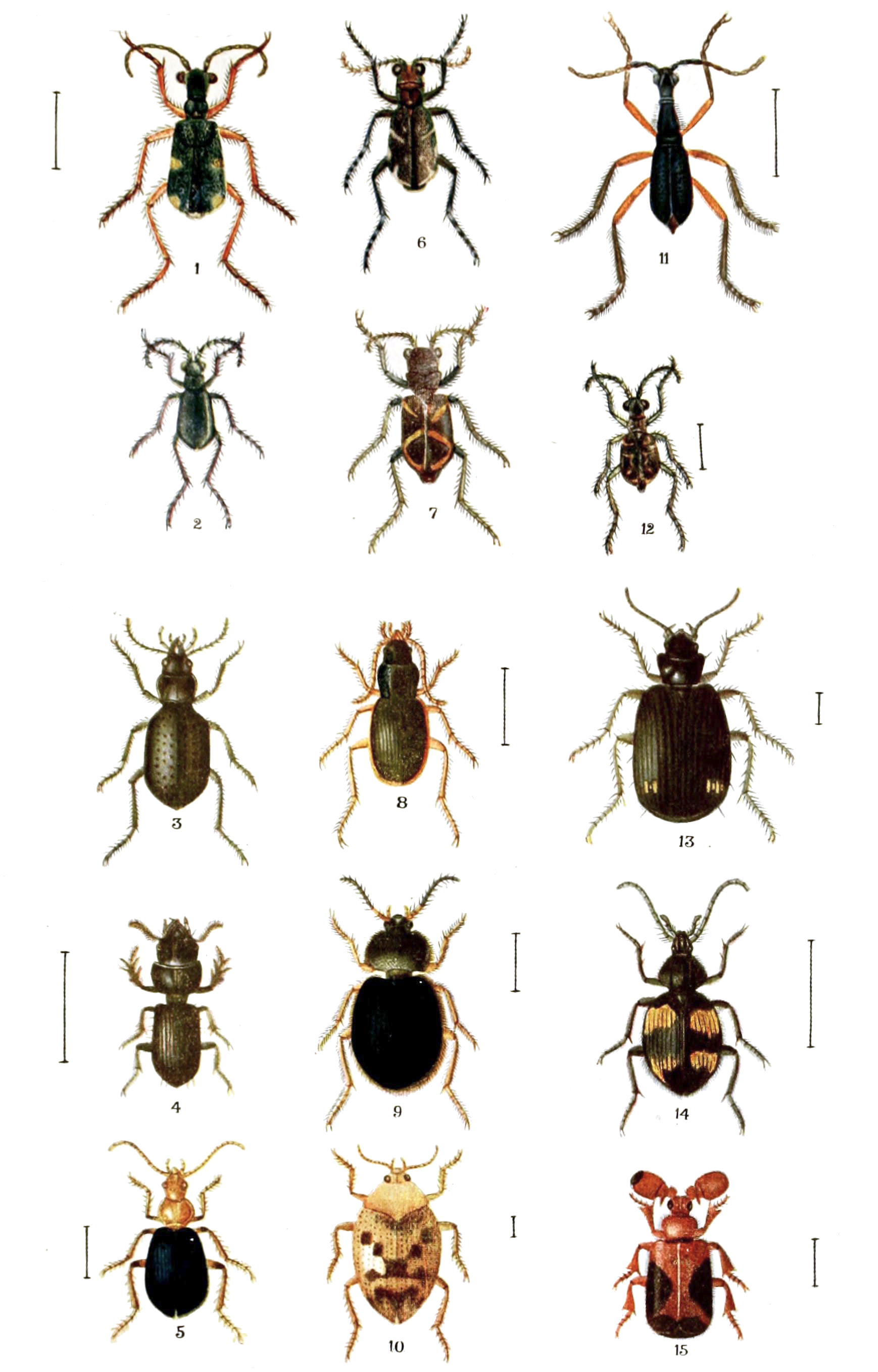
Image by Harold Maxwell-Lefroy - Adephaga

The Adephaga (from Greek ἀδηφάγος, adephagos, "gluttonous") are a suborder of beetles, and with more than 40,000 recorded species in 10 families, the second-largest of the four beetle suborders. Members of this suborder are collectively known as adephagans. The largest family is Carabidae (ground beetles) which comprises most of the suborder with over 40,000 species. Adephaga also includes a variety of aquatic beetles, such as predaceous diving beetles and whirligig beetles.

== Anatomy ==
Adephagans have simple antennae with no pectination or clubs. The galeae of the maxillae usually consist of two segments. Adult adephagans have visible notopleural sutures. The first visible abdominal sternum is completely separated by the hind coxae, which is one of the most easily recognizable traits of adephagans. Five segments are on each foot.

=== Wings ===
The transverse fold of the hind wing is near the wing tip. The median nervure ends at this fold, where it is joined by a cross nervure.

=== Internal organs ===
Adephagans have four Malpighian tubules. Unlike the genetical structures of other beetles, yolk chambers alternate with egg chambers in the ovarian tubes of adephagans. The coiled, tubular testes consist of a single follicle, and the ovaries are polytrophic.

== Chemical glands ==
All families of adephagan have paired pygidial glands located posterodorsally in the abdomen, which are used for secreting chemicals. The glands consist of complex invaginations of the cuticle lined with epidermal cells contiguous with the integument. The glands have no connection with the rectum and open on the eighth abdominal tergum.

Secretions pass from the secretory lobes, which are aggregations of secretory cells, through a tube to a reservoir lined with muscles. This reservoir then narrows to a tube leading to an opening valve. The secretory lobes differ structurally from one taxon to another; it may be elongated or oval, branched basally or apically, or unbranched.

== Delivery of glandular compounds ==
Secretion can occur in multiple manners:

- Oozing: if the gland is not muscle-lined, the discharge is limited in amount.
- Spraying: if the gland is muscle-lined, which is typically the case of carabids, the substances are ejected more or less forcefully.
- Crepitation: boiling noxious chemical spray ejected with a popping sound. Crepitation is only associated with the Brachininae carabids and several related species. See bombardier beetle for a detailed description.

The secretions differ in the chemical constituents, according to the taxa. Gyrinids, for instance, secrete norsesquiterpenes such as gyrinidal, gyrinidione, or gyrinidone. Dytiscids discharge aromatic aldehydes, esters, and acids, especially benzoic acid. Carabids typically produce carboxylic acids, particularly formic acid, methacrylic acid, and tiglic acid, but also aliphatic ketones, saturated esters, phenols, aromatic aldehydes, and quinones.

Accessory glands or modified structures are present in some taxa: the Dytiscidae and Hygrobiidae also possess paired prothoracic glands secreting steroids; and the Gyrinidae are unique in the extended shape of the external opening of the pygidial gland.

The function of many compounds remain unknown, yet several hypotheses have been advanced:

- As toxins or deterrent against predators; some compounds indirectly play this role by easing the penetration of the deterrent into the predator's integument.
- Antimicrobial and antifungal agents (especially in Hydradephaga)
- A means to increase wettability of the integument (especially in Hydradephaga)
- Alarm pheromones (especially in Gyrinidae)
- Propellant on water surfaces (especially in Gyrinidae)
- Conditioning plant tissues associated with oviposition

== Distribution and habitat ==
Habitats range from caves to rainforest canopy and alpine habitats. The body forms of some are structurally modified for adaptation to habitats: members of the family Gyrinidae live at the air-water interface, Rhysodinae live in heartwood, and Paussinae carabids inhabit ant nests.

== Feeding ==
Most species are predators. Other less-typical forms of feeding include: eating algae (family Haliplidae), seed-feeding (harpaline carabids), fungus-feeding (rhysodine carabids), and snail-feeding (licinine and cychrine carabids). Some species are ectoparasitoids of insects (brachinine and lebiine carabids) or of millipedes (peleciine carabids).

== Reproduction and larval stage ==
Some species are ovoviviparous, such as pseudomorphine carabids.

The larvae are active, with well-chitinized cuticle, often with elongated cerci and five-segmented legs, the foot-segment carrying two claws. Larvae have a fused labrum and no mandibular molae.

== Phylogeny ==
Adephagans diverged from their sister group in the Late Permian, the most recent common ancestor of living adephagans probably existing in the early Triassic, around 240 million years ago. Both aquatic and terrestrial representatives of the suborder appear in fossil records of the late Triassic. The Jurassic fauna consisted of trachypachids, carabids, gyrinids, and haliplid-like forms. The familial and tribal diversification of the group spans the Mesozoic, with a few tribes radiating explosively during the Tertiary.

The adephagans were formerly grouped into the Geadephaga with the two terrestrial families Carabidae and Trachypachidae and the Hydradephaga, for the aquatic families. However this is no longer used as the Hydradephaga are not a monophyletic group. Modern analysis has supported the clade Dytiscoidea instead, which includes many aquatic adephagans, notably excluding Gyrinidae. Rhysodidae is suggested to represent a subgroup of Carabidae rather than a distinct family, with Cicindelidae often being treated as a distinct family from Carabidae.

Cladogram of the relationships of living adephagan families after Vasilikopoulos et al. 2021 and Baca et al. 2021:

- Adephaga
  - - Gyrinoidea
      Gyrinidae
  - - - Haliploidea
        Haliplidae
      - Dytiscoidea
        - - Meruidae
          - Noteridae
        - - - Hygrobiidae
            - - Aspidytidae
              - Amphizoidae
          - Dytiscidae
    - - Caraboidea
        - Trachypachidae
        - - Cicindelidae
          - Carabidae (including former Rhysodidae)

== See also ==
- List of subgroups of the order Coleoptera
