= Callirhipis horni =

Scientific classification
- Kingdom: Animalia
- Phylum: Arthropoda
- Clade: Pancrustacea
- Class: Insecta
- Order: Coleoptera
- Suborder: Polyphaga
- Infraorder: Elateriformia
- Family: Callirhipidae
- Genus: Callirhipis
- Species: C. horni

Binomial name
- Callirhipis horni Emden, 1924

Species of beetle

Callirhipis horni is a species of beetle in the genus Callirhipis. It is found in Taiwan.

== Description ==
In males, the pronotum and elytra are brown to black in color, and the hairlike projections of the antennae are about three times the length of each antennomere.
