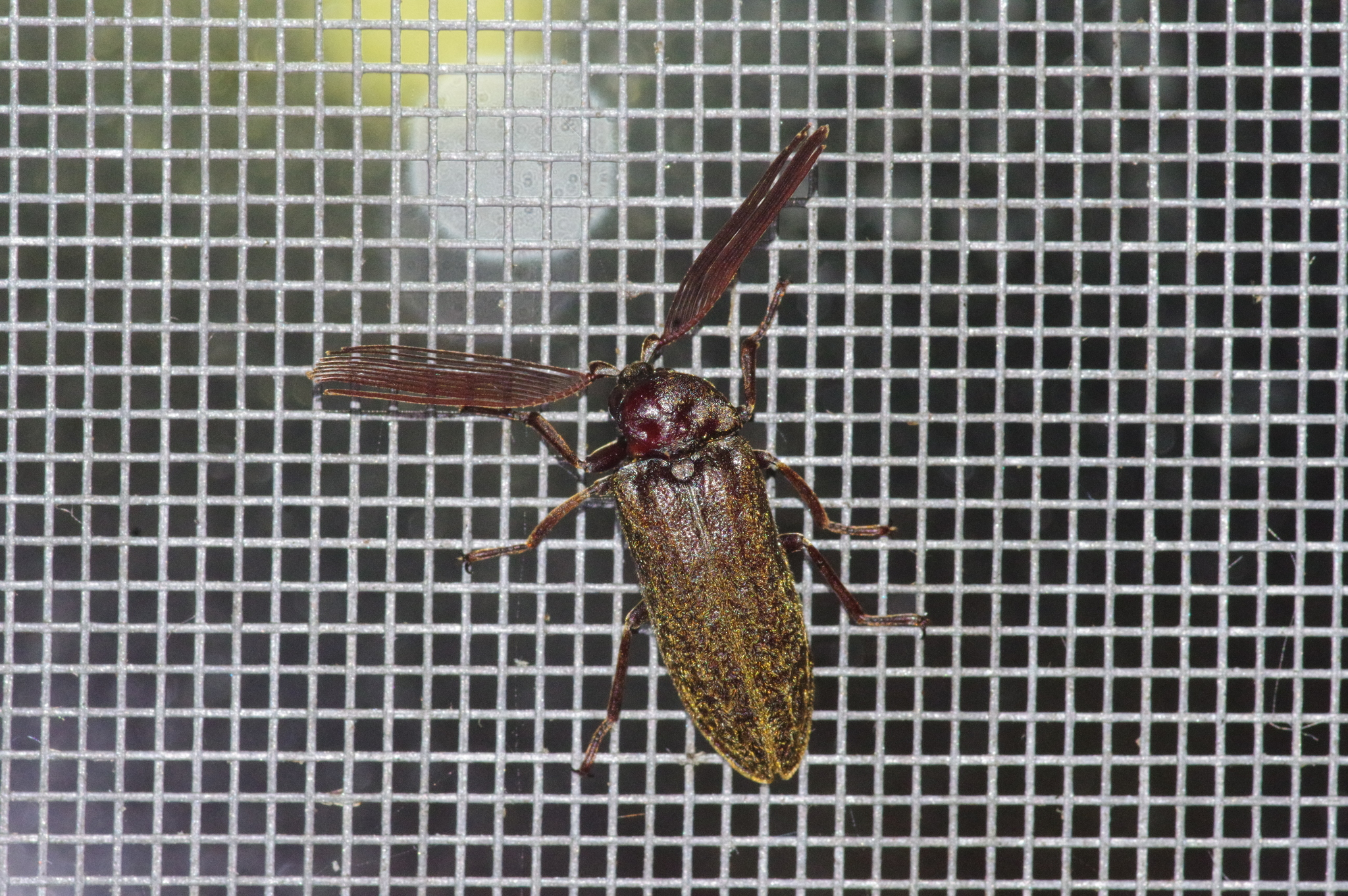

Scientific classification
- Kingdom: Animalia
- Phylum: Arthropoda
- Clade: Pancrustacea
- Class: Insecta
- Order: Coleoptera
- Suborder: Polyphaga
- Infraorder: Elateriformia
- Family: Callirhipidae
- Genus: Callirhipis
- Species: C. kurosawai

Binomial name
- Callirhipis kurosawai Sato, 1995

= Callirhipis kurosawai =

Species of beetle

Callirhipis kurosawai is a species of beetle in the genus Callirhipis. It is found in Taiwan and Japan's Ryukyu Islands.

== Description ==
In males, the body is mostly dark brown, with a small black head and reddish brown antennae, legs, and ventral surface. From the front margins of the pronotum to the elytral apices, they measure between 15.3 - 17.2 mm in length.
