= Callirhipis kojimai =

Scientific classification
- Kingdom: Animalia
- Phylum: Arthropoda
- Clade: Pancrustacea
- Class: Insecta
- Order: Coleoptera
- Suborder: Polyphaga
- Infraorder: Elateriformia
- Family: Callirhipidae
- Genus: Callirhipis
- Species: C. kojimai

Binomial name
- Callirhipis kojimai Nakane, 1996

Species of beetle

Callirhipis kojimai is a species of beetle in the genus Callirhipis. It is found in Taiwan.

== Description ==
In males, the pronotum and elytra are brown to black in color, and the hairlike projections of the antennae are about 24 times the length of each antennomere. Male beetles range from 17 to 25 mm (generally at least 20 mm) in length and have paremeres that are lineally curved inwards.
