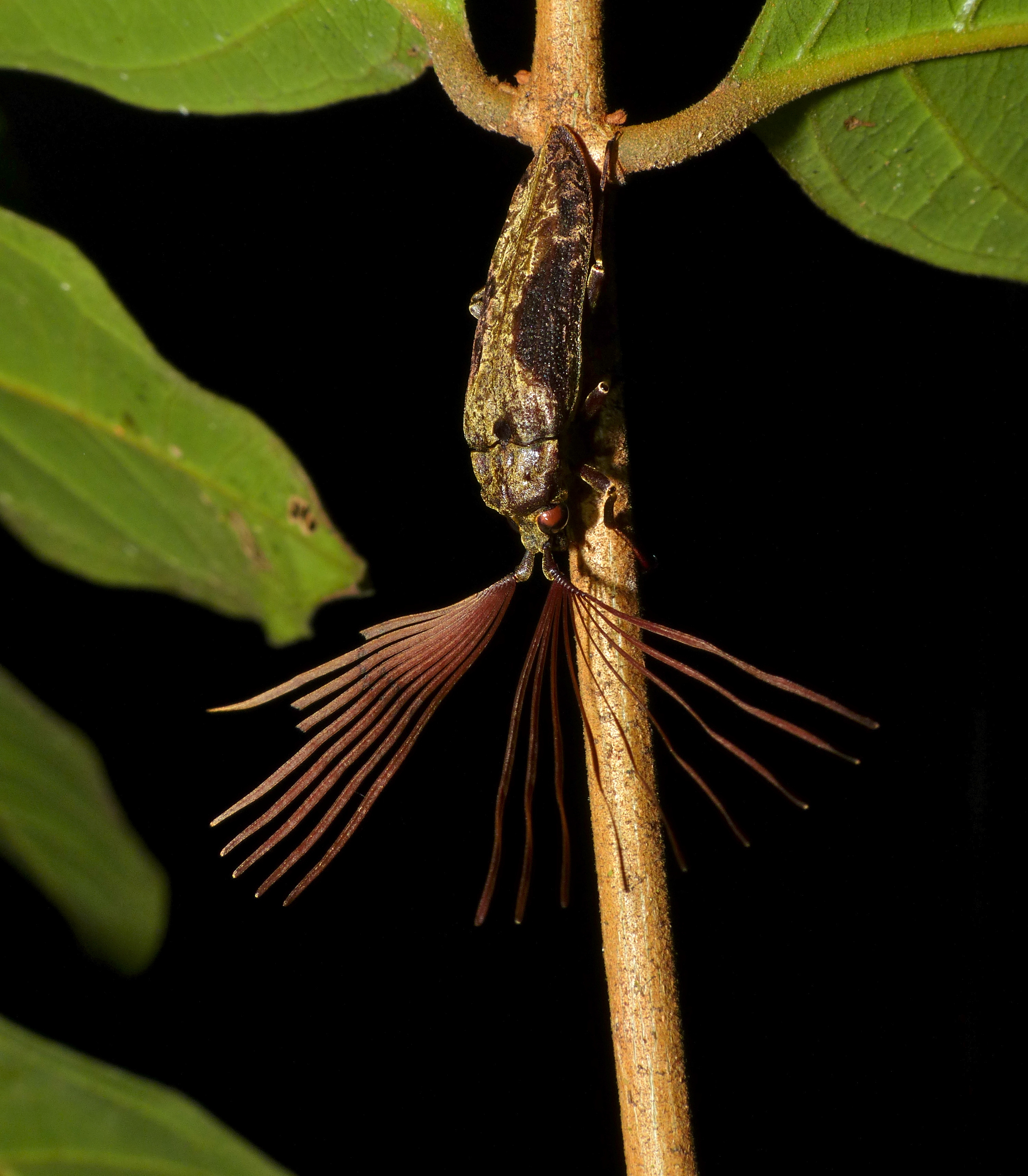

Scientific classification
- Kingdom: Animalia
- Phylum: Arthropoda
- Class: Insecta
- Order: Coleoptera
- Suborder: Polyphaga
- Infraorder: Elateriformia
- Family: Callirhipidae
- Genus: Callirhipis; Latreille in Cuvier, 1829

= Callirhipis =

Genus of beetles

Callirhipis is a genus of beetles in the family Callirhipidae. It was described by Pierre André Latreille in 1829.

== Species ==
- Callirhipis aequalis van Emden
- Callirhipis affinis (Emden, 1926)
- Callirhipis andamanensis van Emden
- Callirhipis angustior Fairmaire, 1885
- Callirhipis antennaria van Emden
- Callirhipis antiqua Waterhouse, 1877
- Callirhipis aureoscutata Pic, 1938
- Callirhipis binhana (Pic, 1927)
- Callirhipis borneensis Pic
- Callirhipis bowringi Waterhouse, 1877
- Callirhipis cardwellensis Blackburn, 1896
- Callirhipis carinifer Champion, 1896
- Callirhipis carolinensis Blair, 1940
- Callirhipis championi Westwood
- Callirhipis childreni Gray, 1832
- Callirhipis constricticollis van Emden, 1926
- Callirhipis costata Waterhouse, 1877
- Callirhipis crassissima van Emden
- Callirhipis cylindroides Fairmaire, 1877
- Callirhipis davidiana Saussure, 1888
- Callirhipis dejeani Latreille
- Callirhipis devasa Fairmaire, 1877
- Callirhipis dilaticollis Champion, 1896
- Callirhipis dissimilis Waterhouse, 1877
- Callirhipis excellens van Emden, 1926
- Callirhipis fasciata Waterhouse, 1877
- Callirhipis femorata Waterhouse, 1877
- Callirhipis formosana Pic, 1912
- Callirhipis gandmeri van Emden
- Callirhipis gausapata Waterhouse, 1877
- Callirhipis goryi Castelnau, 1834
- Callirhipis grandicornis van Emden, 1926
- Callirhipis helleri Schultze, 1915
- Callirhipis horni (Emden, 1924)
- Callirhipis impressicollis Fairmaire, 1887
- Callirhipis inconspicua Waterhouse, 1877
- Callirhipis intermedia van Emden, 1926
- Callirhipis kojimai Nakane, 1996
- Callirhipis kurosawai Sato, 1995
- Callirhipis lagunae Schultze, 1916
- Callirhipis laosensis Pic, 1917
- Callirhipis laticeps Fairmaire, 1887
- Callirhipis lineata Waterhouse, 1877
- Callirhipis longicornis Waterhouse, 1877
- Callirhipis longipunctata van Emden
- Callirhipis marmorea (Fairmaire, 1878)
- Callirhipis mexicana Champion, 1896
- Callirhipis minuta van Emden, 1926
- Callirhipis miwai Nakane, 1985
- Callirhipis montalbanensis Schultze, 1915
- Callirhipis morgani (Pic, 1928)
- Callirhipis multiimpressa (Pic, 1927)
- Callirhipis multipunctata (Pic, 1926)
- Callirhipis nigrescens van Emden
- Callirhipis obsoleta Champion, 1896
- Callirhipis orientalis Castelnau
- Callirhipis philiberti Fairmaire, 1891
- Callirhipis pici Hájek, 2011
- Callirhipis pinguis Fairmaire, 1887
- Callirhipis raui (Pic, 1929)
- Callirhipis residua Waterhouse, 1877
- Callirhipis reticulata Waterhouse, 1877
- Callirhipis reticulosa van Emden
- Callirhipis robusta Waterhouse, 1877
- Callirhipis salvazai (Pic, 1922)
- Callirhipis scutellata Fairmaire, 1887
- Callirhipis separata Gemminger, 1869
- Callirhipis simplex Waterhouse, 1877
- Callirhipis sirambea Pic
- Callirhipis stabilis Waterhouse, 1877
- Callirhipis suturalis Waterhouse, 1877
- Callirhipis therminieri Laporte de Castelnau
- Callirhipis tiaongona Schultze, 1915
- Callirhipis trepida Waterhouse, 1877
- Callirhipis unicostata Champion
- Callirhipis valida Champion, 1896
- Callirhipis variegata van Emden, 1926
- Callirhipis vestita Laporte de Castelnau, 1834
