= Celadonia =

Scientific classification
- Kingdom: Animalia
- Phylum: Arthropoda
- Class: Insecta
- Order: Coleoptera
- Suborder: Polyphaga
- Infraorder: Elateriformia
- Family: Callirhipidae
- Genus: Celadonia; Laporte de Castelnau, 1840

species
- 7 species; see text

Synonyms
- Simianides van Emden, 1924

Genus of beetles

Celadonia is a genus of beetles in the family Callirhipidae. It was described by Laporte de Castelnau in 1840.

== Species ==
- Celadonia bicolor (Laporte de Castelnau, 1834)
- Celadonia bocourti Pic, 1927
- Celadonia gounelleii (Pic, 1916)
- Celadonia hoodii (Saunders, 1834) (type species)
- Celadonia laportei Hope
- Celadonia luteonotata (Pic, 1907)
- Celadonia scapularis (Laporte de Castelnau, 1834)
