= Ptorthocera =

Scientific classification
- Kingdom: Animalia
- Phylum: Arthropoda
- Class: Insecta
- Order: Coleoptera
- Suborder: Polyphaga
- Infraorder: Elateriformia
- Family: Callirhipidae
- Genus: Ptorthocera; Champion, 1896
- Species: P. calva

Binomial name
- Ptorthocera calva Champion, 1896

Genus of beetles

Ptorthocera calva is a species of beetles in the family Callirhipidae, and the only species in the genus Ptorthocera. It was described by Champion in 1896, and is known from Guatemala.
