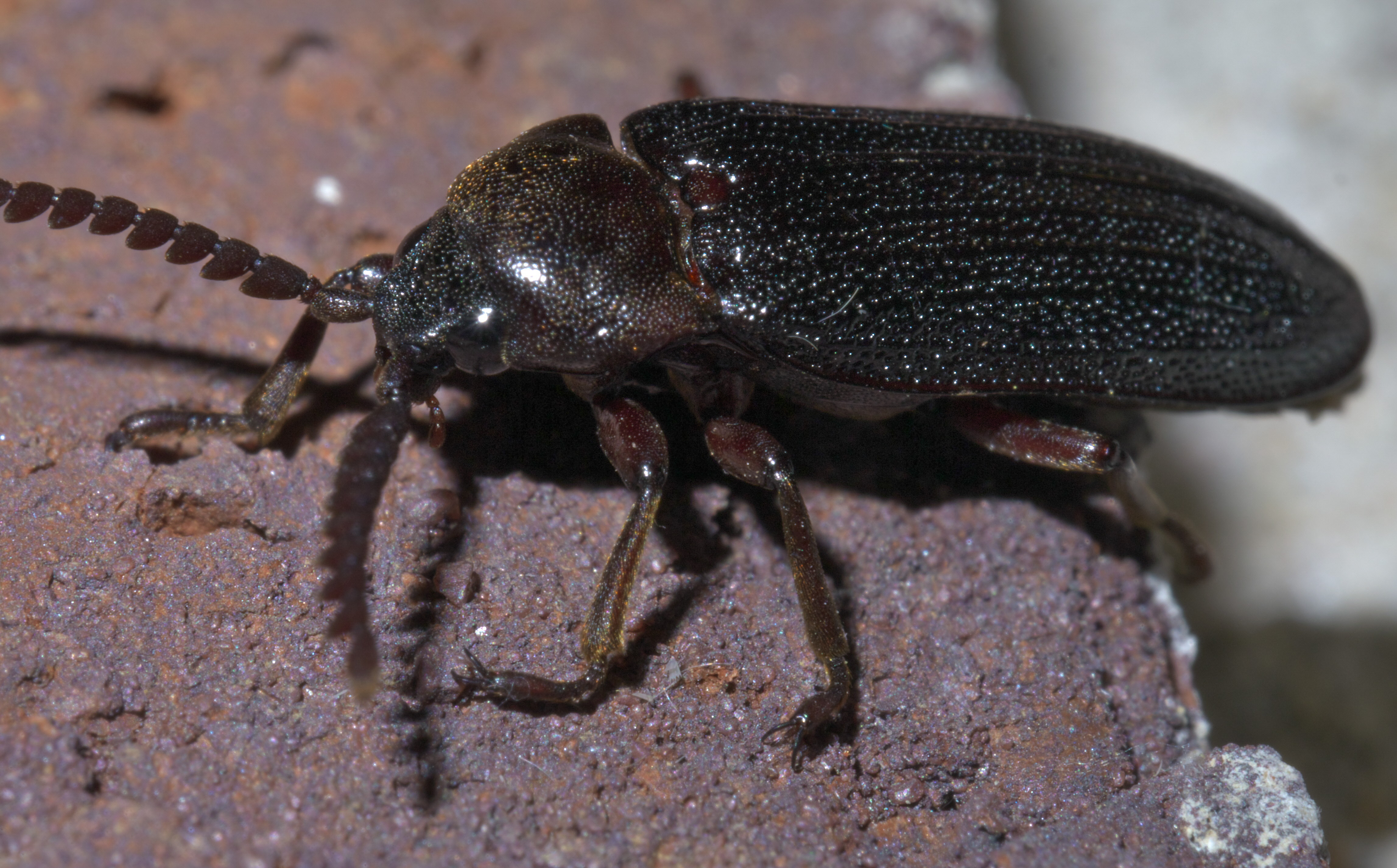

Scientific classification
- Kingdom: Animalia
- Phylum: Arthropoda
- Class: Insecta
- Order: Coleoptera
- Suborder: Polyphaga
- Infraorder: Elateriformia
- Family: Callirhipidae
- Genus: Zenoa; Say, 1835
- Species: Z. picea

Binomial name
- Zenoa picea (Palisot de Beauvois, 1805)

Synonyms
- Melasis picea Palisot de Beauvois, 1805; Zenoa brunnea Say, 1835; Zenoa vulnerata LeConte, 1847

= Zenoa =

Genus of beetles

Zenoa is a genus of beetles in the family Callirhipidae, containing a single described species, Zenoa picea. The species was described by Palisot de Beauvois in 1805.
