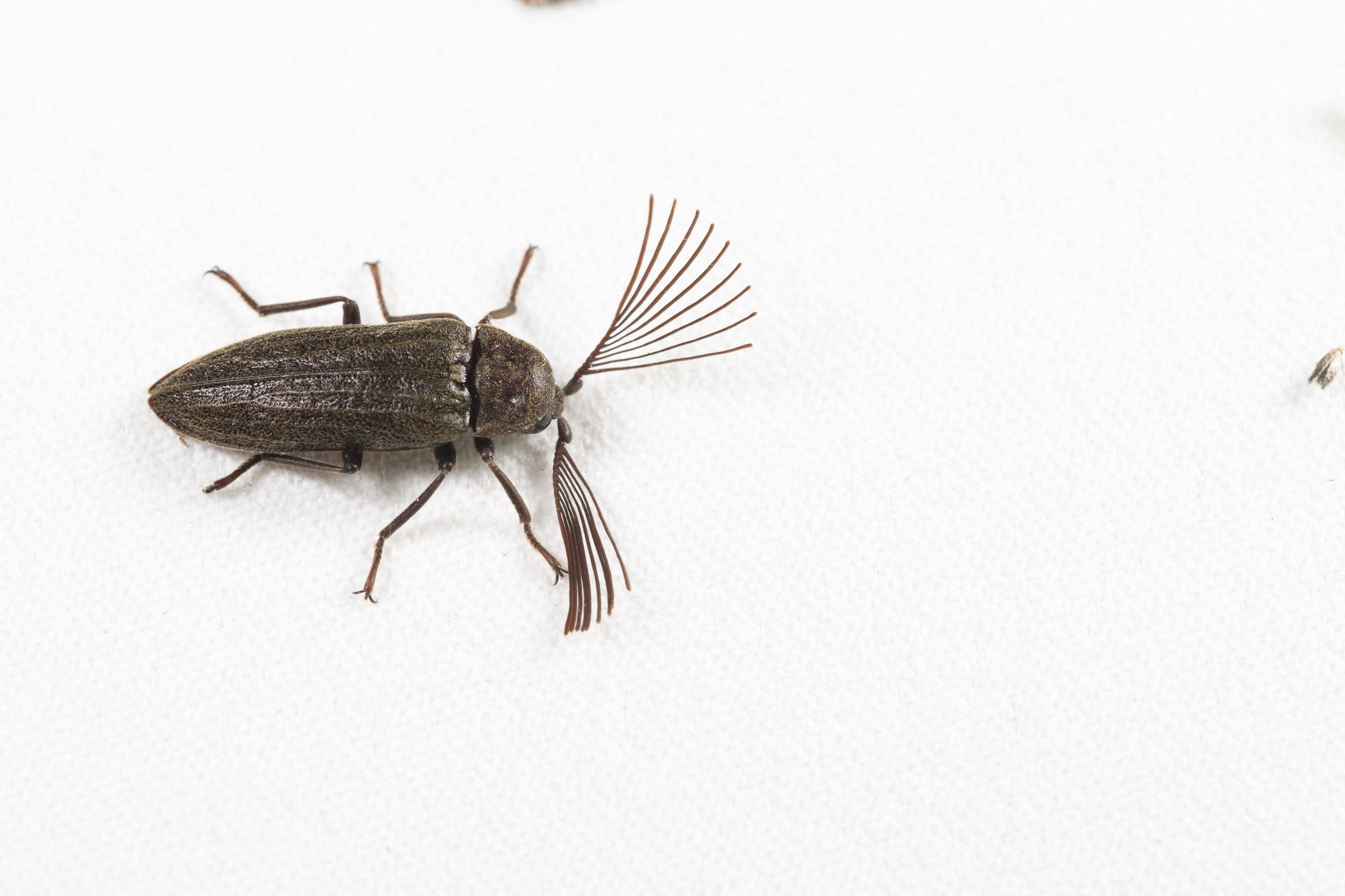

Scientific classification
- Kingdom: Animalia
- Phylum: Arthropoda
- Clade: Pancrustacea
- Class: Insecta
- Order: Coleoptera
- Suborder: Polyphaga
- Infraorder: Elateriformia
- Family: Callirhipidae
- Genus: Callirhipis
- Species: C. formosana

Binomial name
- Callirhipis formosana Pic, 1912

= Callirhipis formosana =

Species of beetle

Callirhipis formosana is a species of beetle in the genus Callirhipis. It is found in Taiwan.

== Description ==
In males, the pronotum and elytra are brown to black in color, and the hairlike projections of the antennae are about 24 times the length of each antennomere. Male beetles range from 15 to 18 mm in length and have wavy paremeres. The antennae of female are somewhat shorter, with the hairlike projections similar in length to its respective antennomere.
