= Ennometes =

Scientific classification
- Kingdom: Animalia
- Phylum: Arthropoda
- Class: Insecta
- Order: Coleoptera
- Suborder: Polyphaga
- Infraorder: Elateriformia
- Family: Callirhipidae
- Genus: Ennometes; Pascoe, 1866

Genus of beetles

Ennometes is a genus of beetles in the family Callirhipidae. It was described by Pascoe in 1866.

== Species ==
Sources:

- Ennometes brevitarsis van Emden
- Ennometes cerrutii (Pic, 1927)
- Ennometes cribratus (Waterhouse, 1877)
- Ennometes impressiceps Pic, 1922
- Ennometes incertus (Emden, 1936)
- Ennometes longiramus van Emden, 1926
- Ennometes onoi (Blair, 1940)
- Ennometes ruficeps Pic, 1926
- Ennometes rufiornis (Gray) (type species)
- Ennometes tarsalis (Emden, 1932)
- Ennometes testaceicornis Pic
