= Brachyrrhipis =

Scientific classification
- Kingdom: Animalia
- Phylum: Arthropoda
- Class: Insecta
- Order: Coleoptera
- Suborder: Polyphaga
- Infraorder: Elateriformia
- Family: Callirhipidae
- Genus: Brachyrrhipis van Emden, 1931

Genus of beetles

Brachyrrhipis is a genus of beetles in the family Callirhipidae. It was described by van Emden in 1931.

== Species ==
- Brachyrrhipis tenuipes (Champion, 1896)
- Brachyrrhipis venosa (Champion, 1896)
