= Simianus =

Scientific classification
- Kingdom: Animalia
- Phylum: Arthropoda
- Class: Insecta
- Order: Coleoptera
- Suborder: Polyphaga
- Infraorder: Elateriformia
- Family: Callirhipidae
- Genus: Simianus; Blanchard, 1853

species
- ~35; see text

Synonyms
- Homoeorhipis Fairmaire, 1887; Horatocera Lewis, 1895; Simianellus van Emden, 1924

Genus of beetles

Simianus is a genus of beetles in the family Callirhipidae. It was described by Blanchard in 1853.

== Species ==
- Simianus angustatus Pic, 1929
- Simianus apicalis Pic, 1923
  - Simianus apicalis apicalis Pic, 1923
  - Simianus apicalis lateapicalis Pic, 1928
- Simianus atrimembris Pic, 1950
- Simianus basalis (van Emden, 1924)
- Simianus bicolor (Fairmaire, 1893)
- Simianus bicoloripes Pic, 1922
- Simianus bituberculatus (Schultze, 1915)
  - Simianus bituberculatus bituberculatus (Schultze, 1915)
  - Simianus bituberculatus dilatatus (van Emden, 1932)
- Simianus confusus (van Emden, 1932)
- Simianus croceosellatus (Fairmaire, 1887)
- Simianus cyaneicollis (Waterhouse, 1877)
- Simianus discoidalis Pic, 1923
- Simianus diversicornis Pic, 1925
- Simianus globicollis (van Emden, 1924)
- Simianus inapicalis Pic, 1925
- Simianus incisus (van Emden, 1924)
- Simianus javanus Pic, 1929
- Simianus laetus (Waterhouse, 1877)
- Simianus latepunctatus (Pic, 1943)
- Simianus maculaticeps (Pic, 1921)
  - Simianus maculaticeps bilineatus Pic, 1938
  - Simianus maculaticeps maculaticeps (Pic, 1921)
- Simianus malaccanus (Pic, 1916)
- Simianus melanocephalus (van Emden, 1924)
- Simianus mesomelaenus (Fairmaire, 1887)
- Simianus nigripennis (van Emden, 1932)
- Simianus nigriventralis (Schultze, 1915)
- Simianus niponicus (Lewis, 1895)
- Simianus obscurus (van Emden, 1924)
  - Simianus obscurus obscurus (van Emden, 1924)
  - Simianus obscurus sikkimensis (van Emden, 1932)
- Simianus oshimanus (Nakane, 1973)
- Simianus palawanicus (van Emden, 1932)
- Simianus pascoei (Waterhouse, 1895)
- Simianus pasteuri Pic, 1928
- Simianus reductus Pic, 1925
- Simianus ruber (Pic, 1929)
- Simianus rubricollis (Pic, 1916)
- Simianus separatus (Gemminger, 1869)
- Simianus terminatus Fairmaire, 1887
- Simianus thoracicus (van Emden, 1924)
- Simianus ustus (Fairmaire, 1887)
