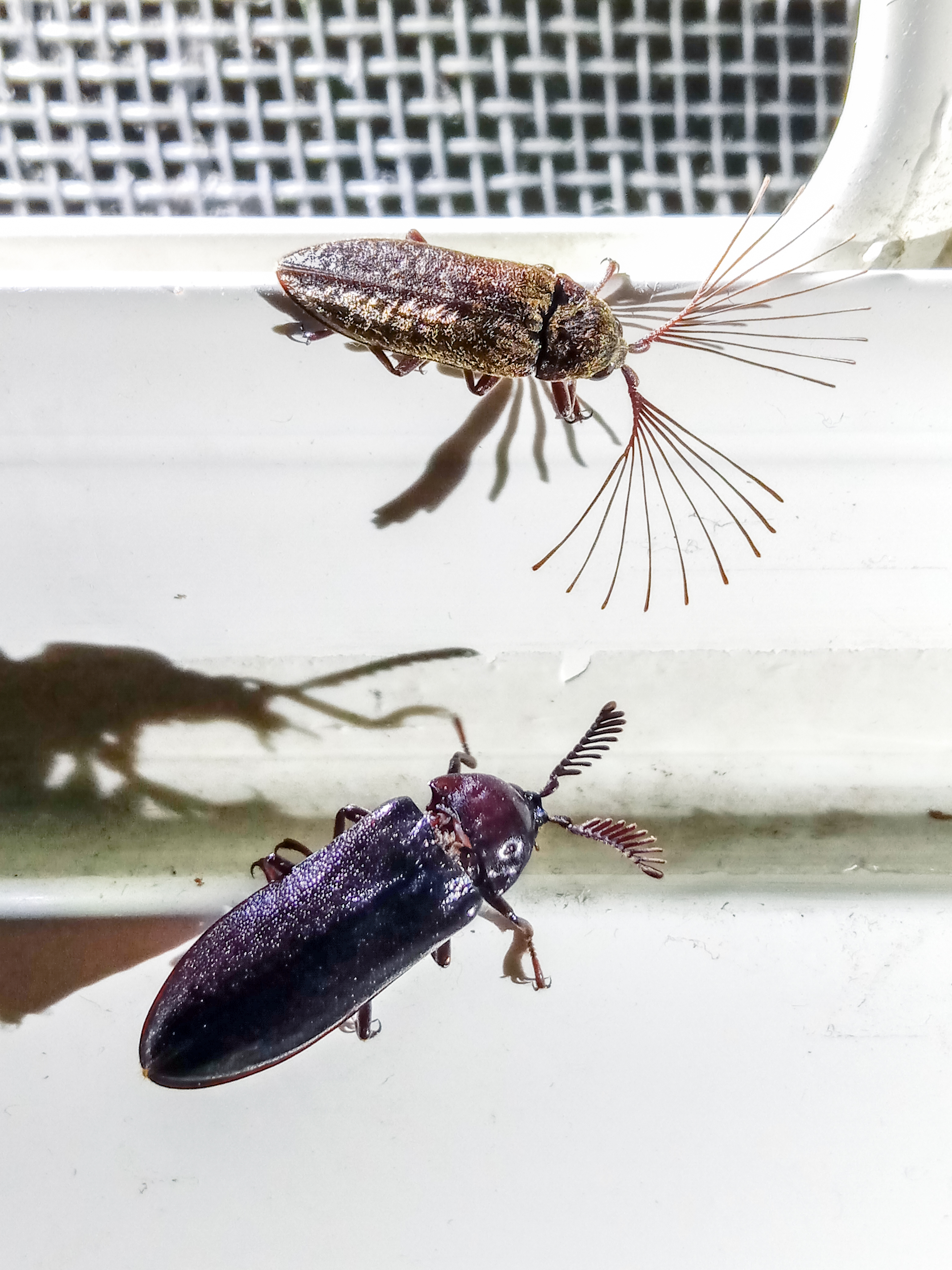
- Male (above) and female (below) Callirhipis formosana

Scientific classification
- Kingdom: Animalia
- Phylum: Arthropoda
- Clade: Pancrustacea
- Class: Insecta
- Order: Coleoptera
- Suborder: Polyphaga
- Infraorder: Elateriformia
- Superfamily: Byrrhoidea
- Family: Callirhipidae; Emden, 1924

= Callirhipidae =

Family of beetles

Callirhipidae (also known sometimes as Callirhipid Beetles or Callirhipidae Cedar Beetles) is a family of beetles, found widely throughout low-latitude regions except tropical Africa and Madagascar. There are around 175 species and sub-species in 7 genus and subgenus. The larvae bore into dead wood and generally have a life span of 2 or more years. The adults are generally nocturnal.

== Genera ==
There are currently seven recognised genera in Callirhipidae.

- Brachyrrhipis van Emden, 1931
- Callirhipis Latreille, 1829
  - subgenus Ennometidium Emden, 1929
  - subgenus Helleriola Emden, 1934
  - subgenus Parennometes Emden, 1931
- Celadonia Laporte de Castelnau, 1840
- Ennometes Pascoe, 1866
- Ptorthocera Champion, 1896
- Simianus Blanchard, 1853
- Zenoa Say, 1835
