= Glyptoscelimorpha juniperae =

Scientific classification
- Domain: Eukaryota
- Kingdom: Animalia
- Phylum: Arthropoda
- Class: Insecta
- Order: Coleoptera
- Suborder: Polyphaga
- Infraorder: Elateriformia
- Family: Schizopodidae
- Genus: Glyptoscelimorpha
- Species: G. juniperae

Binomial name
- Glyptoscelimorpha juniperae (Knull, 1940)

Species of beetle

Glyptoscelimorpha juniperae is a species of false jewel beetle in the family Schizopodidae. It is found in North America.

== Subspecies ==
These two subspecies belong to the species Glyptoscelimorpha juniperae:

- Glyptoscelimorpha juniperae juniperae (Knull, 1940)
- Glyptoscelimorpha juniperae viridiceps Nelson in Nelson & Bellamy, 1991
