= Dystaxia elegans =

Scientific classification
- Domain: Eukaryota
- Kingdom: Animalia
- Phylum: Arthropoda
- Class: Insecta
- Order: Coleoptera
- Suborder: Polyphaga
- Infraorder: Elateriformia
- Family: Schizopodidae
- Genus: Dystaxia
- Species: D. elegans

Binomial name
- Dystaxia elegans Fall, 1905

Species of beetle

Dystaxia elegans is a species of false jewel beetle in the family Schizopodidae. It is found in North America.
