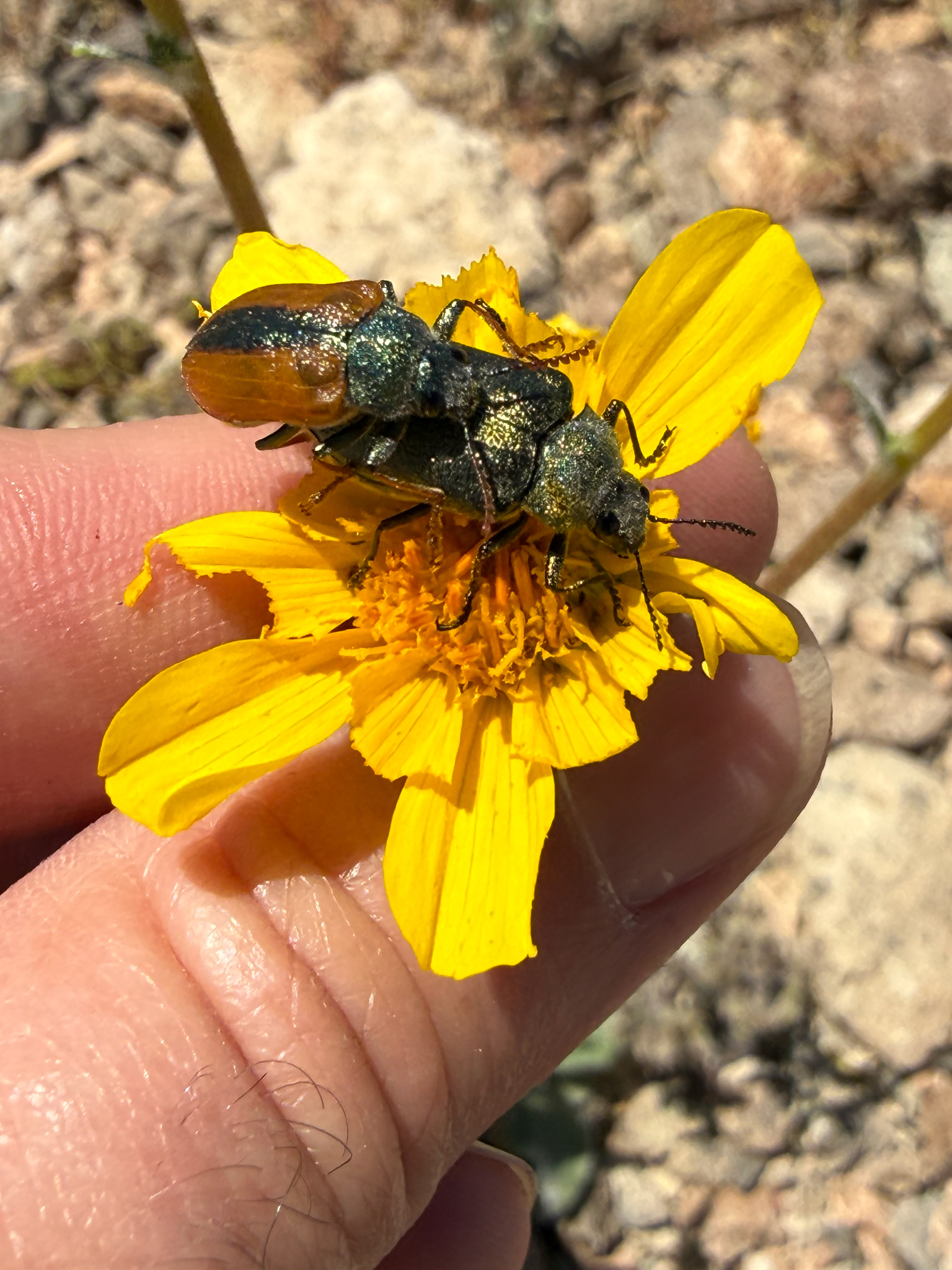

Scientific classification
- Kingdom: Animalia
- Phylum: Arthropoda
- Clade: Pancrustacea
- Class: Insecta
- Order: Coleoptera
- Suborder: Polyphaga
- Infraorder: Elateriformia
- Family: Schizopodidae
- Genus: Schizopus
- Species: S. laetus

Binomial name
- Schizopus laetus LeConte, 1858

= Schizopus laetus =

Species of beetle

Schizopus laetus is a species of false jewel beetle in the family Schizopodidae. It is found in North America.
