= Dystaxia =

Dystaxia may refer to:

- A mild form of ataxia, a neurological sign consisting of lack of voluntary coordination of muscle movements
- Dystaxia (genus), a beetle genus
