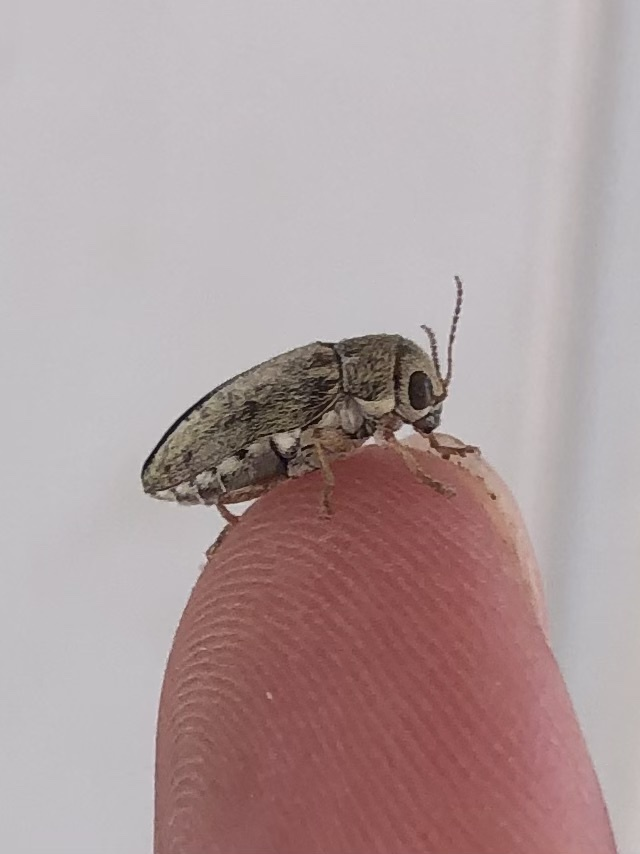

Scientific classification
- Kingdom: Animalia
- Phylum: Arthropoda
- Clade: Pancrustacea
- Class: Insecta
- Order: Coleoptera
- Suborder: Polyphaga
- Infraorder: Elateriformia
- Family: Schizopodidae
- Genus: Glyptoscelimorpha
- Species: G. marmorata

Binomial name
- Glyptoscelimorpha marmorata Horn, 1893

= Glyptoscelimorpha marmorata =

Species of beetle

Glyptoscelimorpha marmorata is a species of false jewel beetle in the family Schizopodidae. It is found in North America.
