= Dystaxia murrayi =

Scientific classification
- Kingdom: Animalia
- Phylum: Arthropoda
- Clade: Pancrustacea
- Class: Insecta
- Order: Coleoptera
- Suborder: Polyphaga
- Infraorder: Elateriformia
- Family: Schizopodidae
- Genus: Dystaxia
- Species: D. murrayi

Binomial name
- Dystaxia murrayi LeConte, 1866

Synonyms
- Dystaxia cuprea Knull, 1947; Dystaxia lecontei Thomson, 1879

Species of beetle

Dystaxia murrayi is a species of false jewel beetle in the family Schizopodidae. It is found in North America, California.
