= Glyptoscelimorpha viridis =

Scientific classification
- Domain: Eukaryota
- Kingdom: Animalia
- Phylum: Arthropoda
- Class: Insecta
- Order: Coleoptera
- Suborder: Polyphaga
- Infraorder: Elateriformia
- Family: Schizopodidae
- Genus: Glyptoscelimorpha
- Species: G. viridis

Binomial name
- Glyptoscelimorpha viridis Chamberlin, 1931

Species of beetle

Glyptoscelimorpha viridis is a species of false jewel beetle in the family Schizopodidae. It is found in North America.
