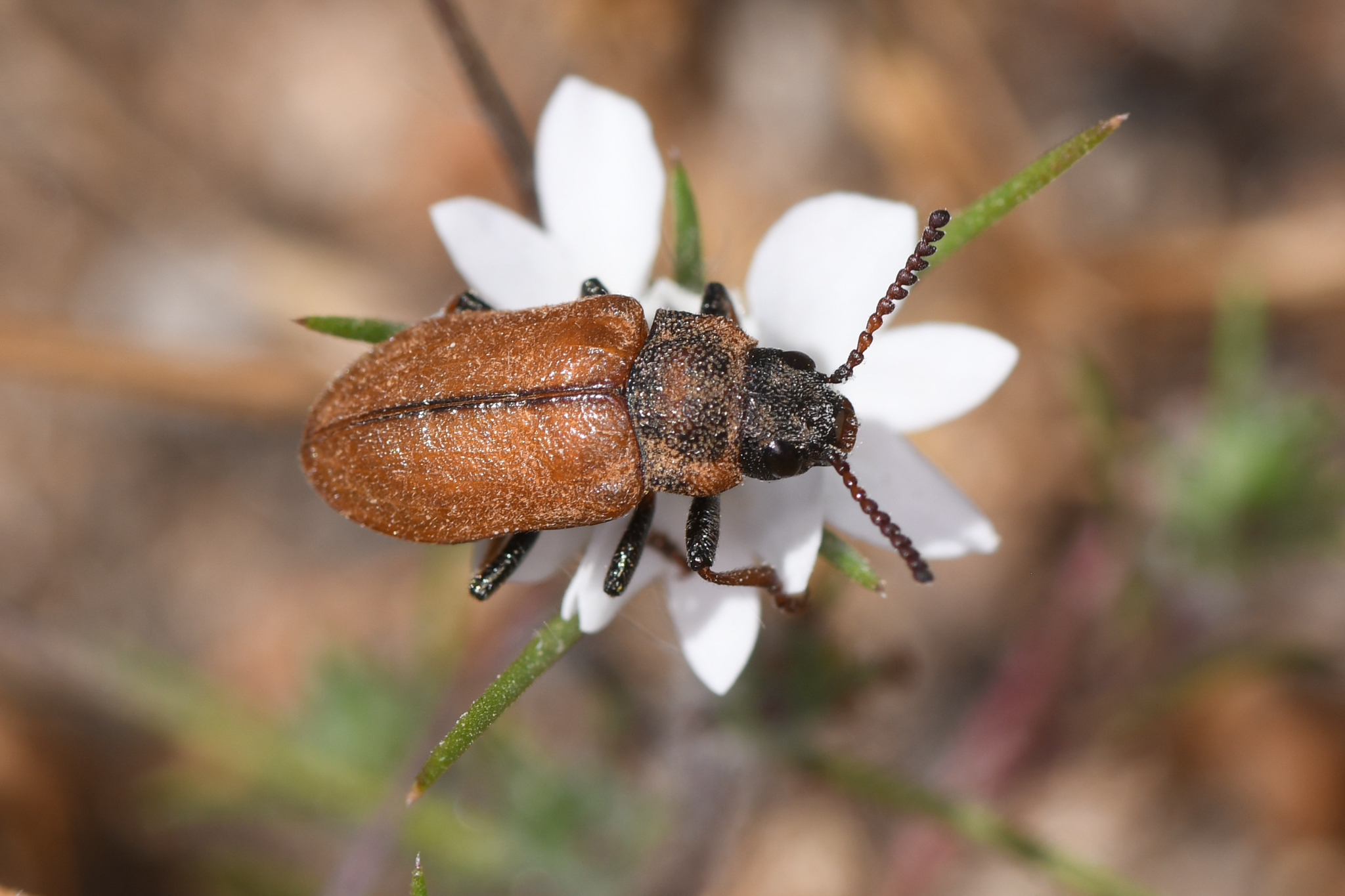
- Schizopus sallei nigricans

Scientific classification
- Kingdom: Animalia
- Phylum: Arthropoda
- Clade: Pancrustacea
- Class: Insecta
- Order: Coleoptera
- Suborder: Polyphaga
- Infraorder: Elateriformia
- Family: Schizopodidae
- Genus: Schizopus
- Species: S. sallei

Binomial name
- Schizopus sallei Horn, 1885

= Schizopus sallei =

Species of beetle

Schizopus sallei is a species of false jewel beetle in the family Schizopodidae. It is found in North America.

== Subspecies ==
These two subspecies belong to the species Schizopus sallei:

- Schizopus sallei nigricans Nelson in Nelson & Bellamy, 1991
- Schizopus sallei sallei Horn, 1885
