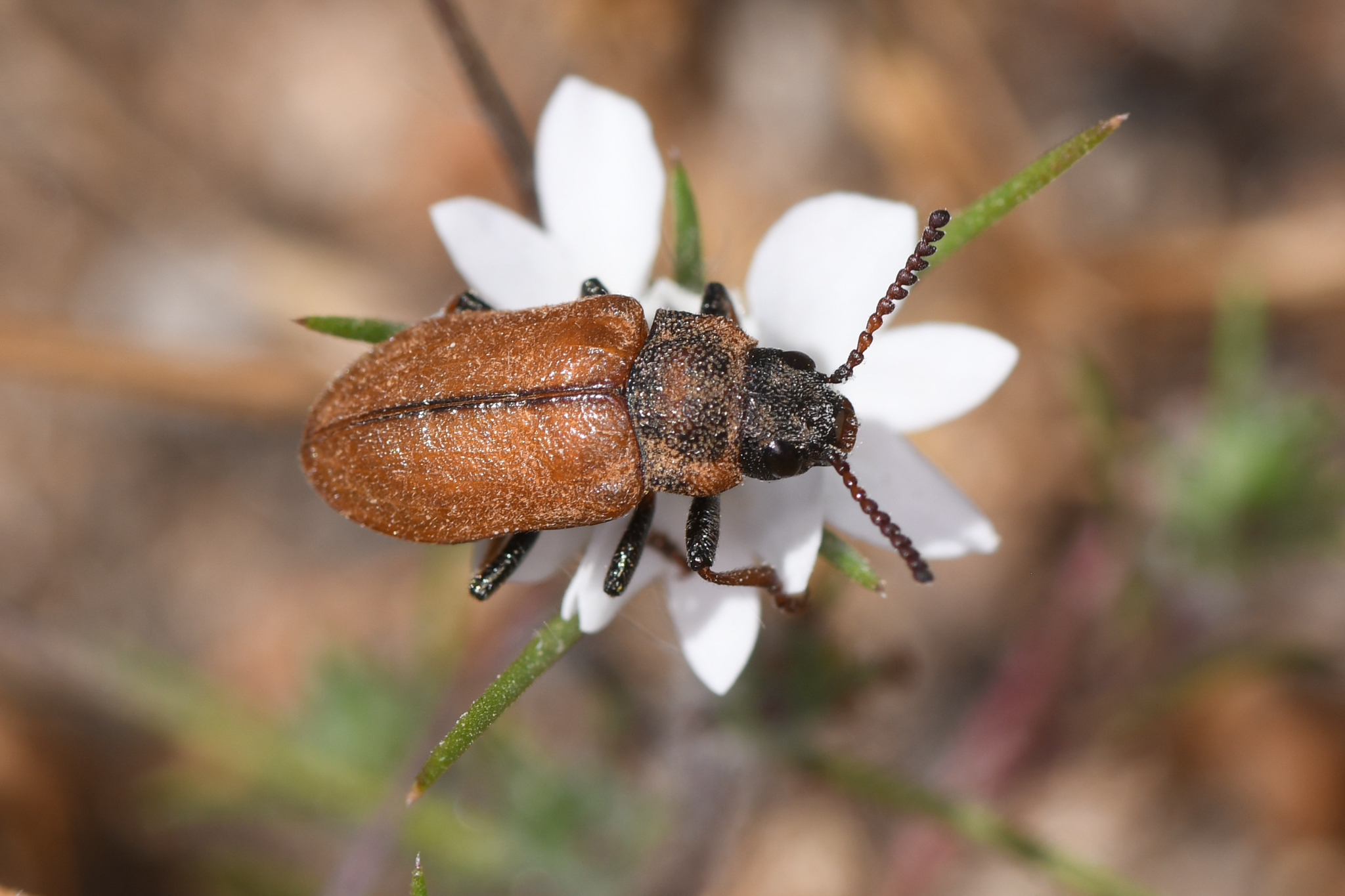
- Schizopus sallei

Scientific classification
- Kingdom: Animalia
- Phylum: Arthropoda
- Clade: Pancrustacea
- Class: Insecta
- Order: Coleoptera
- Suborder: Polyphaga
- Infraorder: Elateriformia
- Family: Schizopodidae
- Genus: Schizopus; LeConte, 1858

Synonyms
- Yermoella Obenberger, 1939

= Schizopus =

Genus of beetles

Schizopus is a genus of beetles in the family Schizopodidae, containing the following species:

- Schizopus laetus LeConte, 1858
- Schizopus sallei Horn, 1885
