= Electrapate =

Scientific classification
- Domain: Eukaryota
- Kingdom: Animalia
- Phylum: Arthropoda
- Class: Insecta
- Order: Coleoptera
- Suborder: Polyphaga
- Infraorder: Elateriformia
- Family: Schizopodidae
- Genus: †Electrapate
- Species: †E. martynovi

Binomial name
- †Electrapate martynovi Iablokoff-Khnzorian, 1962

Genus of beetles

Electrapate martynovi is an extinct species of beetles in the family Schizopodidae, the only species in the genus Electrapate.
