= Glyptoscelimorpha =

Scientific classification
- Domain: Eukaryota
- Kingdom: Animalia
- Phylum: Arthropoda
- Class: Insecta
- Order: Coleoptera
- Suborder: Polyphaga
- Infraorder: Elateriformia
- Family: Schizopodidae
- Genus: Glyptoscelimorpha; Horn, 1893

Genus of beetles

Glyptoscelimorpha is a genus of beetles in the family Schizopodidae, containing the following species:

- Glyptoscelimorpha juniperae (Knull, 1940)
- Glyptoscelimorpha marmorata Horn, 1893
- Glyptoscelimorpha viridis Chamberlin, 1931
