= Dystaxia (beetle) =

Scientific classification
- Domain: Eukaryota
- Kingdom: Animalia
- Phylum: Arthropoda
- Class: Insecta
- Order: Coleoptera
- Suborder: Polyphaga
- Infraorder: Elateriformia
- Family: Schizopodidae
- Genus: Dystaxia; LeConte, 1866

Genus of beetles

Dystaxia is a genus of beetles in the family Schizopodidae, containing the following species:

- Dystaxia elegans Fall, 1905
- Dystaxia murrayi LeConte, 1866
