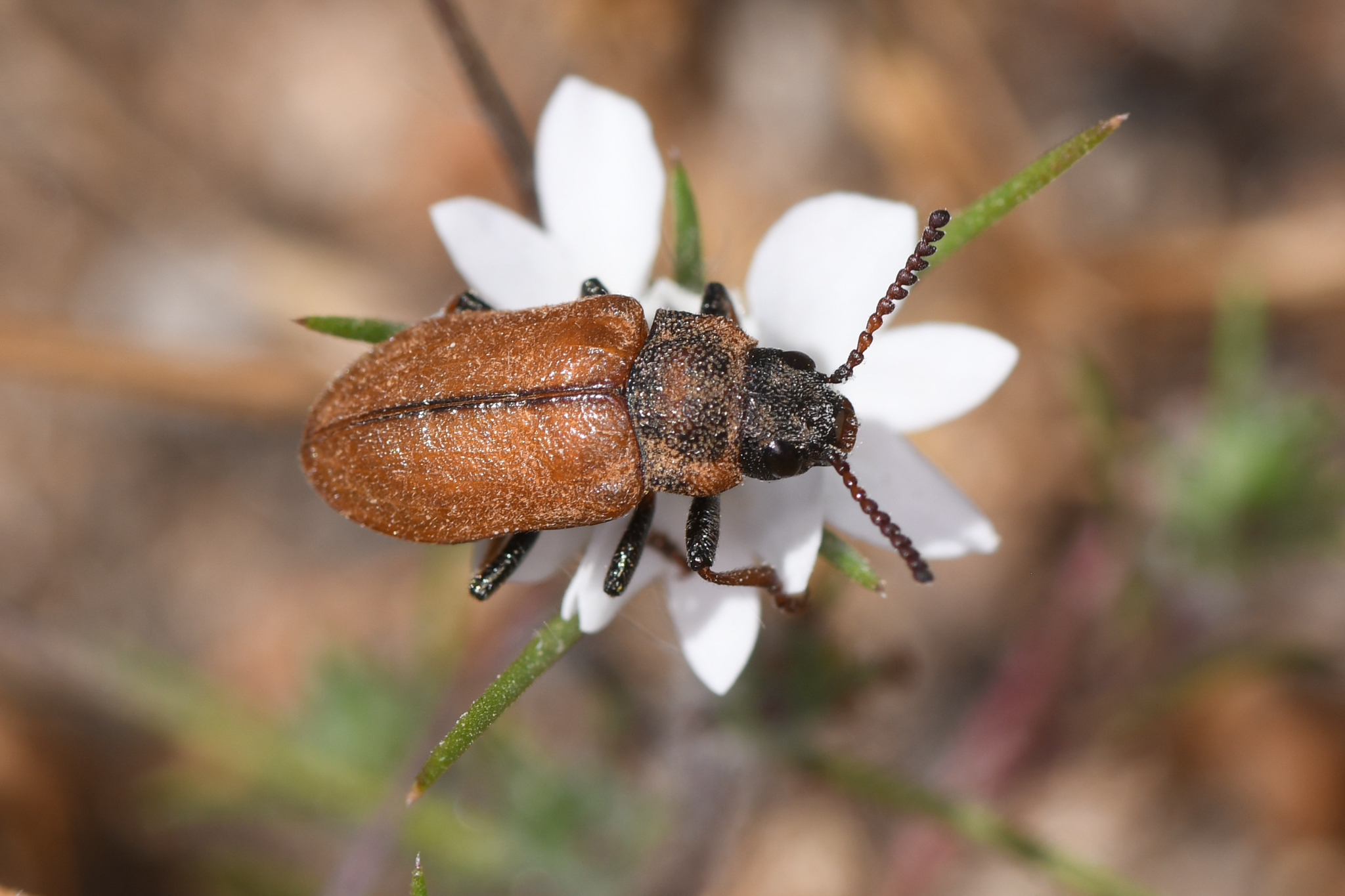
- Schizopus sallei

Scientific classification
- Kingdom: Animalia
- Phylum: Arthropoda
- Clade: Pancrustacea
- Class: Insecta
- Order: Coleoptera
- Suborder: Polyphaga
- Infraorder: Elateriformia
- Superfamily: Buprestoidea
- Family: Schizopodidae; LeConte, 1859

= Schizopodidae =

Schizopodidae Temporal range: Aptian–Recent

Family of beetles

Schizopodidae is a family of beetles, in the large suborder Polyphaga. It was a subfamily until 1991, when it was elevated to family status.

The family of Schizopodidae is a part of the superfamily, Buprestoidea, which is a member of the suborder of polyphaga beetles, defined by the coxa not being fused to the thorax. Buprestoidea contains bullet-shaped beetles, known for their distinctive metallic colors. Little is known about Schizopodidae, but the adults are often found clinging to plants.

The family contains the following genera:

- Dystaxia LeConte, 1866
- †Electrapate Iablokoff-Khnzorian, 1962 Baltic amber, Eocene
- Glyptoscelimorpha Horn, 1893
- †Mesoschizopus Cai et al., 2015 Yixian Formation, China, Early Cretaceous (Aptian)
- Schizopus LeConte, 1858
