= List of Anthribidae genera =

This is a list of 450 genera in the family Anthribidae, fungus weevils.

== Anthribidae genera ==
- Acanthopygus ^{c g}
- Acanthothorax ^{c g}
- Acarodes ^{c g}
- Acaromimus Jordan, 1907^{i c g b}
- Achoragus ^{c g}
- Acorynus ^{c g}
- Adapterops Frieser, 2010^{g}
- Adoxastia ^{c g}
- Aethessa ^{c g}
- Afrocedus ^{c g}
- Afrophaenotherium ^{c g}
- Allandrus LeConte, 1876^{i c g b}
- Allochoragus ^{c g}
- Allochromicis ^{c g}
- Alloderes ^{c g}
- Alloplius ^{c g}
- Alloschema
- Alticopus ^{c g}
- Altipectus ^{c g}
- Ambonoderes
- Amecus
- Anacerastes ^{c g}
- Analotes ^{c g}
- Anaulodes ^{c g}
- Ancylotropis ^{c g}
- Androceras ^{c g}
- Androporus Holloway, 1982^{g}
- Aneurhinus ^{c g}
- Anhelita ^{c g}
- Anthiera ^{c g}
- Anthrenosoma ^{c g}
- Anthribidus ^{c g}
- Anthribisomus ^{c g}
- Anthribites ^{c g}
- Anthribulus ^{c g}
- Anthribus Geoffroy, 1762^{i c g b}
- Anthrimecus ^{c g}
- Antioxenus ^{c g}
- Antribisomus ^{c g}
- Apatenia ^{c g}
- Aphaulimia ^{c g}
- Apinotropis ^{c g}
- Apolecta ^{c g}
- Apolectella ^{c g}
- Apteroxenus ^{c g}
- Arachnocaulus ^{c g}
- Araecerus Schoenherr, 1823^{i c g b}
- Araeocerodes ^{c g}
- Araeocerus ^{c g}
- Araeocorynus ^{c g}
- Araeoderes Schaeffer, 1906^{i c g b}
- Aranthribus Kuschel, 1998^{g}
- Arecopais ^{c g}
- Asemorhinus ^{c g}
- Astianus ^{c g}
- Atinella ^{c g}
- Atinellia ^{c g}
- Atophoderes ^{c g}
- Atoporhis ^{c g}
- Atropideres ^{c g}
- Aulodina ^{c g}
- Aurigeripilus Mermudes^{g}
- Autotropis ^{c g}
- Balanodes ^{c g}
- Barra ^{c g}
- Barridia ^{c g}
- Basarukinia ^{c g}
- Baseocolpus ^{c g}
- Basidissus ^{c g}
- Basitropis ^{c g}
- Batyrhinius ^{c g}
- Blaberops ^{c g}
- Blabirhinus ^{c}
- Bothrus ^{c g}
- Botriessa ^{c g}
- Brachetrus ^{c g}
- Brachycorynus Valentine, 1998^{i g b}
- Brachylaenus ^{c g}
- Brachytarsoides ^{c g}
- Brachytarsus ^{c g}
- Branconymus ^{c g}
- Brevibarra ^{c g}
- Breviurodon ^{c g}
- Bruchela ^{c g}
- Bruchella ^{c g}
- Bythoprotus ^{c g}
- Caccorhinus ^{c g}
- Cacephatus ^{c g}
- Caenophloeobius ^{c g}
- Caliobius Holloway, 1982^{g}
- Callanthribus ^{c g}
- Camaroderes ^{c g}
- Cappadox ^{c g}
- Caranistes ^{c g}
- Catephina ^{c g}
- Cedocus ^{c g}
- Cedus ^{c g}
- Cenchromorphus ^{c g}
- Cerambyrhynchus ^{c g}
- Cercomorphus ^{c g}
- Cercotaphius ^{c g}
- Cerius Holloway, 1982^{g}
- Chirotenon ^{c g}
- Choragus Kirby, 1819^{i c g b}
- Cisanthribus ^{c g}
- Citacalus ^{c g}
- Cleorisintor ^{c g}
- Cleranthribus ^{c g}
- Commista ^{c g}
- Conauchenus ^{c g}
- Contexta ^{c g}
- Cornipila ^{c g}
- Corrhecerus ^{c g}
- Corynaecia ^{c g}
- Cratoparis ^{c g}
- Cretanthribus Legalov, 2009^{g}
- Cretochoragus Soriano, Gratshev & Delclòs, 2006^{g}
- Cybosoma ^{c g}
- Cylindroides ^{c g}
- Cyptoxenus Valentine, 1982^{g}
- Dasyanthribus Holloway, 1982^{g}
- Dasycorynus ^{c g}
- Dasyrhopala ^{c g}
- Decataphanes ^{c g}
- Dendropemon ^{c g}
- Dendrotrogus ^{c g}
- Derisemias ^{c g}
- Derographium ^{c g}
- Deropygus ^{c g}
- Deuterocrates ^{c g}
- Diastatotropis Lacordaire, 1866^{g}
- Dinema Fairmaire, 1849^{i c g}
- Dinephrius ^{c g}
- Dinocentrus ^{c g}
- Dinomelaena ^{c g}
- Dinosaphis ^{c g}
- Directarius ^{c g}
- Discotenes Labram & Imhoff, 1839^{i c g b}
- Disphaerona ^{c g}
- Disphaeronella ^{c g}
- Dissoleucas ^{c g}
- Doeothena ^{c g}
- Dolichocera ^{c g}
- Domoptolis ^{c g}
- Doticus ^{c g}
- Dysnocryptus ^{c g}
- Dysnos ^{c g}
- Ecelonerus ^{c g}
- Echotropis ^{c g}
- Ecprepia ^{c g}
- Ectatotarsus ^{c g}
- Eczesaris
- Electranthribus Legalov, 2013^{g}
- Enedreutes ^{c g}
- Enedreytes ^{c g}
- Ennadius
- Enspondus ^{c g}
- Entaphioides ^{c g}
- Entromus ^{c g}
- Eothaumas ^{c g}
- Epargemus ^{c g}
- Epicerastes ^{c g}
- Epidysnos ^{c g}
- Epiplaterus ^{c g}
- Epitaphius ^{c g}
- Erichsonocis ^{c g}
- Erotylopsis ^{c g}
- Esocus ^{c g}
- Ethneca
- Etnalidius Kuschel, 1998^{g}
- Etnalis ^{c g}
- Euciodes ^{c g}
- Eucloeus ^{c g}
- Eucorynus ^{c g}
- Eucyclotropis ^{c g}
- Eugigas ^{c g}
- Eugonissus ^{c g}
- Eugonodes ^{c g}
- Eugonops ^{c g}
- Eugonus Schoenherr, 1833^{i c g b}
- Eupanteos ^{c g}
- Euparius Schoenherr, 1823^{i c g b} (fungus weevils)
- Euphloeobius ^{c g}
- Eurometopus ^{c g}
- Eurymycter LeConte, 1876^{i c g b}
- Euscelus
- Eusintor ^{c g}
- Eusphyrus LeConte, 1876^{i c g b}
- Euxenulus Valentine, 1960^{i c g b}
- Euxenus LeConte, 1876^{i c g b}
- Euxuthus ^{c g}
- Exechesops ^{c g}
- Exechontis ^{c g}
- Exilis ^{c g}
- Exillis Pascoe, 1860^{i c g}
- Exurodon ^{c g}
- Garyus ^{c g}
- Genethila ^{c g}
- Gibber ^{c g}
- Glaesotropis Gratshev & Zherikhin, 1995^{g}
- Gnathoxena ^{c g}
- Gnoticarina ^{c g}
- Gomphides ^{c g}
- Gomyaccudus Frieser, 1980^{g}
- Goniocloeus Jordan, 1904^{i c g b}
- Gonops ^{c g}
- Gonotropis LeConte, 1876^{i c g b}
- Griburiosoma ^{c g}
- Gulamentus ^{c g}
- Gymnognathus Schoenherr, 1826^{i c g b}
- Gynandrocerus ^{c g}
- Habrissus ^{c g}
- Habroxenus Valentine, 1998^{i g b}
- Hadromerina ^{c g}
- Haplopygus Kuschel, 1998^{g}
- Helmoreus Holloway, 1982^{g}
- Heniocera ^{c g}
- Hiera ^{c g}
- Holophloeus ^{c g}
- Holostilpna ^{c g}
- Homalorhamphus ^{c g}
- Homocloeus ^{c g}
- Homoeodera ^{c g}
- Homoeotropis ^{c g}
- Hoplorhaphus Holloway, 1982^{g}
- Hormiscops ^{c g}
- Howeanthribus ^{c g}
- Hucus ^{c g}
- Hybosternus ^{c g}
- Hylopemon ^{c g}
- Hylotribus ^{c g}
- Hypselotropis ^{c g}
- Hypseus ^{c g}
- Icospermus ^{c g}
- Idiopus
- Illis ^{c g}
- Indotaphius ^{c g}
- Isanthribus Holloway, 1982^{g}
- Ischnocerus Schoenherr, 1839^{i c g b}
- Japanthribus ^{c g}
- Jordanthribus ^{c g}
- Lagopezus ^{c g}
- Lawsonia Sharp, 1873^{g}
- Lemuricedus ^{c g}
- Leptonemus ^{c g}
- Lichenobius ^{c g}
- Limiophaula ^{c g}
- Litocerus ^{c g}
- Litotropis ^{c g}
- Macrocephalus Luo & Hu, 1999^{c g}
- Macrotrichius ^{c g}
- Mallorrhynchus ^{c g}
- Mauia Blackburn, 1885^{i c g}
- Mecocerina ^{c g}
- Mecocerinopis ^{c g}
- Mecocerus ^{c g}
- Meconemus ^{c g}
- Mecotarsus ^{c g}
- Mecotropis ^{c g}
- Meganthribus ^{c g}
- Megatermis ^{c g}
- Megax ^{c g}
- Melanopsacus ^{c g}
- Mentanus ^{c g}
- Merarius ^{c g}
- Meriolus ^{c g}
- Mesidiotropis ^{c g}
- Mesocranius Kuschel, 1998^{g}
- Messalius ^{c g}
- Mionus Kuschel, 1998^{g}
- Misthosima ^{c g}
- Misthosimella ^{c g}
- Monocloeus ^{c g}
- Monosirhapis ^{c g}
- Morphocera ^{c g}
- Mucronianus ^{c g}
- Mycteis ^{c g}
- Mylascopus ^{c g}
- Nausicus ^{c g}
- Neanthribus ^{c g}
- Nemotrichus ^{c g}
- Neoxenus Valentine, 1998^{i g b}
- Nerthomma ^{c g}
- Neseonos ^{c g}
- Nesidobius ^{c g}
- Nessia ^{c}
- Nessiabrissus ^{c g}
- Nessiara ^{c g}
- Nessiaropsis ^{c g}
- Nessiodocus ^{c g}
- Nistacares ^{c g}
- Notiana ^{c g}
- Notioxenus ^{c g}
- Notochoragus ^{c g}
- Notoecia ^{c g}
- Noxius ^{c g}
- Opanthribus ^{c g}
- Opisolia ^{c g}
- Ormiscus G. R. Waterhouse, 1845^{i c g b}
- Orthotropis ^{c g}
- Oxyconus ^{c g}
- Oxyderes ^{c g}
- Ozotomerus ^{c g}
- Pachygenia ^{c g}
- Paecilocaulus ^{c g}
- Palazia ^{c g}
- Panastius ^{c g}
- Pantorhaenas ^{c g}
- Papuatorhaenas ^{c g}
- Parablops
- Paramesus ^{c g}
- Paranthribus ^{c g}
- Paraphloeobius ^{c g}
- Parexillis ^{c g}
- Paropus ^{c g}
- Peltorrhinus ^{c g}
- Penestica ^{c g}
- Peribathys ^{c g}
- Perichoragus ^{c g}
- Perroudius Holloway, 1982^{g}
- Phaenithon Schönherr, 1826^{c g b}
- Phaeniton Schoenherr, 1823^{i}
- Phaenotheriolum ^{c g}
- Phaenotherion ^{c g}
- Phaenotheriopsis ^{c g}
- Phaenotheriosoma ^{c g}
- Phaenotherium ^{c g}
- Phaeochrotes ^{c g}
- Phanosolena ^{c g}
- Phaulimia ^{c g}
- Phides ^{c g}
- Phloeobiopsis ^{c g}
- Phloeobius Schoenherr, 1823^{i c g}
- Phloeomimus ^{c g}
- Phloeopemon ^{c g}
- Phloeophilus ^{c g}
- Phloeops ^{c g}
- Phloeotragus ^{c g}
- Phoenicobiella Cockerell, 1906^{i c g b}
- Phoenicobius ^{c g}
- Phrynoidius ^{c g}
- Physopterus ^{c g}
- Piesocorynus Dejean, 1834^{i g b}
- Piezobarra ^{c g}
- Piezocorynus ^{c g}
- Piezonemus ^{c g}
- Pilitrogus ^{c g}
- Pioenia ^{c g}
- Pioenidia ^{c g}
- Pistorhinus Kuschel, 1998^{g}
- Platyrhinus Clairville, 1798^{c}
- Platystomos ^{c g}
- Platystomus ^{c g}
- Plesiobasis ^{c g}
- Plintheria ^{c g}
- Polycorynus ^{c g}
- Proscoporhinus ^{c g}
- Proscoporrhinus ^{c g}
- Proscopus
- Protaedus ^{c g}
- Protomerus ^{c}
- †Protoscelis Medvdev, 1968
- Prototropis ^{c g}
- Pseudeuparius ^{c g}
- Pseudobasidissus ^{c g}
- Pseudocedus ^{c g}
- Pseudochoragus Petri, 1912^{i c g b}
- Pseudomecorhis ^{c g}
- Ptychoderes ^{c g}
- Raphitropis ^{c g}
- Rawasia ^{c g}
- Rhaphidotropis ^{c g}
- Rhaphitropis ^{c g}
- Rhinanthribus ^{c g}
- Rhinobrachys ^{c g}
- Rhinotropis ^{c g}
- Rhynapion ^{c g}
- Saperdirhynchus Scudder, 1893^{g}
- Schimatocheilus ^{c g}
- Scirtetinus ^{c g}
- Scymnopis ^{c g}
- Sharpius Holloway, 1982^{g}
- Sicanthus Valentine, 1998^{i g b}
- Sintor ^{c g}
- Sintorops ^{c g}
- Solox Kuschel, 1998^{g}
- Sophronus Kuschel, 1998^{g}
- Spatorrhamphus ^{c g}
- Sphinctotropis ^{c g}
- Stenocerus Schoenherr, 1826^{i c g b}
- Stenorhis ^{c g}
- Stenorhynchus Lamarck, 1818^{i c g}
- Sternocyphus ^{c g}
- Stiboderes ^{c g}
- Strabops ^{c g}
- Straboscopus ^{c g}
- Streneoderma ^{c g}
- Styphlochoragus ^{c g}
- Sympaector ^{c g}
- Synchoragus ^{c g}
- Syntophoderes ^{c g}
- Systaltocerus ^{c g}
- Taburnus ^{c g}
- Talpella ^{c g}
- Taphrodes ^{c g}
- Tapinidius ^{c g}
- Telala ^{c g}
- Telphes ^{c g}
- Teratanthribus ^{c g}
- Tetragonopterus
- Tophoderellus ^{c g}
- Tophoderes ^{c g}
- Toxonotus Lacordaire, 1866^{i c g b}
- Toxotropis ^{c g}
- Trachitropis ^{b}
- Trachycyphus ^{c g}
- Trachytropis Jordan, 1904^{i c g}
- Tribasileus Holloway, 1982^{g}
- Tribotropis ^{c g}
- Trigonorhinus Wollaston, 1861^{i c g b}
- Trigonorrhinus ^{c g}
- Triplodus ^{c g}
- Tropideres ^{c g}
- Tropiderinus ^{c g}
- Tropidivisus ^{c g}
- Tropidobasis ^{c g}
- Ulorhinus ^{c g}
- Uncifer ^{c g}
- Urodon ^{c g}
- Urodontus Louw, 1993^{i}
- Uterosomus ^{c g}
- Valenfriesia Alonso-Zarazaga & Lyal, 1999^{g}
- Vitalis
- Xanthoderopygus Senoh, 1984^{g}
- Xenanthribus ^{c g}
- Xenocerus ^{c g}
- Xenognathus ^{c}
- Xenopternis ^{c g}
- Xenorchestes ^{c g}
- Xenotropis ^{c g}
- Xylinada ^{c g}
- Xylinades ^{c g}
- Xylopoemon ^{c g}
- Xynotropis ^{c g}
- Xynotrupis ^{c g}
- Zopyrinus ^{c g}
- Zygaenodes ^{c g}

Data sources: i = ITIS, c = Catalogue of Life, g = GBIF, b = Bugguide.net
