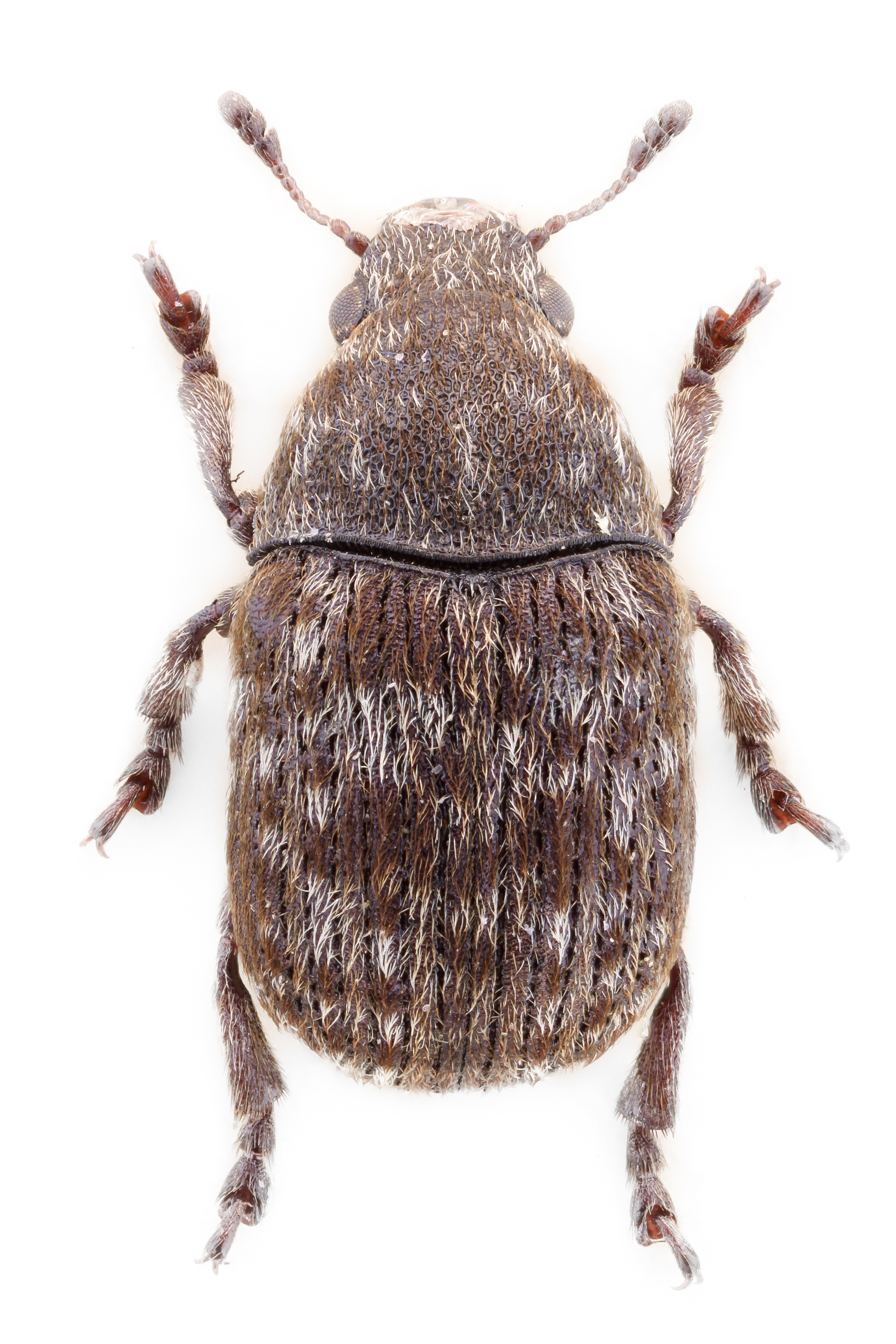
- Anthribus nebulosus

Scientific classification
- Kingdom: Animalia
- Phylum: Arthropoda
- Clade: Pancrustacea
- Class: Insecta
- Order: Coleoptera
- Suborder: Polyphaga
- Infraorder: Cucujiformia
- Superfamily: Curculionoidea
- Family: Anthribidae
- Subfamily: Anthribinae; Billberg, 1820

= Anthribinae =

Subfamily of beetles

Anthribinae is a subfamily of fungus weevils in the family of beetles known as Anthribidae. There are over 50 genera and more than 80 described species in Anthribinae.

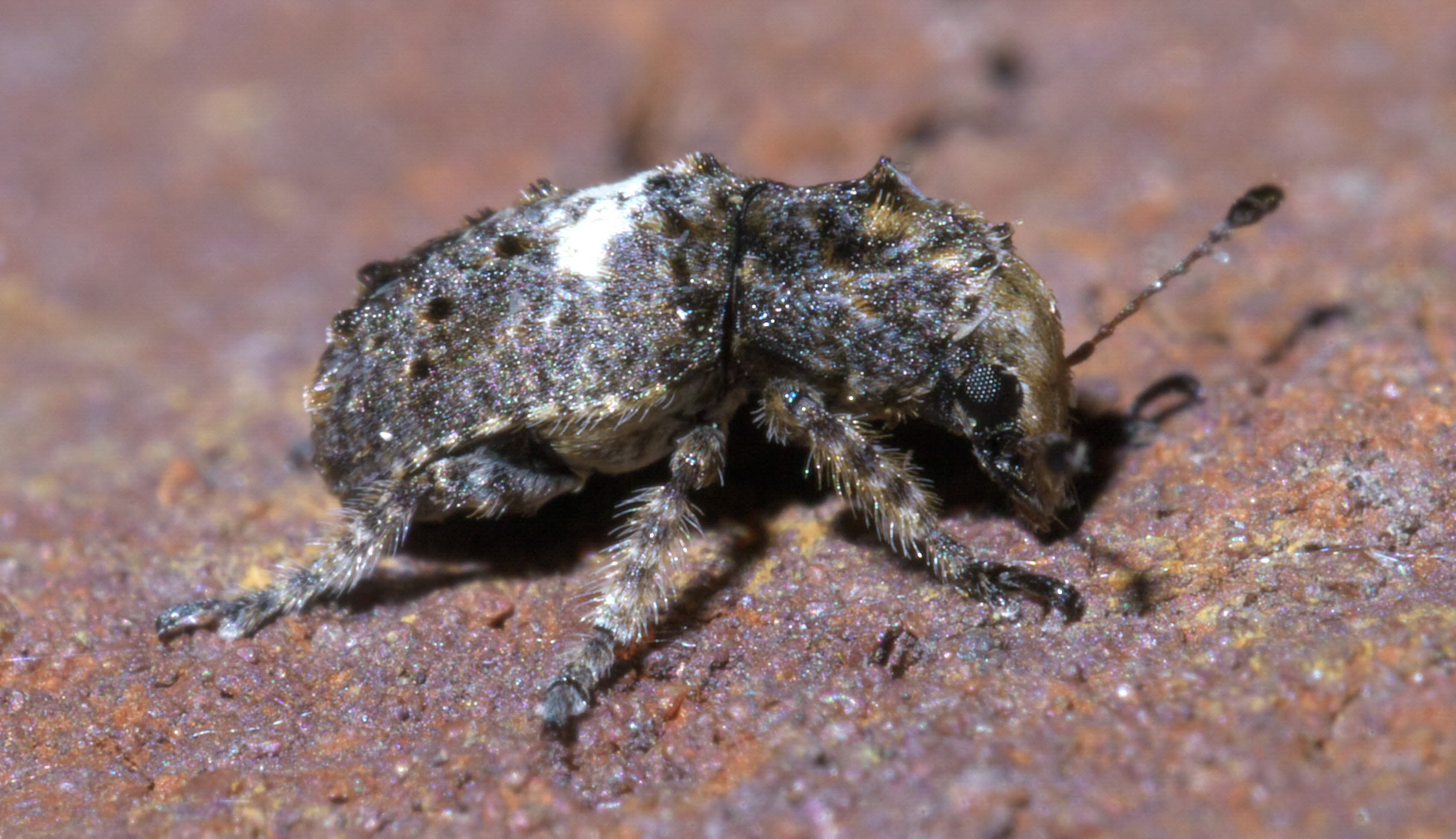
Toxonotus cornutus

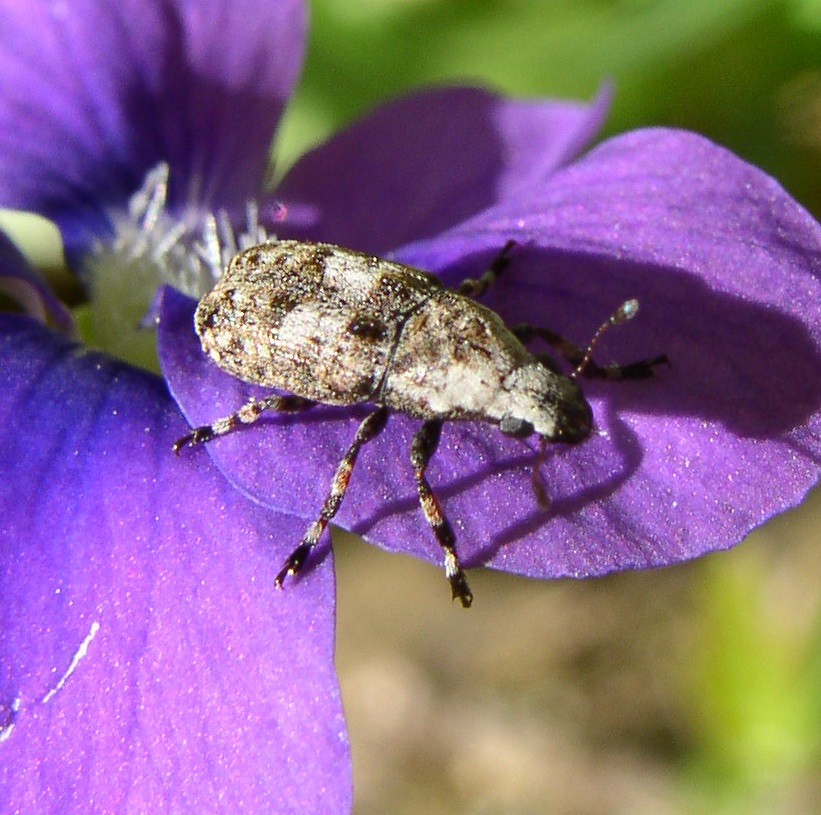
Euparius marmoreus

== Genera ==
- Acanthopygus Lucas, 1861^{n}
- Acorynus C.J.Schoenherr, 1833^{n}
- Allandrus LeConte, 1876^{i c g b}
- Anthribus Geoffroy, 1762^{i c g b n}
- Araeoderes Schaeffer, 1906^{i c g b}
- Brachycorynus Valentine, 1998^{i g b}
- Cacephatus T.Blackburn, 1900^{n}
- Chirotenon Labram & Imhoff, 1840^{n}
- Dendropemon C.J.Schoenherr, 1839^{n}
- Dinema Fairmaire, 1849^{i c g n}
- Discotenes Labram & Imhoff, 1839^{i c g b}
- Disphaerona K.Jordan, 1902^{n}
- Dissoleucas K.Jordan, 1925^{n}
- Enedreytes Schönherr, 1839^{n}
- Eucorynus Schoenherr, 1823^{n}
- Eugonus Schoenherr, 1833^{i c g b}
- Eupanteos Jordan, 1923^{n}
- Euparius Schoenherr, 1823^{i c g b n} (fungus weevils)
- Eurymycter LeConte, 1876^{i c g b}
- Eusphyrus LeConte, 1876^{i c g b}
- Exechesops C.J.Schoenherr, 1847^{n}
- Exillis Pascoe, 1860^{i c g}
- Goniocloeus Jordan, 1904^{i c g b}
- Gonotropis LeConte, 1876^{i c g b n}
- Gymnognathus Schoenherr, 1826^{i c g b}
- Helmoreus Holloway, 1982
- Hoherius Holloway, 1982
- Ischnocerus Schoenherr, 1839^{i c g b}
- Jordanthribus Zimmerman, 1938^{n}
- Lawsonia Sharp, 1873^{n}
- Mauia Blackburn, 1885^{i c g}
- Noxius K.Jordan, 1936^{n}
- Ormiscus G. R. Waterhouse, 1845^{i c g b n}
- Ozotomerus Perroud, 1853^{n}
- Peribathys K.Jordan, 1937^{n}
- Phaenithon Schönherr, 1826^{c g b}
- Phaeniton Schoenherr, 1823^{i}
- Phloeobius Schoenherr, 1823^{i c g n}
- Phoenicobiella Cockerell, 1906^{i c g b}
- Phymatus Holloway, 1982^{n}
- Piesocorynus Dejean, 1834^{i g b}
- Platyrhinus Clairville, 1798^{n}
- Platystomos Sharp, 1873^{n}
- Pleosporius Holloway, 1982^{n}
- Ptychoderes Schoenherr, 1823^{n}
- Rhaphitropis E.Reitter, 1916^{n}
- Sharpius Holloway, 1982^{n}
- Stenocerus Schoenherr, 1826^{i c g b}
- Telala Jordan, 1895^{n}
- Toxonotus Lacordaire, 1866^{i c g b n}
- Trachitropis^{b}
- Trachytropis Jordan, 1904^{i c g}
- Trigonorhinus Wollaston, 1861^{i c g b n}
- Tropideres C.J.Schoenherr, 1823^{n}
- Xenocerus C.J.Schoenherr, 1833^{n}
- Xylinada A.A.Berthold, 1827^{n}
- Xynotropis T.Blackburn, 1900^{n}

Data sources: i = ITIS, c = Catalogue of Life, g = GBIF, b = Bugguide.net n = NCBI

== North American tribes ==
- Anthribini
- Basitropidini
- Cratoparini
- Discotenini
- Gymnognathini
- Ischnocerini
- Piesocorynini
- Platyrhinini
- Platystomini
- Stenocerini
- Trigonorhinini
- Tropiderini
- Zygaenodini
