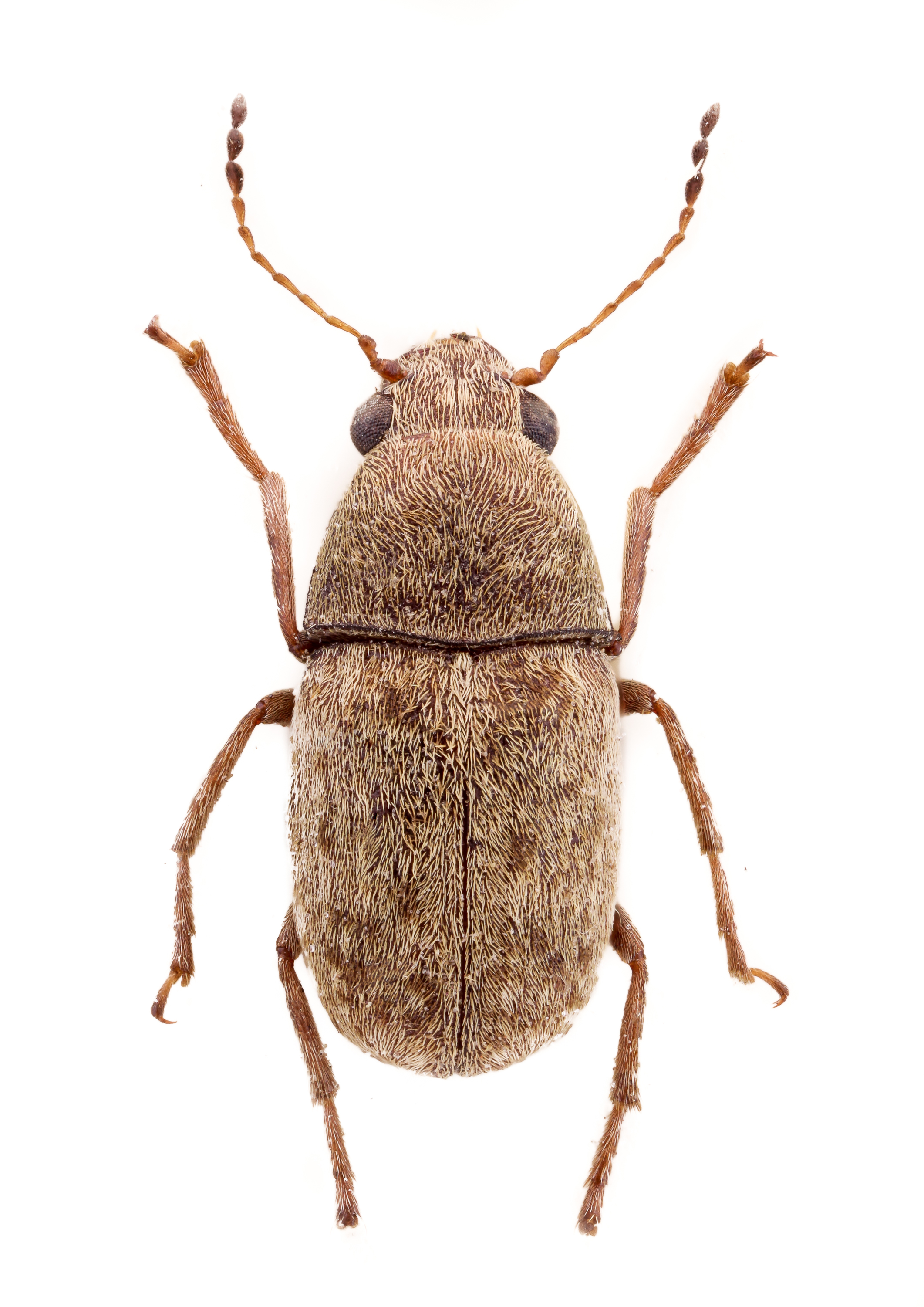
- Araecerus coffeae

Scientific classification
- Domain: Eukaryota
- Kingdom: Animalia
- Phylum: Arthropoda
- Class: Insecta
- Order: Coleoptera
- Suborder: Polyphaga
- Infraorder: Cucujiformia
- Family: Anthribidae
- Subfamily: Choraginae; Kirby, 1819

= Choraginae =

Subfamily of beetles

Choraginae is a subfamily of fungus weevils in the beetle family Anthribidae. There are about 9 genera and more than 180 described species in Choraginae.

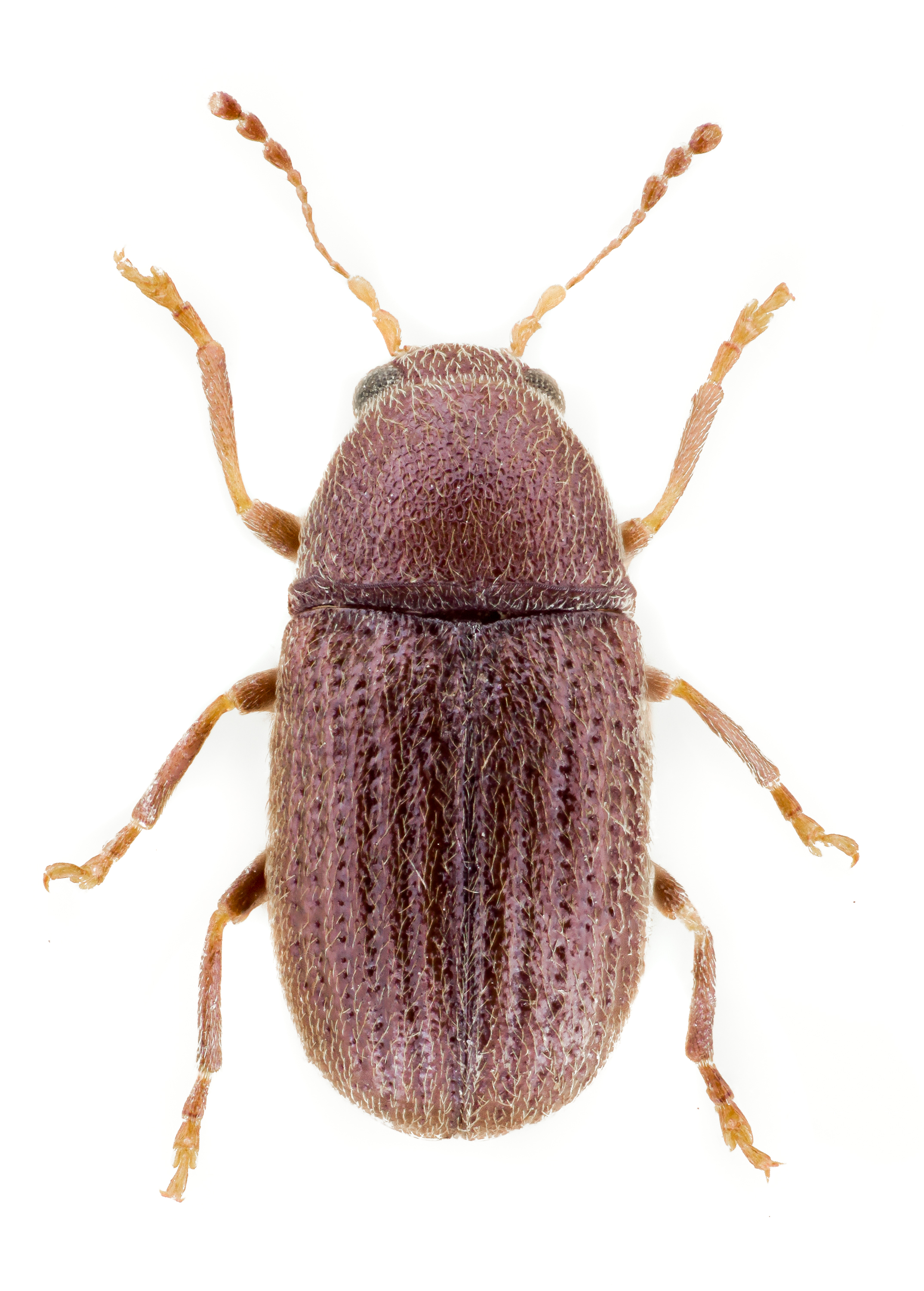
Choragus sheppardi

== Genera ==
These nine genera belong to the subfamily Choraginae:

- Acaromimus Jordan, 1907
- Araecerus Schoenherr, 1823
- Choragus Kirby, 1819
- Euxenulus Valentine, 1960
- Euxenus LeConte, 1876
- Habroxenus Valentine, 1998
- Neoxenus Valentine, 1998
- Pseudochoragus Petri, 1912
- Sicanthus Valentine, 1998
