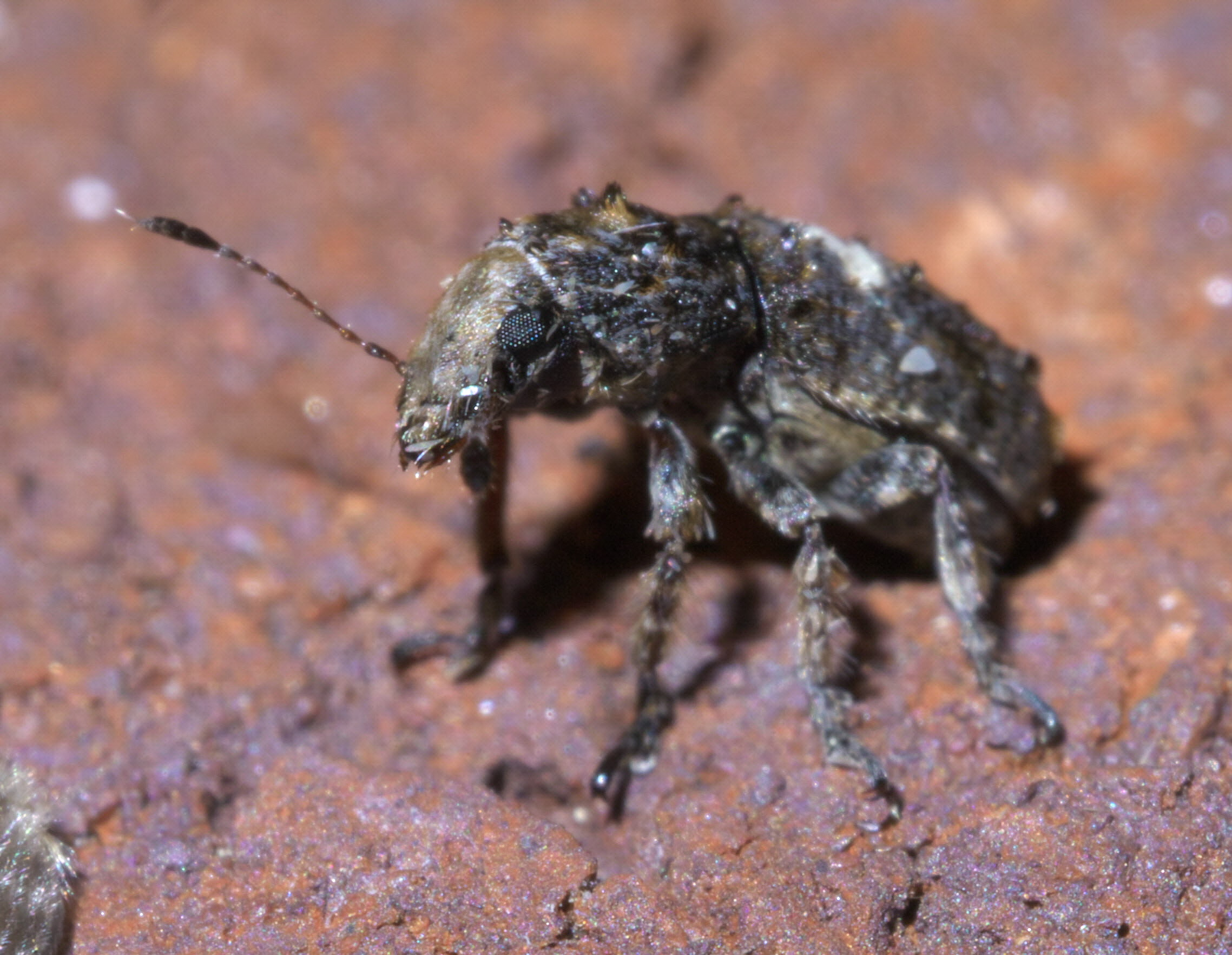
- Toxonotus cornutus

Scientific classification
- Domain: Eukaryota
- Kingdom: Animalia
- Phylum: Arthropoda
- Class: Insecta
- Order: Coleoptera
- Suborder: Polyphaga
- Infraorder: Cucujiformia
- Family: Anthribidae
- Subfamily: Anthribinae
- Tribe: Platystomini; Pierce, 1916

= Platystomini =

Tribe of beetles

Platystomini is a tribe of fungus weevils in the beetle family Anthribidae. There are 4 genera and over 100 described species in North America, and many others worldwide.

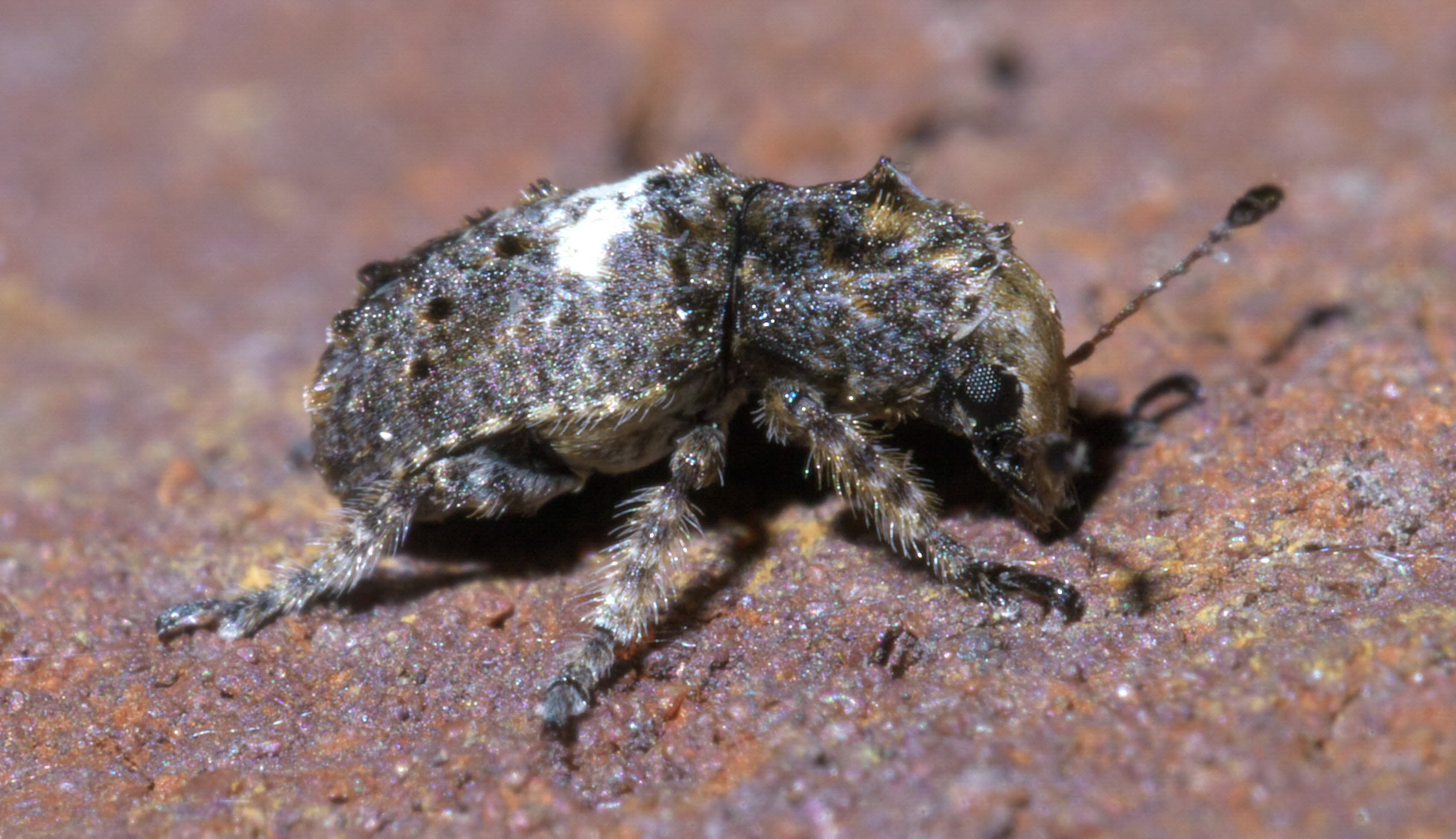
Toxonotus cornutus

== Genera ==
These genera belong to the tribe Platystomini:

- Alloplius
- Arecopais
- Brachylaenus
- Caenophloeobius
- Doeothena
- Entaphioides
- Epitaphius
- Euciodes
- Euphloeobius
- Exillis Pascoe, 1860
- Gulamentus
- Lawsonia
- Litotropis
- Mentanus
- Mylascopus
- Paraphloeobius
- Parexillis
- Penestica
- Phloeobiopsis
- Phloeobius Schoenherr, 1823
- Phloeomimus
- Phoenicobiella Cockerell, 1906
- Pioenidia
- Platystomos Schneider, 1791
- Toxonotus Lacordaire, 1866
- Tropidobasis
