= Urodon =

Urodon is the scientific name of two genera of organisms and may refer to:

- Urodon (beetle), a genus of insects in the family Anthribidae
- Urodon (plant), a genus of plants in the family Fabaceae
