= Brachycorynus hirsutus =

Scientific classification
- Domain: Eukaryota
- Kingdom: Animalia
- Phylum: Arthropoda
- Class: Insecta
- Order: Coleoptera
- Suborder: Polyphaga
- Infraorder: Cucujiformia
- Family: Anthribidae
- Genus: Brachycorynus
- Species: B. hirsutus

Binomial name
- Brachycorynus hirsutus Valentine, 1998

Species of beetle

Brachycorynus hirsutus is a species of fungus weevil in the beetle family Anthribidae. It is found in North America.
