= Plesiobasis =

Plesiobasis may refer to:

- Plesiobasis (beetle), a genus of beetles in the family Anthribidae
- Plesiobasis, a genus of flies in the family Tabanidae; synonym of Mackerrasus
