= Neoxenus versicolor =

Scientific classification
- Domain: Eukaryota
- Kingdom: Animalia
- Phylum: Arthropoda
- Class: Insecta
- Order: Coleoptera
- Suborder: Polyphaga
- Infraorder: Cucujiformia
- Family: Anthribidae
- Genus: Neoxenus
- Species: N. versicolor

Binomial name
- Neoxenus versicolor Valentine, 1998

Species of beetle

Neoxenus versicolor is a species of fungus weevil in the beetle family Anthribidae. It is found in Central America and North America.
