= Pseudochoragus nitens =

Scientific classification
- Kingdom: Animalia
- Phylum: Arthropoda
- Class: Insecta
- Order: Coleoptera
- Suborder: Polyphaga
- Infraorder: Cucujiformia
- Family: Anthribidae
- Genus: Pseudochoragus
- Species: P. nitens

Binomial name
- Pseudochoragus nitens (LeConte, 1884)

Species of beetle

Pseudochoragus nitens is a species of fungus weevil in the beetle family Anthribidae. It is found in North America.
