= Brachycorynus rectus =

Scientific classification
- Kingdom: Animalia
- Phylum: Arthropoda
- Class: Insecta
- Order: Coleoptera
- Suborder: Polyphaga
- Infraorder: Cucujiformia
- Family: Anthribidae
- Genus: Brachycorynus
- Species: B. rectus

Binomial name
- Brachycorynus rectus (LeConte, 1876)

Species of beetle

Brachycorynus rectus is a species of fungus weevil in the beetle family Anthribidae.
