= Discotenes nigrotuberculata =

Scientific classification
- Domain: Eukaryota
- Kingdom: Animalia
- Phylum: Arthropoda
- Class: Insecta
- Order: Coleoptera
- Suborder: Polyphaga
- Infraorder: Cucujiformia
- Family: Anthribidae
- Genus: Discotenes
- Species: D. nigrotuberculata

Binomial name
- Discotenes nigrotuberculata (Schaeffer, 1904)

Species of beetle

Discotenes nigrotuberculata is a species of fungus weevil in the beetle family Anthribidae. It is found in Central America and North America.
