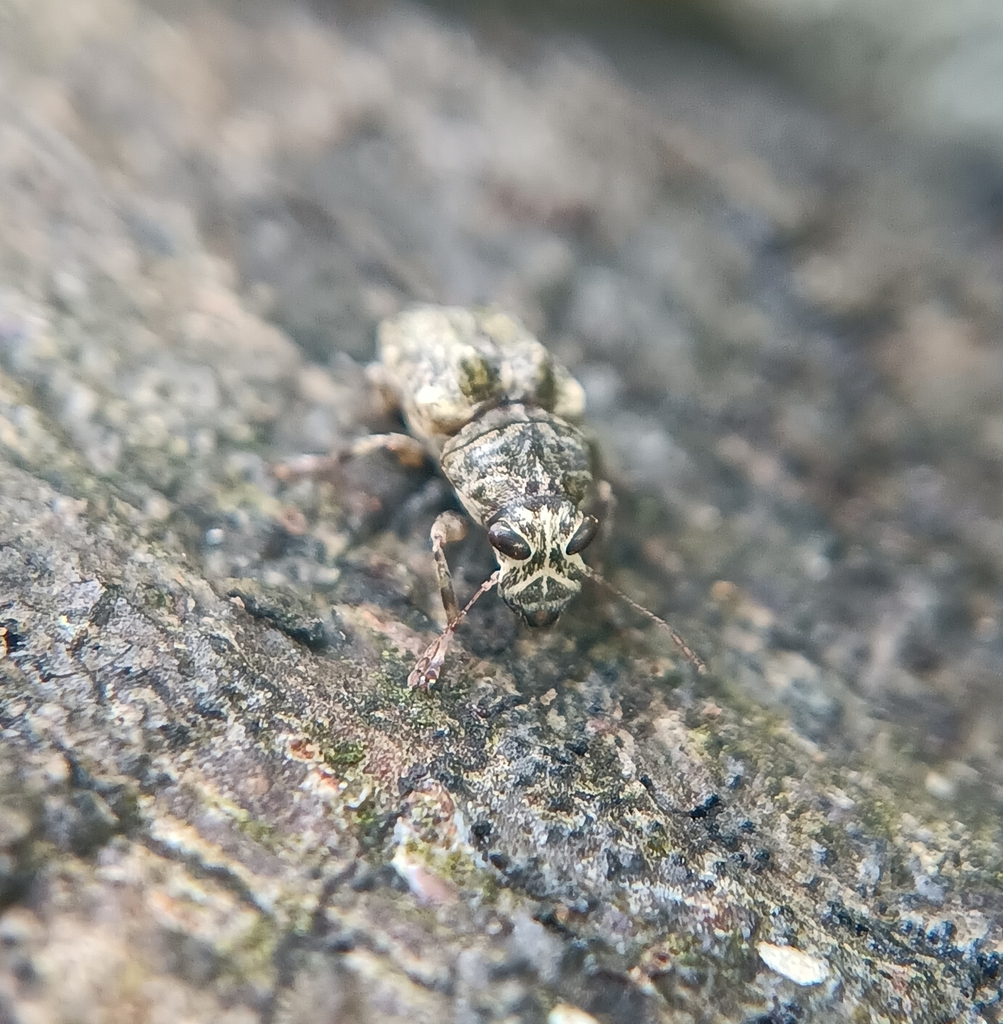
- On tree bark

Scientific classification
- Domain: Eukaryota
- Kingdom: Animalia
- Phylum: Arthropoda
- Class: Insecta
- Order: Coleoptera
- Suborder: Polyphaga
- Infraorder: Cucujiformia
- Family: Anthribidae
- Genus: Gibber
- Species: G. tuberculatus

Binomial name
- Gibber tuberculatus Jordan, 1895

= Gibber tuberculatus =

Species of weevil native to Taiwan

Gibber tuberculatus is a species of weevil native to Taiwan.

== Description ==
This species has dark brown eyes with a white line through the middle. The snout is long with a pattern looking like a pitchfork with a line through it, and white eye spots. It has a bumpy abdomen and a light brown overall coloration. Its mouth parts are small, sharp and reddish brown.
