= Zygaenodini =

Scientific classification
- Domain: Eukaryota
- Kingdom: Animalia
- Phylum: Arthropoda
- Class: Insecta
- Order: Coleoptera
- Suborder: Polyphaga
- Infraorder: Cucujiformia
- Family: Anthribidae
- Subfamily: Anthribinae
- Tribe: Zygaenodini; Lacordaire, 1866

Tribe of beetles

Zygaenodini is a tribe of fungus weevils in the family Anthribidae. There are at least 3 genera and 20 described species in Zygaenodini.

== Genera ==
These three genera belong to the tribe Zygaenodini:

- Araeoderes Schaeffer, 1906
- Eusphyrus LeConte, 1876
- Ormiscus G. R. Waterhouse, 1845
