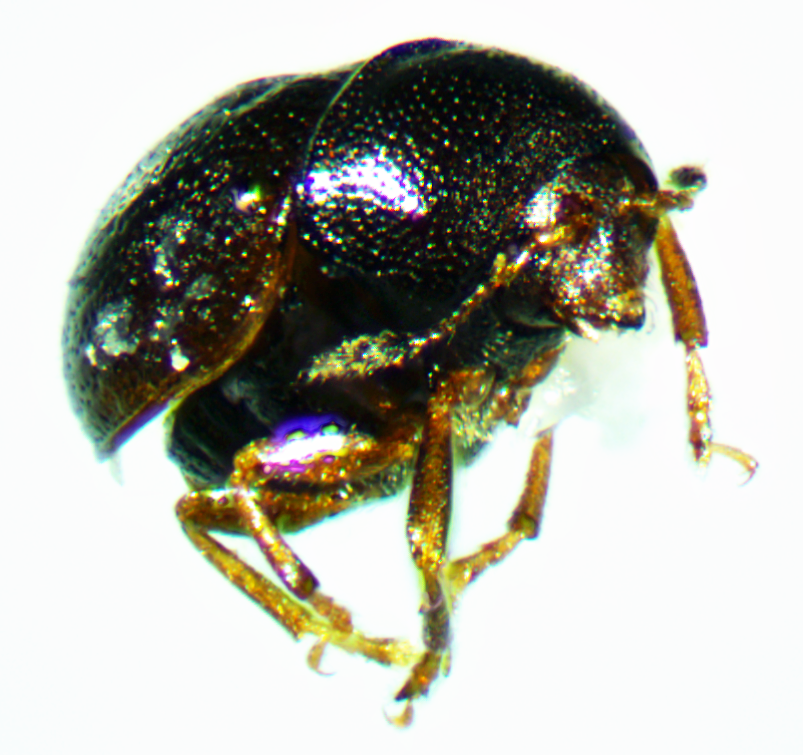

Scientific classification
- Kingdom: Animalia
- Phylum: Arthropoda
- Class: Insecta
- Order: Coleoptera
- Suborder: Polyphaga
- Infraorder: Cucujiformia
- Family: Anthribidae
- Genus: Euxenus
- Species: E. punctatus

Binomial name
- Euxenus punctatus LeConte, 1876

= Euxenus punctatus =

Species of beetle

Euxenus punctatus is a species of fungus weevil in the beetle family Anthribidae. It is found in North America.
