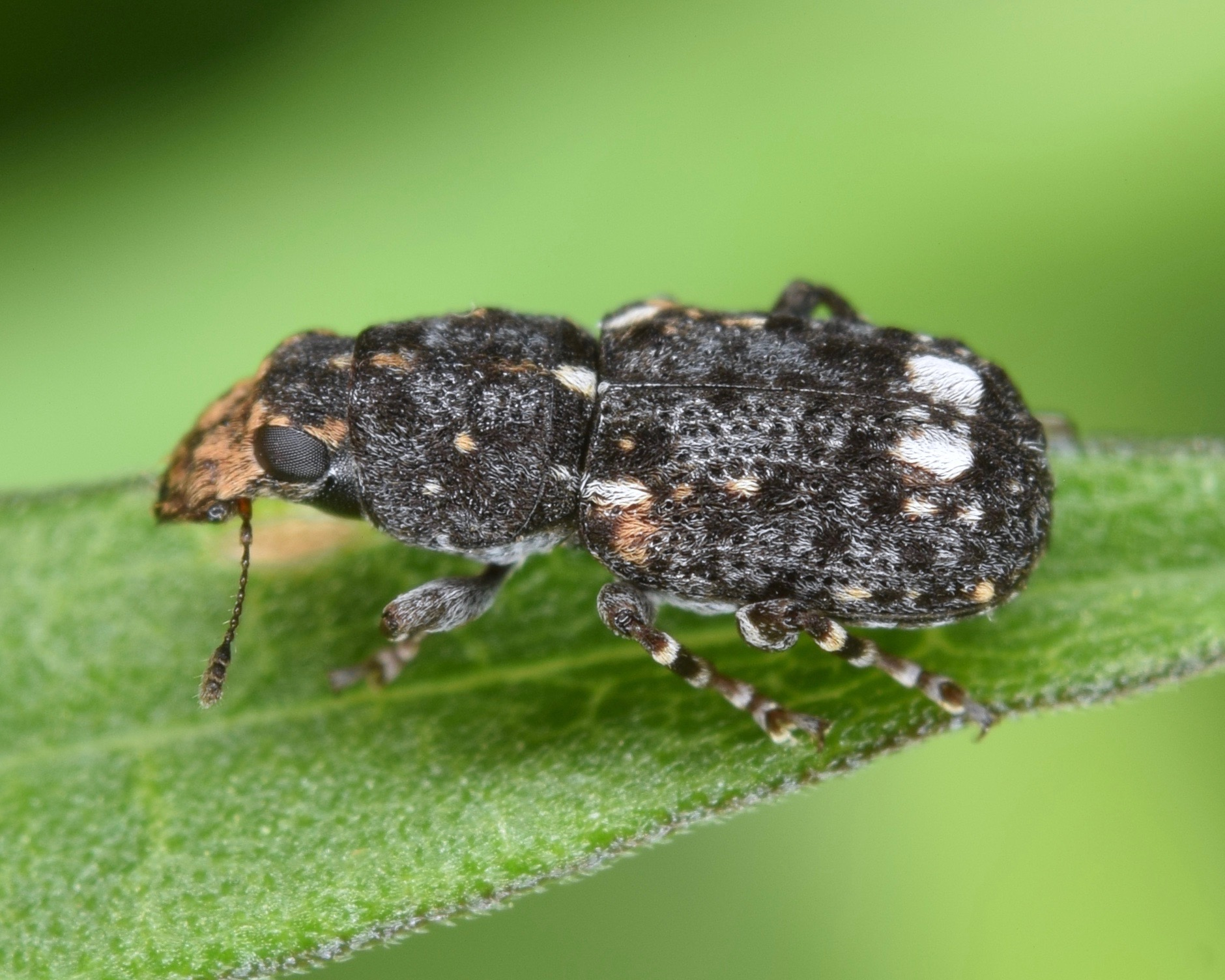

Scientific classification
- Kingdom: Animalia
- Phylum: Arthropoda
- Clade: Pancrustacea
- Class: Insecta
- Order: Coleoptera
- Suborder: Polyphaga
- Infraorder: Cucujiformia
- Superfamily: Curculionoidea
- Family: Anthribidae
- Genus: Goniocloeus
- Species: G. bimaculatus

Binomial name
- Goniocloeus bimaculatus (Olivier, 1795)

= Goniocloeus bimaculatus =

Species of beetle

Goniocloeus bimaculatus is a species of fungus weevil in the beetle family Anthribidae. It is found in North America.
