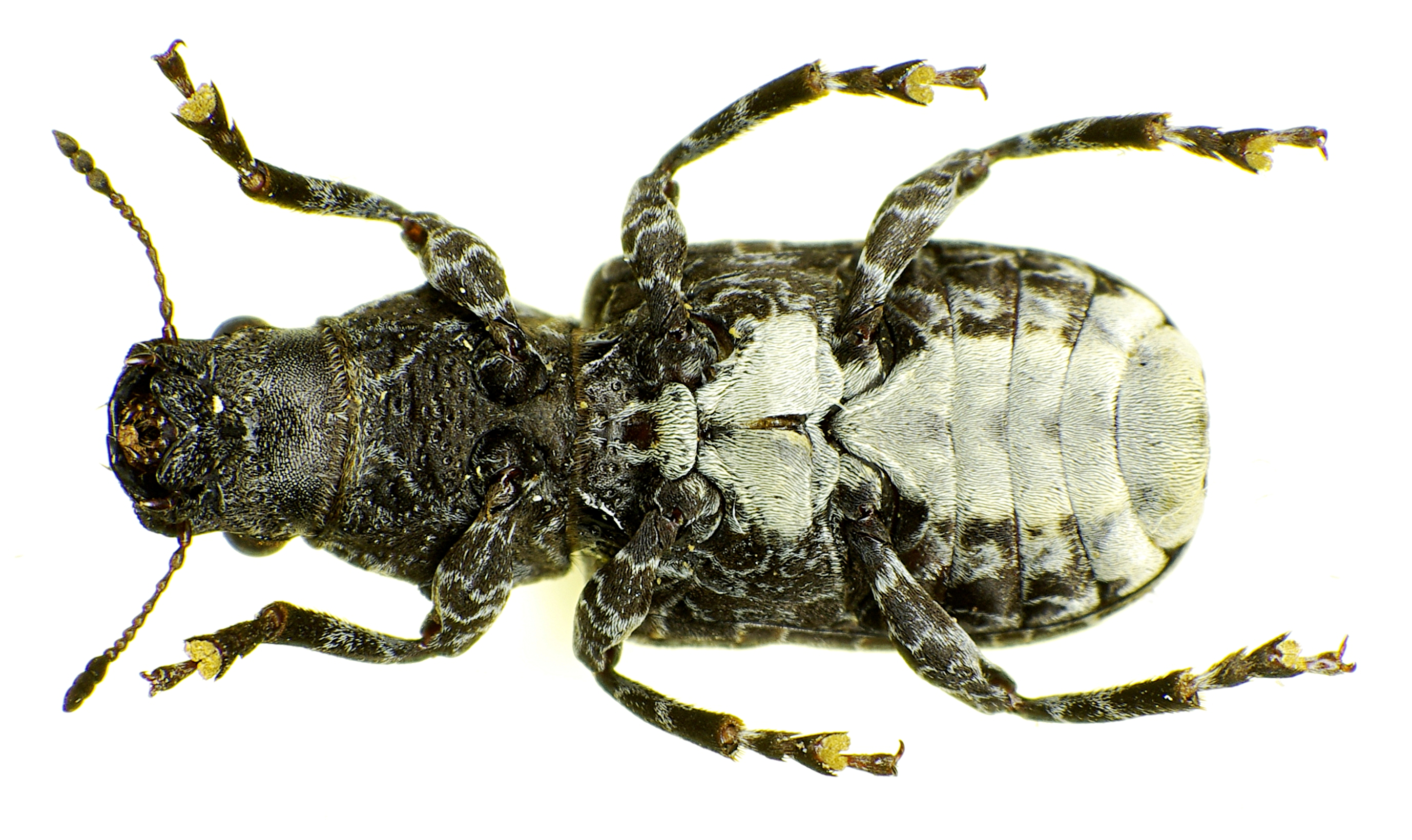
- Platyrhinus resinosus underside

Scientific classification
- Domain: Eukaryota
- Kingdom: Animalia
- Phylum: Arthropoda
- Class: Insecta
- Order: Coleoptera
- Suborder: Polyphaga
- Infraorder: Cucujiformia
- Family: Anthribidae
- Subfamily: Anthribinae
- Tribe: Platyrhinini; Imhoff, 1856

= Platyrhinini =

Tribe of beetles

Platyrhinini is a tribe of fungus weevils in the beetle family Anthribidae. There are at least 3 genera and more than 40 described species in Platyrhinini.

== Genera ==
These three genera belong to the tribe Platyrhinini:

- Goniocloeus Jordan, 1904
- Trachitropis
- Trachytropis Jordan, 1904
