= Acaromimus americanus =

Scientific classification
- Kingdom: Animalia
- Phylum: Arthropoda
- Class: Insecta
- Order: Coleoptera
- Suborder: Polyphaga
- Infraorder: Cucujiformia
- Family: Anthribidae
- Genus: Acaromimus
- Species: A. americanus

Binomial name
- Acaromimus americanus (Motschulsky, 1873)

Species of weevil beetle

Acaromimus americanus is a species of fungus weevil in the beetle family Anthribidae.
