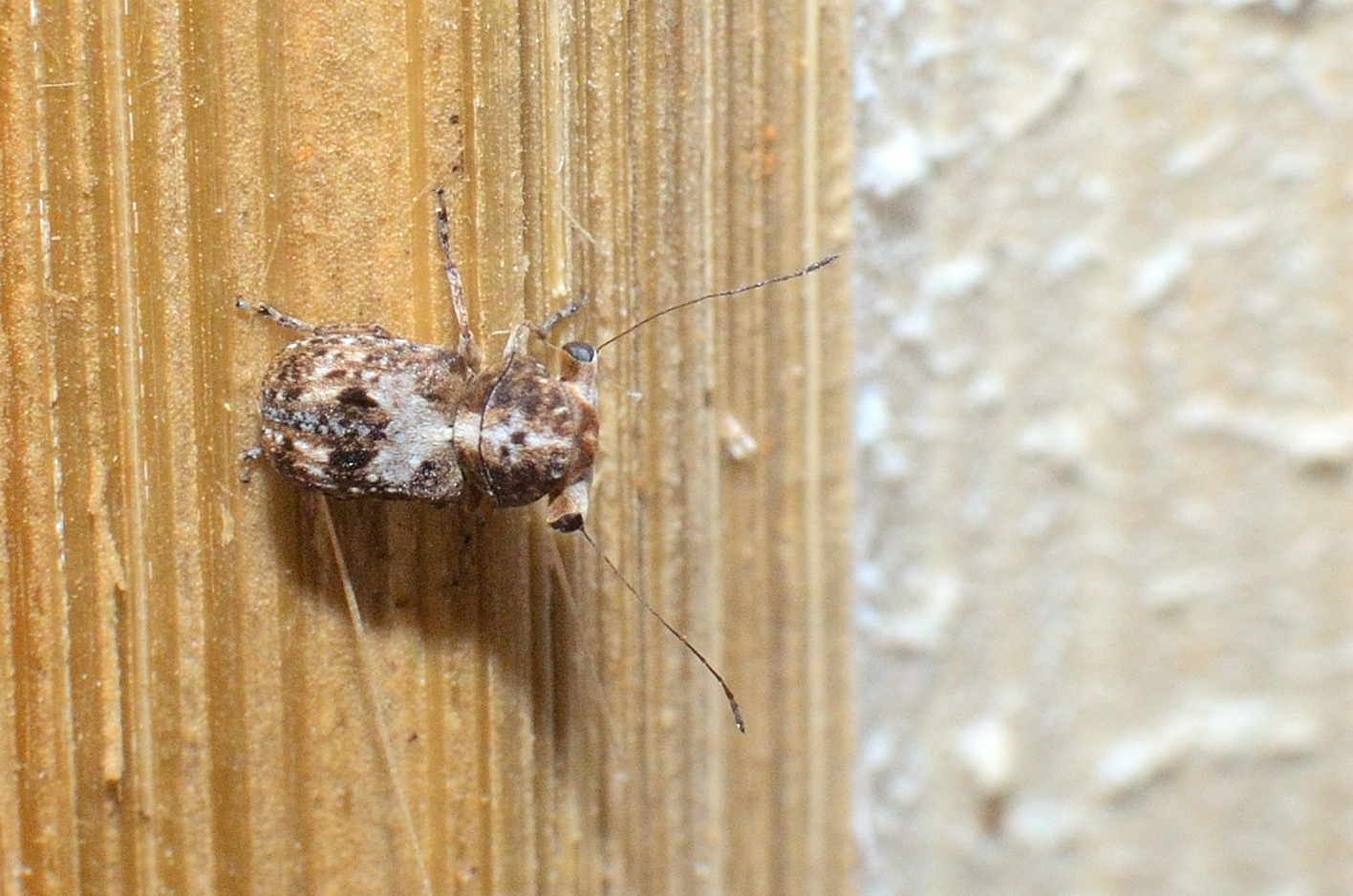

Scientific classification
- Kingdom: Animalia
- Phylum: Arthropoda
- Class: Insecta
- Order: Coleoptera
- Suborder: Polyphaga
- Infraorder: Cucujiformia
- Family: Anthribidae
- Subfamily: Anthribinae
- Genus: Exechesops; Schoenherr, 1847

= Exechesops =

Genus of beetles

External image
- Images at iNaturalist

Exechesops is a genus of beetles belonging to the family Anthribidae. Males of some species such as E. leucopis have a tubular eye projection, and the eye span determines outcomes of male-male combat.

The species of this genus are found in Eastern Europe, Southern Africa, Southeastern Asia.

== Species ==
Species:

- Exechesops acaulus Wolfrum, 1953
- Exechesops alces R.Frieser, 1995
- Exechesops antiallus Wolfrum, 1953
- Exechesops auritus Jordan, 1931
- Exechesops bakeri Wolfrum, 1953
- Exechesops becvari R.Frieser, 1995
- Exechesops bos Wolfrum, 1953
- Exechesops capensis (Jordan, 1928)
- Exechesops clivinus Wolfrum, 1953
- Exechesops convexipennis Wolfrum, 1960
- Exechesops coomani Wolfrum, 1953
- Exechesops cristatus Wolfrum, 1953
- Exechesops diopsideus Wolfrum, 1953
- Exechesops discoidalis Wolfrum, 1953
- Exechesops elenae Egorov
- Exechesops eminens Jordan, 1955
- Exechesops epipastus Wolfrum, 1955
- Exechesops fernandus Wolfrum, 1953
- Exechesops ferrealis (Jordan, 1930)
- Exechesops foliatus R.Frieser, 1995
- Exechesops fornicatus R.Frieser, 1995
- Exechesops glabriceps R.Frieser, 1997
- Exechesops griseus Wolfrum, 1953
- Exechesops helmiscus Wolfrum, 1953
- Exechesops holzschuhi R.Frieser, 1995
- Exechesops horni Wolfrum, 1953
- Exechesops infortunatus Wolfrum, 1953
- Exechesops isabella Wolfrum, 1960
- Exechesops jordani Wolfrum, 1953
- Exechesops kalshoveni Jordan, 1931
- Exechesops latifrons Wolfrum, 1953
- Exechesops latipes Wolfrum, 1953
- Exechesops latus Wolfrum, 1953
- Exechesops leptipus Jordan, 1931
- Exechesops leucopis Wolfrum, 1953
- Exechesops lituratus Wolfrum, 1953
- Exechesops lividipes R.Frieser, 1996
- Exechesops molitor Wolfrum, 1953
- Exechesops monstrosus Wolfrum, 1953
- Exechesops mopanae R.Frieser, 1993
- Exechesops phodinus Wolfrum, 1953
- Exechesops quadrituberculatus Schoenherr, 1848
- Exechesops quadrituberculatus Wolfrum, 1953
- Exechesops rectimargo Jordan, 1931
- Exechesops repletus R.Frieser, 1995
- Exechesops semnus Jordan, 1937
- Exechesops signatellus R.Frieser, 1995
- Exechesops simus Wolfrum, 1953
- Exechesops sobrinus R.Frieser, 1995
- Exechesops tenuipes R.Frieser, 1995
- Exechesops tibialis Wolfrum, 1953
- Exechesops triangularis Wolfrum, 1953
- Exechesops validus R.Frieser, 1998
- Exechesops vigens (Jordan, 1925)
- Exechesops wollastoni (Pascoe, 1859)
