= Strabops insignis =

Scientific classification
- Kingdom: Animalia
- Phylum: Arthropoda
- Class: Insecta
- Order: Coleoptera
- Suborder: Polyphaga
- Infraorder: Cucujiformia
- Family: Anthribidae
- Genus: Strabops; Jordan, 1904
- Species: S. insignis

Binomial name
- Strabops insignis Jordan, 1904

Genus of beetles

Strabops is a monotypic genus of fungus weevils in the family Anthribidae. It contains one species, Strabops insignis.
