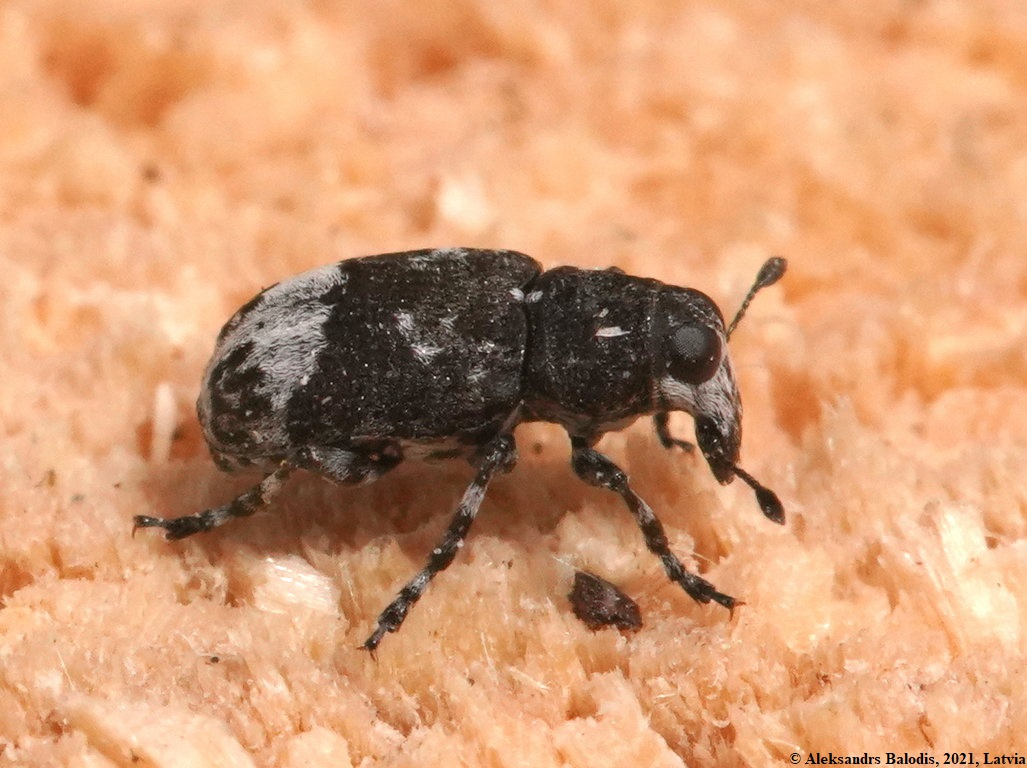
- 'Tropideres albirostris

Scientific classification
- Kingdom: Animalia
- Phylum: Arthropoda
- Class: Insecta
- Order: Coleoptera
- Suborder: Polyphaga
- Infraorder: Cucujiformia
- Family: Anthribidae
- Subfamily: Anthribinae
- Genus: Tropideres; Schönherr, 1823

= Tropideres =

Genus of beetles

Tropideres is a genus of insects belonging to the family Anthribidae.

The genus was first described by Carl Johan Schönherr in 1823.

The genus has cosmopolitan distribution.

Species:

- Tropideres acerbus Boheman, 1833
- Tropideres dorsalis
