= Sicanthus =

Scientific classification
- Domain: Eukaryota
- Kingdom: Animalia
- Phylum: Arthropoda
- Class: Insecta
- Order: Coleoptera
- Suborder: Polyphaga
- Infraorder: Cucujiformia
- Family: Anthribidae
- Subfamily: Choraginae
- Genus: Sicanthus; Valentine, 1998

Genus of beetles

Sicanthus is a genus of fungus weevils in the beetle family Anthribidae. There is one described species in Sicanthus, S. rhizophorae.
