= Urodontinae =

Scientific classification
- Kingdom: Animalia
- Phylum: Arthropoda
- Clade: Pancrustacea
- Class: Insecta
- Order: Coleoptera
- Suborder: Polyphaga
- Infraorder: Cucujiformia
- Superfamily: Curculionoidea
- Family: Anthribidae
- Subfamily: Urodontinae; Thomson, 1859

Subfamily of fungus-weevils

Urodontinae is subfamily of fungus-weevils in the family Anthribidae. It was first described by C.G. Thomson in 1859.

It contains one genus, Urodontus, with one species, Urodontus rotundicollis. They are found primarily in South Africa, but have also been spotted in Namibia and Zimbabwe. While experts agree on the validity of the genus Urodontus, debates are ongoing regarding its placement within the Tree of Life.
