= Discotenes =

Scientific classification
- Domain: Eukaryota
- Kingdom: Animalia
- Phylum: Arthropoda
- Class: Insecta
- Order: Coleoptera
- Suborder: Polyphaga
- Infraorder: Cucujiformia
- Family: Anthribidae
- Subfamily: Anthribinae
- Genus: Discotenes; Labram & Imhoff, 1839

Genus of beetles

Discotenes is a genus of fungus weevils in the beetle family Anthribidae. There are about nine described species in Discotenes.

== Species ==
These nine species belong to the genus Discotenes:

- Discotenes affinis Jordan
- Discotenes arizonica (Schaeffer, 1906)
- Discotenes coelebs Imhoff, 1842
- Discotenes consors Jordan, 1904
- Discotenes cylindratus Jordan
- Discotenes imitans Jordan
- Discotenes lutosus Jordan
- Discotenes nigrotuberculata (Schaeffer, 1904)
- Discotenes picticollis Jordan
