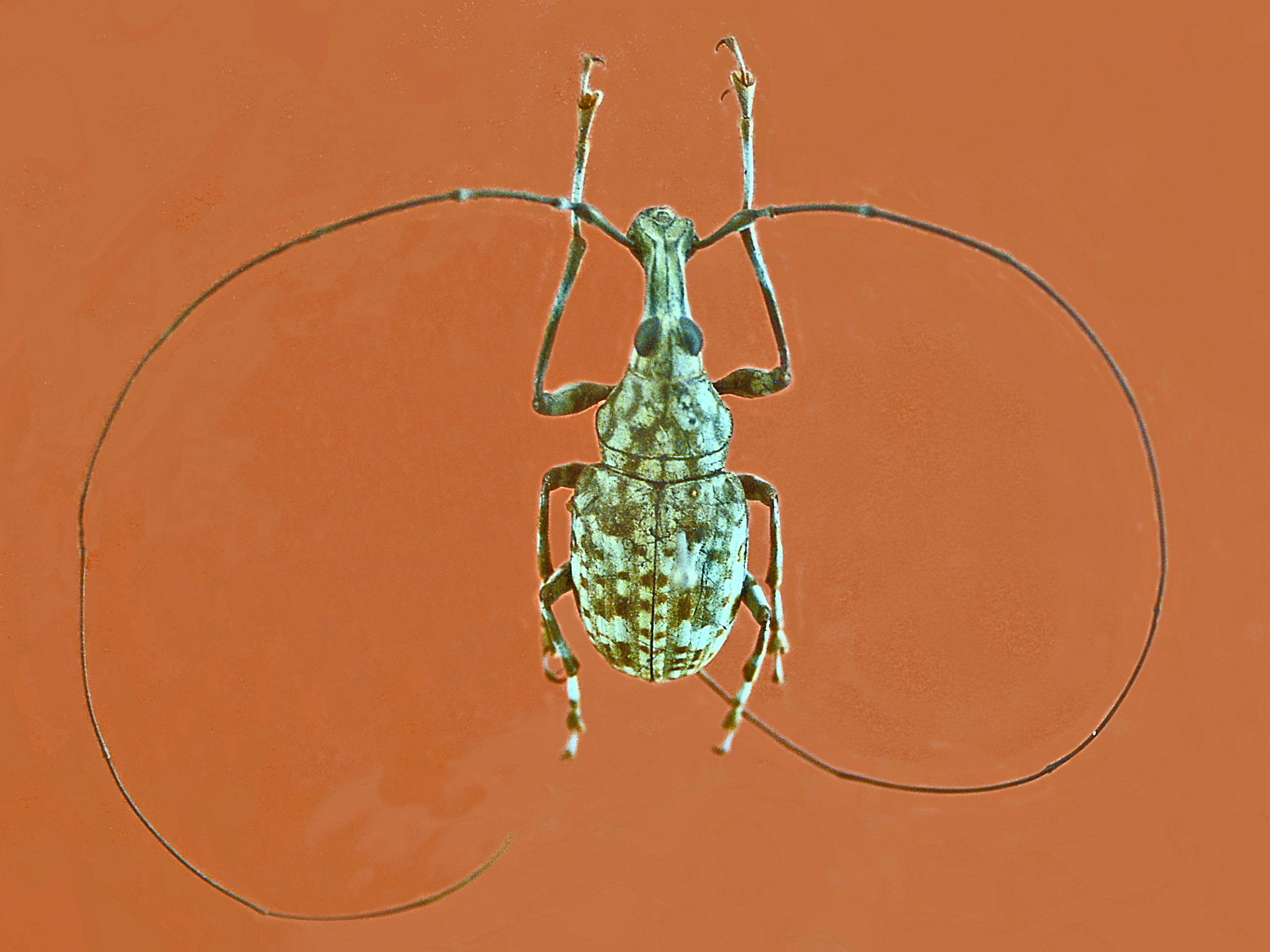
- Xylinades species. Museum specimen

Scientific classification
- Kingdom: Animalia
- Phylum: Arthropoda
- Class: Insecta
- Order: Coleoptera
- Suborder: Polyphaga
- Infraorder: Cucujiformia
- Family: Anthribidae
- Genus: Xylinades; Latreille, 1828

= Xylinades =

Genus of beetles

Xylinades is a genus of beetles from the family Anthribidae.

== Species ==
- Xylinades acuticornis
- Xylinades adductus
- Xylinades affinis
- Xylinades alternans
- Xylinades andamanensis
- Xylinades annulipes
- Xylinades armatus
- Xylinades aruensis
- Xylinades aspericollis
- Xylinades atricornis
- Xylinades beesoni
- Xylinades carbo
- Xylinades compar
- Xylinades foveatus
- Xylinades funereus
- Xylinades furus
- Xylinades fustis
- Xylinades hopei
- Xylinades indignus
- Xylinades integer
- Xylinades japonicus
- Xylinades lanugicornis
- Xylinades lanuginosus
- Xylinades limbalis
- Xylinades maculipes
- Xylinades moles
- Xylinades moluccensis
- Xylinades montanus
- Xylinades moratus
- Xylinades nodicornis
- Xylinades ochripes
- Xylinades opulentus
- Xylinades parumsignatus
- Xylinades pertyi
- Xylinades philippinensis
- Xylinades phycus
- Xylinades plagiatus
- Xylinades princeps
- Xylinades roelofsi
- Xylinades rufopictus
- Xylinades rugiceps
- Xylinades rugicollis
- Xylinades rugosus
- Xylinades simillimus
- Xylinades singularis
- Xylinades sinuaticollis
- Xylinades striatifrons
- Xylinades sulcifrons
- Xylinades tamilanus
- Xylinades tardus
- Xylinades thomasius
- Xylinades tuberculosus
- Xylinades westermanni
- Xylinades whiteheadi
- Xylinades vicinus
