= Nemotrichus =

Scientific classification
- Kingdom: Animalia
- Phylum: Arthropoda
- Class: Insecta
- Order: Coleoptera
- Suborder: Polyphaga
- Infraorder: Cucujiformia
- Family: Anthribidae
- Genus: Nemotrichus; Labram & Imhoff, 1838

Genus of insects

Nemotrichus is a genus of beetles belonging to the family Anthribidae.

The species of this genus are found in Southern America.

Species:

- Nemotrichus andicola Jordan, 1904
- Nemotrichus angulatus Jordan, 1906
