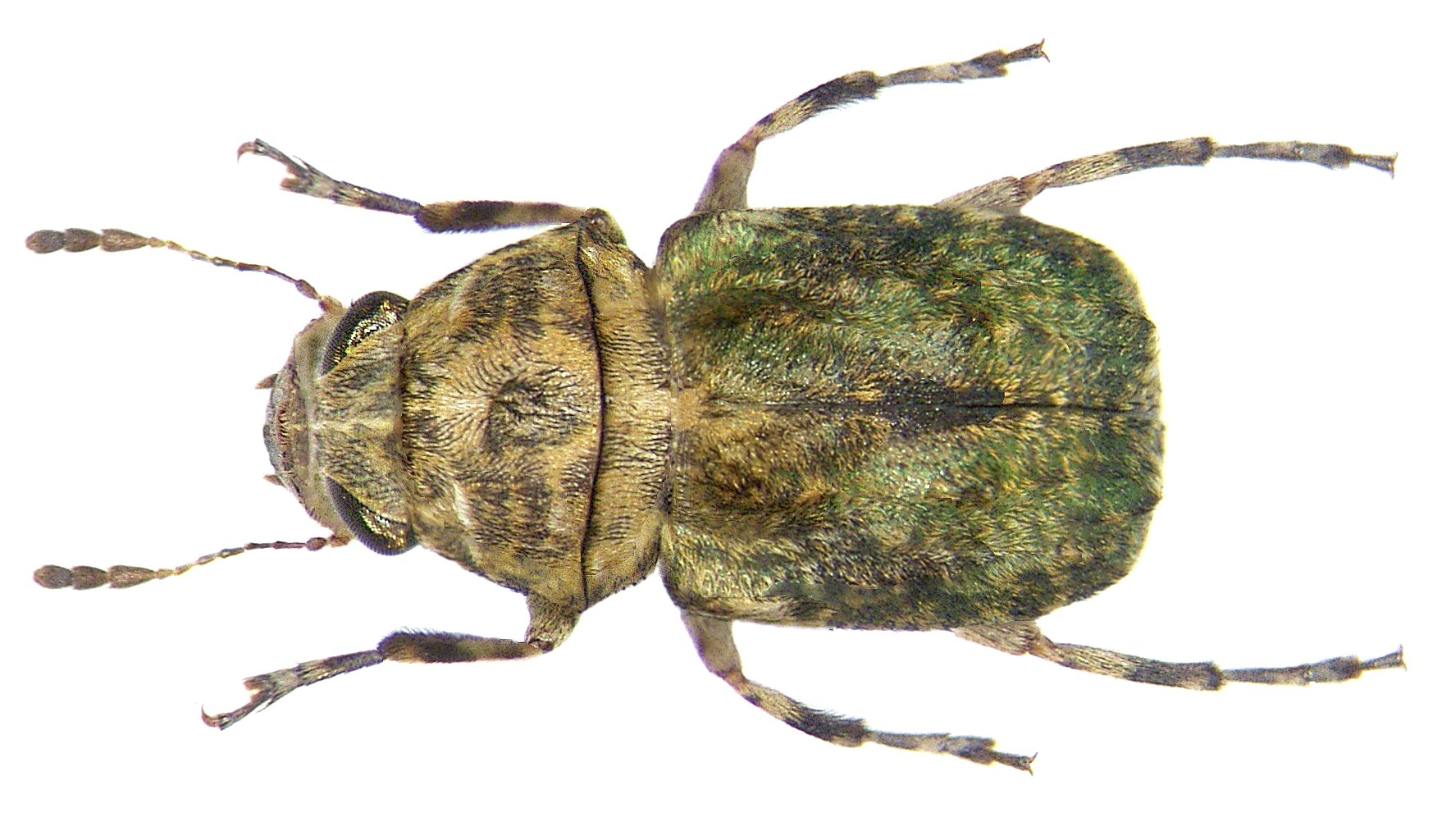
- Gibber tuberculatus

Scientific classification
- Domain: Eukaryota
- Kingdom: Animalia
- Phylum: Arthropoda
- Class: Insecta
- Order: Coleoptera
- Suborder: Polyphaga
- Infraorder: Cucujiformia
- Family: Anthribidae
- Genus: Gibber; Jordan, 1895

Type species
- Gibber tuberculatus Jordan, 1895

= Gibber (beetle) =

Genus of weevils

Gibber is a genus of weevils in the family Anthribidae, erected by Karl Jordan in 1895.

== Species ==
The following species are included:

- Gibber bicornis Frieser, 1995
- Gibber brevirostris (Sharp, 1891)
- Gibber callistus Jordan, 1924
- Gibber frenatus Jordan, 1924
- Gibber incisus (Sharp, 1891)
- Gibber invenustus Frieser, 1991
- Gibber minor Wolfrum, 1948
- Gibber nodulosus (Sharp, 1891)
- Gibber ogasawarensis Morimoto, 1981
- Gibber tuberculatus Jordan, 1895
