= Neoxenus =

Scientific classification
- Domain: Eukaryota
- Kingdom: Animalia
- Phylum: Arthropoda
- Class: Insecta
- Order: Coleoptera
- Suborder: Polyphaga
- Infraorder: Cucujiformia
- Family: Anthribidae
- Tribe: Araecerini
- Genus: Neoxenus; Valentine, 1998

Genus of beetles

Neoxenus is a genus of fungus weevils in the beetle family Anthribidae. There are about six described species in Neoxenus.

== Species ==
These six species belong to the genus Neoxenus:

- Neoxenus ater (Jordan, 1907)
- Neoxenus corrugatus Mermudes
- Neoxenus globosus Poinar & Legalov, 2016
- Neoxenus pallipes (Suffrian, 1870)
- Neoxenus polius (Jordan, 1907)
- Neoxenus versicolor Valentine, 1998
