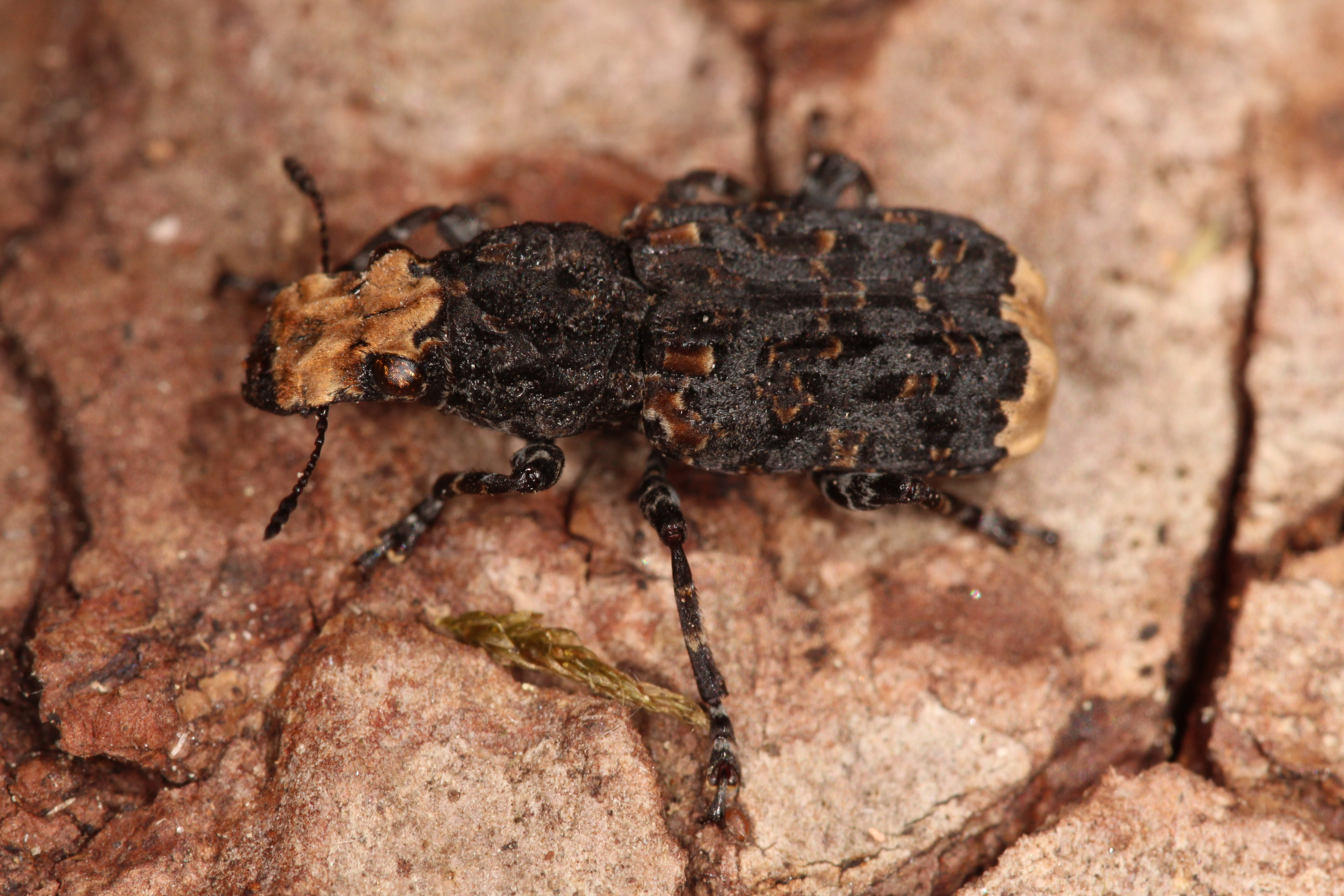
- Platyrhinus resinosus from Ortenaukreis, Germany

Scientific classification
- Kingdom: Animalia
- Phylum: Arthropoda
- Clade: Pancrustacea
- Class: Insecta
- Order: Coleoptera
- Suborder: Polyphaga
- Infraorder: Cucujiformia
- Family: Anthribidae
- Genus: Platyrhinus; Clairville, 1798

= Platyrhinus =

Genus of beetles

Platyrhinus is a genus of beetles belonging to the family Anthribidae.

The species of this genus are found in Europe.

Species:

- Platyrhinus aculeatus Schönherr, 1839
- Platyrhinus albinus Billberg, 1820
- Platyrhinus resinosus Scopoli, J.A., 1763
