= Habroxenus =

Scientific classification
- Domain: Eukaryota
- Kingdom: Animalia
- Phylum: Arthropoda
- Class: Insecta
- Order: Coleoptera
- Suborder: Polyphaga
- Infraorder: Cucujiformia
- Family: Anthribidae
- Tribe: Araecerini
- Genus: Habroxenus; Valentine, 1998

Genus of beetles

Habroxenus is a genus of fungus weevils in the beetle family Anthribidae. There is one described species in Habroxenus, H. politus.
