= Acaromimus =

Scientific classification
- Domain: Eukaryota
- Kingdom: Animalia
- Phylum: Arthropoda
- Class: Insecta
- Order: Coleoptera
- Suborder: Polyphaga
- Infraorder: Cucujiformia
- Family: Anthribidae
- Tribe: Araecerini
- Genus: Acaromimus; Jordan, 1907

Genus of beetles

Acaromimus is a genus of fungus weevils in the beetle family Anthribidae. There are at least two described species in Acaromimus.

== Species ==
These two species belong to the genus Acaromimus:

- Acaromimus americanus (Motschulsky, 1873)
- Acaromimus sharpi Jordan, 1906
