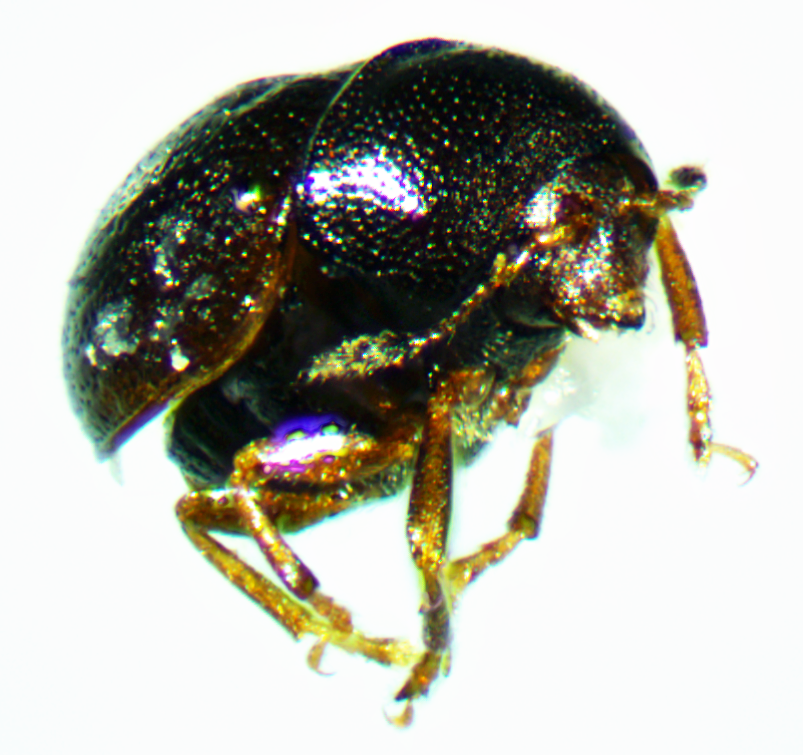
- E. punctatus

Scientific classification
- Kingdom: Animalia
- Phylum: Arthropoda
- Clade: Pancrustacea
- Class: Insecta
- Order: Coleoptera
- Suborder: Polyphaga
- Infraorder: Cucujiformia
- Superfamily: Curculionoidea
- Family: Anthribidae
- Tribe: Choragini
- Genus: Euxenus; LeConte, 1876

= Euxenus =

Genus of beetles

Euxenus is a genus of fungus weevils in the beetle family Anthribidae. There are about 14 described species in Euxenus.

== Species ==
These 14 species belong to the genus Euxenus:

- Euxenus acanthoceroides Wolfrum, 1930
- Euxenus apicalis Faust, 1896
- Euxenus ater Blatchley, 1928
- Euxenus gracillimus Hustache, 1930
- Euxenus jordani Valentine, 1991
- Euxenus obscurus Hustache, 1930
- Euxenus orchestoides Hustache, 1930
- Euxenus ornatipennis Champion, 1905
- Euxenus piceus Lec., 1878
- Euxenus posticus Faust, 1896
- Euxenus punctatus LeConte, 1876
- Euxenus rhombifer Champion, 1905
- Euxenus subparallelus Champion, 1905
- Euxenus variegatus Hustache, 1924
