= Araeoderes =

Scientific classification
- Domain: Eukaryota
- Kingdom: Animalia
- Phylum: Arthropoda
- Class: Insecta
- Order: Coleoptera
- Suborder: Polyphaga
- Infraorder: Cucujiformia
- Family: Anthribidae
- Tribe: Zygaenodini
- Genus: Araeoderes; Schaeffer, 1906

Genus of beetles

Araeoderes is a genus of fungus weevils in the beetle family Anthribidae. There is one described species in Araeoderes, A. texanus.
