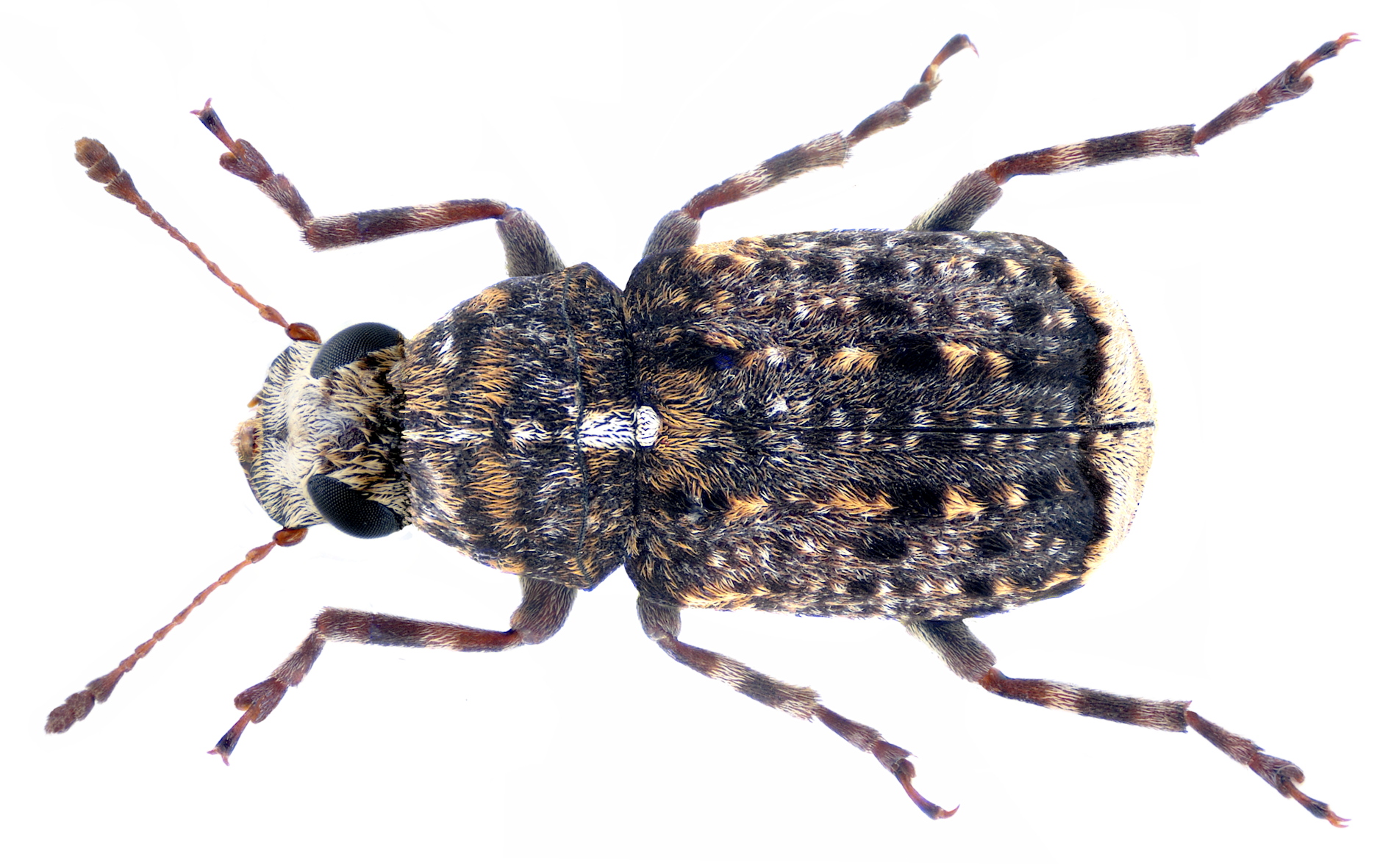
- Dissoleucas niveirostris

Scientific classification
- Domain: Eukaryota
- Kingdom: Animalia
- Phylum: Arthropoda
- Class: Insecta
- Order: Coleoptera
- Suborder: Polyphaga
- Infraorder: Cucujiformia
- Family: Anthribidae
- Genus: Dissoleucas; Jordan, 1925

= Dissoleucas =

Genus of beetles

Dissoleucas is a genus of beetles belonging to the family Anthribidae.

The species of this genus are found in Europe.

Species:

- Dissoleucas brevirostris Wolfrum, 1953
- Dissoleucas niveirostris (Fabricius, 1798)
