= Pseudochoragus =

Scientific classification
- Domain: Eukaryota
- Kingdom: Animalia
- Phylum: Arthropoda
- Class: Insecta
- Order: Coleoptera
- Suborder: Polyphaga
- Infraorder: Cucujiformia
- Family: Anthribidae
- Tribe: Choragini
- Genus: Pseudochoragus; Petri, 1912

Genus of beetles

Pseudochoragus is a genus of fungus weevils in the beetle family Anthribidae. There are about six described species in Pseudochoragus.

== Species ==
These six species belong to the genus Pseudochoragus:

- Pseudochoragus bostrychoides Fahrs., 1839
- Pseudochoragus brachycerus Petri, 1912
- Pseudochoragus brachyderus Petri, 1926
- Pseudochoragus brachyserus Wolfrum, 1953
- Pseudochoragus nitens (LeConte, 1884)
- Pseudochoragus piceus Wolfrum, 1953
