= Plesiobasis (beetle) =

Scientific classification
- Kingdom: Animalia
- Phylum: Arthropoda
- Class: Insecta
- Order: Coleoptera
- Suborder: Polyphaga
- Infraorder: Cucujiformia
- Family: Anthribidae
- Genus: Plesiobasis; K.Jordan, 1939

Genus of beetles

Plesiobasis is a genus of fungus weevil.

== Species ==
There are 9 species assigned to this genus:

- Plesiobasis brunneovarius Frieser, 1992
- Plesiobasis centralis Wolfrum, 1959
- Plesiobasis charax Jordan, 1939
- Plesiobasis dorsalis Kuschel, 1998
- Plesiobasis externa Wolfrum, 1959
- Plesiobasis grallina Jordan, 1939
- Plesiobasis monera Jordan, 1939
- Plesiobasis multiguttatus Frieser, 1992
- Plesiobasis phelos Jordan, 1939
