= Rhaphitropis =

Scientific classification
- Kingdom: Animalia
- Phylum: Arthropoda
- Class: Insecta
- Order: Coleoptera
- Suborder: Polyphaga
- Infraorder: Cucujiformia
- Family: Anthribidae
- Genus: Rhaphitropis; Reitter, 1916

Genus of beetles

Rhaphitropis is a genus of beetles belonging to the family Anthribidae.

The species of this genus are found in Europe and Japan.

Species:

- Rhaphitropis acutedentata Frieser, 1987
- Rhaphitropis angustula Frieser, 1995
