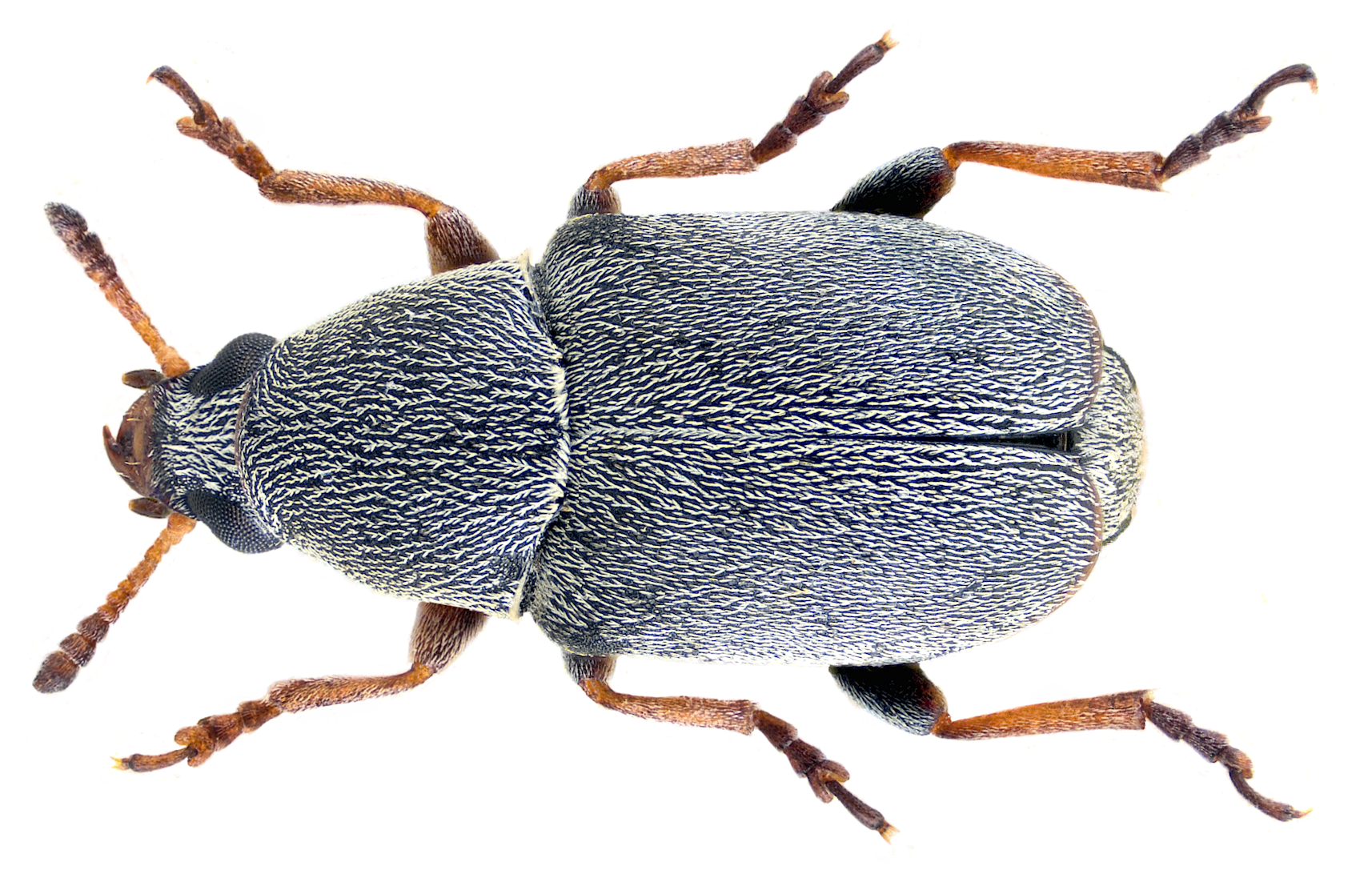
- Urodon rufipes

Scientific classification
- Kingdom: Animalia
- Phylum: Arthropoda
- Clade: Pancrustacea
- Class: Insecta
- Order: Coleoptera
- Suborder: Polyphaga
- Infraorder: Cucujiformia
- Superfamily: Curculionoidea
- Family: Anthribidae
- Genus: Urodon; Schönherr, 1823

= Urodon (beetle) =

Genus of beetles

Urodon is a genus of fungus weevils in the family of beetles known as Anthribidae.
