= Brachycorynus =

Scientific classification
- Domain: Eukaryota
- Kingdom: Animalia
- Phylum: Arthropoda
- Class: Insecta
- Order: Coleoptera
- Suborder: Polyphaga
- Infraorder: Cucujiformia
- Family: Anthribidae
- Tribe: Piesocorynini
- Genus: Brachycorynus; Valentine, 1998

Genus of beetles

Brachycorynus is a genus of fungus weevils in the beetle family Anthribidae. There are at least three described species in Brachycorynus.

== Species ==
These three species belong to the genus Brachycorynus:

- Brachycorynus distentus (Frieser, 1983)
- Brachycorynus hirsutus Valentine, 1998
- Brachycorynus rectus (LeConte, 1876)
