= Goniocloeus =

Scientific classification
- Domain: Eukaryota
- Kingdom: Animalia
- Phylum: Arthropoda
- Class: Insecta
- Order: Coleoptera
- Suborder: Polyphaga
- Infraorder: Cucujiformia
- Family: Anthribidae
- Tribe: Platyrhinini
- Genus: Goniocloeus; Jordan, 1904

Genus of beetles

Goniocloeus is a genus of fungus weevils in the beetle family Anthribidae. There are at least 40 described species in Goniocloeus.

== Species ==
These 40 species belong to the genus Goniocloeus:

- Goniocloeus acerbus Wolfrum, 1953
- Goniocloeus apicalis Jordan, 1904
- Goniocloeus armatus Jordan, 1897
- Goniocloeus baccatus Jordan, 1904
- Goniocloeus bimaculatus (Olivier, 1795)
- Goniocloeus capucinus Jordan, 1904
- Goniocloeus carbonarius Jordan, 1906
- Goniocloeus curvatus Jordan, 1906
- Goniocloeus fractus Jordan, 1906
- Goniocloeus funereus Jordan, 1906
- Goniocloeus hirsutus Jordan, 1904
- Goniocloeus icas Jordan, 1906
- Goniocloeus insignis Jordan, 1906
- Goniocloeus inversus Jordan, 1906
- Goniocloeus laticeps Jordan, 1906
- Goniocloeus linifer Jordan, 1906
- Goniocloeus marilis Jordan, 1937
- Goniocloeus melas Jordan, 1904
- Goniocloeus mexicanus Jordan, 1906
- Goniocloeus minor Jordan, 1904
- Goniocloeus morulus Jordan, 1937
- Goniocloeus nanus Jordan, 1906
- Goniocloeus niger Jordan, 1904
- Goniocloeus orbitalis Lacordaire, 1866
- Goniocloeus ornaticeps Jordan, 1906
- Goniocloeus parvulus Jordan, 1906
- Goniocloeus planipennis Kirsch, 1873
- Goniocloeus politus Jordan, 1906
- Goniocloeus pumilus Jordan, 1906
- Goniocloeus pusillus Jordan, 1906
- Goniocloeus quadrinotatus Say, 1827
- Goniocloeus rectus Wolfrum, 1938
- Goniocloeus reflexus Jordan, 1906
- Goniocloeus silvanus Jordan, 1906
- Goniocloeus spiculosus Gyllenhal, 1833
- Goniocloeus tarsalis Jordan, 1904
- Goniocloeus tholerus Jordan, 1906
- Goniocloeus triruptus Wolfrum, 1933
- Goniocloeus tuberculatus Olivier, 1795
- Goniocloeus umbrinus Jordan, 1904
