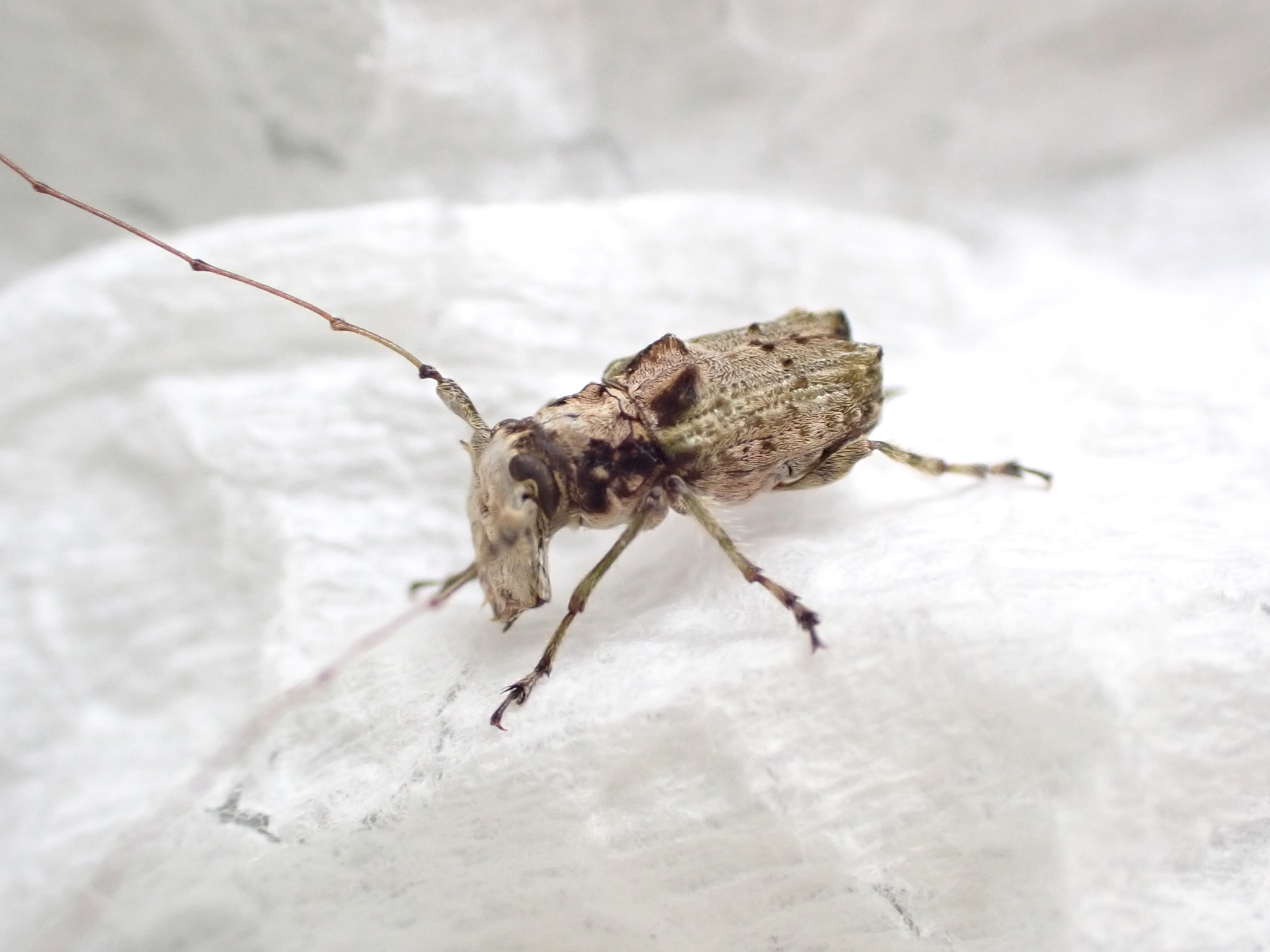
- Specimen found in Ashhurst

Scientific classification
- Domain: Eukaryota
- Kingdom: Animalia
- Phylum: Arthropoda
- Class: Insecta
- Order: Coleoptera
- Suborder: Polyphaga
- Infraorder: Cucujiformia
- Family: Anthribidae
- Genus: Hoherius
- Species: H. meinertzhageni

Binomial name
- Hoherius meinertzhageni (Broun, 1880)

= Hoherius =

Hoherius meinertzhageni

Species of insect

Hoherius meinertzhageni, the ribbonwood fungus weevil, is an endemic New Zealand beetle that has been recorded feeding on the ribbonwood species Plagianthus regius and Plagianthus divaricatus and the mountain lacebark, Hoheria glabrata.

== Taxonomy and description ==
This species was described by Thomas Broun from a specimen that was collected by F.H. Meinertzhagen, in Napier, New Zealand. This holotype specimen is stored in the Natural History Museum, London. Broun originally placed the species within the anthribid genus Araeocerus and named the species after its collector. The genus Hoherius is monotypic and named after the plant genus Hoheria due to its association with this beetles' larvae. This species is remarkable for its distinctive flat and white rostrum, which is as wide as the thorax in male specimens. The antennae are twice as long as the body. The elytra have a varied colour of brown, black and green. This species is sexually dimorphic with males conspicuously larger than females. There is further dimorphism among males, with larger males demonstrating broadened heads with longer mandibles and antennae than smaller males.

== Distribution ==
H. meinertzhageni has a widespread distribution across both the North and South Islands of New Zealand, from Auckland to Southland. It has been collected from sea level to over 1000 metres above sea level.

== Gallery ==
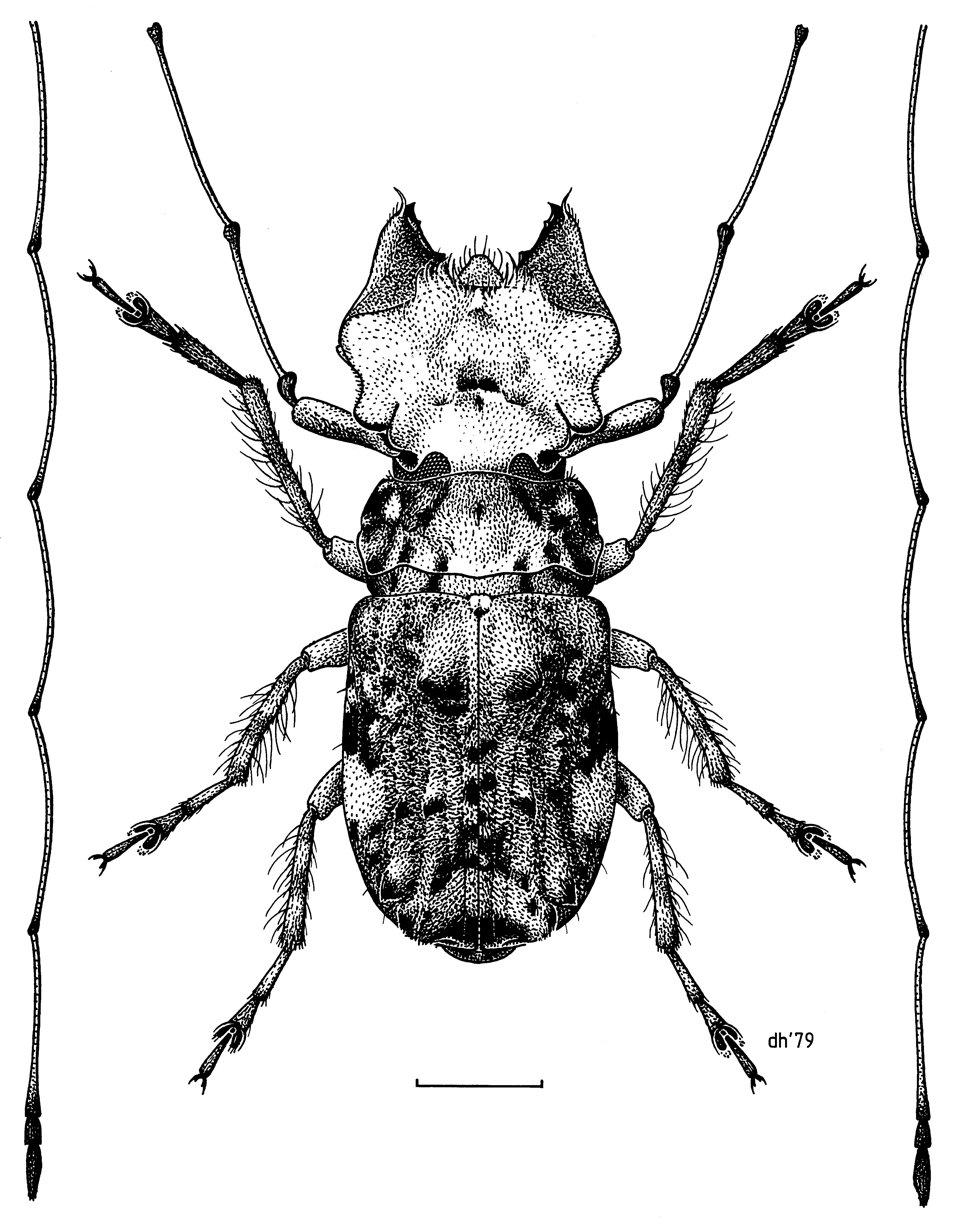
Illustration by Des Helmore.

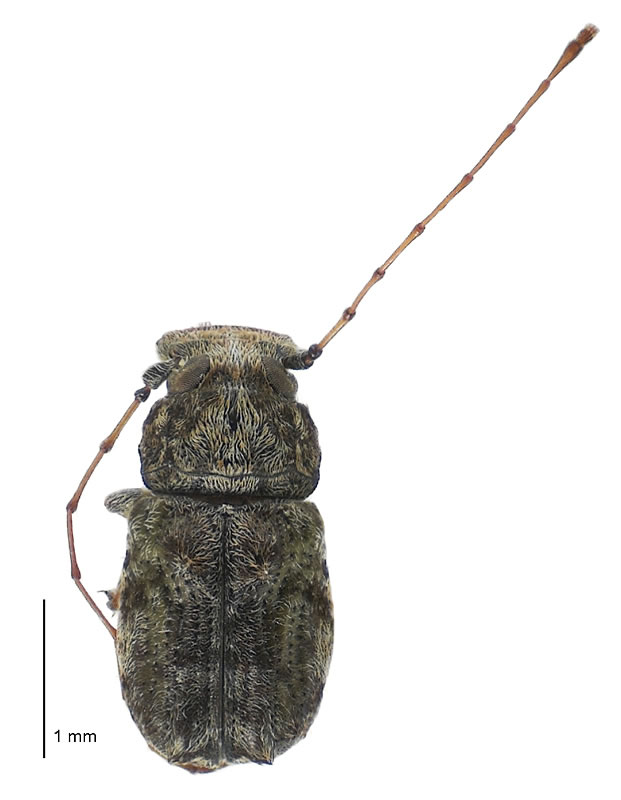
Dorsal view

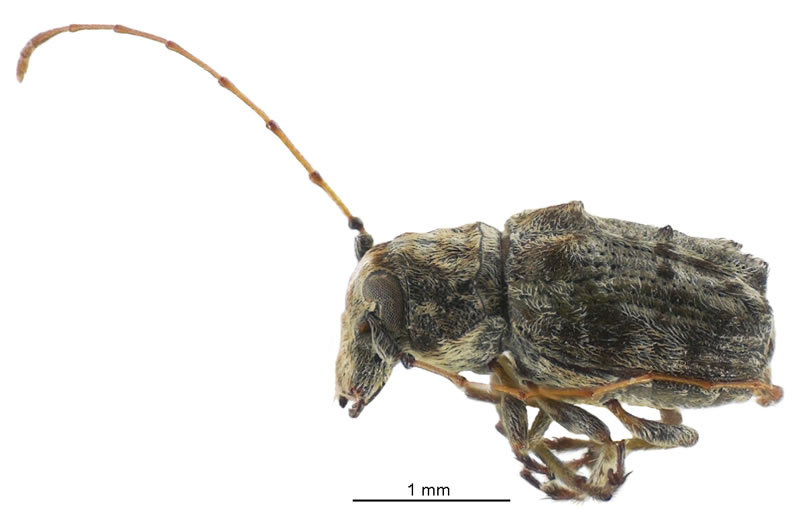
Lateral view

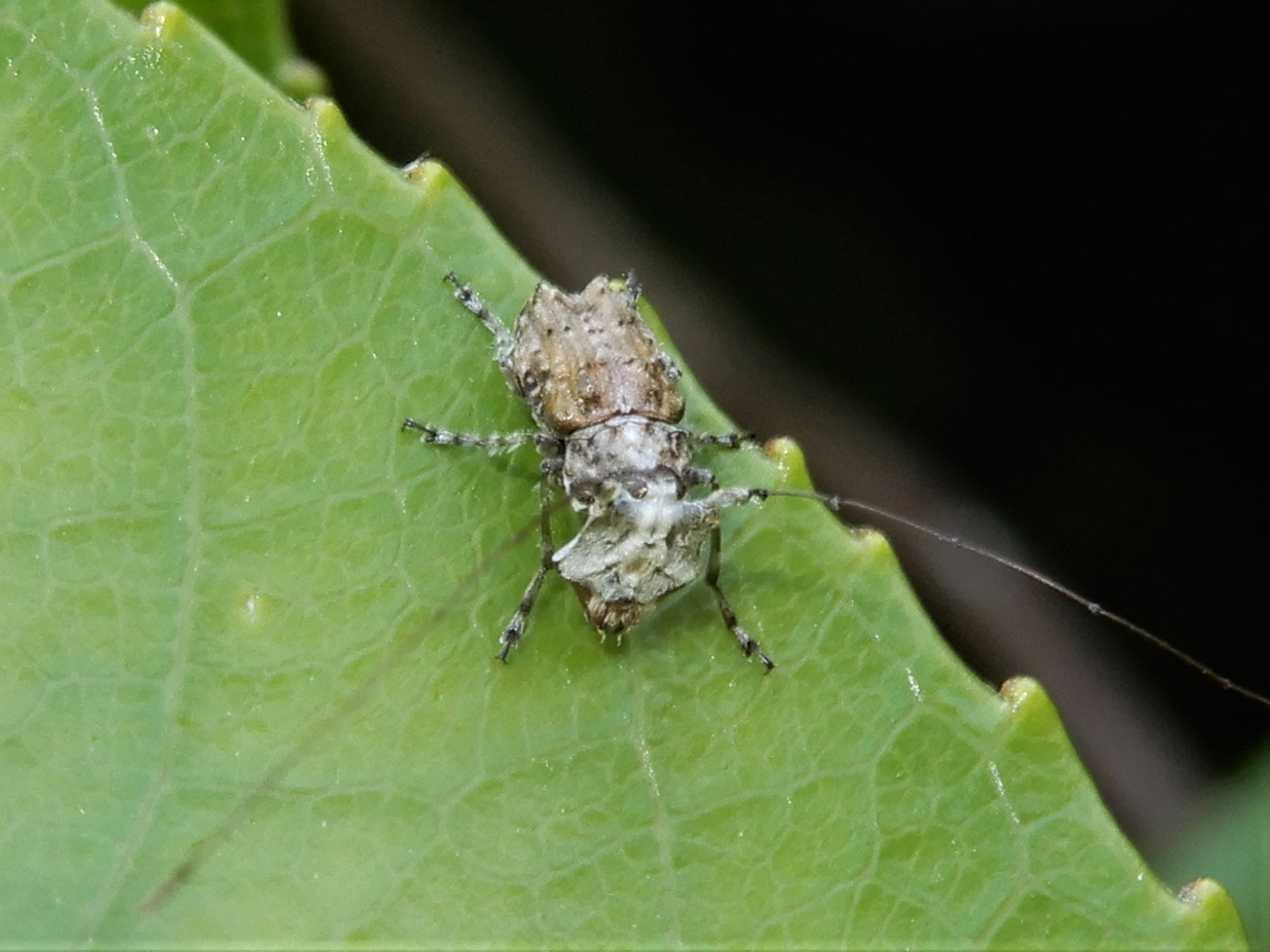
Hoherius meinertzhageni on a leaf
