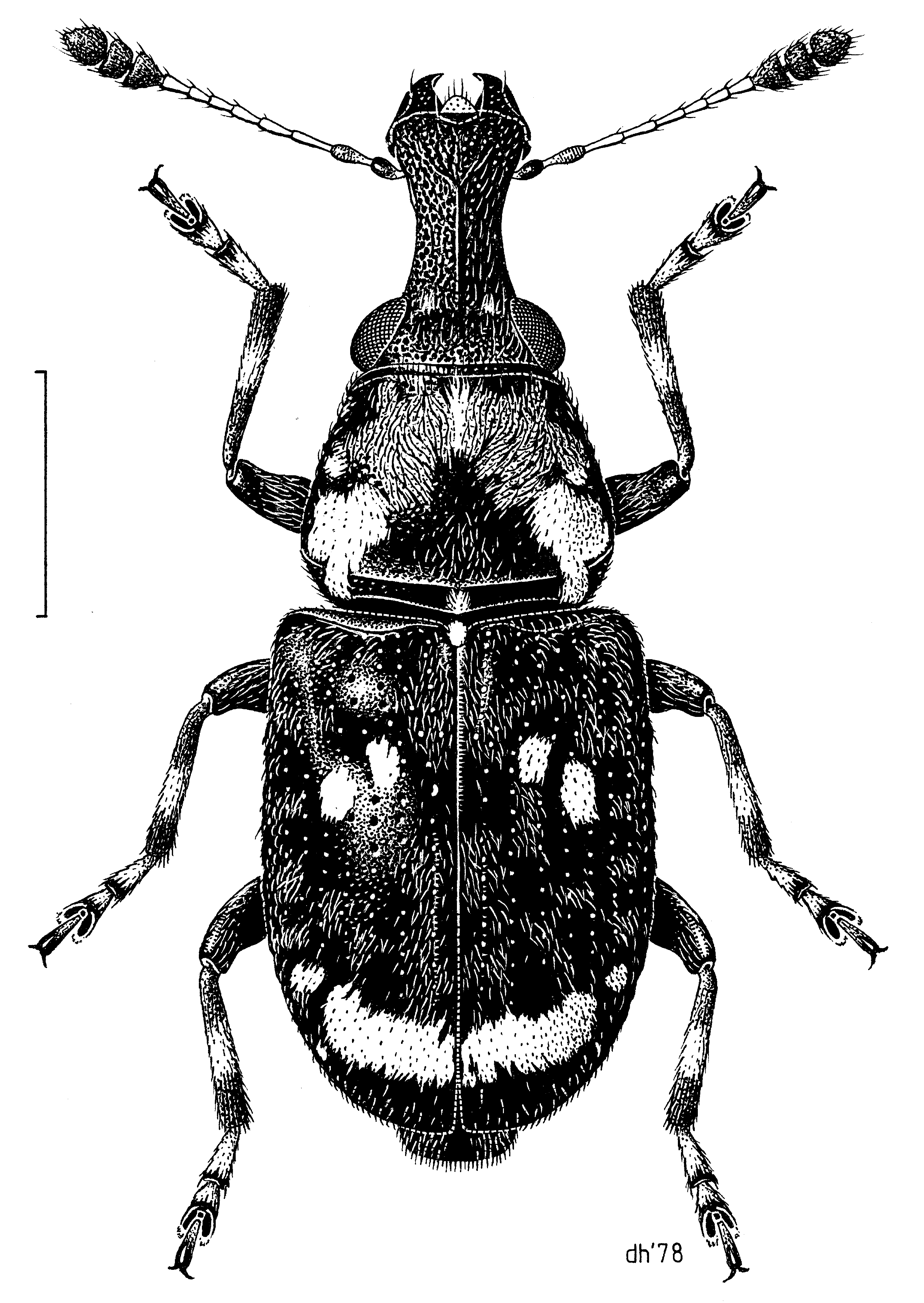
- Sharpius venustus

Scientific classification
- Kingdom: Animalia
- Phylum: Arthropoda
- Clade: Pancrustacea
- Class: Insecta
- Order: Coleoptera
- Suborder: Polyphaga
- Infraorder: Cucujiformia
- Clade: Phytophaga
- Superfamily: Curculionoidea
- Family: Anthribidae; Billberg, 1820

Subfamilies
- Anthribinae; Choraginae; †Protoscelidinae; Urodontinae

= Anthribidae =

Family of beetles

Anthribidae is a family of beetles also known as fungus weevils. They often have thread-like antennae that may occasionally be longer than the body and are usually clubbed at the end. Since the members of Anthribidae are primitive weevils, the antennae are not elbowed. The antennae can also be the longest of any members of Curculionoidea. As in the Nemonychidae, the labrum appears as a separate segment to the clypeus, and the maxillary palps are long and projecting.

Most anthribids feed upon fungi or decaying plant matter, and the larvae feed within dead wood. Some species of Choraginae feed upon seeds, a few are stored product pests, and, unusually, Anthribus feeds upon soft scale insects.

== Gallery ==
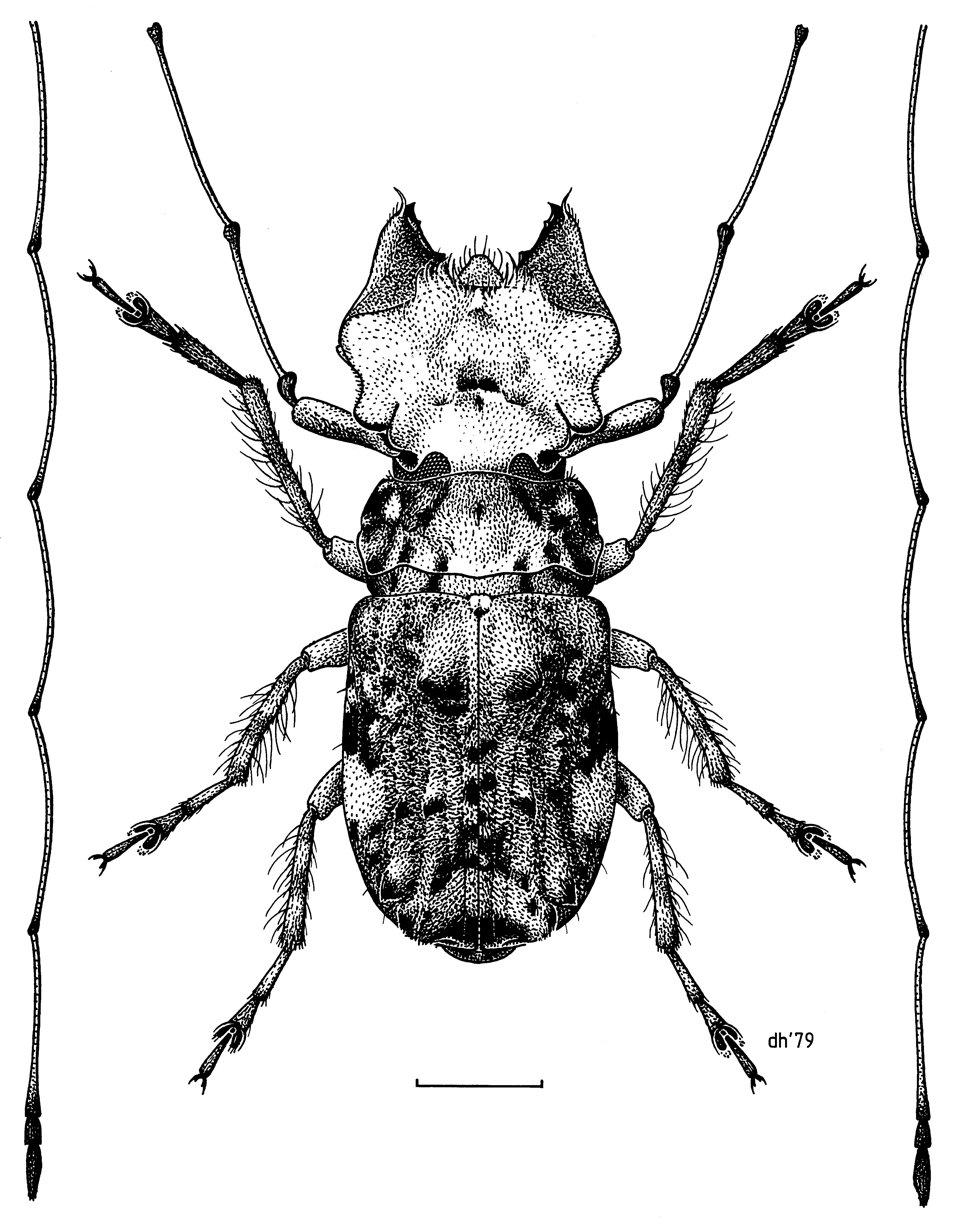
Hoherius meinertzhageni

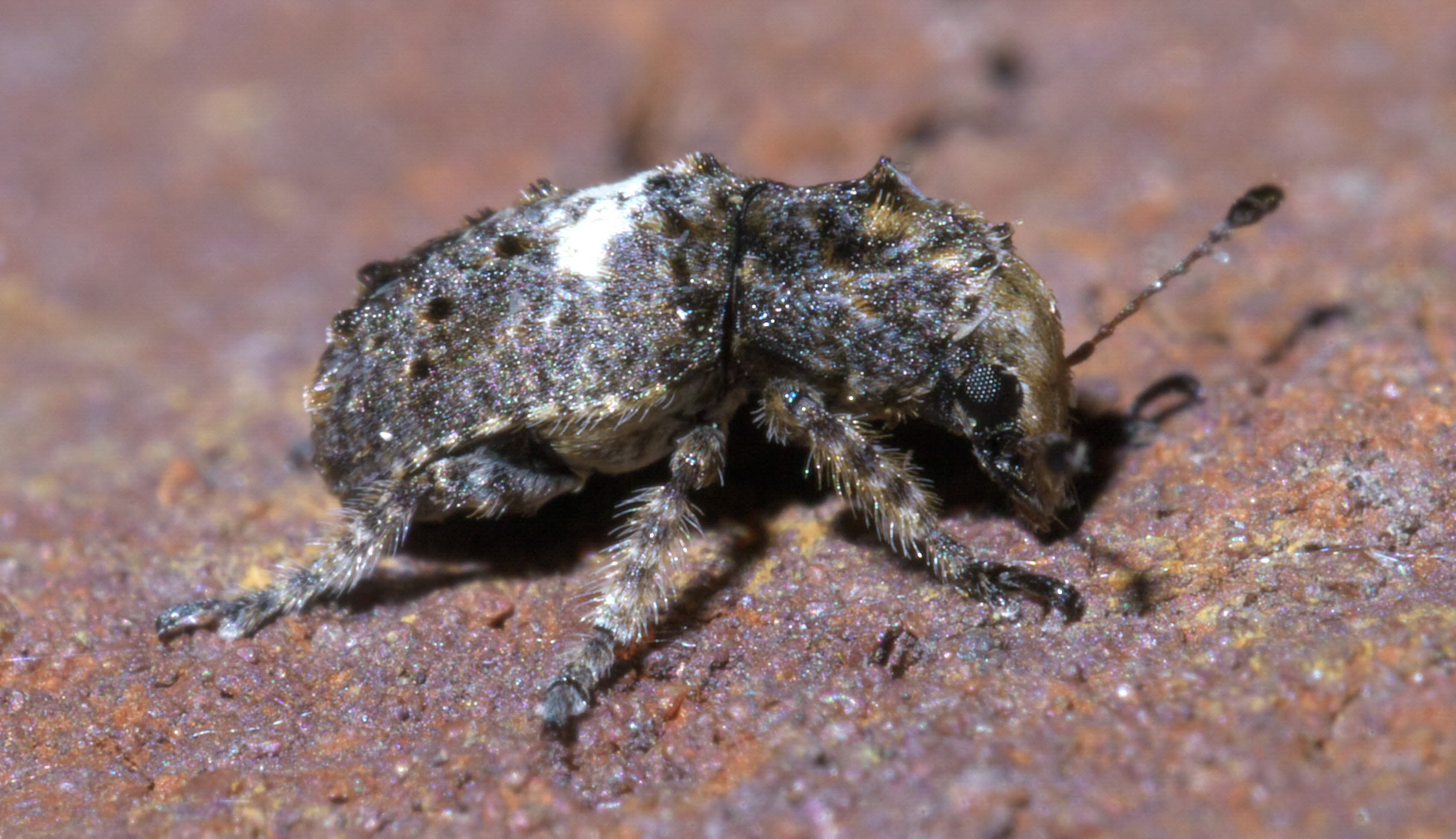
Toxonotus cornutus

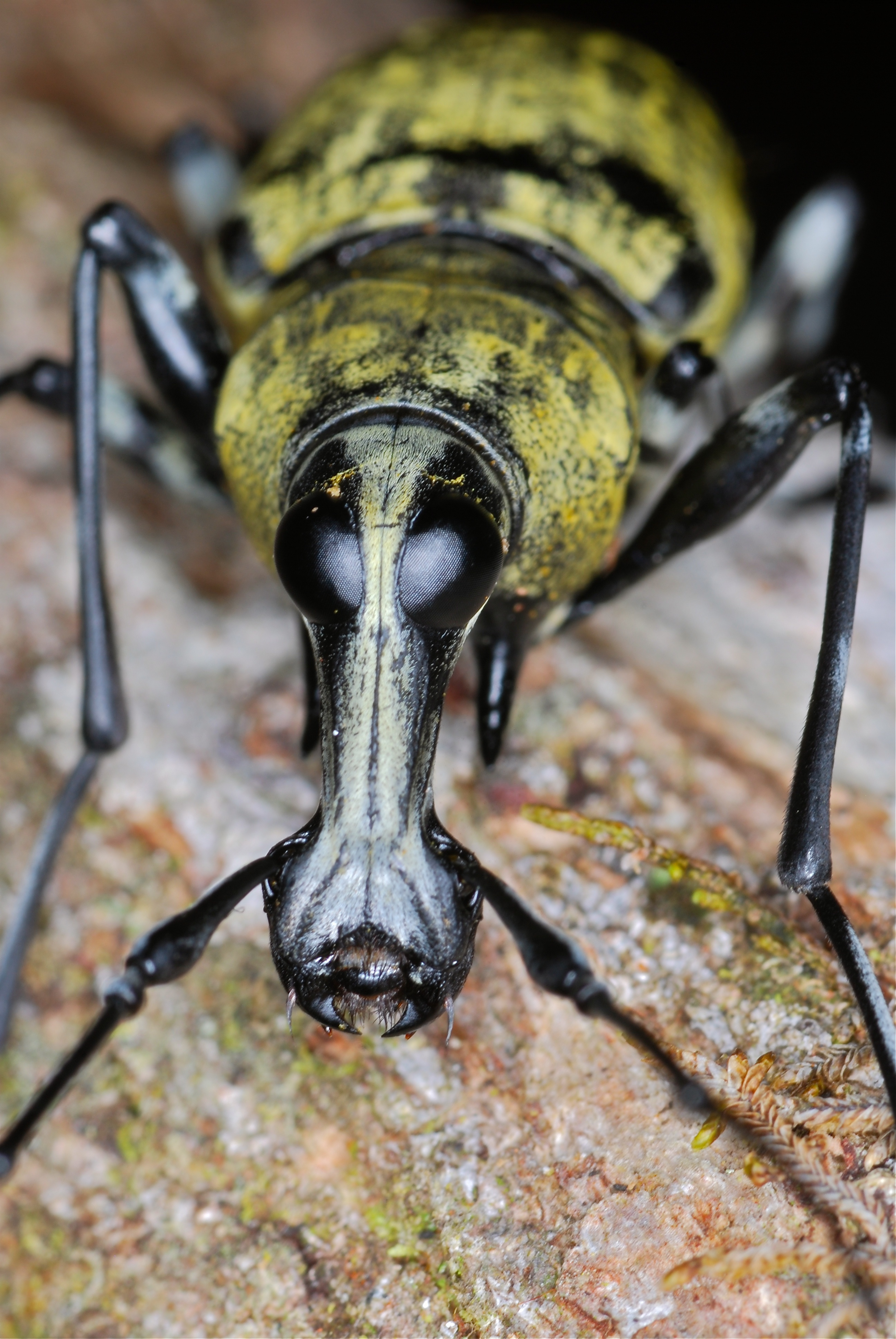
Fungus weevil

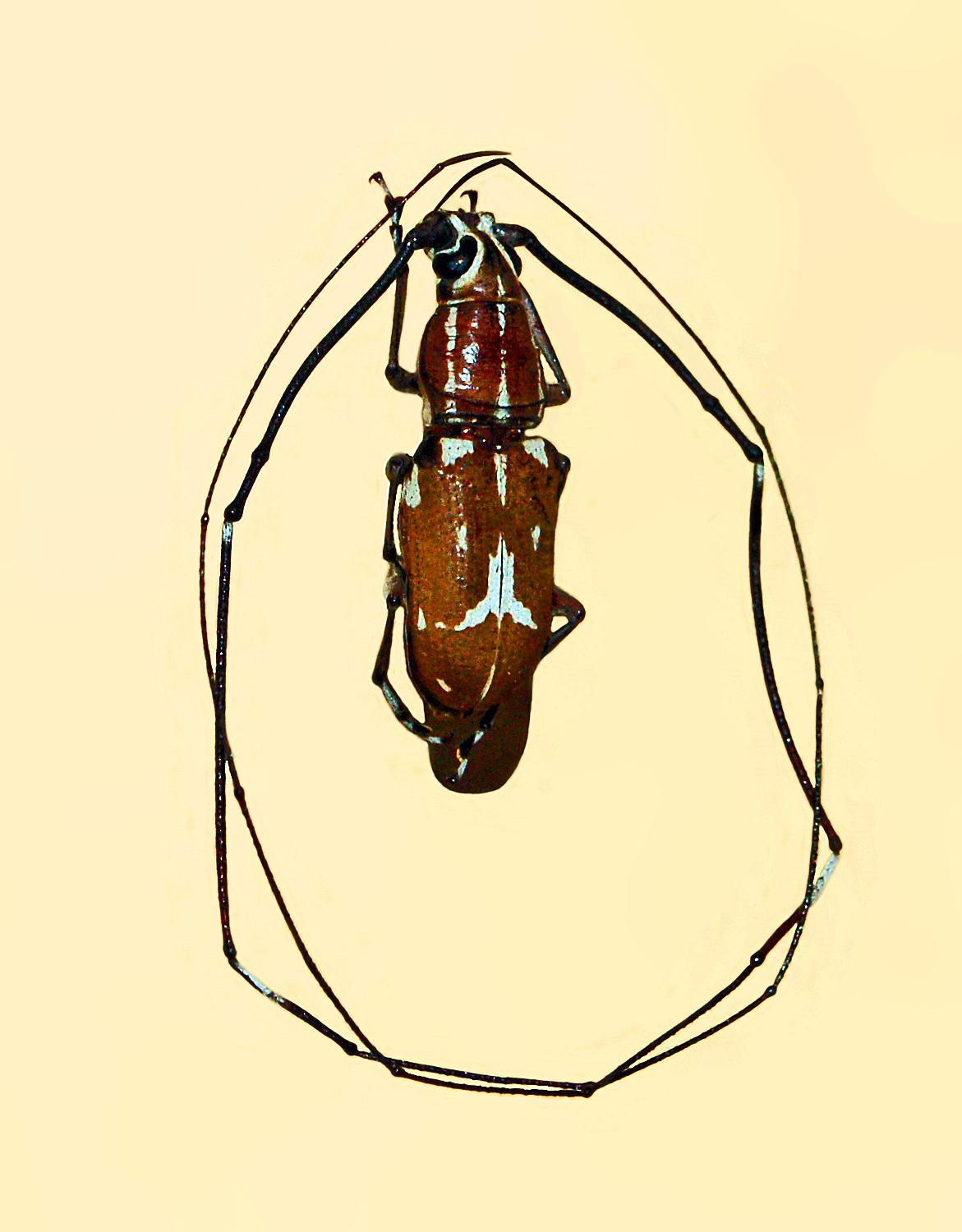
Xenocerus enganensis

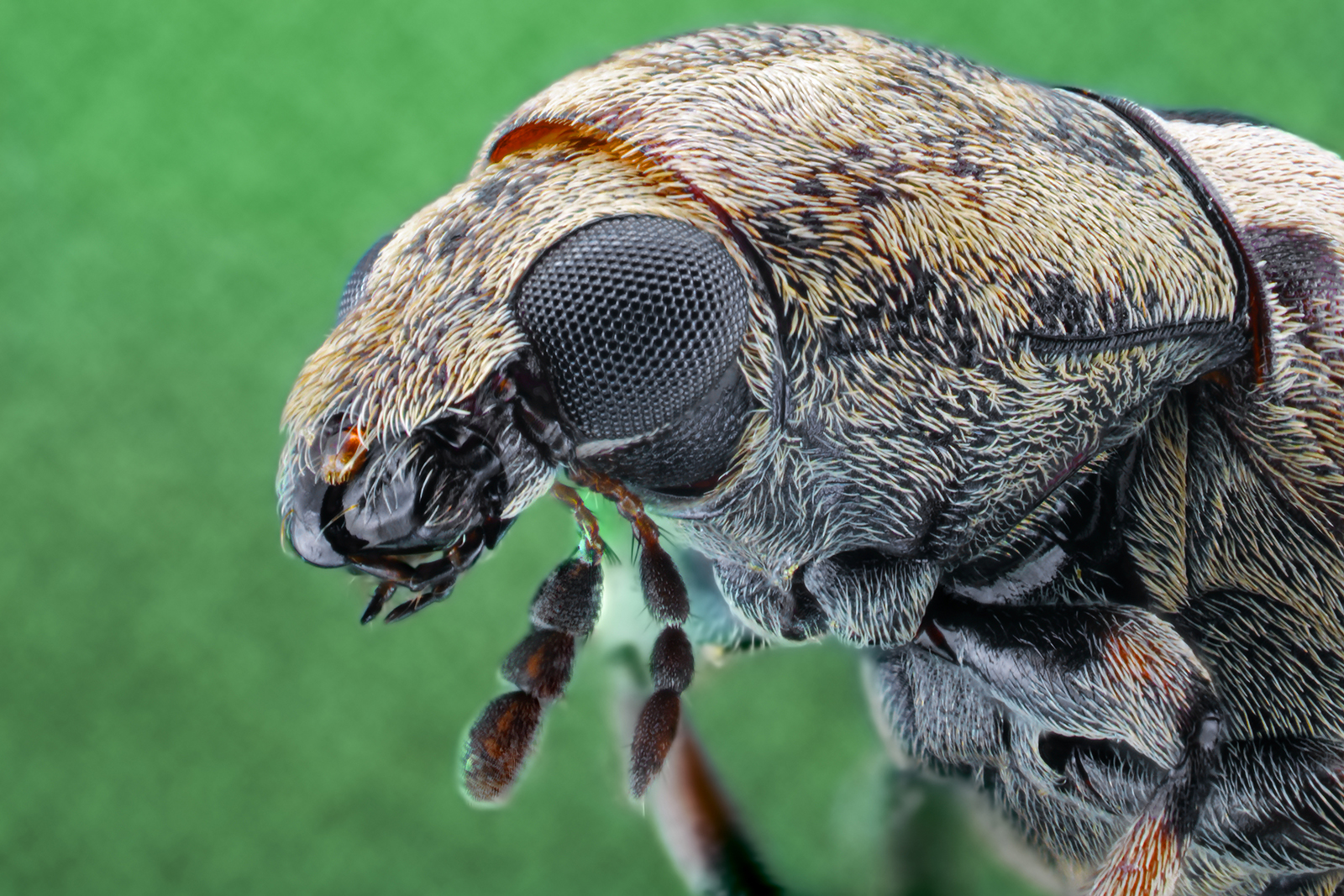
Close-up of fungus weevil (Anthribidae)

== See also ==
- List of Anthribidae genera
