= List of Chalcodermus species =

This is a list of 118 species in Chalcodermus, a genus of snout and bark beetles in the family Curculionidae.

== Chalcodermus species ==
- Chalcodermus acaciae Bondar, 1960^{c}
- Chalcodermus aeneus Boheman, 1837^{i c b} (cowpea curculio)
- Chalcodermus aeratus Fiedler, 1937^{c}
- Chalcodermus albosquamosus Fiedler, 1943^{c}
- Chalcodermus alternans Fiedler, 1937^{c}
- Chalcodermus angularis Champion, 1904^{c}
- Chalcodermus angulicollis Fåhraeus, 1837^{c}
- Chalcodermus armipes Boheman, 1837^{c}
- Chalcodermus ater Fiedler, 1937^{c}
- Chalcodermus aterrimus Fiedler, 1952^{c}
- Chalcodermus aureolus Fiedler, 1937^{c}
- Chalcodermus bicolor Fiedler, 1936^{c}
- Chalcodermus bimaculatus Fiedler, 1937^{c}
- Chalcodermus bituberculatus Fiedler, 1937^{c}
- Chalcodermus bondari Ogloblin, 1934^{c}
- Chalcodermus calidus Schoenherr, 1837^{c}
- Chalcodermus camposi Bondar, 1939^{c}
- Chalcodermus canavaliae Bondar, 1942^{c}
- Chalcodermus capichaba Bondar, 1948^{c}
- Chalcodermus castaneus Fiedler, 1937^{c}
- Chalcodermus cicatricosus Fiedler, 1937^{c}
- Chalcodermus coerulescens Fiedler, 1937^{c}
- Chalcodermus collaris Horn, 1873^{i c b} (partridge-pea weevil)
- Chalcodermus crassipes Champion, 1904^{c}
- Chalcodermus crassirostris Fiedler, 1937^{c}
- Chalcodermus cupreipes Champion, 1904^{c}
- Chalcodermus cupreofulgens Fiedler, 1952^{c}
- Chalcodermus cupreolus Fiedler, 1936^{c}
- Chalcodermus cupreus Dejean, 1835^{c}
- Chalcodermus curvifasciatus Fiedler, 1937^{c}
- Chalcodermus curvipes Champion, 1904^{c}
- Chalcodermus dentiferus Faust, 1893^{c}
- Chalcodermus dentipennis Fiedler, 1936^{c}
- Chalcodermus dentipes Champion, 1904^{c}
- Chalcodermus ebeninus Boheman, 1837^{c}
- Chalcodermus fossulatus Fiedler, 1937^{c}
- Chalcodermus foveolatus Champion, 1904^{c}
- Chalcodermus fulgens Fiedler, 1937^{c}
- Chalcodermus geniculatus Fiedler, 1937^{c}
- Chalcodermus gibbifrons Bondar, 1948^{c}
- Chalcodermus globicollis Fiedler, 1937^{c}
- Chalcodermus heteropteri Bondar, 1948^{c}
- Chalcodermus humeralis Fiedler, 1936^{c}
- Chalcodermus humeridens Faust, 1893^{c}
- Chalcodermus humerosus Fiedler, 1937^{c}
- Chalcodermus imperfectus Fiedler, 1937^{c}
- Chalcodermus inaequicollis Horn, 1873^{i c b}
- Chalcodermus insularis Chevrolat, 1880^{c}
- Chalcodermus irregularis Fiedler, 1936^{c}
- Chalcodermus kirschi Deichmüller, J.V., 1881^{c g}
- Chalcodermus lateralis Fiedler, 1937^{c}
- Chalcodermus laticollis Fiedler, 1936^{c}
- Chalcodermus lineatus Champion, 1904^{c}
- Chalcodermus longirostris Fåhraeus, 1837^{c}
- Chalcodermus lunatus Bondar, 1948^{c}
- Chalcodermus malpighiaceae Bondar, 1960^{c}
- Chalcodermus marshalli Bondar,^{c}
- Chalcodermus martini Van Dyke, 1930^{i c b}
- Chalcodermus metallescens Fiedler, 1937^{c}
- Chalcodermus metallinus (Fabricius, J.C., 1792)^{c g}
- Chalcodermus mexicanus Champion, 1904^{c}
- Chalcodermus micans Fiedler, 1937^{c}
- Chalcodermus niger Hustache, 1924^{c}
- Chalcodermus nigroaeneus Champion, 1904^{c}
- Chalcodermus nigromaculatus Fiedler, 1937^{c}
- Chalcodermus nigroruber Fiedler, 1952^{c}
- Chalcodermus nitens Fiedler, 1937^{c}
- Chalcodermus opacus Fiedler, 1937^{c}
- Chalcodermus ovalis Fiedler, 1936^{c}
- Chalcodermus ovatulus Fiedler, 1936^{c}
- Chalcodermus perforatus Chevrolat,^{c}
- Chalcodermus persimilis O'Brien in Heard, O'Brien, Forno & Burcher, 1998^{c}
- Chalcodermus piceus Fiedler, 1937^{c}
- Chalcodermus plaumanni Kuschel, 1958^{c}
- Chalcodermus plicaticollis Fåhraeus, 1837^{c}
- Chalcodermus porosipennis Fiedler, 1954^{c}
- Chalcodermus pruinosus Boheman, 1845^{c}
- Chalcodermus pseudenedrus Fiedler, 1936^{c}
- Chalcodermus pupillatus O'Brien & Wibmer, 1982^{c}
- Chalcodermus radiatus Champion, 1904^{c}
- Chalcodermus renominatus Blackwelder, 1947^{c}
- Chalcodermus rhomboidalis Fiedler, 1936^{c}
- Chalcodermus roricatus Fåhraeus, 1837^{c}
- Chalcodermus rubicundus Fiedler, 1937^{c}
- Chalcodermus rubidus Fiedler, 1937^{c}
- Chalcodermus rubricatus Hustache, 1924^{c}
- Chalcodermus rubripennis Fiedler, 1952^{c}
- Chalcodermus rubrofasciatus Fiedler, 1937^{c}
- Chalcodermus rubromaculatus Hustache, 1924^{c}
- Chalcodermus rubronotatus Fåhraeus, 1837^{c}
- Chalcodermus rubrovarius Fiedler, 1937^{c}
- Chalcodermus rugosicollis Fiedler, 1937^{c}
- Chalcodermus scrobiculatus Fiedler, 1937^{c}
- Chalcodermus sculpturatus Fiedler, 1937^{c}
- Chalcodermus segnis Fiedler, 1937^{c}
- Chalcodermus semicostatus Schaeffer, 1904^{i c b}
- Chalcodermus serjaniae Bondar, 1948^{c}
- Chalcodermus serripes Fahraeus, 1837^{i c b} (mimosa green-seed weevil)
- Chalcodermus sparsepilosus Bondar, 1948^{c}
- Chalcodermus speculifer Heller, 1906^{c}
- Chalcodermus spinifer Boheman, 1837^{c}
- Chalcodermus splendens Fiedler, 1937^{c}
- Chalcodermus splendidulus Fiedler, 1937^{c}
- Chalcodermus stigmatophylli Bondar, 1948^{c}
- Chalcodermus subaeneus Fiedler, 1937^{c}
- Chalcodermus subcostatus Fiedler, 1937^{c}
- Chalcodermus subnitens Fiedler, 1936^{c}
- Chalcodermus subrufus Fiedler, 1936^{c}
- Chalcodermus sulcatus Fiedler, 1943^{c}
- Chalcodermus tombacinus Fåhraeus, 1837^{c}
- Chalcodermus triangularis Fiedler, 1936^{c}
- Chalcodermus truncatipennis Fiedler, 1937^{c}
- Chalcodermus variolosus Champion, 1904^{c}
- Chalcodermus viridis Fiedler, 1937^{c}
- Chalcodermus vitraci Hustache, 1930^{c}
- Chalcodermus vittatus Champion, 1904^{i c b}
- Chalcodermus vochysiae Bondar, 1948^{c}
- Chalcodermus yvensi Bondar, 1942^{c}

Data sources: i = ITIS, c = Catalogue of Life, g = GBIF, b = Bugguide.net
