= Bean beetle =

Bean beetle may refer to:

- Mexican bean beetle
- Bean leaf beetle
- Callosobruchus chinensis
- Araecerus fasciculatus
- Hypothenemus hampei
- Callosobruchus maculatus
