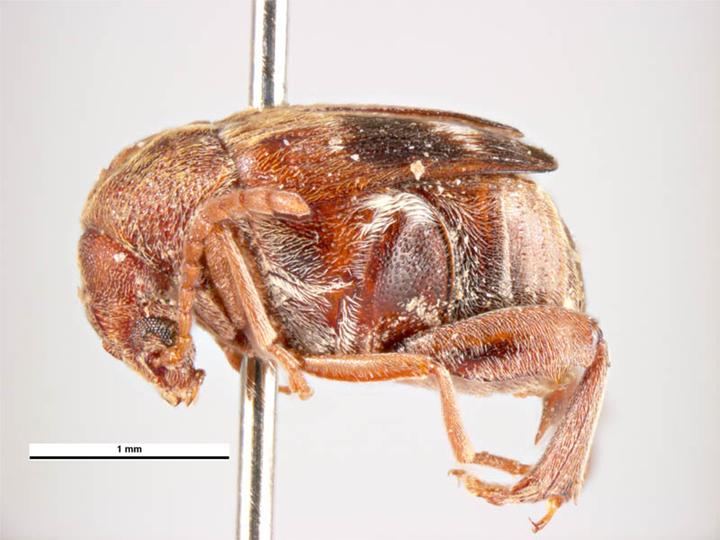

Scientific classification
- Kingdom: Animalia
- Phylum: Arthropoda
- Clade: Pancrustacea
- Class: Insecta
- Order: Coleoptera
- Suborder: Polyphaga
- Infraorder: Cucujiformia
- Family: Chrysomelidae
- Genus: Callosobruchus
- Species: C. analis

Binomial name
- Callosobruchus analis Fabricius, 1781
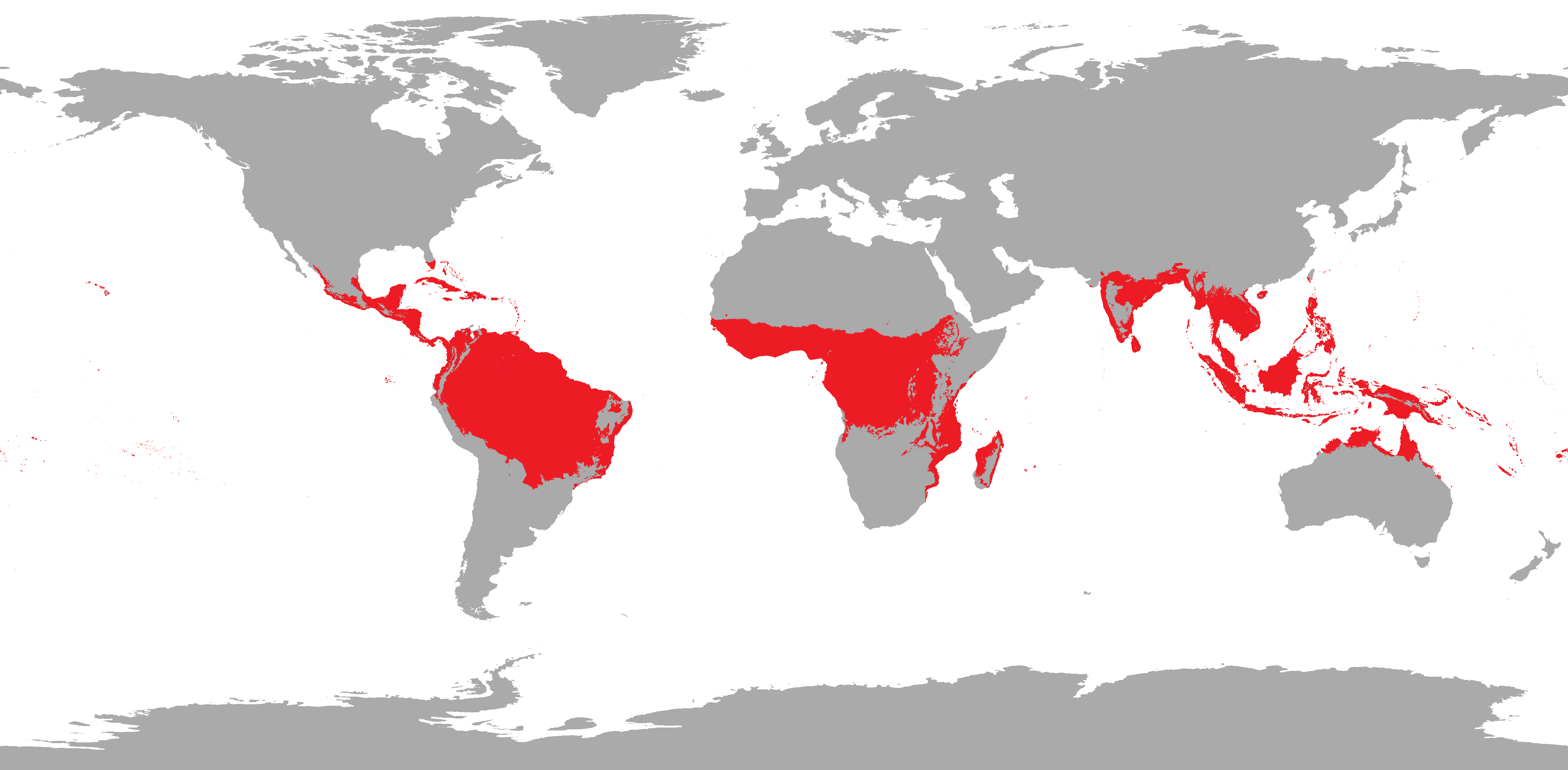
- Visual exemplar of tropical ranges native to Callosobruchus analis

= Callosobruchus analis =

Species of beetle

Callosobruchus analis, also known as the "bean weevil", "cowpea weevil" or the "seed weevil" is a species within the family Chrysomelidae (Subfamily: Bruchinae) which are leaf beetles native to tropical Asia and Africa. C. analis has also been described in locations in the Western Hemisphere such as Brazil due to international trade. Commonly mistaken for Callosobruchus maculatus, both are granivores and considered pests of stored legumes. Despite its name, C. analis not a true weevil.

== Description ==
Like other insects in the same genus, C. analis does not morphologically have an elongated rostrum which differentiates it from weevil beetles. Due to the overlapping ranges and similarities among species, insects within Callosobruchus are commonly misidentified. At maturity, the C.analis beetles can vary in length between 3-4 millimetres (mm).

== Lifecycle ==
Legumes encompass the majority of the lifecycle of C. analis either within legumes in agricultural storages or unharvested, inedible crops. To attract a male, female insects employ two pheromones to initiate reproduction: one attractant pheromone and one contact pheromone. The attractant pheromone is released to draw in male insects and once in immediate proximity, the contact pheromone is released, causing male genitalia to extrude and initiate copulation. Copulation within C. analis is conspecific, meaning breeding is restricted solely within its own species and reinforced through the chemical makeup of the contact pheromone to enhance mate recognition. Once hatched, the larvae impregnate themselves into the host bean and internally feed until maturity. Unlike C. maculatus, C. analis, displays a 'contest' competition method in which only one single adult insect will emerge from a single bean, though two adults have been observed to emerge from a single bean. A female, after having undergone copulation, will lay as many as 100 - 200 eggs on suitable legumes.

It has been researched that the sex and phenotypic traits of larvae are linked to the quality of the host bean. Larvae hatched on lentils are larger and more likely female than those growing on mung beans.

== Distribution ==
C. analis is native to equatorial tropics and sub-saharan regions of Africa and Asia. It is most common in countries where high agricultural yields edible legumes are stored, such as India, Ghana and Indonesia. Due to international trade, the insect has expanded its range, and is found on nearly every continent in the world.

== Pest control ==
Stored foods such as the common bean, cowpea beans and other legumes contribute significantly to international agricultural trade by amount to 27% and comprises 33% of human dietary need. While insects of Callosobruchus directly render legumes unviable through feeding or hosts for reproduction, the majority of legumes are also deemed inedible due to contamination of insect waste products and dead insects, which has been reported to cause 100% loss of product. Notably, countries with emphasis on storing legumes such as Ghana have seen large infestations due to the warmer climate and abundance of legumes in storage.

Recent efforts to combat mass infestations have been through the use of insect pheromones to disrupt mating patterns or to redirect the insects entirely within food product storages. Attractant pheromones have been employed that lure males out of mass storages and while contact pheromones have been used to instigate a false copulation. But due to efficiency and practical measures, phosphine fumigation remains the most common use of beetle management in storages.
