= Coffee bean beetle =

Coffee bean beetle can refer to:

- Araecerus fasciculatus (coffee bean weevil)
- Hypothenemus hampei (coffee berry borer)
