= Callosobruchus gibbicollis =

Scientific classification
- Kingdom: Animalia
- Phylum: Arthropoda
- Class: Insecta
- Order: Coleoptera
- Suborder: Polyphaga
- Infraorder: Cucujiformia
- Family: Chrysomelidae
- Genus: Callosobruchus
- Species: C. gibbicollis

Binomial name
- Callosobruchus gibbicollis Borowiec, 1984

Species of beetle

Callosobruchus gibbicollis, is a species of leaf beetle found in Sri Lanka. It was described by Lech Borowiec in 1984, and is known from a single male specimen in the collection of the Institute of Zoology of the Polish Academy of Sciences.

== Description ==
Its body is red in color.
