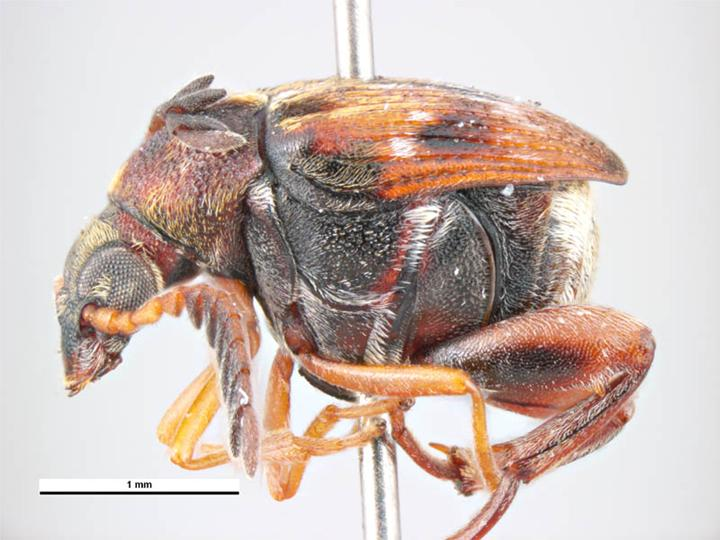
- Callosobruchus chinensis

Scientific classification
- Kingdom: Animalia
- Phylum: Arthropoda
- Class: Insecta
- Order: Coleoptera
- Suborder: Polyphaga
- Infraorder: Cucujiformia
- Family: Chrysomelidae
- Subfamily: Bruchinae
- Tribe: Bruchini
- Genus: Callosobruchus; Pic, 1902

Species
- 20+

= Callosobruchus =

Genus of beetles

Callosobruchus is a genus of beetles in the family Chrysomelidae, the leaf beetles. It is in the subfamily Bruchinae, the bean weevils. Many beetles in the genus are well known as economically important pests that infest stored foodstuffs.

== Biology ==
These beetles specialize on legumes of the tribe Phaseoleae, which includes many types of beans used for food. Host plants include mung bean (Vigna radiata), adzuki bean (V. angularis), rice bean (V. umbellata), cowpea (Vigna unguiculata), Bambara groundnut (V. subterranea), pigeon pea (Cajanus cajan), lablab (Lablab purpureus), and common bean (Phaseolus vulgaris). They can also be found in peas, lentils, chickpeas, and peanuts.

Most species in the genus are native to Asia. They can be found in warm regions in the Old World. They occur in places outside of their native range as introduced species. At least 11 species of legumes are natural hosts for these beetles, including wild and domesticated plants. Some are considered pests because they invade stores of legume foods, such as beans and lentils. They lay eggs on the seeds and the larvae consume them as they develop. They emerge from the seeds as adults. C. maculatus in particular is well adapted to living in dry beans and seeds because it does not require food or water to reproduce. It can invade a store of chickpeas and infest 100% of the seeds.

C. maculatus has also been studied in the field of reproductive biology because of the sexual conflict that occurs between mating male and female. The genitalia of the male is covered in hard spines that injure the female during copulation, and the female has a habit of kicking the male during the process.

== Species ==
There are at least 20 species in genus Callosobruchus.

Species include:

- Callosobruchus analis
- Callosobruchus chinensis
- Callosobruchus dolichosi
- Callosobruchus imitator
- Callosobruchus latealbus
- Callosobruchus maculatus
- Callosobruchus nigripennis
- Callosobruchus phaseoli
- Callosobruchus pulcher
- Callosobruchus rhodesianus
- Callosobruchus semigriseus
- Callosobruchus subinnotatus
- Callosobruchus theobromae
- Callosobruchus utidai

== Gallery ==
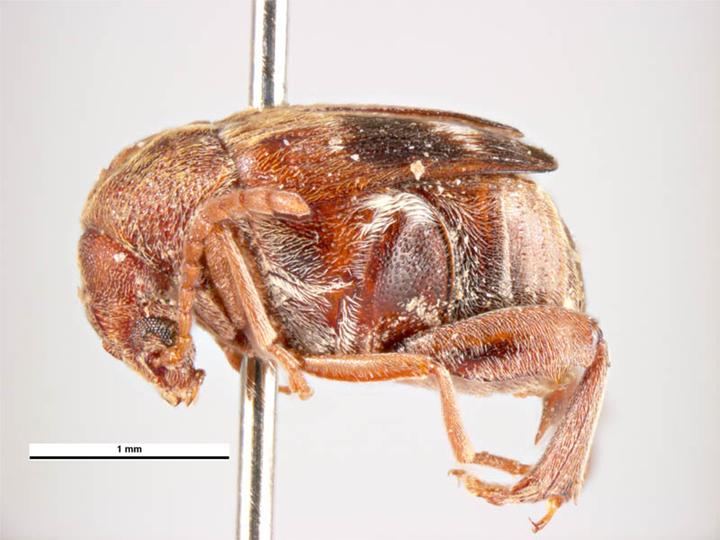
Callosobruchus analis

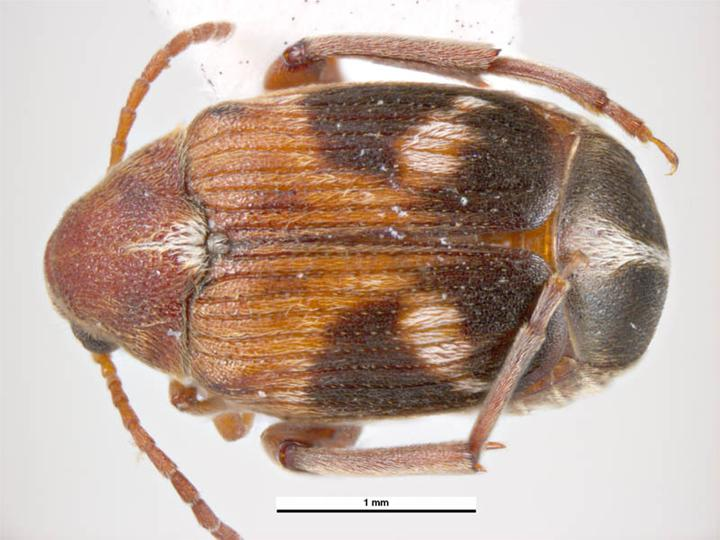
Callosobruchus maculatus

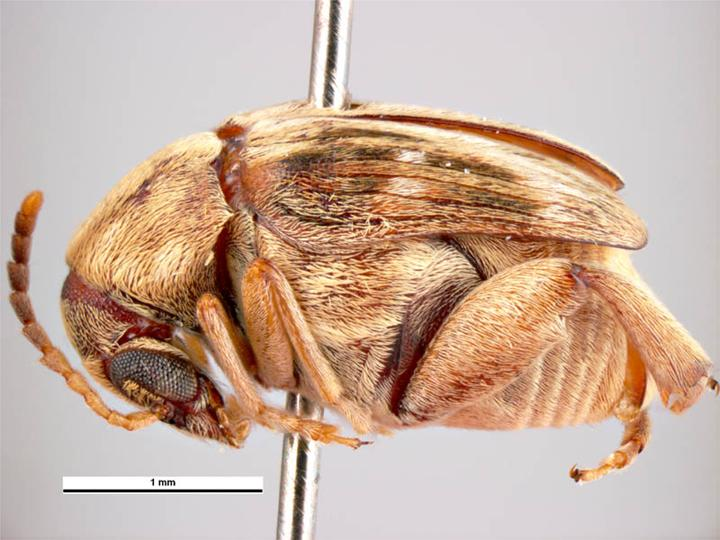
Callosobruchus phaseoli

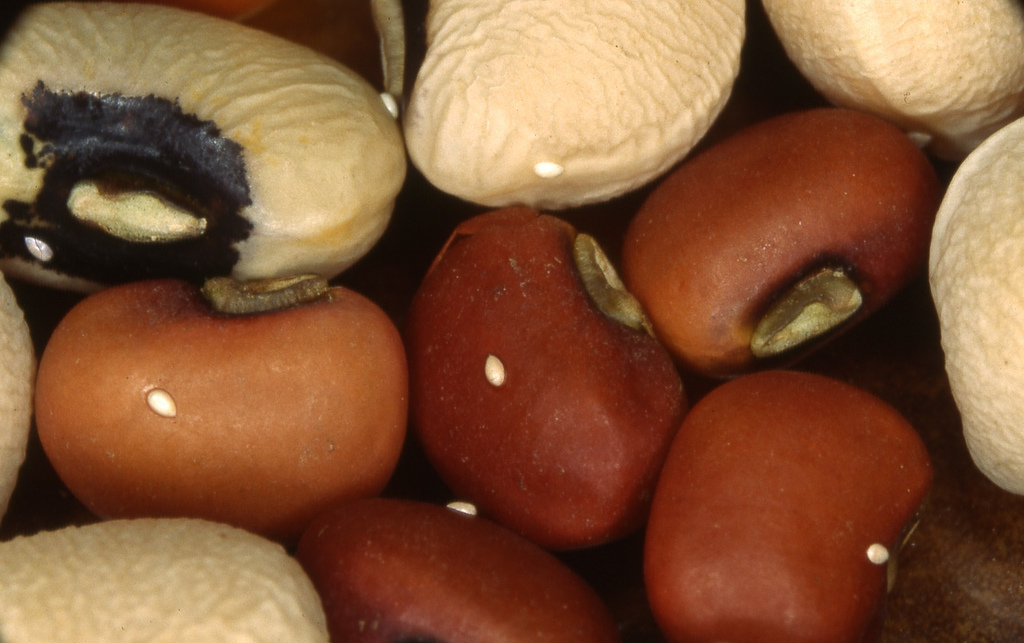
Callosobruchus eggs on beans
