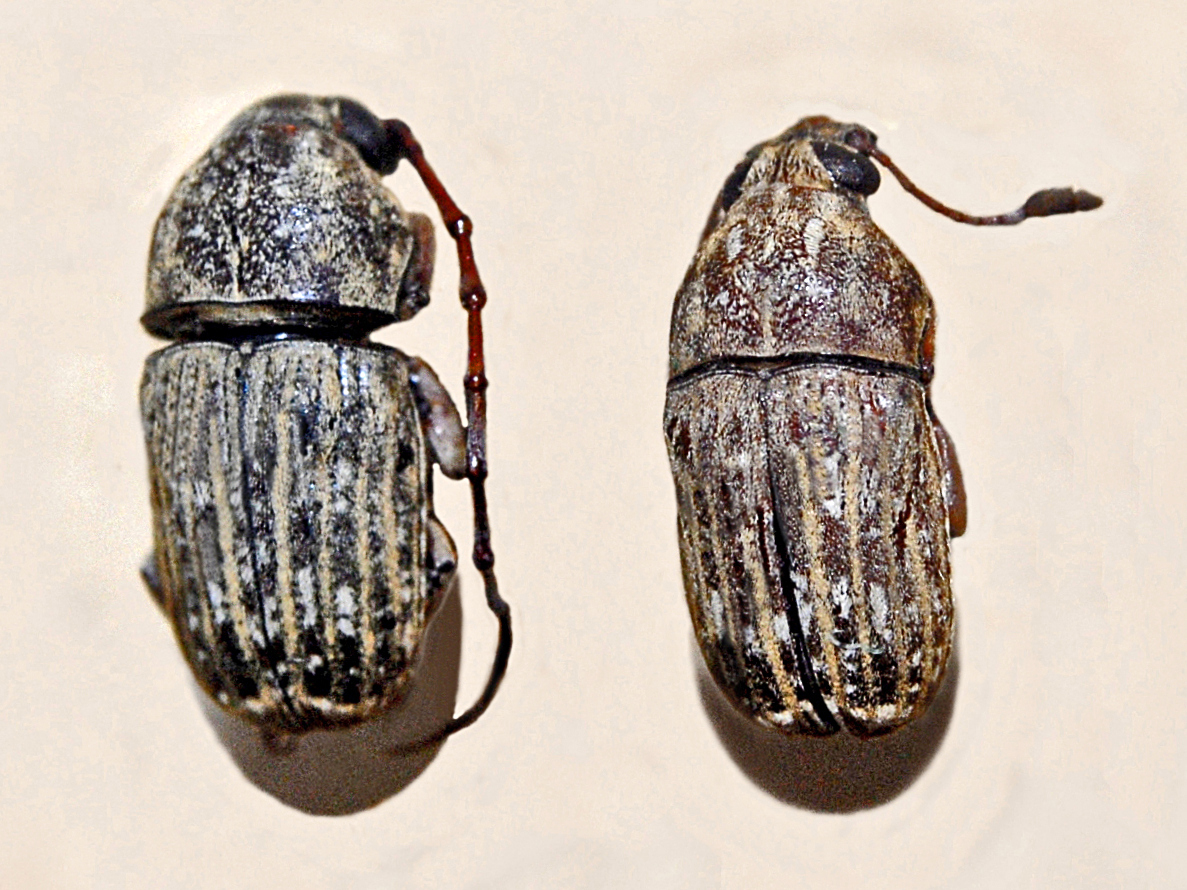
- Araecerus fasciculatus

Scientific classification
- Domain: Eukaryota
- Kingdom: Animalia
- Phylum: Arthropoda
- Class: Insecta
- Order: Coleoptera
- Suborder: Polyphaga
- Infraorder: Cucujiformia
- Family: Anthribidae
- Genus: Araecerus; Schoenherr, 1823

= Araecerus =

Genus of beetles

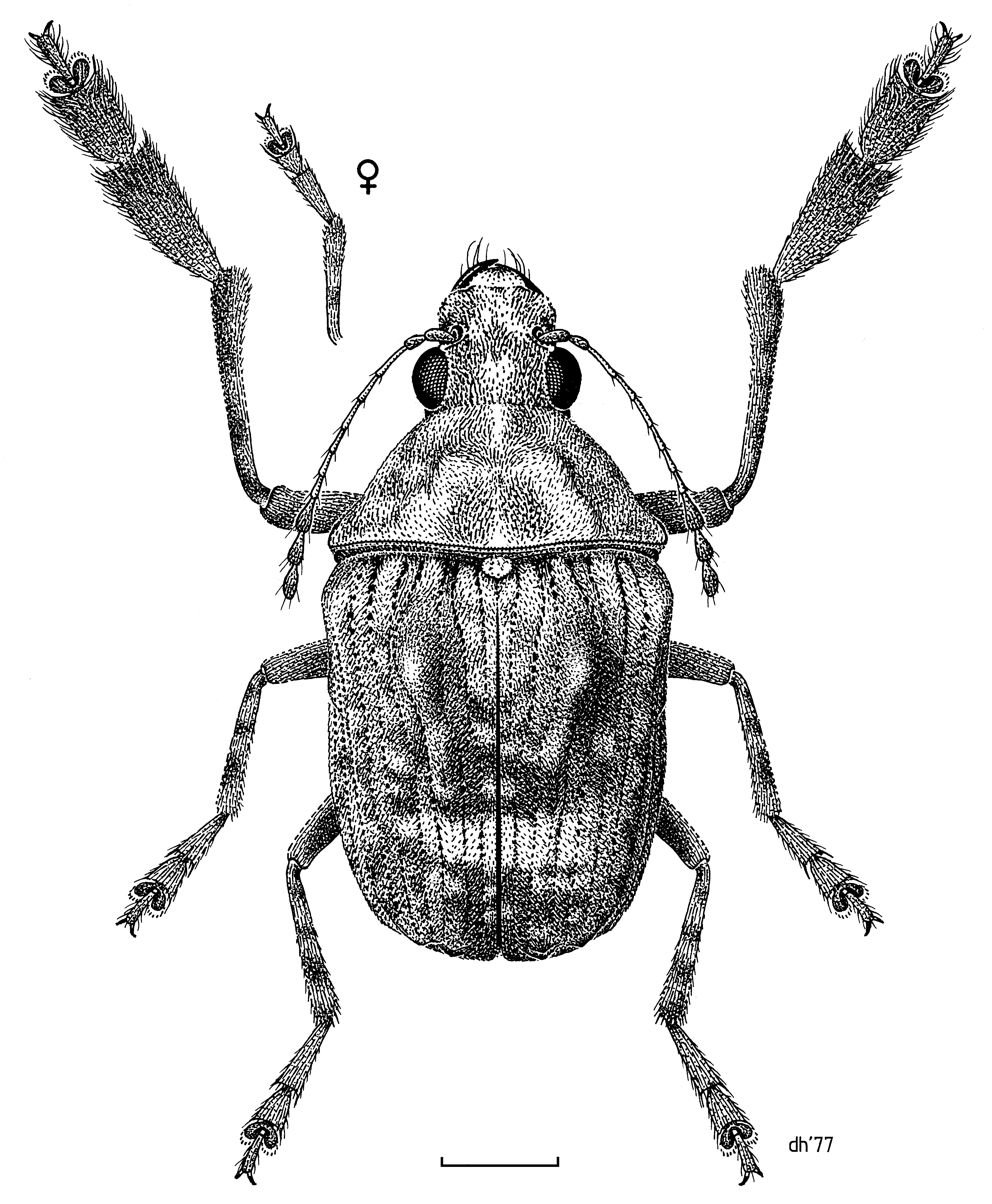
Araecerus palmaris male

Araecerus is a genus of beetles belonging to the family Anthribidae.

== Species ==
- A. coffeae (Fabricius, 1801)(now considered a junior synonym of A. fasciculatus)
- A. constans Perkins, 1900
- A. cumingi (Jekel, 1855)
- A. fasciculatus (De Geer, 1775)
- A. levipennis Jordan, 1924
- A. varians Jordan, 1946
- A. vieillardi (Montrouzier, 1860)

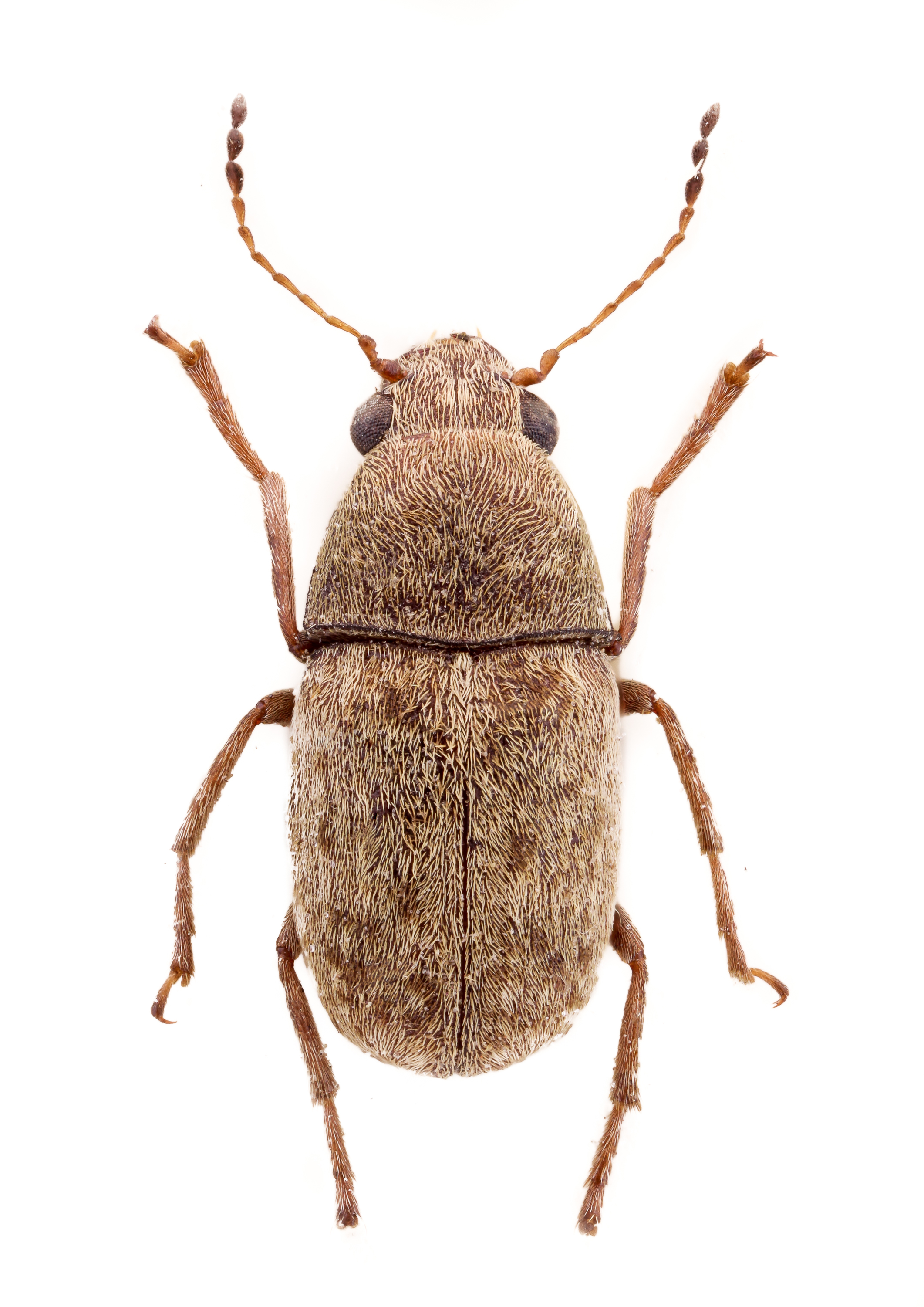
Araecerus coffeae
