= Dan wake =

Popular Hausa Staple

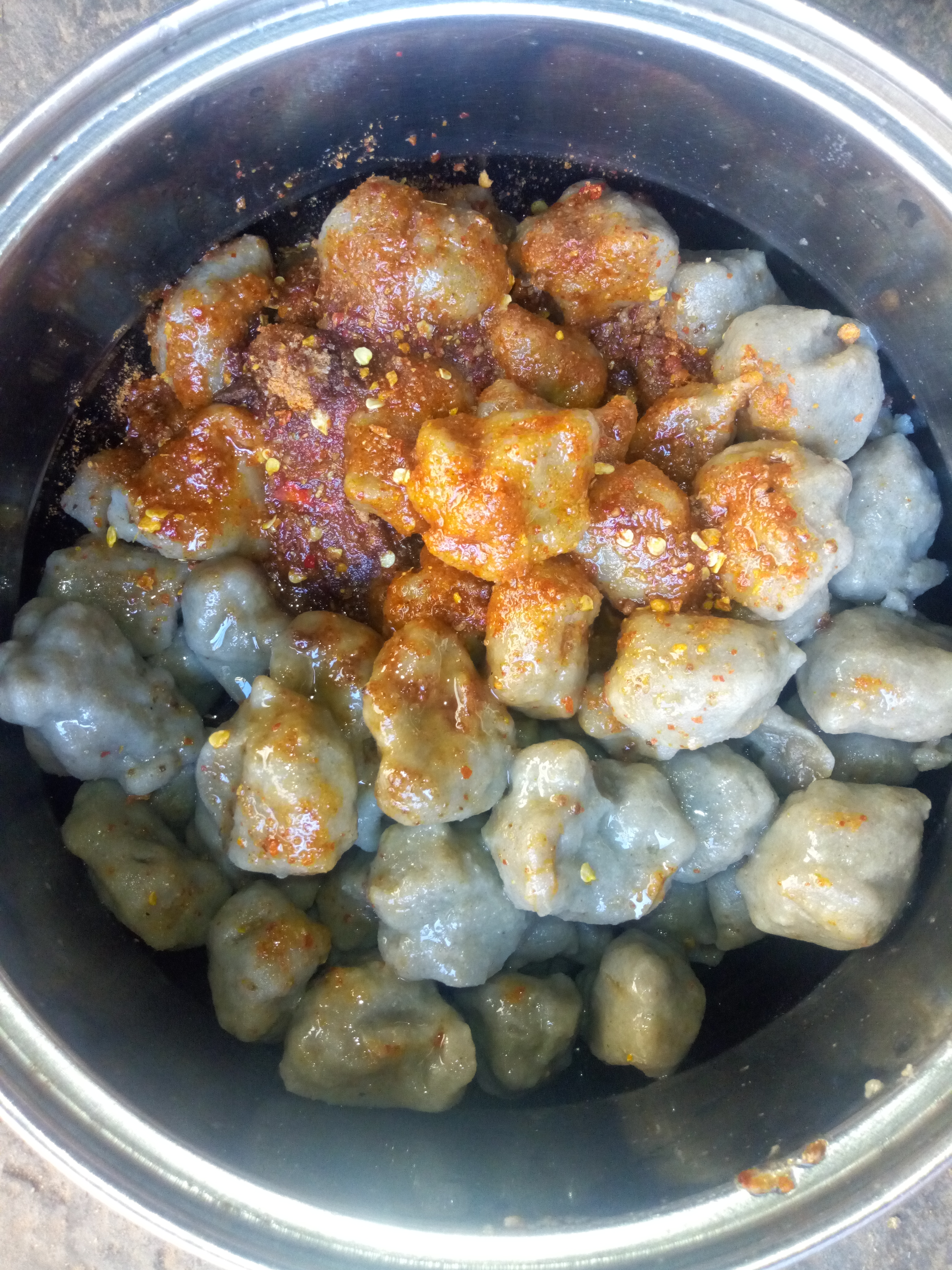

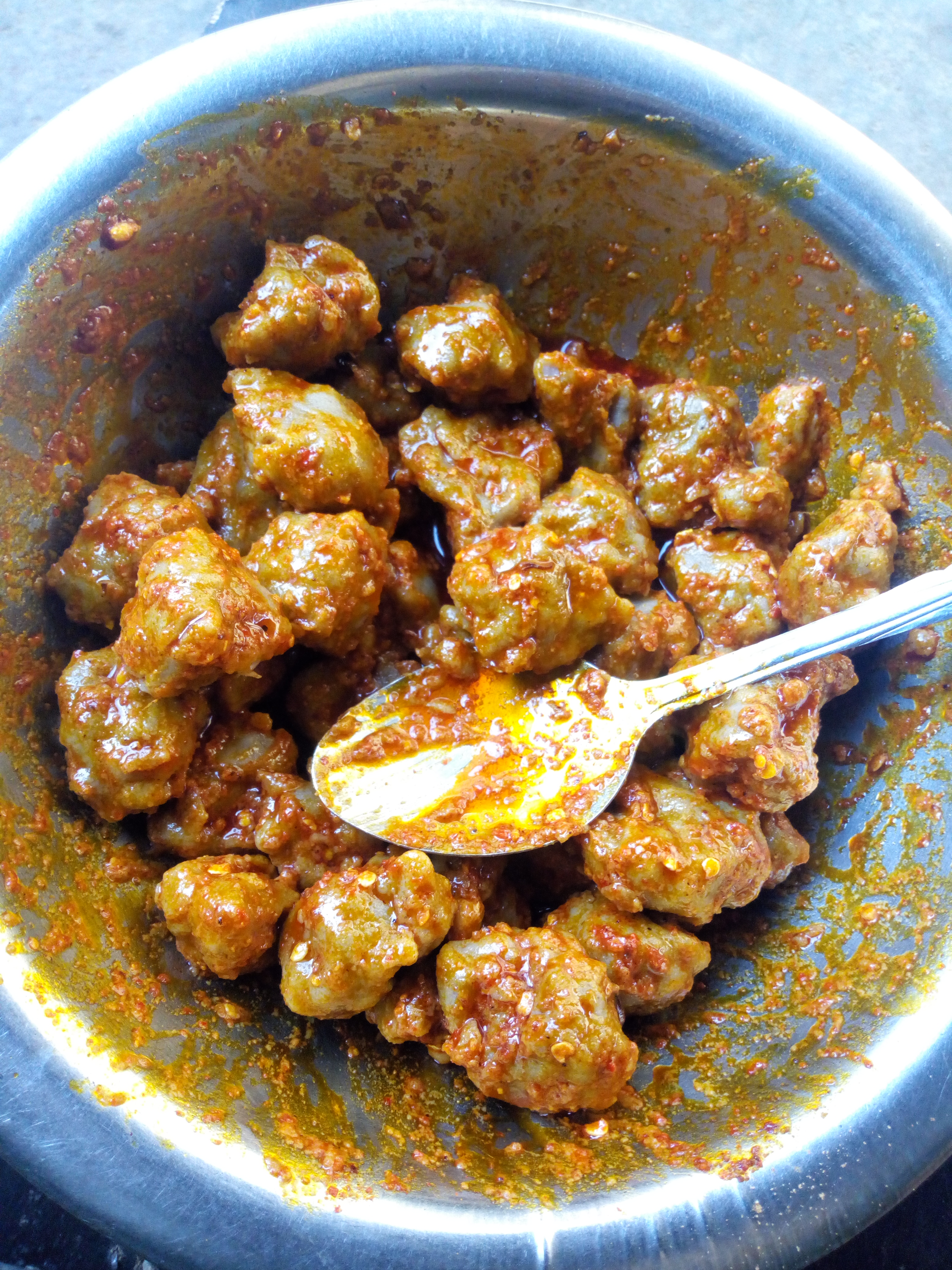

Danwake (dahn WAH-kay), also known as bean dumpling, is a dish of boiled cowpea flour dumplings from the northern part of Nigeria. It has little flavor of its own, and is usually garnished with sauce, egg, vegetables, or chili pepper.

== Origin ==
Dan wake originated in Niger, and has since spread to the Hausa-speaking area of northern Nigeria.

== Overview ==
Danwake is prepared by mixing ground cowpeas or wheat flour, kuka (baobab leaves powder), and potash with water to form a thick paste, which is formed into dumplings and boiled. The dumplings are typically garnished with fried vegetables, oil, seasonings, boiled eggs, yaji (which is a blend of different spices including cayenne pepper), or suya pepper.

== See also ==
- Hausa cuisine
