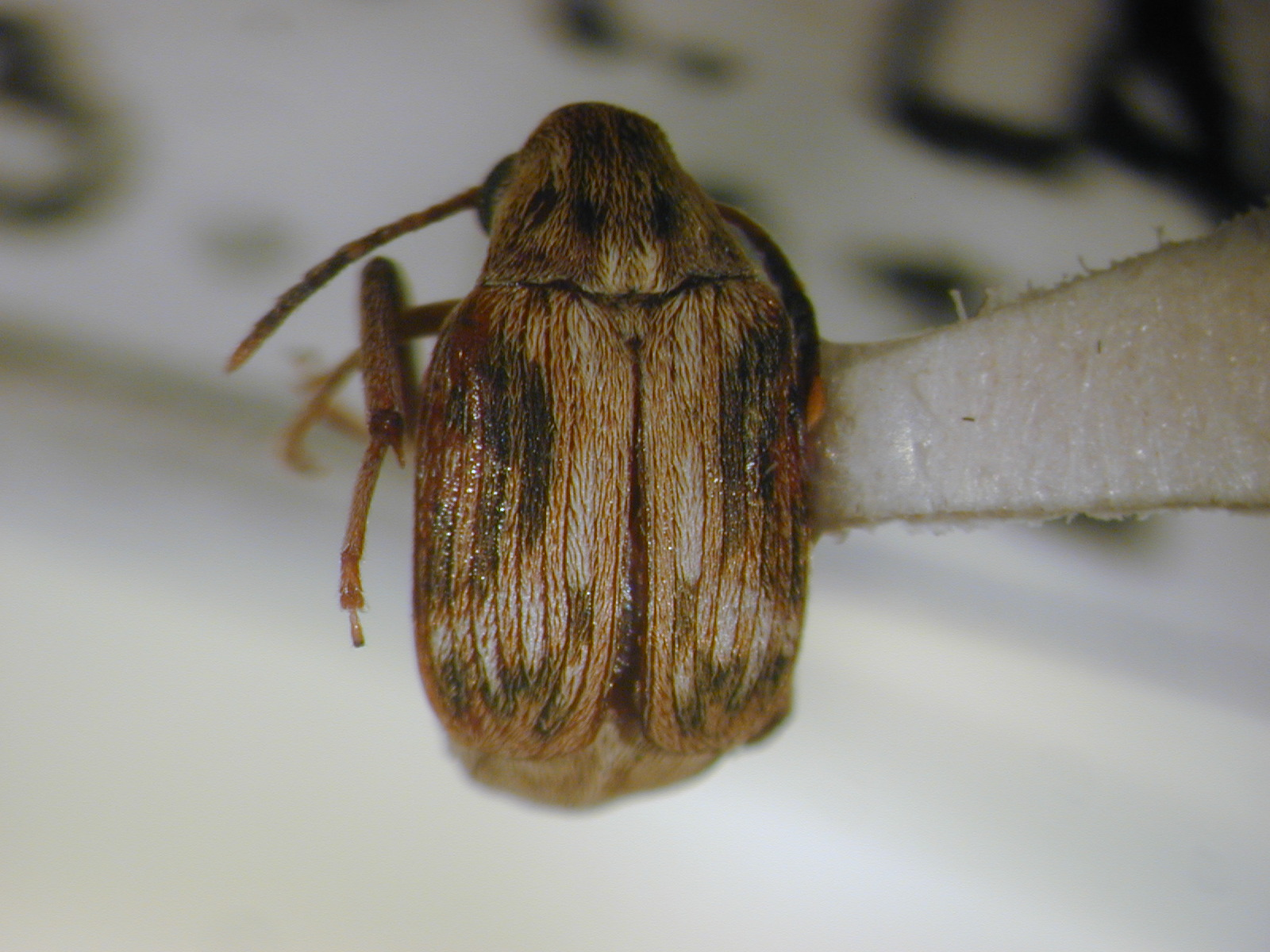

Scientific classification
- Kingdom: Animalia
- Phylum: Arthropoda
- Class: Insecta
- Order: Coleoptera
- Suborder: Polyphaga
- Infraorder: Cucujiformia
- Family: Chrysomelidae
- Genus: Callosobruchus
- Species: C. phaseoli

Binomial name
- Callosobruchus phaseoli (Gyllenhaal, 1833)

= Callosobruchus phaseoli =

Species of beetle

Callosobruchus phaseoli is a species of leaf beetle in the family Chrysomelidae. It is found in North America, Oceania, and South America.
