= Chalcodermus martini =

Scientific classification
- Domain: Eukaryota
- Kingdom: Animalia
- Phylum: Arthropoda
- Class: Insecta
- Order: Coleoptera
- Suborder: Polyphaga
- Infraorder: Cucujiformia
- Family: Curculionidae
- Genus: Chalcodermus
- Species: C. martini

Binomial name
- Chalcodermus martini Van Dyke, 1930

Species of beetle

Chalcodermus martini is a species of true weevil in the beetle family Curculionidae. It is found in North America.
