= Chalcodermus collaris =

Partridge-pea weevil

Scientific classification
- Kingdom: Animalia
- Phylum: Arthropoda
- Clade: Pancrustacea
- Class: Insecta
- Order: Coleoptera
- Suborder: Polyphaga
- Infraorder: Cucujiformia
- Family: Curculionidae
- Genus: Chalcodermus
- Species: C. collaris

Binomial name
- Chalcodermus collaris Horn, 1873

Species of beetle

Chalcodermus collaris, the partridge-pea weevil, is a species of snout or bark beetle in the family Curculionidae. It is found in North America.
