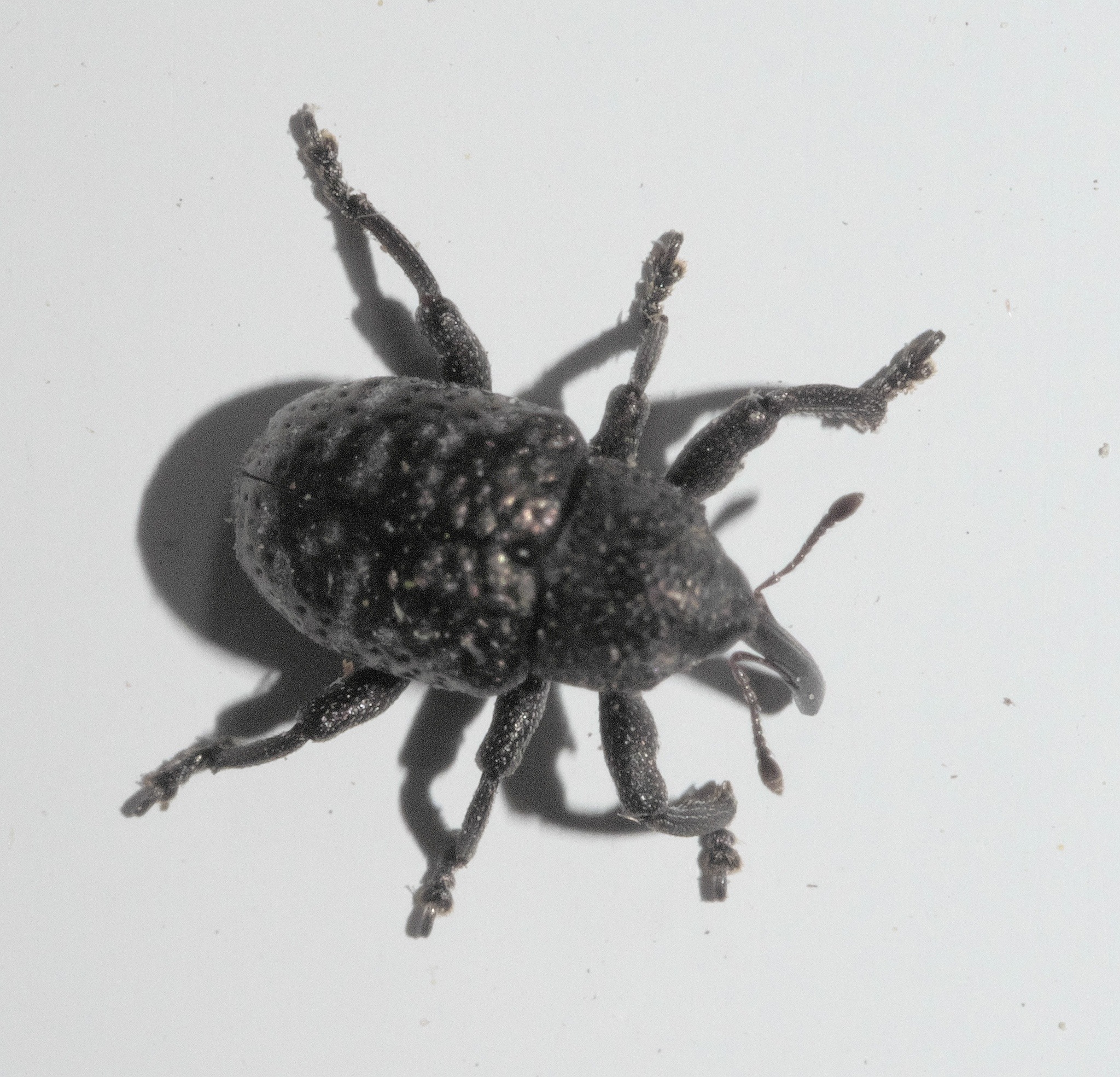
- Chalcodermus aeneus, Oklahoma

Scientific classification
- Kingdom: Animalia
- Phylum: Arthropoda
- Class: Insecta
- Order: Coleoptera
- Suborder: Polyphaga
- Infraorder: Cucujiformia
- Family: Curculionidae
- Genus: Chalcodermus
- Species: C. aeneus

Binomial name
- Chalcodermus aeneus Boheman, 1837

= Chalcodermus aeneus =

Species of beetle

Chalcodermus aeneus, the cowpea curculio, is a species of true weevil in the beetle family Curculionidae.
