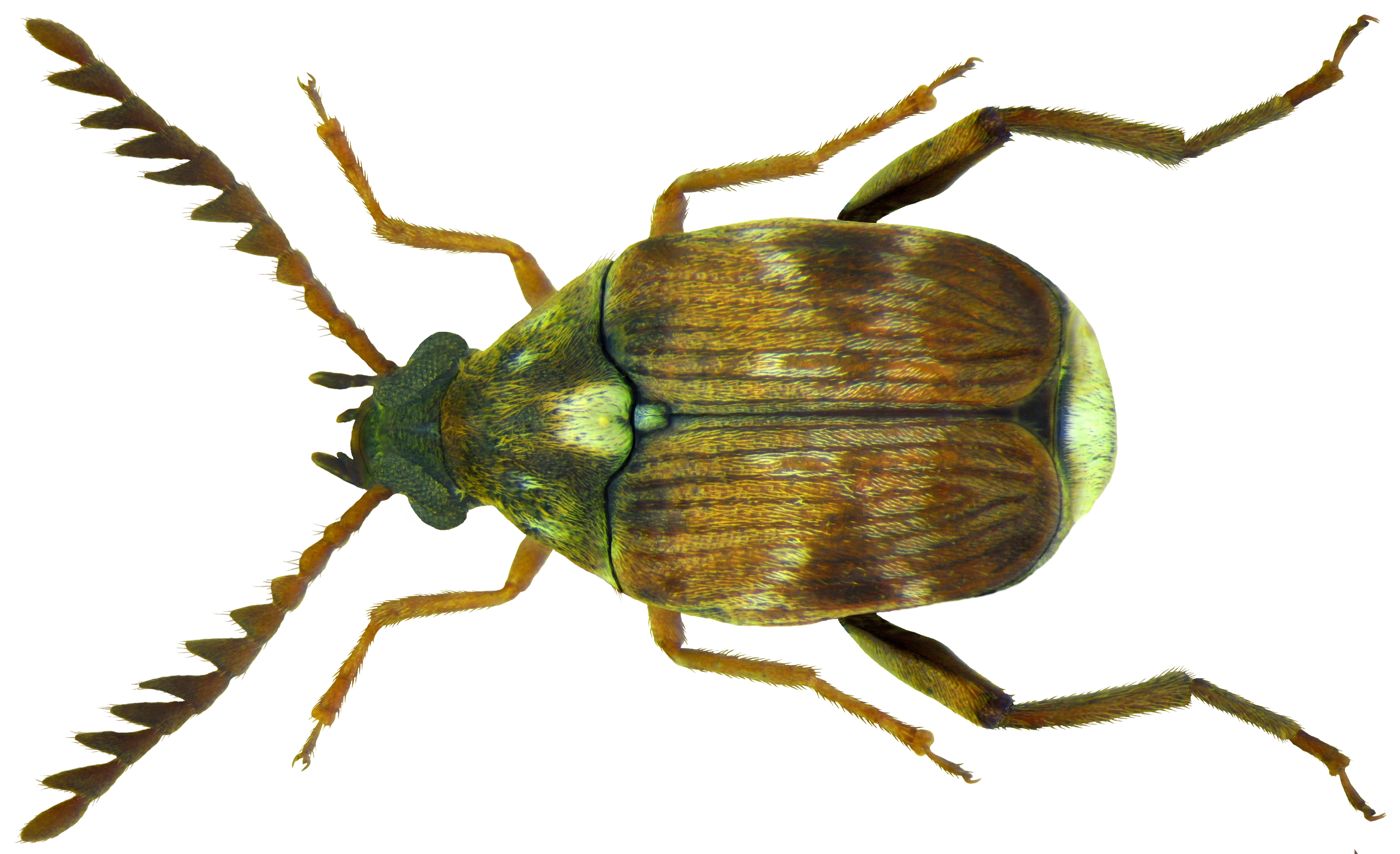

Scientific classification
- Kingdom: Animalia
- Phylum: Arthropoda
- Clade: Pancrustacea
- Class: Insecta
- Order: Coleoptera
- Suborder: Polyphaga
- Infraorder: Cucujiformia
- Family: Chrysomelidae
- Genus: Callosobruchus
- Species: C. chinensis

Binomial name
- Callosobruchus chinensis (Linnaeus, 1758)

= Callosobruchus chinensis =

Common species of beetle

Callosobruchus chinensis, also known as the adzuki bean weevil, pulse beetle, Chinese bruchid or cowpea bruchid, is a common species of beetle found in the bean weevil subfamily. Although it is commonly known as the "adzuki bean weevil" it is in fact not a true weevil, belonging instead to the leaf beetle family, Chrysomelidae.

C. chinensis is originally distributed in the tropics and subtropics of Asia. The first recorded sighting and description of C. chinensis was in China, where the species gets its name. They are now spread worldwide due to the international trade of legumes.

C. chinensis is known to be a pest to many stored legumes, including green gram, lentil, cowpea, pigeon pea, chickpea and split pea. The majority of their lifespan is spent on the host plant, such as growth, feed and reproduction. The penetration throughout the legume can lead to severe damage to the plant quality and thus cause huge economic loss. C. chinensis is one of the most damaging crop pests to the stored legume industry due to their generalized legume diets and wide distribution.

This species has a very similar lifestyle and habitat to Callosobruchus maculatus and their identities are often mistaken for each other. It also exhibits reproductive interference with C. maculatus. These beetles can be monandrous or polyandrous, depending on their environment.

== Description ==
=== Physiology ===
C. chinensis is a small insect, growing to be about 5 mm in length as an adult. Unlike true weevils, C. chinensis has no snout. Adults are described as being brown in color, with black and grey patches over the body. The abdomen of the female is slightly longer than the elytra, and it is white in colour with two oval black spots on it. This species exhibits some sexual dimorphism, with the female being larger and heavier than the male beetle. The adults are capable of flight and they can disperse to other fields and bean storage sites easily using this method. The larvae are yellowish-white in color, with reduced legs. The pupae are dark brown, and pupation occurs inside the legume. The eggs occur singly and have a yellow coloring which become opaque when hatched. Their eggs become much smaller in areas of high population density to accommodate for competition of resources in the legume, which results in smaller adults and less fit larvae.

=== Flightless vs. flight forms ===
C. chinensis have two morphologies: active or flight forms and sedentary or flightless forms. These forms have various physical and biological differences. Flightless form adults emerge earlier from dry seeds, and flight form adults emerge later from pods. In addition, flight forms have lighter colored and larger bodies, which might be necessary to fly and blend in with the environment. Flight form females also have larger wings, which could be helpful in finding pods to lay their eggs on. In contrast, flightless forms that emerge from dry seeds in storage have darker and smaller bodies. Flightless forms also show lower pre-maturation periods, lower fecundity, and shorter adult lifespans compared to flight forms. These differences might be adaptations to field conditions where pods grow for longer periods of time compared to storage conditions where flightless forms emerge earlier.

=== Antennae ===
According to electron microscopy studies, antennae are composed of sections called a scape, a pedicel, and nine flagellomeres, which are used for movement of the antennae. However, the antennae are pectinate, or narrow, in males, while, in females, the antennae are serrate, or thicker and notched. Female antennae are shorter, while male antennae are longer. The antennae are composed of sensilla, which are used for the perception of stimuli. There are sensilla that detect odors, pheromones, and chemicals, and each is located and distributed in a specific location on the antennae.

== Distribution and habitat ==
C. chinensis displays a cosmopolitan distribution pattern and has been spotted in most countries due to the commercial export of beans. The beetle's natural ranges are in the tropics and subtropics of Asia, and their population has grown extensively since the cultivation and distribution of legumes. Their distribution is heavily influenced by human production since they only live on legumes suitable for mating and feeding their larvae.

Some of their common host plants include green gram, lentil, cowpea, pigeon pea, chickpea and other pea species, though they are known to live on a larger variety of legume hosts. The species' most preferred habitat is in the tropics, on green gram or chickpeas.

C. chinensis reaches the height of egg production and legume infestation in July–August.

== Food resources ==
Both the larvae and the adults feed on the legume. In general, C. chinensis can feed on any legume type that they can live on, including beans, lentils, chickpeas and split peas.

== Oviposition ==
Females lay one egg in a single seed. They avoid seeds that already have eggs by detecting physicochemical stimuli. However, when resources are scarce, females may lay multiple eggs on a single seed. Despite this, the distribution of eggs is regular, which indicates that C. chinensis determines how many eggs are in a seed. Laying as few eggs as possible on a seed could reduce competition between larvae in a seed, which is beneficial for the survival of offspring even if looking for empty seeds may require more energy expenditure for the mother. The instar development duration decreases when there are more than two larvae in a seed. A study found that, as the number of eggs on a seed increased, reproduction rate decreased and instar mortality increased.

== Life history ==
Adzuki bean weevil females lay their eggs directly on the surface of the legume singly and move on to either a different part of the legume or to a different one depending on bean density and competition among other females. They can lay as many as 90 eggs after a single fertilization. Fecundity is relative to which legume is being used as a host and female fitness. The eggs usually hatch after 3–5 days and the new larvae will burrow into the bean for the rest of development.

The larvae chew tunnels through the bean until it is ready to pupate. Mature adults emerge from the bean, biting a neat circular exit from the pod 25 days after hatching. The adult beetles live up to two weeks after emerging from the pupa.

The total life cycle of C. chinensis ranges from 29 to 39 days depending on different pulses they grow in. The incubation period ranges from 4 to 6 days, the larval period from 12 to 20 days, the pupal period from 7 to 10 days, and adult longevity from 7 to 20 days.

== Parasitism ==
C. chinensis are host to various parasites, including mites that prey on eggs and wasp species that are larval parasitoids. A. calandrae is a parasitic wasp that attack C. chinensis by laying their eggs in seeds with C. chinensis eggs. A. calandrae paralyze host larvae so that their own larvae can emerge and develop from the host seed. If C. chinensis lay more than one egg on a single seed, A. calandrae are able to find seeds more efficiently, which suggests why C. chinensis may avoid laying multiple eggs in one seed.

== Protective behavior ==
=== Death feigning ===
C. chinensis shows death feigning behavior as an anti-predatory technique. Certain stimuli will startle the beetle, and it will roll onto its back and curl its legs up. This is likely used in order to dissuade parasitoid wasps from preying on the beetle.

Temperature has been shown to alter this behavior in adult beetles. As temperatures rise, this behavior becomes less common. A larger body size also shows a decline in thanatosis.

== Mating ==
=== Male genital organ ===
Male C. chinensis have large genital sclerites located at the end of their intromittent organ. This is used to transfer sperm more effectively as they act as anchors attaching to the inside of the female genital opening. These sclerites do not appear to significantly damage the female reproductive tract, which is seen in similar species whose sclerites are less developed, like Callosobruchus maculatus. The male intromittent organ, when extended, can be almost twice the size of the beetle, but only the tip of it is inserted inside the female during reproduction.

=== Courting behavior ===
When male C. chinensis want to mate, they raise their antennae at the female and rub them against her. After rubbing, the male mounts the rear of the female, and even when the female escapes or attempts to escape, males continue to chase after and rub their antennae. Female courting behavior entails a calling position where it raises its abdomen while tipping the head down. While in this position, the female releases sex pheromones, and rubbing the abdomen with the hind legs may help in releasing the pheromones.

=== Sex pheromones ===
Sex pheromones are released by females from the abdomen during the first few days of adult life, and once a female has mated, the release of pheromones decreases. The release of the pheromone is highest during the first 4 days of adult life and then decreases drastically by day 7. During copulation, pheromones are released from both sexes, but only affect the male.

=== Cost of mating and egg production ===
Virgin C. chinensis females have a higher life span compared to females who only mate and females who mate and lay eggs, indicating that there is a cost to mating. In addition, C. chinensis females who only mate also have a higher life span than females who lay eggs, corroborating a cost to egg production. The production of eggs can be costly because it requires energy and limited resources, which may decrease the life span of females. In addition, C. maculatus males damage the female genital tract with their genitalia, which are made of a sclerotized spine. There could be a similar mechanism among C. chinensis males, which would be very costly to the female. However, this behavior has not been experimentally investigated.

=== Inbreeding ===
Female C. chinensis life spans are very short, so they mate quickly and regardless of relatedness. This breeding behavior leads to inbreeding.However, females can still recognize relatedness and prefer non-related mates. If given only one male, females mated indiscriminately, but if given two males (related and non-related), females chose mates that are unrelated. In addition, if females mated with related males, they were more likely to mate again compared to females who mated with unrelated males.

== Polyandry ==
It has been reported that C. chinensis females do not remate after mating once, but research has showed that some strains of C. chinensis exhibit polyandry. In the study, the polyandry strain is derived from the field, while the monandry strain is derived from the laboratory. Mating multiple times may produce offspring that are genetically diverse, which is beneficial in environments that change. Since laboratory environments are stable, polyandry may not provide the benefits that it does in the wild and, thus, monandry evolves. The study also found that polyandry can be selected for and is dominantly inherited.

Females that already mated once refuse to mate with males again by trying to escape. Females that refuse to mate again are generally smaller and have lower fecundity and life span. Possible explanations for this are that larger females may be able to store and use more sperm, and the cost of mating may not be as high. Male mating behavior may also affect whether females remate or not. If males can sense that females are more viable, they may attempt to mate more consistently.

=== Strategic ejaculation ===
Males also change their mating behavior depending on larval rearing density and polyandry. In a study, if females were polyandrous, males ejaculate more when they were reared under a high larval density compared to a low larval density. This is because there is a higher competition of sperm since there are more rival males that females could mate with. However, if females mated only once, males ejaculated more when they were reared under low larval density. In high larval densities, there are more females that males could mate with, so males might decrease the amount of sperm ejaculated in individual females so that they can save sperm to mate with more females.

== Reproductive interference ==
Reproductive interference between species can have various effects that reduce the fitness of individuals in either species. This type of interference is thought to be a mechanism behind species exclusion, where the sexually dominant species sexually excludes the less dominant species. C. chinensis males regularly attempt to copulate with female Callosobruchus maculatus. This is quite commonly observed in these insects as they are congeneric species of bean weevil with a major niche overlap. This indiscriminate heterospecific copulation behavior has been observed even when female C. chinensis are present.

C. chinensis are sexually dominant over C. maculatus, with C. chinensis males reducing fecundity in C. maculatus females much more than C. maculatus males do on C. chinensis females, though it is unclear as to why this happens. Males from both species do not tell apart conspecifics and attempt to mate with any female of either species. Despite this, the reduction in fecundity is still present because of copulation between C. chinensis males with C. maculatus females. Specifically, fecundity decreases in females after multiple copulations. While reproductive interference in these two beetles is mostly behavioral, C. chinensis males do copulate with C. maculatus females occasionally while C. maculatus males and C. chinensis females rarely do. C. chinensis also exhibit sexual harassment with males attempting to insert their penis into C. maculatus females. This behavior in C. chinensis males triggers C. maculatus females to avoid or escape mating much more than C. chinensis females. This could be because some C. chinensis females mate only once and refuse mating with other males. However, this behavior does not necessarily reduce fecundity in C. maculatus females.

== Interaction with the host plant ==
Mated female adults have preference behavior toward 2-hexenal and benzaldehyde. It was found that the mixture of a specific ratio of these two chemicals from some plants had high attraction toward the beetle of both genders, which reveals potential pest control treatment.

== Pest control ==
Since C. chinensis is a pest of stored legumes and pulses, various methods have been developed to control the population of C. chinensis in storage facilities.

=== Parasites as pest control ===
Using natural parasites of C. chinensis can be effective at reducing their populations in storage environments. While mites can prey on their eggs, they are not very effective because eggs are attached to the seeds instead of being loose. However, parasitic wasps can be very effective at removing or reducing the population size of C. chinensis. A study looking at the efficiency of parasites as biological pest controls found that parasitoids A. calandrae and L. distingeundus are able to find larvae at least 150 cm away through odor.

== See also ==
- Callosobruchus maculatus
