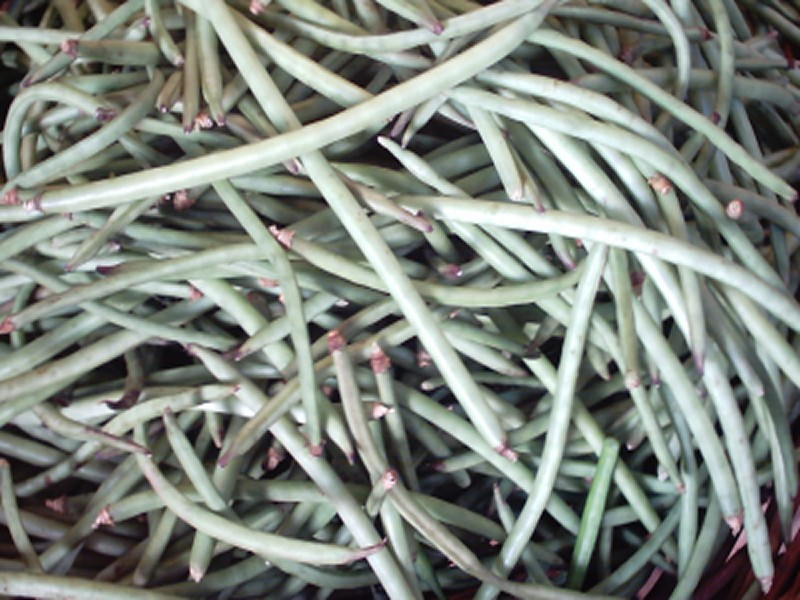
- Cowpeas

Scientific classification
- Kingdom: Plantae
- Clade: Tracheophytes
- Clade: Angiosperms
- Clade: Eudicots
- Clade: Rosids
- Order: Fabales
- Family: Fabaceae
- Subfamily: Faboideae
- Genus: Vigna
- Species: V. unguiculata

Binomial name
- Vigna unguiculata (L.) Walp.

Synonyms
- List: Dolichos catiang L.; Dolichos catjang Burm.f. nom. illeg.; Dolichos catjang L.; Dolichos hastifolius Schnizl.; Dolichos lubia Forssk.; Dolichos melanophthalamus DC.; Dolichos monachalis Brot.; Dolichos obliquifolius Schnizl.; Dolichos sesquipedalis L.; Dolichos sinensis Forssk. nom. illeg.; Dolichos sinensis L.; Dolichos sphaerospermus (L.) DC.; Dolichos tranquebaricus Jacq.; Dolichos unguiculata L.; Dolichos unguiculatus Thunb.; Liebrechtsia scabra De Wild.; Phaseolus cylindricus L.; Phaseolus sphaerospermus L.; Phaseolus unguiculatus (L.) Piper; Scytalis hispida E.Mey.; Scytalis protracta E.Mey.; Scytalis tenuis E.Mey.; Vigna alba (G.Don) Baker f.; Vigna angustifoliolata Verdc.; Vigna baoulensis A.Chev.; Vigna catjang (Burm.f.) Walp.; Vigna coerulea Baker; Vigna dekindtiana Harms; Vigna hispida (E.Mey.) Walp.; Vigna huillensis Baker; Vigna malosana Baker; Vigna protracta (E.Mey.) Walp.; Vigna pubescens R.Wilczek; Vigna rhomboidea Burtt Davy; Vigna scabra (De Wild.) T.Durand & H.Durand; Vigna scabrida Burtt Davy; Vigna sesquipedalis (L.) F. Agcaoili nom. illeg.; Vigna sesquipedalis (L.) Fruwirth; Vigna sinensis (L.) Endl. ex Hassk. nom. illeg.; Vigna sinensis (L.) Savi ex Hausskn.; Vigna tenuis (E.Mey.) F.Dietr.; Vigna triloba var. stenophylla Harv.

= Cowpea =

Species of plant

The cowpea (Vigna unguiculata) is an annual herbaceous legume from the genus Vigna. It can be erect, semierect (trailing), or climbing. A high level of morphological diversity is found within the species with large variations in the size, shape, and structure of the plant. Four subspecies are recognised, three of which are cultivated.

Its tolerance for sandy soil and low rainfall have made it an important crop in the semiarid regions across Africa and Asia. It was domesticated in Africa and is one of the oldest crops to be farmed. A second domestication event probably occurred in Asia, before they spread into Europe and the Americas.

Most cowpeas are grown on the African continent, particularly in Nigeria and Niger, which account for 66% of world production. A 1997 estimate suggests that cowpeas are cultivated on 12.5 million hectares (31 million acres) of land, have a worldwide production of 3 million tonnes and are consumed by 200 million people on a daily basis. Insect infestation is a major constraint to the production of cowpea, sometimes causing over 90% loss in yield. The legume pod borer Maruca vitrata is the main preharvest pest of the cowpea and the cowpea weevil Callosobruchus maculatus the main postharvest pest. It requires very few inputs, as the plant's root nodules are able to fix atmospheric nitrogen, making it a valuable crop for resource-poor farmers and well-suited to intercropping with other crops.

The crop is mainly grown for its seeds, which are high in protein, although the leaves and immature seed pods can also be consumed. The seeds are usually cooked and made into stews and curries, or ground into flour or paste. The whole plant is also used as forage for animals, with its use as cattle feed likely responsible for its name.

== Description ==
A large morphological diversity is found within the crop, and the growth conditions and grower preferences for each variety vary from region to region. However, as the plant is primarily self-pollinating, its genetic diversity within varieties is relatively low. Cowpeas can either be short and bushy (as short as 20 cm or 8 in) or act like a vine by climbing supports or trailing along the ground (to a height of 2 m or 6 ft 7 in). The taproot can penetrate to a depth of 2.4 m (7 ft 10 in) after eight weeks.

The size and shape of the leaves vary greatly, making this an important feature for classifying and distinguishing cowpea varieties. Another distinguishing feature of cowpeas is the long 20–50 cm (8–20 in) peduncles, which hold the flowers and seed pods. One peduncle can support four or more seed pods. Flower colour varies through different shades of purple, pink, yellow, and white and blue.

Seeds and seed pods from wild cowpeas are very small, whereas cultivated varieties can have pods between 10 and 110 cm (4 and 43 in) long. A pod can contain six to 13 seeds that are usually kidney-shaped, although the seeds become more spherical the more restricted they are within the pod. Their texture and colour are very diverse. They can have a smooth or rough coat and be speckled, mottled, or blotchy. Colours include white, cream, green, red, brown, and black, or various combinations.

== Taxonomy ==
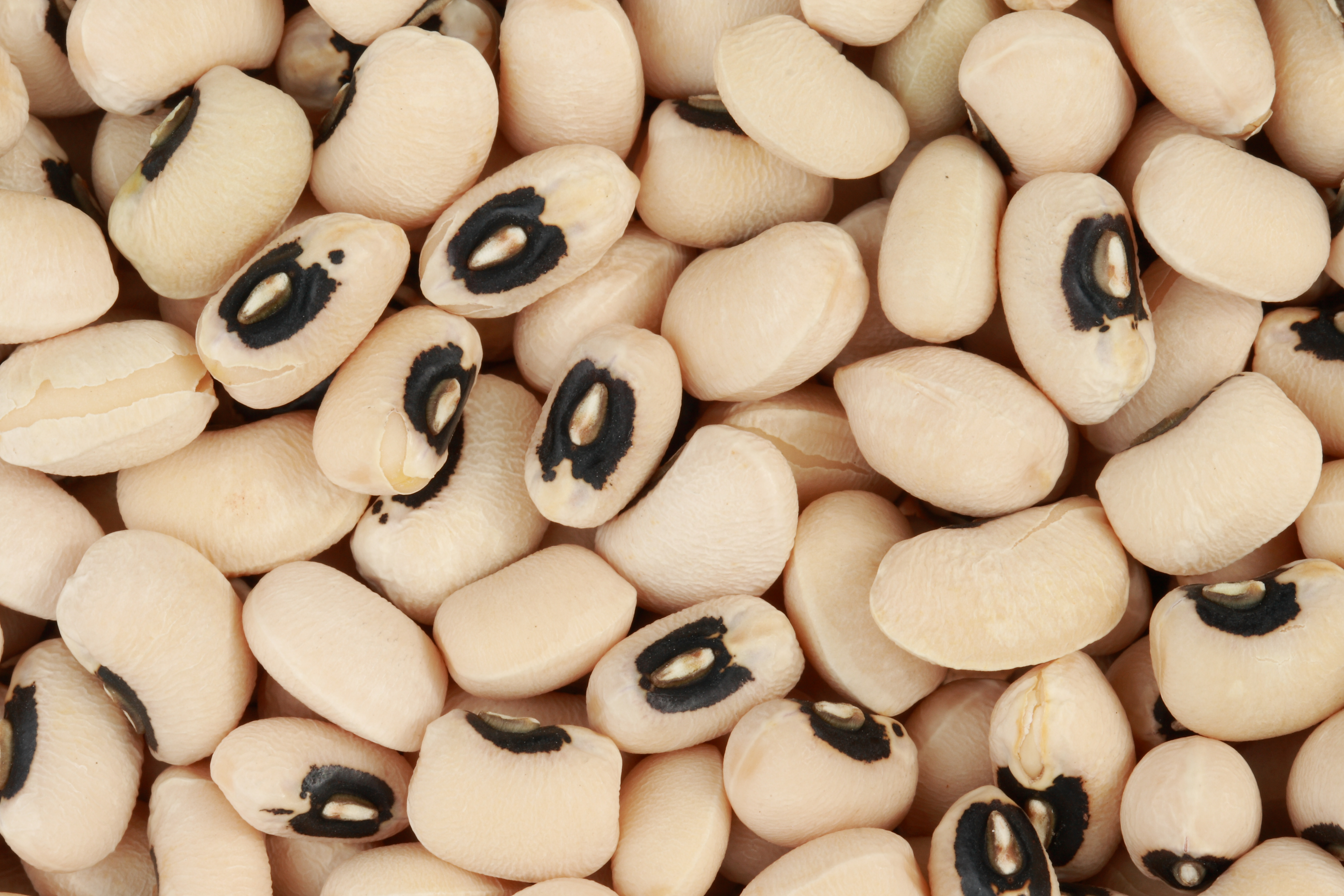
Black-eyed peas, a common name for a cowpea cultivar, are named due to the presence of a distinctive black spot on their hilum.

Vigna unguiculata is a member of the Vigna (peas and beans) genus. Unguiculata is Latin for "with a small claw", which reflects the small stalks on the flower petals. Common names for cultivated cowpeas include black-eye pea, southern pea, niebe (alternatively ñebbe), and crowder pea. All cultivated cowpeas are found within the universally accepted V. unguiculata subspecies unguiculata classification, which is then commonly divided into four cultivar groups: unguiculata, biflora, sesquipedalis, and textilis. The classification of the wild relatives within V. unguiculata is more complicated, with over 20 different names having been used and between 3 and 10 subgroups described. The original subgroups of stenophylla, dekindtiana, and tenuis appear to be common in all taxonomic treatments, while the variations pubescens and protractor were raised to subspecies level by a 1993 characterisation.

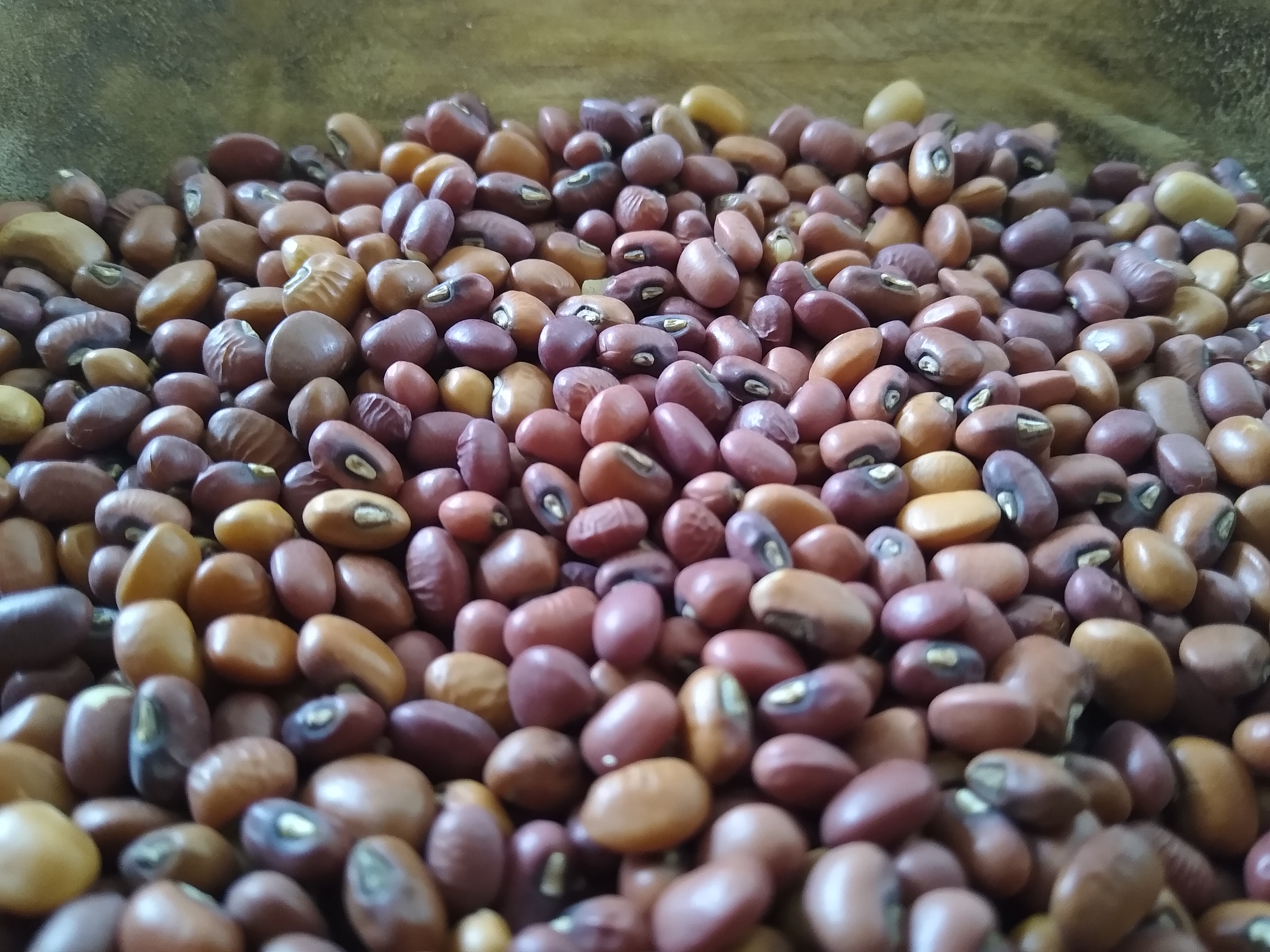
Sea Island red pea a cultivar of cowpea grown by the Gullah people on the Sea islands.

The first written reference of the word 'cowpea' appeared in 1798 in the United States. The name was most likely acquired due to their use as a fodder crop for cows. Black-eyed pea, a common name used for the unguiculata cultivar group, describes the presence of a distinctive black spot at the hilum of the seed. Black-eyed peas were first introduced to the southern states in the United States and some early varieties had peas squashed closely together in their pods, leading to the other common names of southern pea and crowder pea.

The sesquipedalis subspecies arrived in the United States via Asia. It is characterised by unusually long pods, leading to the Latin name (sesquipedalis means "foot and a half long") and the common names of yardlong bean, asparagus bean, and Chinese long-bean.

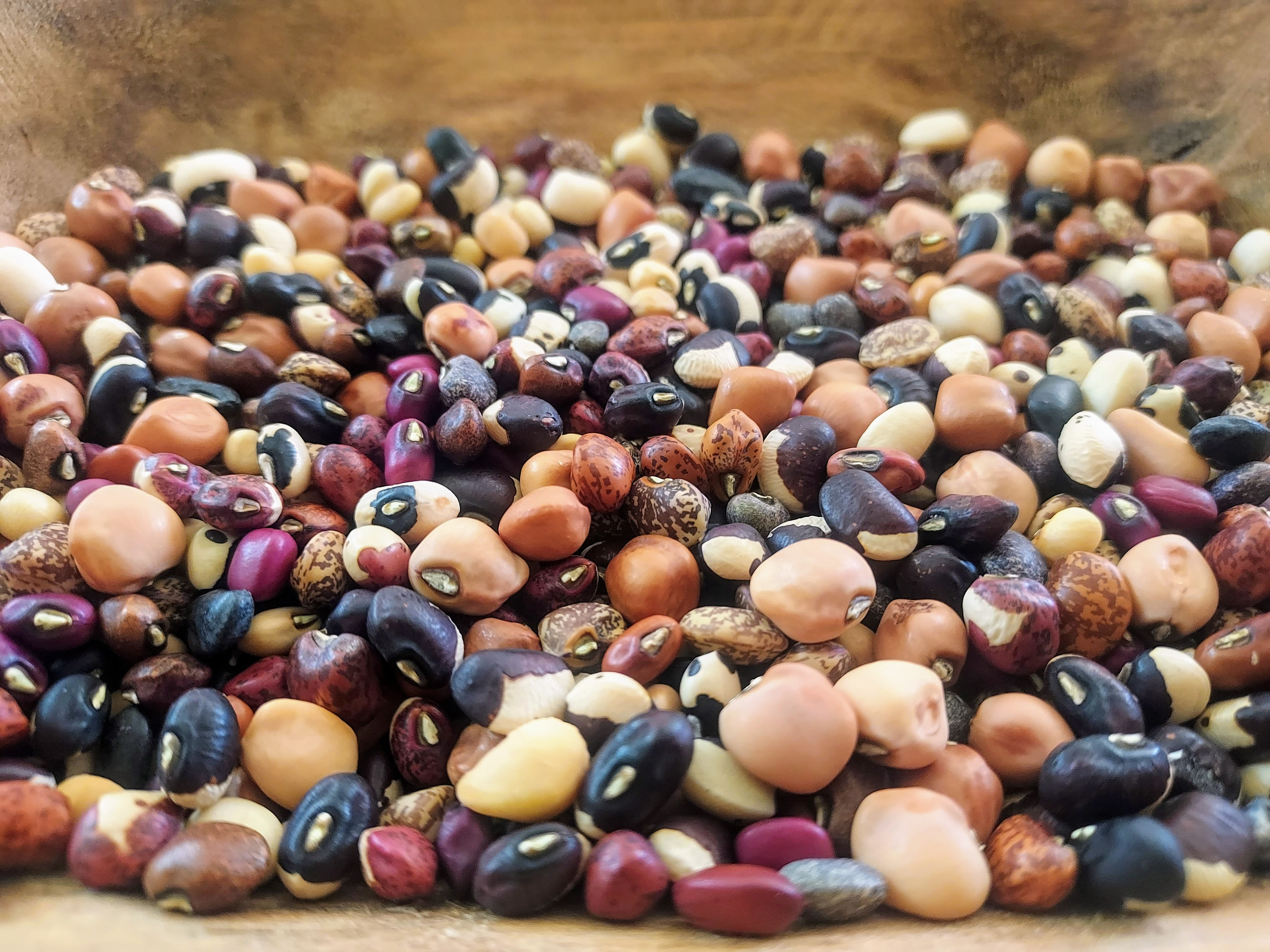
A selection of different cowpea cultivars displayed in a wooden bowl.

Common names of Vigna unguiculata unguiculata cultivar groups
Group	Common name
Unguiculata	black-eyed pea, crowder-pea, southern pea, niebe, ñebbe
Biflora	catjang, sow-pea
Sesquipedalis	yardlong bean, asparagus bean, Chinese long-bean
Textilis	wild cowpea, African cowpea, Ethiopian cowpea

== History ==
Compared to most other important crops, little is known about the domestication, dispersal, and cultivation history of the cowpea. Although there is no archaeological evidence for early cowpea cultivation, the centre of diversity of the cultivated cowpea is West Africa, leading an early consensus that this is the likely centre of origin and place of early domestication. New research using molecular markers has suggested that domestication may have instead occurred in East Africa and currently both theories carry equal weight. Recent archaeobotanical data from East Africa has indicated that cowpea did not spread as a single, uniform crop package. Data from this study showed that its integration came in multiple waves with migrating populations.

While the date that cultivation began may be uncertain, it is still considered one of the oldest domesticated crops. Remains of charred cowpeas from rock shelters in Central Ghana have been dated to the 2nd millennium BC. In 2300 BC, the cowpea is believed to have made its way into Southeast Asia, where secondary domestication events may have occurred. From there they traveled north to the Mediterranean, where they were used by the Greeks and Romans. The first written references to the cowpea were in 300 BC and they probably reached Central and North America during the slave trade through the 17th to early 19th centuries.

== Cultivation ==
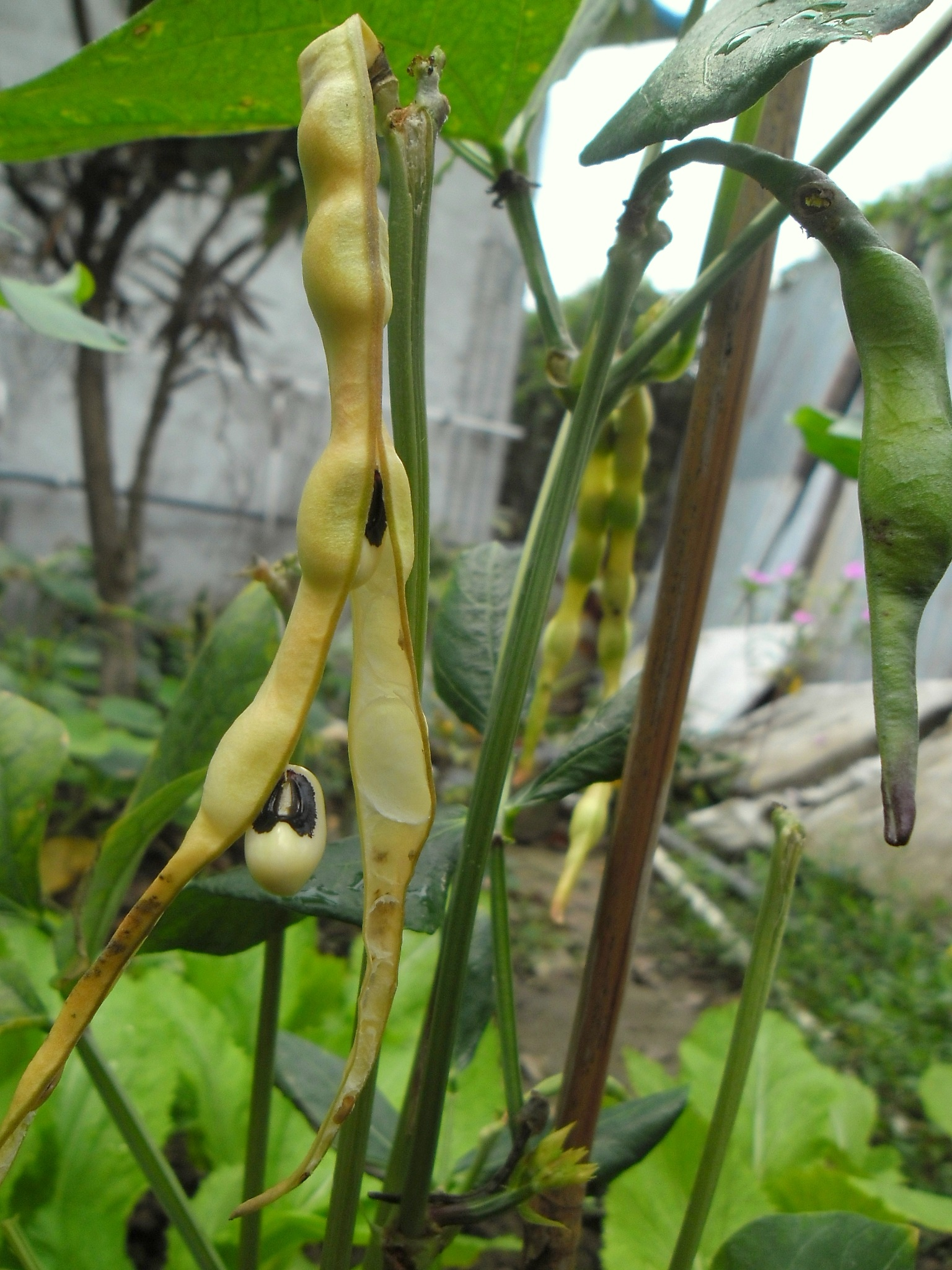
A cowpea plant with some pods ready for harvest

Cowpeas thrive in poor dry conditions, growing well in soils up to 85% sand. This makes them a particularly important crop in arid, semidesert regions where not many other crops will grow. As well as an important source of food for humans in poor, arid regions, the crop can also be used as feed for livestock. Its nitrogen-fixing ability means that as well as functioning as a sole crop, the cowpea can be effectively intercropped with sorghum, millet, maize, cassava, or cotton.

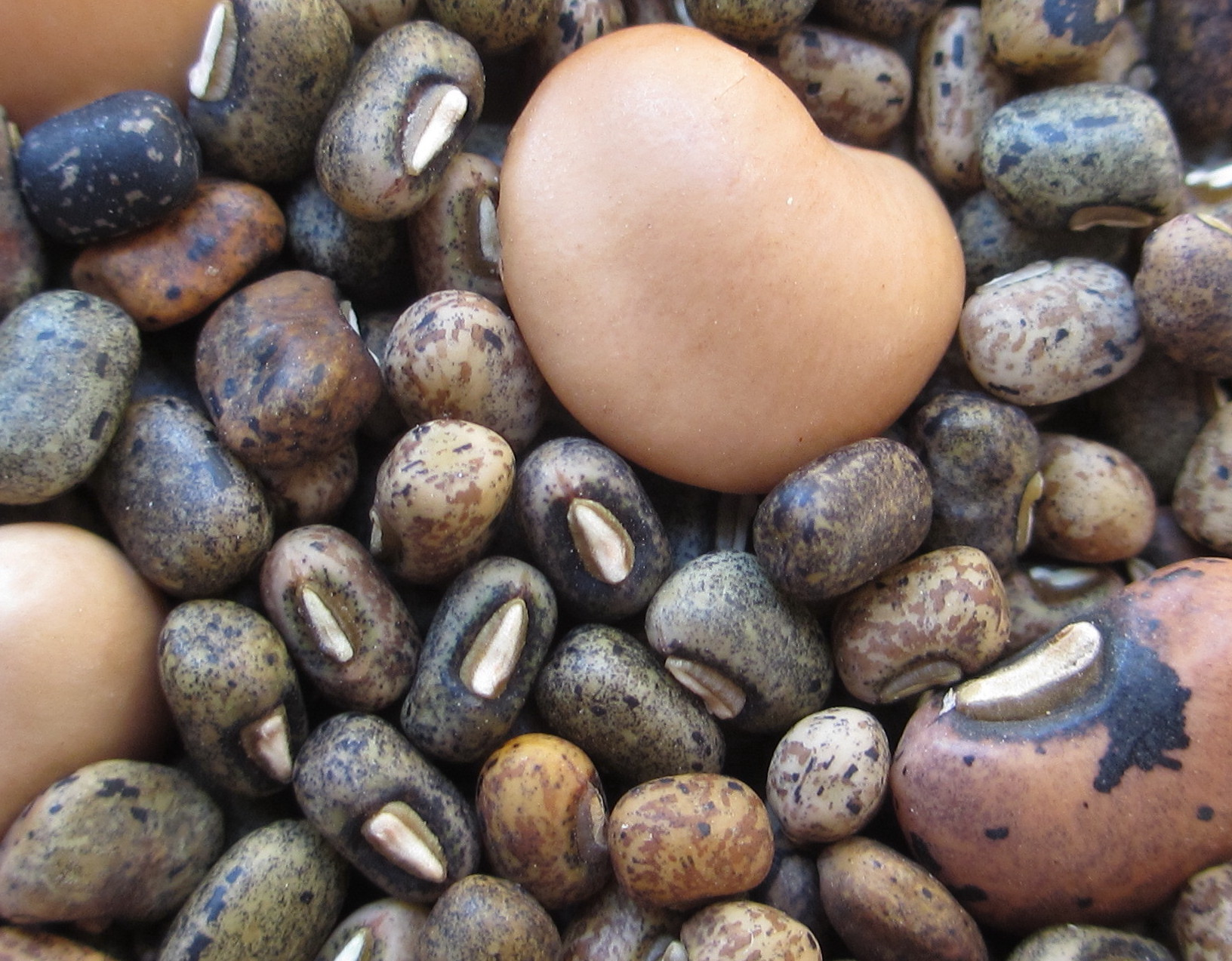
Seeds from the wild-type cowpea are much smaller than the cultivated varieties

The optimum temperature for cowpea growth is 30 °C (86 °F), making it only available as a summer crop for most of the world. It grows best in regions with an annual rainfall between 400 and 700 mm (16 and 28 in). The ideal soils are sandy and it has better tolerance for infertile and acid soil than most other crops. Generally, 133,000 seeds are planted per hectare (54,000/acre) for the erect varieties and 60,000 per hectare (24,000/acre) for the climbing and trailing varieties. The seeds can be harvested after about 100 days or the whole plant used as forage after about 120 days. Leaves can be picked from 4 weeks after planting.

These characteristics, along with its low fertilisation requirements, make the cowpea an ideal crop for resource-poor farmers living in the Sahel region of West Africa. Early-maturing varieties of the crop can thrive in the semiarid climate, where rainfall is often less than 500 mm (20 in). The timing of planting is crucial, as the plant must mature during the seasonal rains. The crop is mostly intercropped with pearl millet, and plants are selected that provide both food and fodder value instead of the more specialised varieties.

Storage of the seeds can be problematic in Africa due to potential infestation by postharvest pests. Traditional methods of protecting stored grain include using the insecticidal properties of Neem extracts, mixing the grain with ash or sand, using vegetable oils, combining ash and oil into a soap solution or treating the cowpea pods with smoke or heat. More modern methods include storage in airtight containers, using gamma irradiation, or heating or freezing the seeds. Temperatures of 60 °C (140 °F) kill the weevil larvae, leading to a recent push to develop cheap forms of solar heating that can be used to treat stored grain. One of the more recent developments is the use a cheap, reusable double-bagging system (called PICS) that asphyxiates the cowpea weevils.

=== Pests and diseases ===
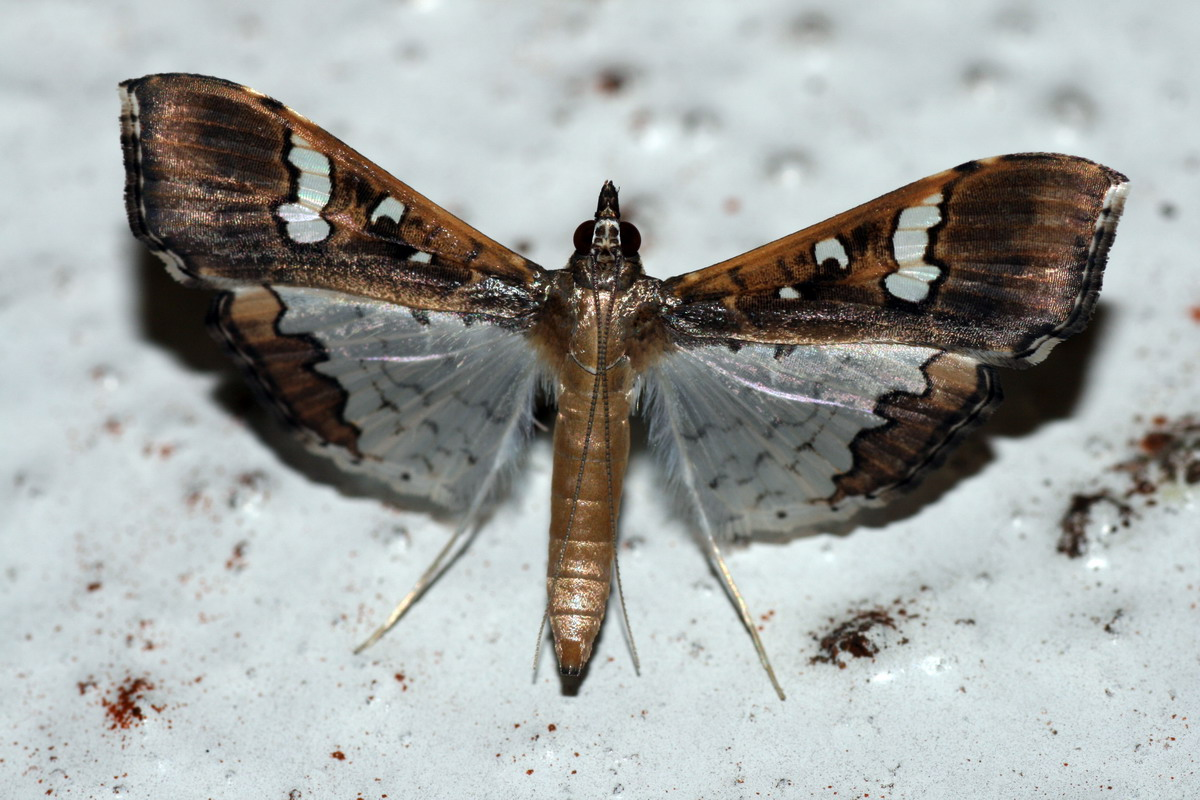
Maruca vitrata, commonly called the maruca pod borer, is one of the most damaging insect pests to the cowpea plant.

Insects are a major factor in the low yields of African cowpea crops, and they affect each tissue component and developmental stage of the plant. In bad infestations, insect pressure is responsible for over 90% loss in yield. The legume pod borer, Maruca vitrata, is the main preharvest pest of the cowpea. Other important pests include pod sucking bugs, thrips, aphids, cowpea curculios and post-harvest beetles Callosobruchus maculatus and Callosobruchus chinensis.

M. vitrata causes the most damage to the growing cowpea due to their large host range and cosmopolitan distribution. It causes damage to the flower buds, flowers, and pods of the plant, with infestations resulting in a 20–88% loss of yield. While the insect can cause damage through all growth stages, most of the damage occurs during flowering. Biological control has had limited success, so most preventive methods rely on the use of agrichemicals. Genetically modified cowpeas has been developed to express the cry protein from Bacillus thuringiensis, which is toxic to lepidopteran species including the maruca. BT Cowpea was commercialised in Nigeria in 2019.

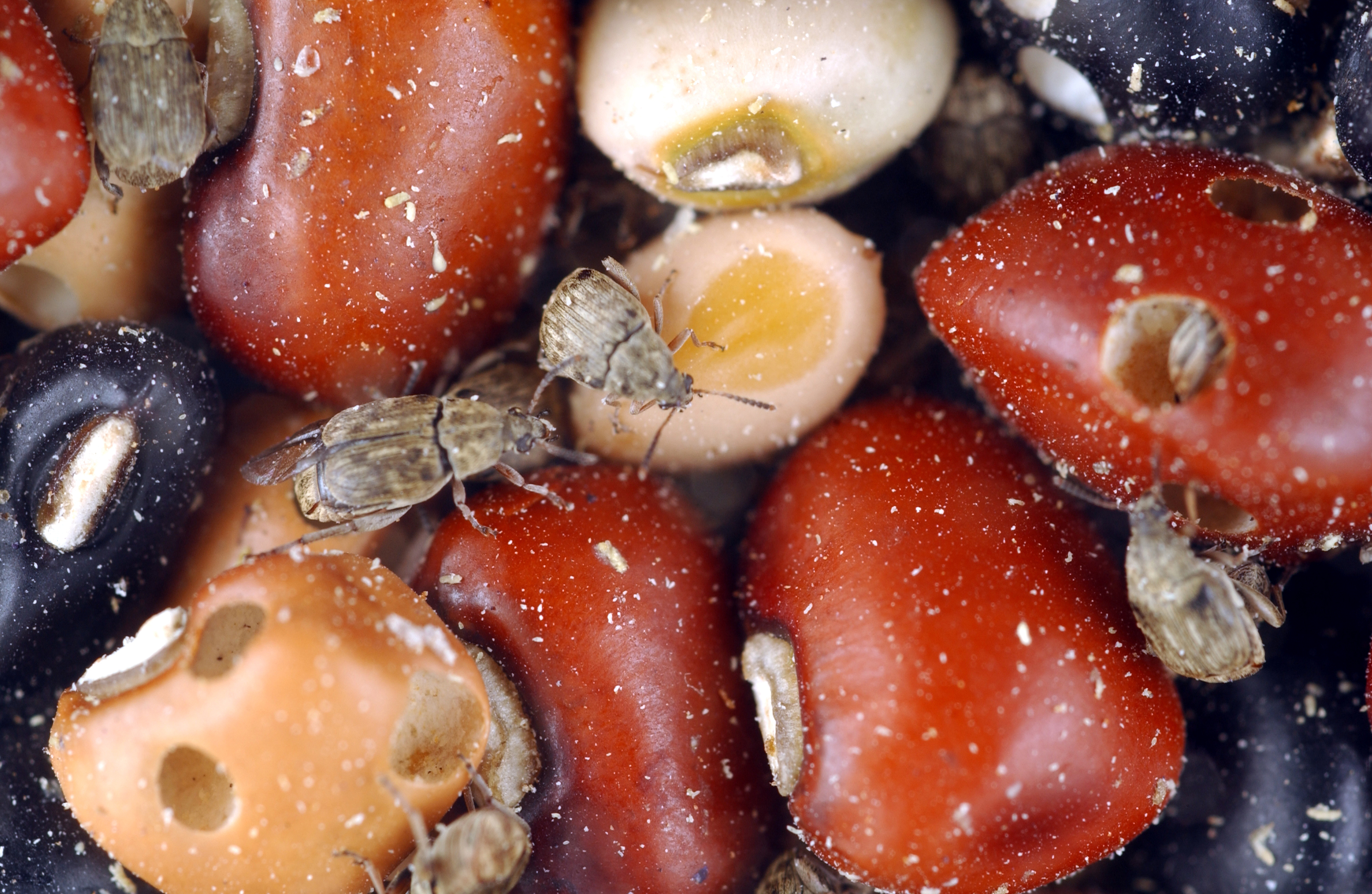
Cowpea weevil (Callosobruchus maculatus) infests stored cowpea seeds, resulting in major postharvest losses.

Severe C. maculatus infestations can affect 100% of the stored peas and cause up to 60% loss within a few months. The weevil generally enters the cowpea pod through holes before harvest and lays eggs on the dry seed. The larvae burrow their way into the seed, feeding on the endosperm. The weevil develops into a sexually mature adult within the seed. An individual bruchid can lay 20–40 eggs, and in optimal conditions, each egg can develop into a reproductively active adult in 3 weeks. The most common methods of protection involve the use of insecticides, the main pesticides used being carbamates, synthetic pyrethroids, and organophosphates.

Cowpea is susceptible to nematode, fungal, bacterial, and virus diseases, which can result in substantial loss in yield. Common diseases include blights, root rot, wilt, powdery mildew, root knot, rust and leaf spot. The plant is susceptible to mosaic viruses, which cause a green mosaic pattern to appear in the leaves. The cowpea mosaic virus (CPMV), discovered in 1959, has become a useful research tool. CPMV is stable and easy to propagate to a high yield, making it useful in vector development and protein expression systems. One of the plant's defenses against some insect attacks is the cowpea trypsin inhibitor (CpTI). CpTI has been transgenically inserted into other crops as a pest deterrent. CpTI is the only gene obtained outside of B. thuringiensis that has been inserted into a commercially available genetically modified crop.

Besides biotic stresses, cowpea also faces various challenges in different parts of the world such as drought, heat, and cold. Drought lowers the growth rate and development, ultimately reducing yield, although cowpea is considered more drought tolerant than most other crops. Drought at the preflowering stage in cowpea can reduce the yield potential by 360 kg/ha. Crop wild relatives are the prominent source of genetic material, which can be tapped to improve biotic/abiotic tolerance in crops. International Institute of Tropical Agriculture (IITA), Nigeria and Institut de l'Environment et de Recherches Agricoles are looking to tap into the genetic diversity of wild cowpeas and transfer that into cultivars to make them more tolerant to different stresses and adaptive to climate change.

== Production and consumption ==
Cow peas, dry production, 2020
Country	Weight (tonnes)
Nigeria	3,647,115
Niger	2,637,486
Burkina Faso	666,023
Kenya	264,160
Senegal	253,897
All others	1,447,422
World	8,916,103

Most cowpeas are grown on the African continent, particularly in Nigeria and Niger, which account for 66% of world cowpea production. The Sahel region also contains other major producers such as Burkina Faso, Ghana, Senegal, and Mali. Niger is the main exporter of cowpeas and Nigeria the main importer. Exact figures for cowpea production are hard to come up with as it is not a major export crop. Estimating world cowpea production is rather difficult, as it is usually grown in a mixture with other crops, but according to a 1997 estimate, cowpeas were cultivated on 12.5 million hectares (31 million acres) and had a worldwide production of 3 million metric tons (3,000,000 long tons; 3,300,000 short tons). While they play a key role in subsistence farming and livestock fodder, the cowpea is also seen as a major cash crop by Central and West African farmers, with an estimated 200 million people consuming cowpea on a daily basis.

According to the Food and Agriculture Organization of the United Nations, as of 2012, the average cowpea yield in Western Africa was an estimated 483 kilograms per hectare (431 lb/acre), which is still 50% below the estimated potential production yield. In some tradition cropping methods, the yield can be as low as 100 kilograms per hectare (89 lb/acre).

Outside Africa, the major production areas are Asia, Central America, and South America. Brazil is the world's second-leading producer of cowpea seed, accounting for 17% of annual cowpea production, although most is consumed within the country.

Production of cow peas

Cow pea yield

== Nutrition ==
Cowpea (raw seeds)
Nutritional value per 100 g (3.5 oz)
- Energy: 336 kcal (1,410 kJ)
- Carbohydrates: 60.03 g
- Sugars: 6.9 g
- Dietary fiber: 10.6 g
- Fat: 1.26 g
- Saturated: 0.331
- Monounsaturated: 0.011
- Polyunsaturated: 0.542
- Protein: 23.52 g
Vitamins and minerals
Vitamins	Quantity %DV^{†}
Vitamin A equiv.	0% 3 μg
Vitamin A	50 IU
Thiamine (B1)	71% 0.853 mg
Riboflavin (B2)	17% 0.226 mg
Niacin (B3)	13% 2.075 mg
Vitamin B6	21% 0.357 mg
Folate (B9)	158% 633 μg
Vitamin C	2% 1.5 mg
Vitamin K	4% 5 μg
Minerals	Quantity %DV^{†}
Calcium	8% 110 mg
Iron	46% 8.27 mg
Magnesium	44% 184 mg
Phosphorus	34% 424 mg
Potassium	37% 1112 mg
Sodium	1% 16 mg
Zinc	31% 3.37 mg
- Other constituents: Quantity
- Water: 11.95 g
- Link to USDA Database entry
- ^{†}Percentages estimated using US recommendations for adults, except for potassium, which is estimated based on expert recommendation from the National Academies.

Cowpea seeds provide a rich source of proteins and food energy, as well as minerals and vitamins. This complements the mainly cereal diet in countries that grow cowpeas as a major food crop. A seed can consist of 25% protein and has very low fat content. Cowpea starch is digested more slowly than the starch from cereals, which is more beneficial to human health. The grain is a rich source of folic acid, an important vitamin that helps prevent neural tube defects in unborn babies.

The cowpea has often been referred to as "poor man's meat" due to the high levels of protein found in the seeds and leaves. However, it does contain some antinutritional elements, notable phytic acid and protease inhibitors, which reduce the nutritional value of the crop. Methods such as fermentation, soaking, germination, debranning, and autoclaving are used to combat the antinutritional properties of the cowpea by increasing the bioavailability of nutrients within the crop. Although little research has been conducted on the nutritional value of the leaves and immature pods, what is available suggests that the leaves have a similar nutritional value to black nightshade and sweet potato leaves, while the green pods have less antinutritional factors than the dried seeds.

== Culinary uses ==
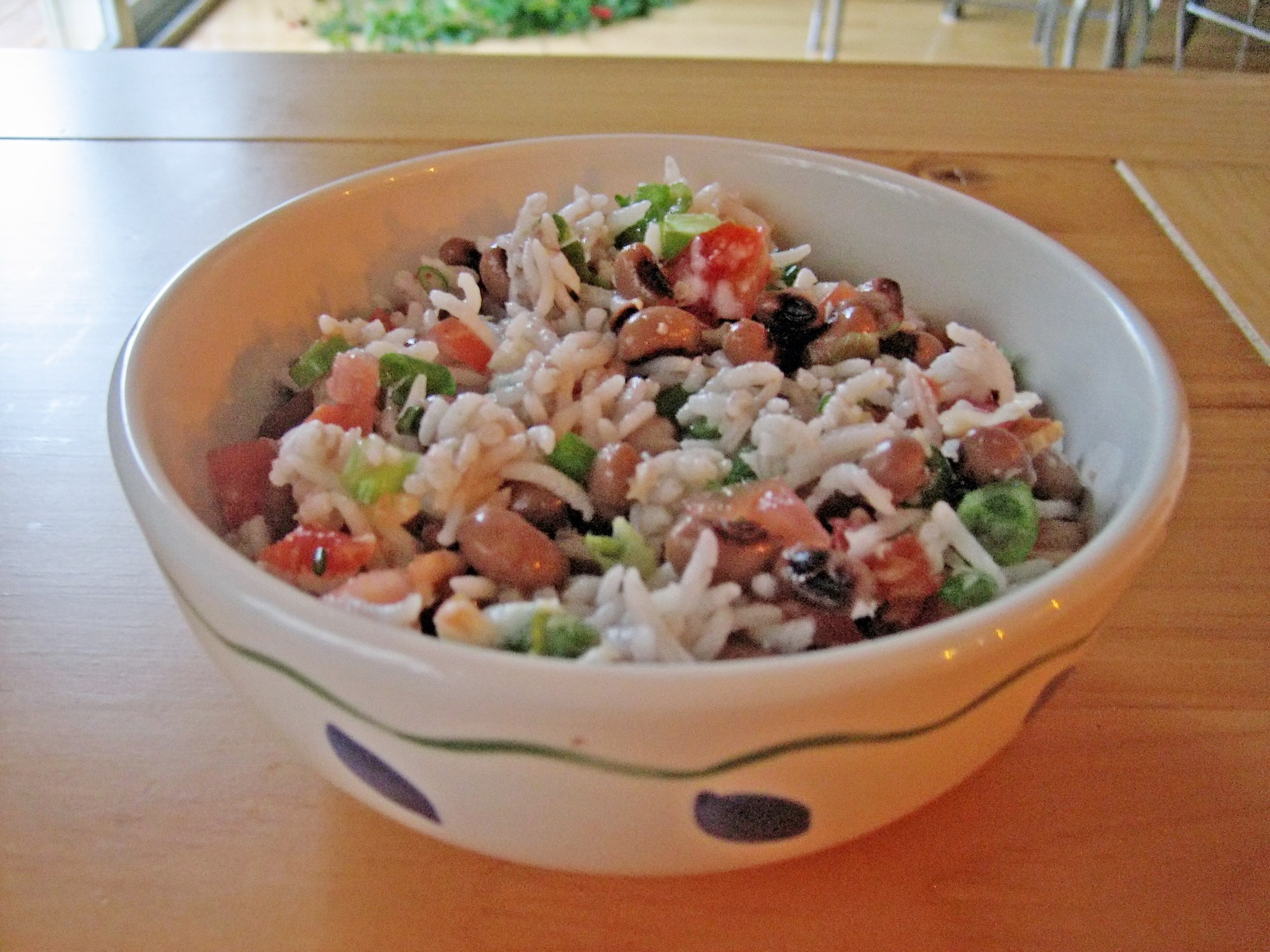
Hoppin' John is a common meal in the rural Southern United States.

Cowpeas are grown mostly for their edible beans, although the leaves, green seeds and pods can also be consumed, meaning the cowpea can be used as a food source before the dried peas are harvested. Like other legumes, cowpeas are cooked to make them edible, usually by boiling. Cowpeas can be prepared in stews, soups, purees, casseroles and curries. They can also be processed into a paste or flour. Chinese long beans can be eaten raw or cooked, but as they easily become waterlogged are usually sautéed, stir-fried, or deep-fried.

A common snack in Africa is koki or moin-moin, where the cowpeas are mashed into a paste, mixed with spices and steamed in banana leaves. Dan wake cowpea dumplings are common in northern Nigeria and environs. They also use the cowpea paste as a supplement in infant formula when weaning babies off milk. Slaves brought to America and the West Indies cooked cowpeas much the same way as they did in Africa, although many people in the American South considered cowpeas not suitable for human consumption. A popular dish was Hoppin' John, which contained black-eyed peas cooked with rice and seasoned with pork. Over time, cowpeas became more universally accepted and now Hoppin' John is seen as a traditional Southern dish ritually served on New Year's Day.
