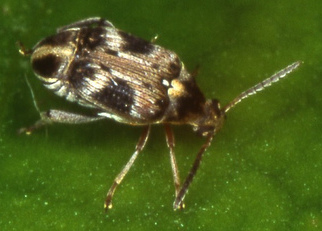
- Female Callosobruchus maculatus
- Vibrometric recording of Callosobruchus maculatus feeding inside a seed.

Scientific classification
- Kingdom: Animalia
- Phylum: Arthropoda
- Class: Insecta
- Order: Coleoptera
- Suborder: Polyphaga
- Infraorder: Cucujiformia
- Family: Chrysomelidae
- Genus: Callosobruchus
- Species: C. maculatus

Binomial name
- Callosobruchus maculatus (Fabricius, 1775)

Synonyms
- Bruchus ambiguus Gyllenhal, 1839; Bruchus calcaratus Wollaston, 1867; Bruchus maculatus Fabricius, 1775; Bruchus millingeni Pic, 1900; Bruchus ornatus Boheman, 1829; Bruchus quadrimaculatus Fabricius, 1792; Bruchus sinuatus Fåhraeus, 1839; Bruchus trabuti Caillol, 1919; Bruchus vicinus Gyllenhal, 1833

= Callosobruchus maculatus =

Species of beetle

Callosobruchus maculatus is a species of beetles known commonly as the cowpea weevil or cowpea seed beetle. It is a member of the leaf beetle family, Chrysomelidae, and not a true weevil. It is often mistaken for Callosobruchus chinensis, another bean beetle species with a similar lifestyle. This common pest of stored legumes has a cosmopolitan distribution, occurring on every continent except Antarctica. The beetle most likely originated in West Africa and moved around the globe with the trade of legumes and other crops. As only a small number of individuals were likely present in legumes carried by people to distant places, the populations that have invaded various parts of the globe have likely gone through multiple bottlenecks. Despite these bottlenecks and the subsequent rounds of inbreeding, these populations persist. This ability to withstand a high degree of inbreeding has likely contributed to this species’ prevalence as a pest.

It is used as a model organism for both research and education due to its quick generation time, sexual dimorphism, and ease of maintenance.

== Description ==
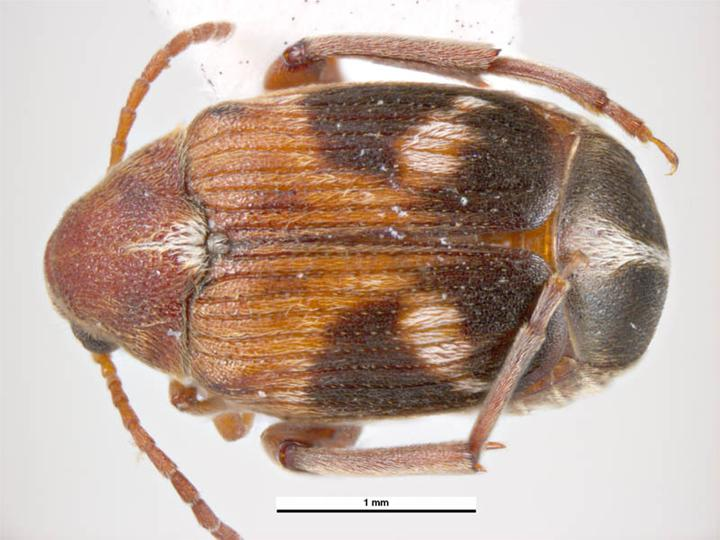
Female

The cowpea weevil lacks the "snout" of a true weevil. It is more elongated in shape than other members of the leaf beetle family. It is reddish-brown overall, with black and gray elytra marked with two central black spots. The last segment of the abdomen extends out from under the short elytra, and also has two black spots.

The beetle is sexually dimorphic and males are easily distinguished from females. The females are sometimes larger than males, but this is not true of all strains. Females are darker overall, while males are brown. The plate covering the end of the abdomen is large and dark in color along the sides in females, and smaller without the dark areas in males.

There are two morphs of C. maculatus, a flightless form and a flying form. The flying form is more common in beetles that developed in conditions of high larval density and high temperatures. The flying form has a longer lifespan and lower fecundity, and the sexes are less dimorphic and can be more difficult to tell apart.

The egg is clear, shiny, oval to spindle-shaped, and about 0.75 millimeters long. The larva is whitish in color.

== Life cycle ==
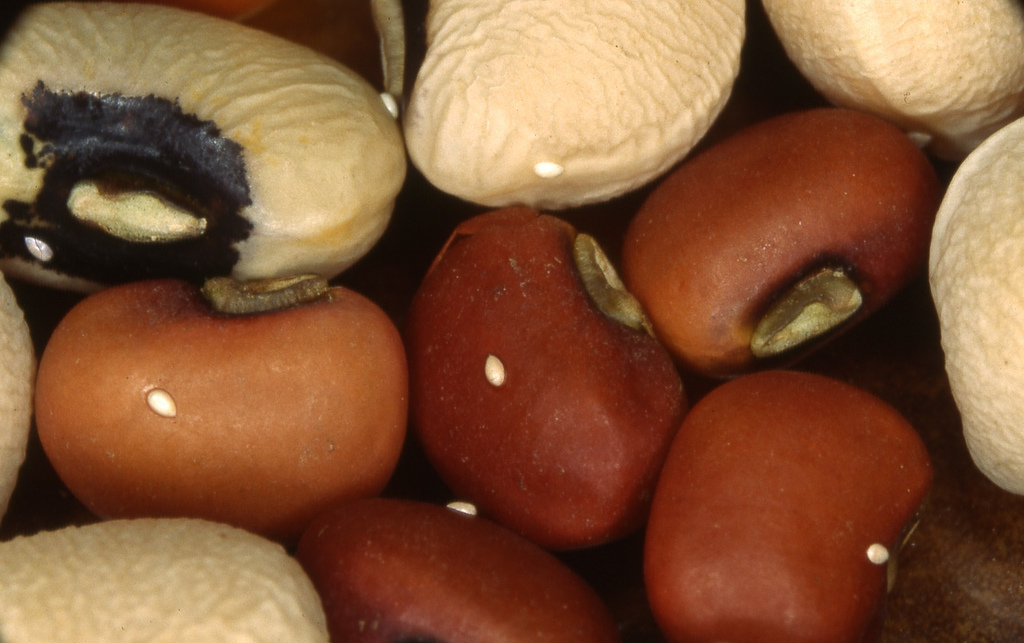
Eggs on cowpea and adzuki

A female adult can lay over a hundred eggs, and most of them will hatch. She lays an egg on the surface of a bean, and when the larva emerges about 4 to 8 days later, it burrows into the bean. During development, the larva feeds on the interior of the bean, eating the tissue just under the surface, leaving a very thin layer through which it will exit when it matures. It emerges after a larval period of 3 to 7 weeks, depending on conditions. In colder climates the gestation period is typically longer taking anywhere from 4–13 weeks to emerge.

Larval crowding can occur when up to 8 or 10 larvae feed and grow within one bean. Crowding limits resources for each individual, leading to longer development time, higher mortality, smaller adult size, and lower fecundity.

Once the beetle emerges as an adult, it may take 24 to 36 hours to mature completely. The lifespan is 10 to 14 days. However, in colder climates lifespans typically range from three to four weeks. The adult requires neither food nor water, but if offered water, sugared water, or yeast, it may consume it. A female given nutrients may lay more eggs.

The beetle tolerates a range of humidity and temperature, making it adaptable in climates worldwide. Its developmental time varies with factors such as humidity, temperature, legume type, crowding, and inbreeding levels in the population. A bean that is too dry will be impossible for the larva to bore into, and wet beans may have fungal growth. In experiments, a humidity range of 25% to 80% was acceptable, with different optimal levels at each life stage. The most eggs hatched between 44% and 63% humidity, and 44% produced the highest survival. The adult lives longer at 81% to 90%. In another experiment, temperatures of 17 °C (63 °F) and 37 °C (99 °F) with a constant humidity stressed the beetle, and the ideal temperature range was 24 °C (75 °F) to 28 °C (82 °F).

The age of the female at oviposition affects the development and survival of the offspring. The eggs of older females are less likely to hatch, the larvae take longer to develop, and fewer larvae survive to adulthood.

== Reproduction ==
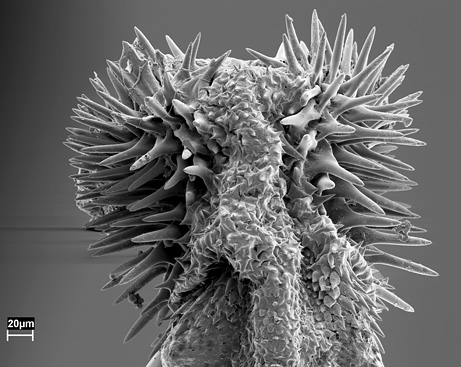
Callosobruchus maculatus penis

Copulation is injurious for the female beetle. The male possesses penile spines which damage the female reproductive tract. The female may forcefully kick the male during copulation, ending the mating. It is possible that male may benefit from harming the female because the injury could reduce matings or mating success with other males, or increase her egg production. When the female is experimentally prevented from kicking the male (by removal of the hind legs), matings continued for longer than usual, and injury increased. However, the amount of time before she became receptive again and the rate of oviposition were not affected. This suggests that penile spines do not increase the reproductive success of males, and it is suspected that the spines do not increase reproductive success for either sex, and may have no adaptive value.

After mating, the female glues single eggs to a bean. The female generally lays fewer eggs when there are fewer hosts. In an experiment, females presented with three large beans laid more eggs than females presented with three small beans. Occasionally, females deposit many eggs onto nonviable surfaces, especially if there are few or no hosts available. This leads to a higher mortality rate in eggs and potential larvae, but it may also lead to host expansion in the long term.

Recessive deleterious alleles of C. maculatus tend to be directly selected against in males but not in females. Mutations with deleterious effects on population growth due to their effects on females tend to be indirectly selected against and efficiently purged via their male siblings.

== Habitat ==
Temperature and humidity in legume storage areas are relatively constant and the food density is high. The female lays eggs on legumes in the field or in storage. Inbreeding is more common in laboratory situations where the beetle is allowed to breed continuously; breeding in the field is more limited.

The beetle is known for attacking the cowpea (Vigna unguiculata), but it readily attacks other beans and peas such as the mung bean (Vigna radiata) and adzuki bean (Vigna angularis). The adult is more likely to seek the legume in which it developed as a larva, but if it is not available or less common, the beetle will utilize another type.

== Behavior ==
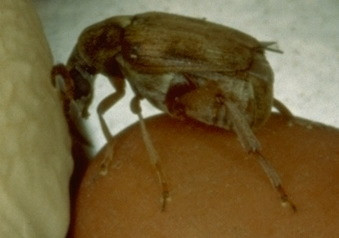
Male

Females are more likely than males to take advantage of sugar water or other resources. In an experiment to test the hypothesis that access to nutritional resources would affect the frequency of second matings, females with access to sugar were less likely to mate more than once. Available food makes the female less receptive to advances from males, which present a nuptial gift as part of courtship. The gift is a spermatophore, nutritional content mixed into his ejaculate, a package which can be up to 20% of his body weight. Females with other nutritional resources can afford to refuse a mating.

A female without an additional nutrient source is less choosy in the mating process. She does not even refuse matings with close relatives, such as brothers. The species does suffer from inbreeding depression, but it does not seem to take behavioral action to avoid it.

In addition, bean beetles are known to exhibit homosexual behavior. Males will mount both females and other males. This could potentially have fitness benefits for the male, as the male does not waste time determining whether his partner is male or female.

The female usually oviposits on the smooth side of a bean rather than the rough top, and it avoids legumes without smooth surfaces. It also has a way of distributing the eggs among small and large legumes so that each larva has access to roughly the same amount of nutrients; its assessment of legumes is based on mass rather than surface area, and on the number of eggs already present.

When preparing to pupate, the larva digs a cell in the bean and lines it with feces. If it encounters another larva in the bean, both retreat and create walls of feces. If the wall is removed, the two larvae fight to the death. This behavior is not well understood.

== Host preference ==
The bean beetle, Callosobruchus maculatus, oviposit their eggs on the cowpea bean. The species that are most common for the beetle to lay their eggs on are black eyed peas, mung beans, and adzuki beans. If more than one host is available, the beetle will choose its host depending on the variety and size of the bean as well as the texture of the seed coat. One study showed that the beetles will choose their host depending on the geographic region in which they live. It has also been found that the beetle will often switch hosts if a new host becomes available to them. Over time the beetles will start specializing on the new host and will lose preference for the ancestral host.

The beetle larvae grow inside the bean until they emerge as an adult. The time it takes the larvae to develop varies across hosts, with longer development times on less suitable hosts. It has been found that beetles that choose to oviposit their eggs on the black eyed pea have a shorter development time, suggesting that the black eyed pea is a more suitable host. The temperature and relative humidity have an effect on the developmental time as well; higher temperatures and a relative humidity range of 40%-60% shorten developmental time.

The emerged adult beetles mate assortatively, meaning they mate with others that developed on the same host bean. If the hybrids of the population are less fit, assortative mating can lead to speciation. One study looked at this and found speciation beginning to occur in early generations but because there was no selection against hybrids, recombination destroyed any linkage that was formed between host and mating preference which did not allow speciation to be completed.

== Predation ==
The predators of C. maculatus include several parasitoid wasps. Anisopteromalus calandrae, Uscana mukerjii, and Dinarmus wasps specifically target Callosobruchus species. Dinarmus basalis parasitizes small larvae and halts their development. This limits the damage they can do to beans, but their presence still makes the beans unfit for human consumption and usually makes them unfit for sowing, as well. Uscana mukerjii is an egg parasite which prevents the egg from hatching, thereby preventing damage to the legume.

== Control ==
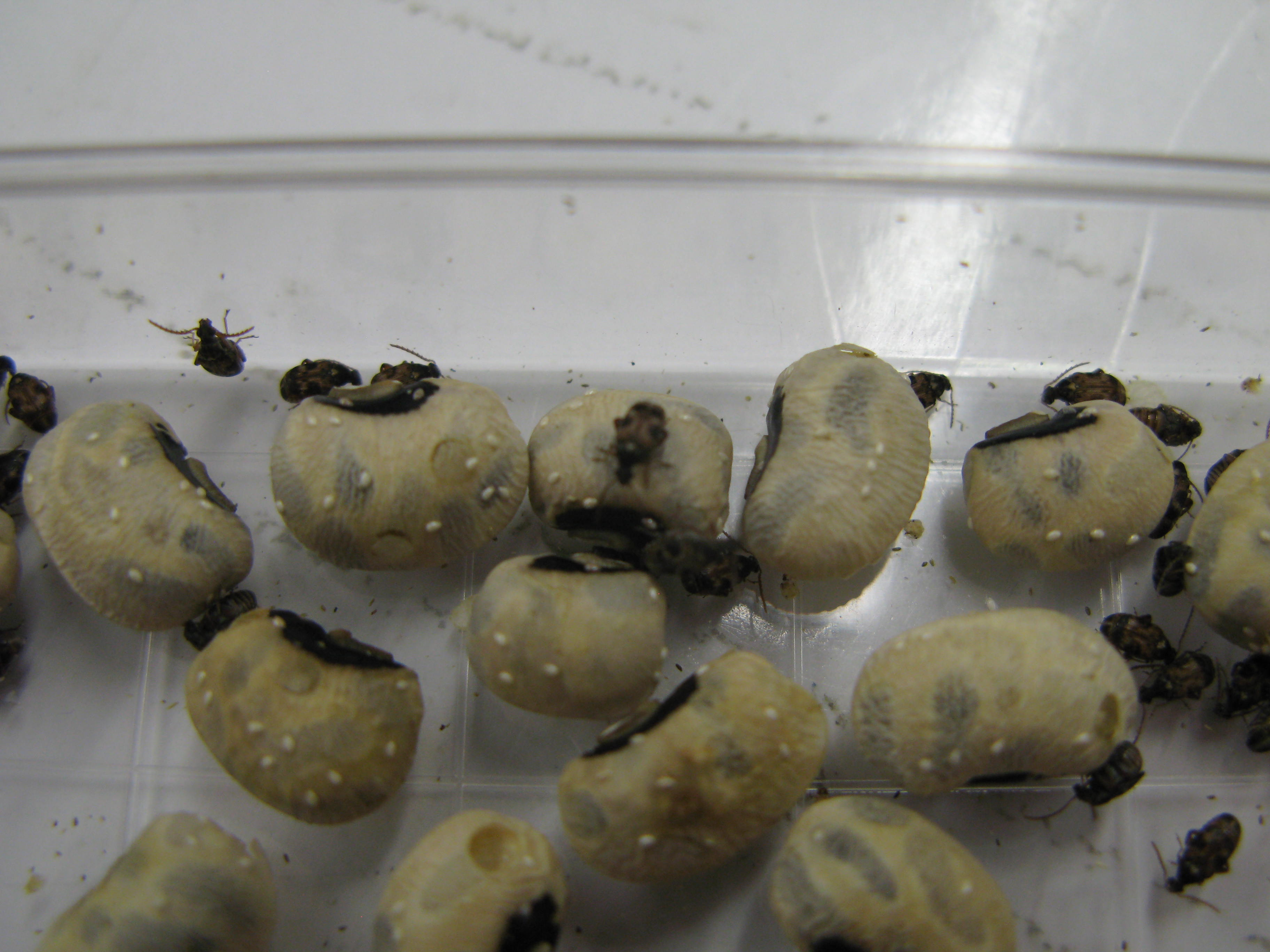
Damage on black-eyed peas

The beetle is considered "medically harmless" to humans. It is a damaging agricultural pest.

In developing countries, small-scale farmers mix the crushed leaves of Cassia occidentalis into bean stores to deter the beetle. Other Cassia are useful, as well. The powdered leaves are effective, and a warm-water extract and the essential oil from the seeds are better. The seed oil does not stop oviposition, but it increases the mortality of the eggs and the first-instar larvae. The warm-water extract deters the adult female from ovipositing.

Other botanical biological pest control agents tested include nishinda (Vitex negundo), Tasmanian blue gum (Eucalyptus globulus), bankalmi (Ipomoea sepiaria), neem (Azadirachta indica), safflower (Carthamus tinctorius), sesame (Sesamum indicum), and gum arabic (Acacia nilotica syn. Acacia arabica).

Hermetic storage technologies like the Purdue Improved Cowpea Storage bags have also proven successful in controlling C. maculatus. These technologies work by separating the container environment from the surrounding air and forcing the insects inside to deplete the available oxygen inside the container Not only does this ultimately kill the insects, but it also reduces the level of damage they inflict as active feeding ceases below a certain threshold of oxygen

Animal agents of biological control include the parasitoid wasps that target the beetle. In laboratory trials D. basalis has eliminated the beetle. A. calandrae and U. mukerjii may also prove useful.

Freezing the whole storage area will also control C. maculatus. A period of six to 24 hours at -18 °C kills all the adults and larvae. If the cooling is slow, the beetle can acclimatize, so longer freezing is required.
