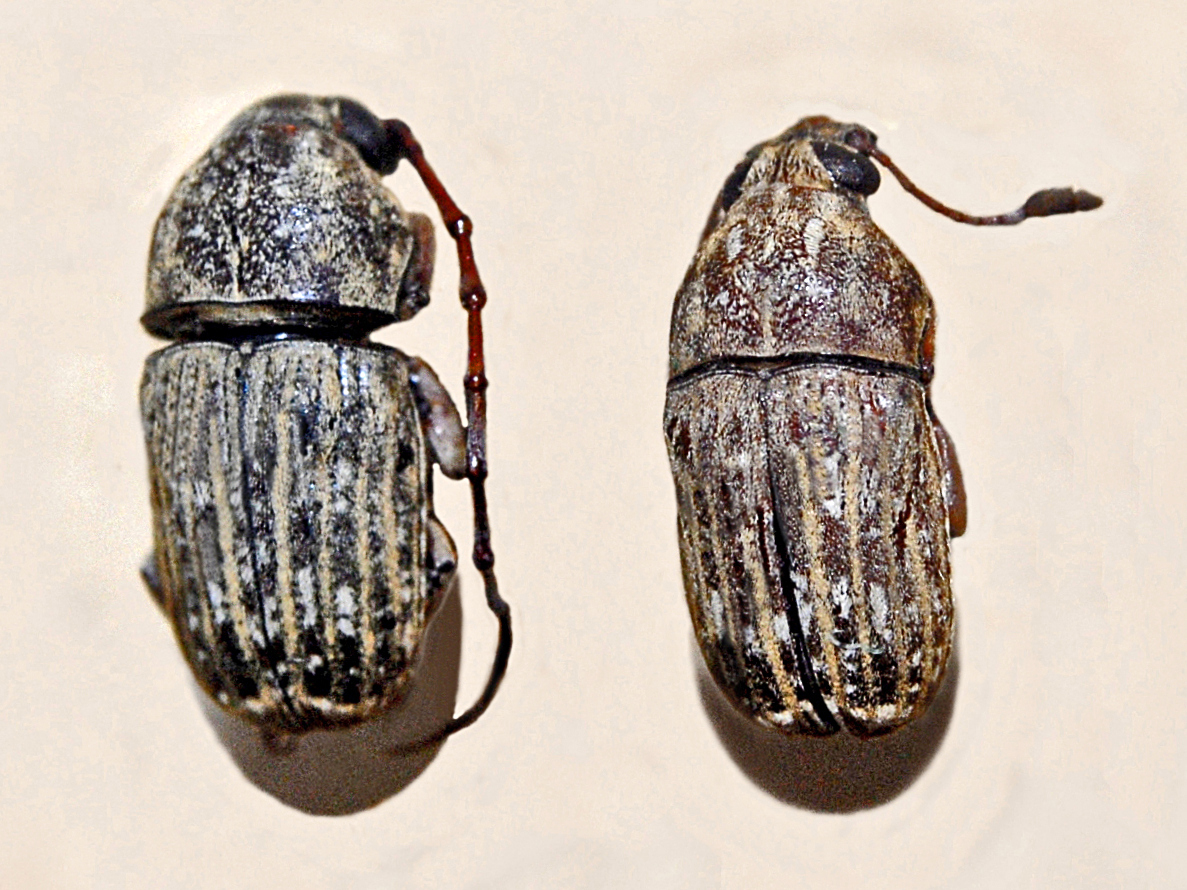
- Araecerus fasciculatus from New Guinea, male and female. Museum specimen

Scientific classification
- Kingdom: Animalia
- Phylum: Arthropoda
- Clade: Pancrustacea
- Class: Insecta
- Order: Coleoptera
- Suborder: Polyphaga
- Infraorder: Cucujiformia
- Family: Anthribidae
- Genus: Araecerus
- Species: A. fasciculatus

Binomial name
- Araecerus fasciculatus (De Geer, 1775)

Synonyms
- Amblycerus japonicus Thunberg, 1815; Anthribus alternans Germar, 1824; Anthribus coffeae Fabricius, 1801; Araecerus coffeae (Fabricius, 1801); Araecerus seminarius Chevrolat, 1871; Bruchus cacao Fabricius, 1775; Bruchus capsinicola Fabricius, 1798; Bruchus peregrinus Herbst, 1797; Cratoparis parvirostris Thomson, 1858; Curculio fasciculatus De Geer, 1775; Phloeobius griseus Stephens, 1831

= Araecerus fasciculatus =

Species of beetle

Araecerus fasciculatus, the coffee bean weevil, is a species of beetle (Coleoptera) belonging to the family Anthribidae. Despite its name, it affects a wide range of stored products and some field crops and is accredited with consuming more than 100 different kinds of stored goods. This polyphagous insect is often found in stored crops such as: corn, cassava, sweet potatoes, nutmeg, dried fruits and various nuts. Through trade it has become cosmopolitan in its distribution and is considered an economically important global pest. A. fasciculatus causes significant damage to stored food goods, can result in loss of mass quantities of product and can reduce the quality of the stored goods.

== Taxonomy ==
Significant controversies in the naming of A. fasciculatus. First coined by DeGeer in 1775 it was revised to be named Araecerus coffeae by Zimmerman. Zimmerman believed DeGeer's description and illustrations did not actually have any resemblance to the coffee bean weevil. However, the name A. fasciculatus has been restored to use for the coffee bean weevil but not without confusion regarding the numerous names associated with the beetle.

Proposed Phylogenetic tree of Weevils

- - Chrysomeloidae
  - - Cimberididae
    - - - Nemonychidae
        - Anthribidae
      - - Belidae
        - - Attelabidae
          - - Caridae
            - - Brentidae
              - Curculionidae

== Description ==
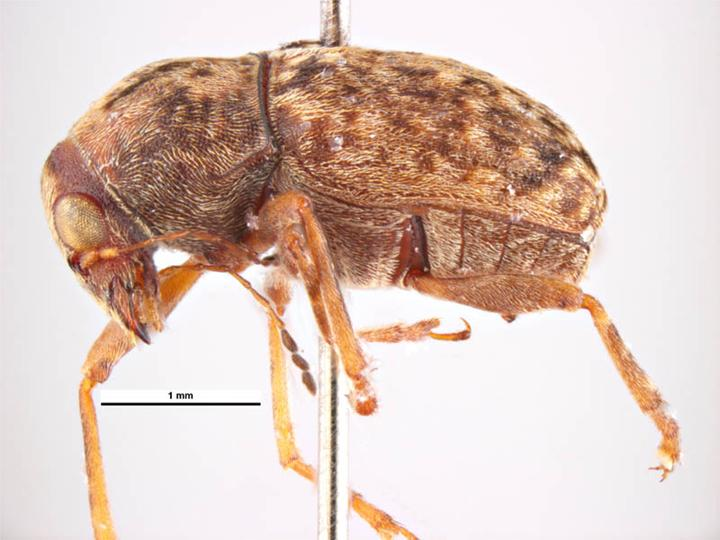

Araecerus fasciculatus can reach a length of about 3–5 millimeters. These small weevils are dome shaped, with dark-brown, and mottled with light and dark- drown pubescence. They are robust and good fliers. The antennar are slender with the 3 terminal segments of the antennae being longer and forming a club at the end.

=== Life cycle and behavior ===
Araecerus fasciculatus worldwide pest of main stored commodities, but in various scientific publications it been documented consuming living plants in their natural habitats. This list includes, coffee fruit and citrus fruit. The larvae dig tunnels into the seeds, pupate inside them, and adults emerge, boring a hole. Adult males become sexually mature 3 days after emerging, while adult females become sexually mature after 6 days. The egg incubation period last 3–15 days, averaging around 6.1 days. The pupal stage averages around 7.1 days to complete. In stored coffee beans a female can lay up to around 50 eggs with an average lifespan of 46–66 days when conditions are held at 28 °C (82 °F). The average time needed for full development from egg to an adult vary depending on the relative humidity and temperature at which development occurs.

==== Damage ====
Coffee bean weevils are rarely cause significant damage to high quality stored goods when they are stored in appropriate conditions. Contamination of goods if often a more significant problem for beans then the damaged caused by the beetle. But for other dried goods, such as cassava, there could be significant damage to the product. The damage produced by coffee bean weevils is dependent on the type of stored product, the quality of the product, the conditions at which the product is stored at, and the contamination level.

===== Coffee berries =====
Coffee bean beetle is both a pest of stored and field coffee berries. In the field infected berries can become small and black. This reduction in quality affects the market value of the coffee berries. Female beetles can oviposit up to six eggs in to the coffee berries, however it is rare that more than one will enclose. The larvae feed on the pulp or mucilage and will move on to consume the seed of the coffee bean. In Brazil small numbers of the beetles can be found on coffee plantations and there is only a reported 4.2% infestation when found in the field.

===== Tubers =====
Female A. fasciculatus beetles lay eggs on the tubers and the grubs bore inside them. The beetle larvae feed and live within the tubers and will subsequently pupate inside them. After pupation the adults bore their way to the surface. Damage is tied to tubers that have already been damaged during harvest or by other pest such as caterpillars. Coffee bean weevil damage can result in tubers being deemed unfit for consumption.

===== Citrus =====
Coffee bean weevils oviposit directing into the albedo of citrus peel. Around the oviposition sites necrotic tissue develops on the citrus. The larvae feed on the albedo, feeding will continue into inner pulp and seeds if the fruit drops from the tree and begins to dry. The outer rind of the citrus mostly stays intact and provides protection for the immature beetles. Pupal chamber are found adjacent to the out peel and once pupation occurs adults will emerage out of the fruit by chewing through the peel.

=== Habitat ===
Considered a tropical/ subtropical species, it is known to have a cosmopolitan distribution.

=== Management strategy ===
Classified as an agricultural and food pest of stored crops. They are problematical under high humidity storage conditions, the best way to manage for coffee bean weevils in storage warehouses is by maintaining an optimum temperature with a low relative humidity and moisture content. Other controls include management by fumigation in chambers with aluminum phosphide or carbon dioxide over a period of a week. Fumigation is the most widely used method. Studies have shown that sulfuryl fluoride, a popular insecticide fumigant used most often on drywood termites and bed bugs, is an effective control agent on all life stages of A. fasciculatus including the coffee bean weevil eggs which are the most tolerant of fumigants. Another fumigate widely used is phosphine. Coffee bean weevils may produce an aggregation pheromone similar to other beetles. The male produced compound, squalene, is an attractant to male and female coffee bean weevils. Aggregation pheromones are useful tools to insects as they increase the likelihood of finding a mate as well has the insects ability to find food. Pheromone based traps are a possible environmentally-friendly approach to elimating the use of harsh fumigates in food warehouses when managing for coffee bean weevils.

==== Economic threshold ====
No economic thresholds are established for A. fasciculatus in coffee or cocoa but, due to their high value, low tolerance is expected.
