= Chalcodermus =

Scientific classification
- Kingdom: Animalia
- Phylum: Arthropoda
- Class: Insecta
- Order: Coleoptera
- Suborder: Polyphaga
- Infraorder: Cucujiformia
- Family: Curculionidae
- Genus: Chalcodermus; Dejean, 1835

Genus of beetles

Chalcodermus is a genus of snout and bark beetles in the family Curculionidae. There are at least 110 described species in Chalcodermus.

== See also ==
- List of Chalcodermus species
