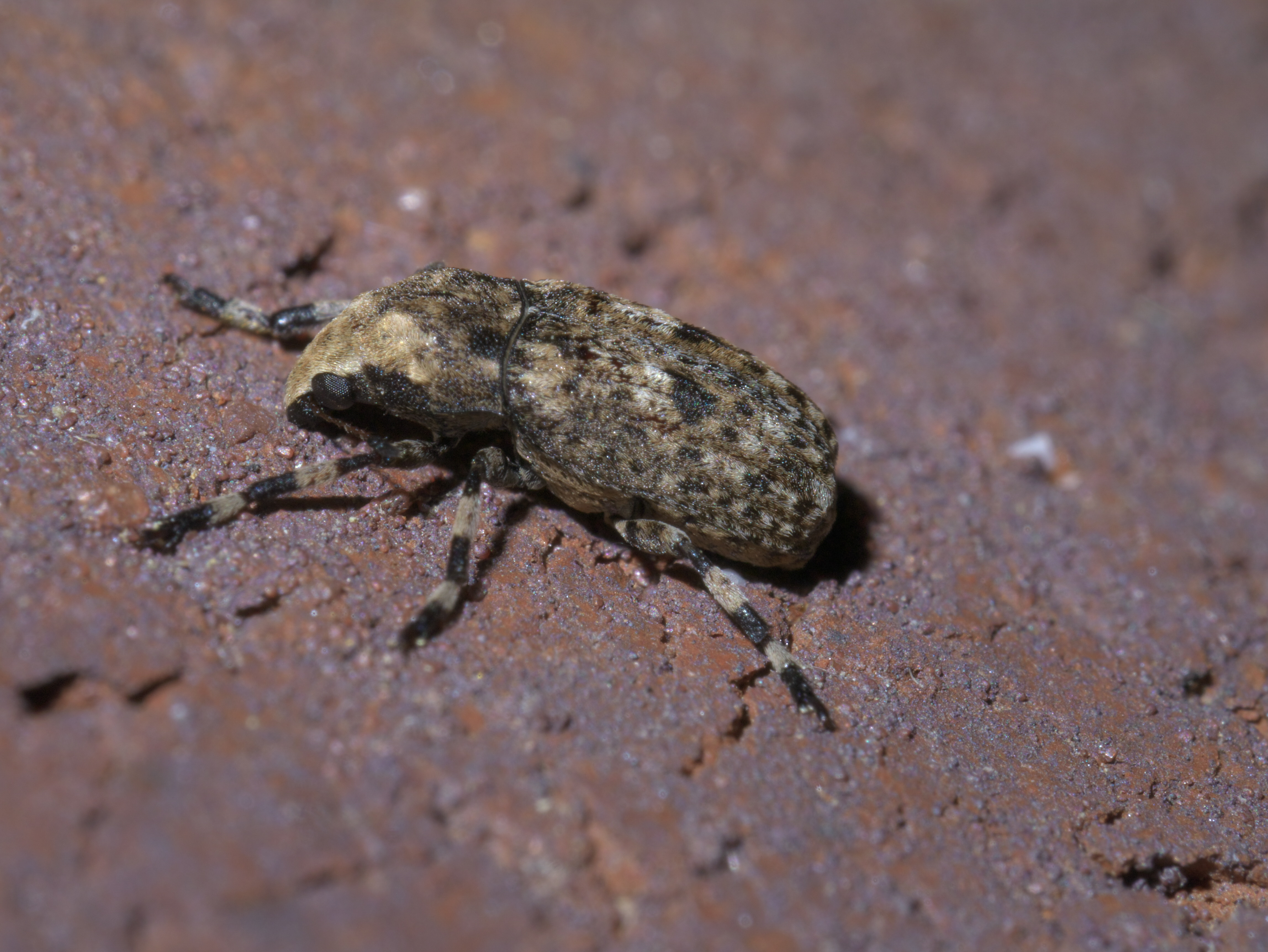

Scientific classification
- Kingdom: Animalia
- Phylum: Arthropoda
- Clade: Pancrustacea
- Class: Insecta
- Order: Coleoptera
- Suborder: Polyphaga
- Infraorder: Cucujiformia
- Superfamily: Curculionoidea
- Family: Anthribidae
- Genus: Euparius
- Species: E. marmoreus

Binomial name
- Euparius marmoreus (Olivier, 1795)

= Euparius marmoreus =

Species of beetle

Euparius marmoreus is a species of fungus weevil in the family of beetles known as Anthribidae. It is found in North America. It feeds on a variety of polyphore fungi, such as Trametes and Megasporoporia.

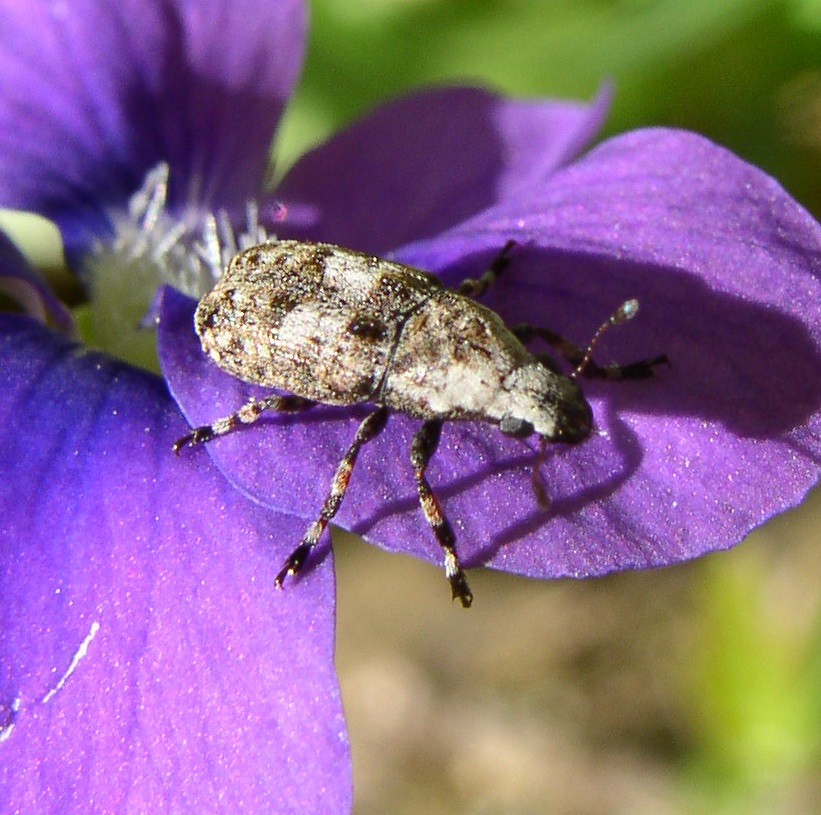

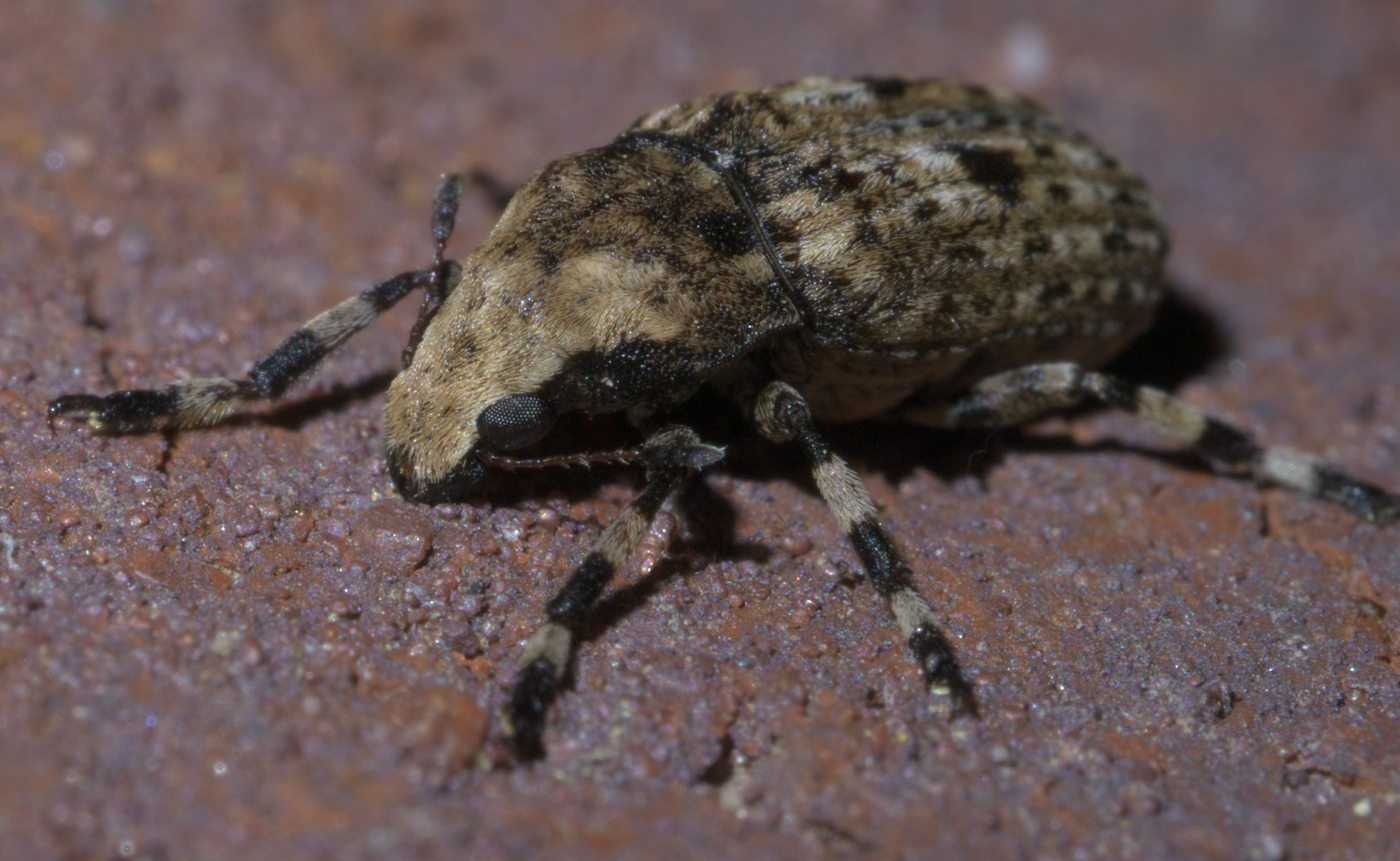
