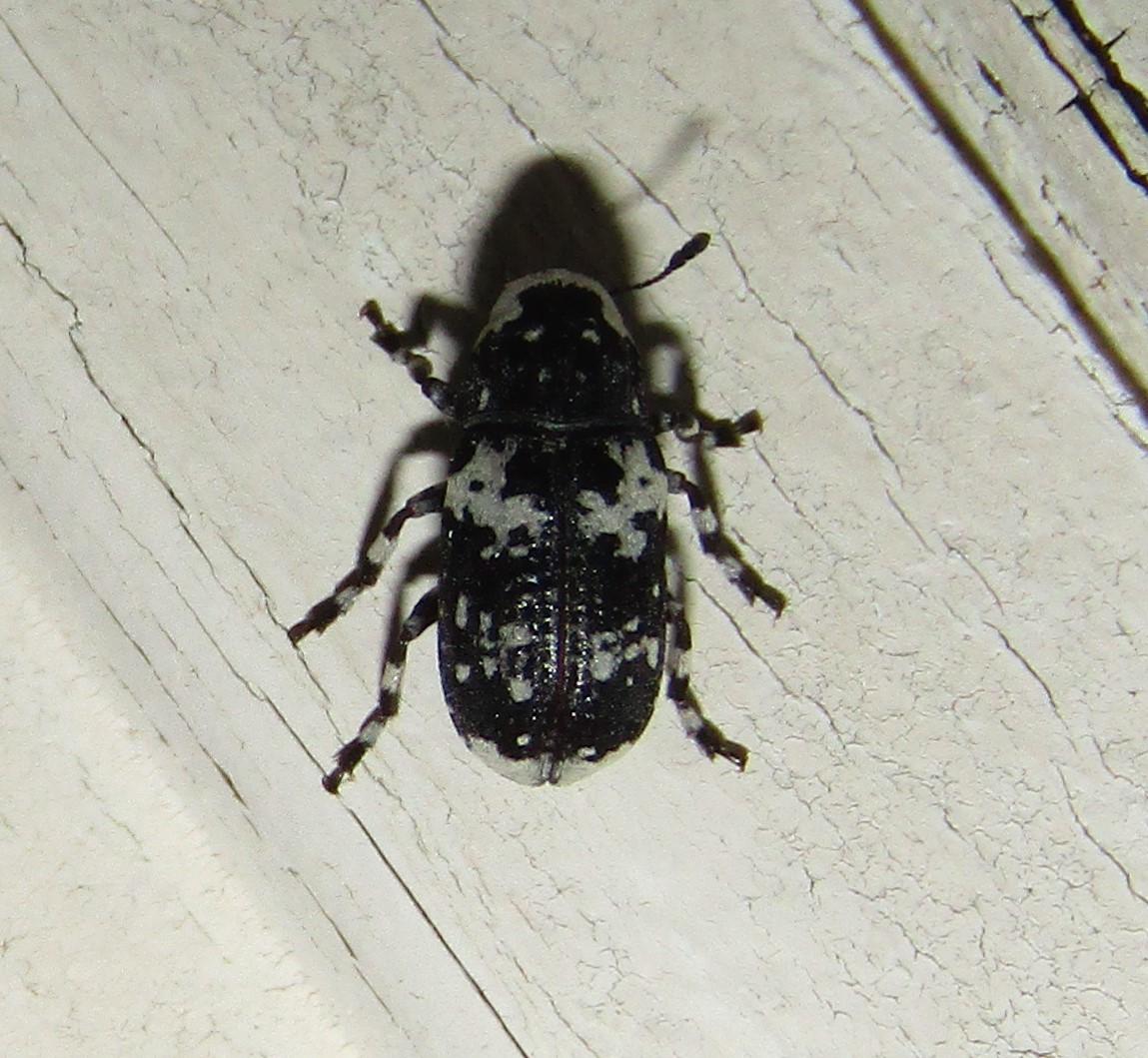

Scientific classification
- Kingdom: Animalia
- Phylum: Arthropoda
- Clade: Pancrustacea
- Class: Insecta
- Order: Coleoptera
- Suborder: Polyphaga
- Infraorder: Cucujiformia
- Superfamily: Curculionoidea
- Family: Anthribidae
- Genus: Euparius
- Species: E. lugubris

Binomial name
- Euparius lugubris (Olivier, 1795)

= Euparius lugubris =

Species of beetle

Euparius lugubris is a species of fungus weevil in the beetle family Anthribidae.
