= Euparius paganus =

Scientific classification
- Kingdom: Animalia
- Phylum: Arthropoda
- Clade: Pancrustacea
- Class: Insecta
- Order: Coleoptera
- Suborder: Polyphaga
- Infraorder: Cucujiformia
- Superfamily: Curculionoidea
- Family: Anthribidae
- Subfamily: Anthribinae
- Tribe: Cratoparini
- Genus: Euparius
- Species: E. paganus

Binomial name
- Euparius paganus Gyllenhal, 1833

Species of beetle

Euparius paganus is a species of fungus weevil in the family Anthribidae. It is found in North America.
