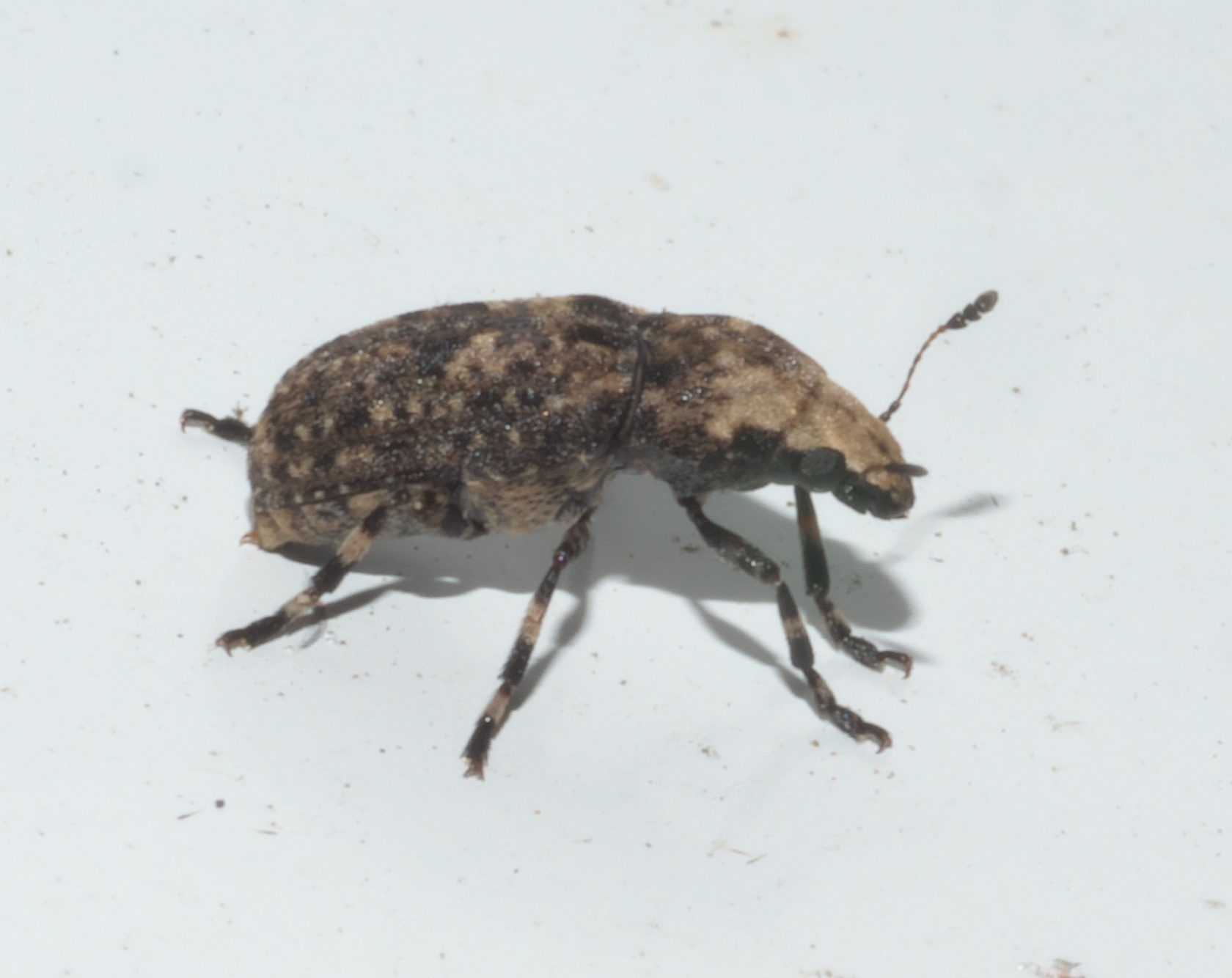
- Euparius marmoreus, Oklahoma

Scientific classification
- Domain: Eukaryota
- Kingdom: Animalia
- Phylum: Arthropoda
- Class: Insecta
- Order: Coleoptera
- Suborder: Polyphaga
- Infraorder: Cucujiformia
- Family: Anthribidae
- Tribe: Cratoparini
- Genus: Euparius; Schoenherr, C.J., 1823

Synonyms
- Cratoparis Schönherr, 1839

= Euparius =

Genus of beetles

Euparius is a genus of Fungus Weevils in the beetle family Anthribidae. There are more than 70 described species in Euparius, found in the Americas, Asia, Australia, and Africa.

== Species ==
These 79 species belong to the genus Euparius:

- Euparius ajax Jekel, 1855
- Euparius albiceps Jordan, 1904
- Euparius albicornis (Germar, E.F., 1823)
- Euparius albifrons Boheman, 1829
- Euparius amictus Jordan, 1937
- Euparius anceps Jordan, 1937
- Euparius annulipes Jordan, 1924
- Euparius apicalis Fahraeus in Schonherr, 1839
- Euparius apicicornis Gemminger & Harold, 1872
- Euparius boninensis Morimoto, 1978
- Euparius bruchi Jordan, 1937
- Euparius brunnipennis (Motschulsky, 1863)
- Euparius calcaratus Jordan, 1904
- Euparius callosus Gyllenhal in Schoenherr, 1833
- Euparius centromaculatus Gyllenhal, 1833
- Euparius ceroderes Boheman in Schoenherr, 1845
- Euparius championi Jordan, 1906
- Euparius cinctipes Gyllenhal in Schoenherr, 1833
- Euparius clitelliger Fahraeus in Schonherr, 1839
- Euparius coelebs Jordan, 1906
- Euparius concolor Morimoto, 1978
- Euparius consors Jordan, 1904
- Euparius coronatus Gyllenhal, 1833
- Euparius dermestinus Jordan, 1906
- Euparius didymus Zimmerman, 1994
- Euparius dipholis Jordan, 1937
- Euparius disconotatus (Jordan, 1895)
- Euparius dispar Gyllenhal, 1833
- Euparius dorsalis Boheman in Schoenherr, 1833
- Euparius equestris Fahraeus in Schonherr, 1839
- Euparius ferruginosus Motschulsky, 1874
- Euparius formosanus (Jordan, 1912)
- Euparius frenatus Jordan, 1906
- Euparius hypsideres Jordan, 1904
- Euparius koltzei (Reitter, 1895)
- Euparius lateralis (Jordan, 1924)
- Euparius lateripictus (Jordan, 1895)
- Euparius leopardus Jekel, 1855
- Euparius lignarius Gemminger & Harold, 1872
- Euparius longiclava Jordan, 1937
- Euparius lugubris (Olivier, A.G., 1800)
- Euparius luridus Fahraeus in Schonherr, 1839
- Euparius marmoreus (Olivier, A.G., 1800)
- Euparius medialis Jordan, 1937
- Euparius mesculus Jordan, 1937
- Euparius molitor Jordan, 1904
- Euparius nigritarsis Jordan, 1904
- Euparius nodosus Jordan, 1904
- Euparius notatus Say, 1827
- Euparius nuchalis Jordan, 1937
- Euparius obesus Jordan, 1904
- Euparius ochrus Jordan, 1906
- Euparius oculatus (Sharp, 1891)
- Euparius paganus Gyllenhal in Schoenherr, 1833
- Euparius pardalis Jekel, 1855
- Euparius parvulus Jordan, 1904
- Euparius patruelis Frieser, R., 2001
- Euparius peruanus Brethes, 1920
- Euparius placidus Jordan, 1937
- Euparius polius Jordan, 1904
- Euparius quagga Jordan, 1904
- Euparius rufus Jordan, 1904
- Euparius sallei Jekel, 1855
- Euparius sellatus Fahraeus in Schonherr, 1839
- Euparius similis Jordan, 1904
- Euparius stratus Jordan, 1937
- Euparius submaculatus Boheman, 1833
- Euparius subtessellatus Schaffer, 1906
- Euparius suturalis Jordan, 1904
- Euparius suturellus Wolfrum, 1929
- Euparius tamui Nakane, 1963
- Euparius tapirus Imhoff, 1842
- Euparius tarsalis Fahraeus in Schonherr, 1839
- Euparius tessellatus
- Euparius thoracicus Fahraeus, 1839
- Euparius tigris Gyllenhal, 1833
- Euparius torquatus Jekel, 1855
- Euparius yaeyamanus Morimoto, 1978
- Euparius zebra Boheman, 1833
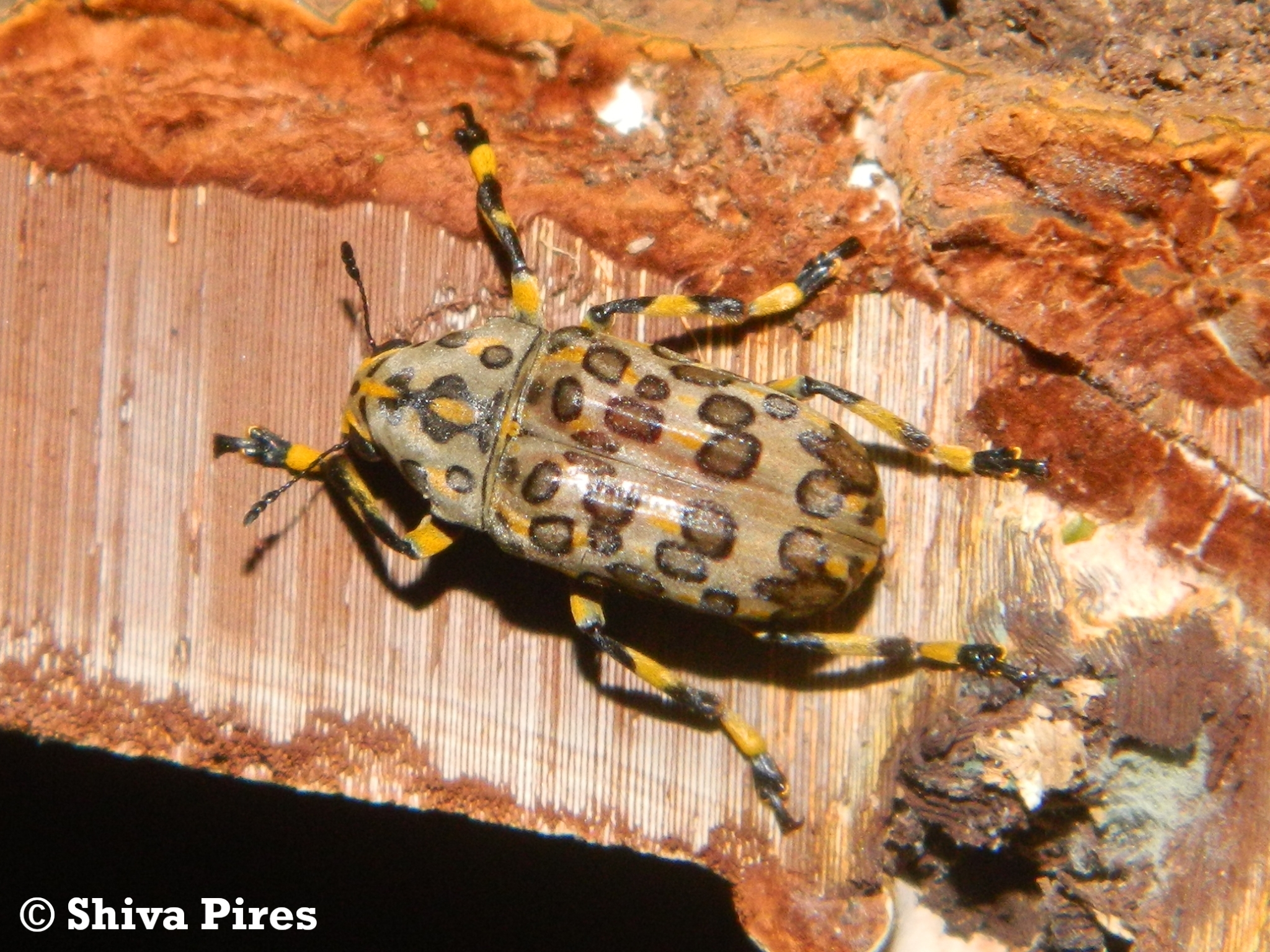
Euparius tapirus, Brazil

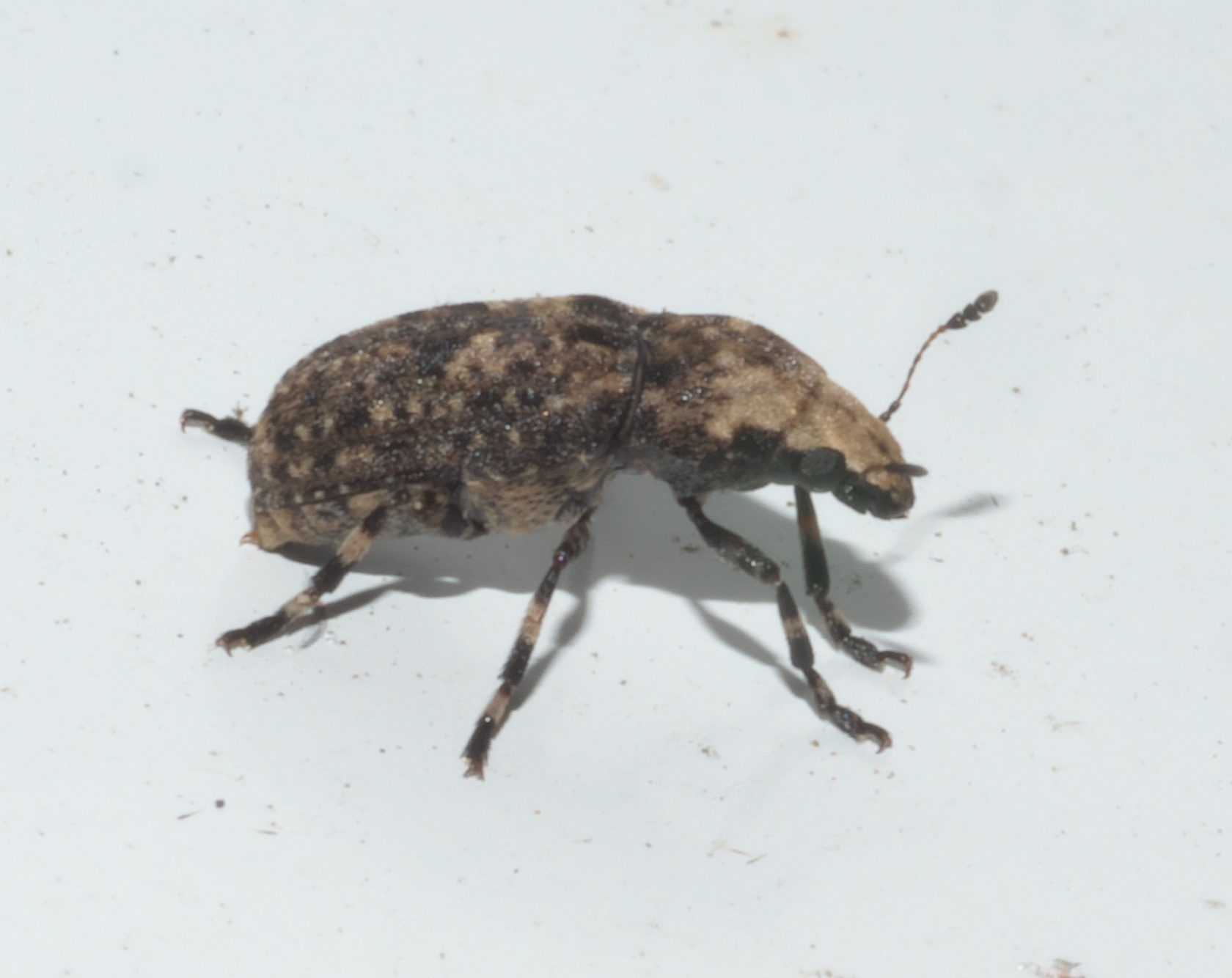
Euparius marmoreus, Oklahoma

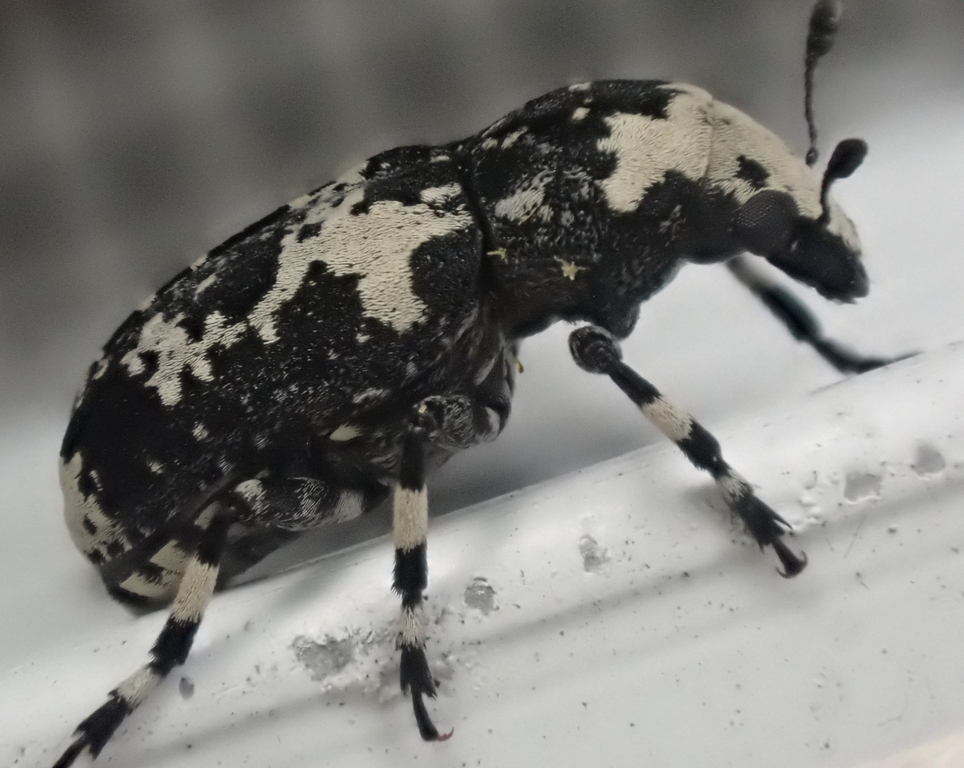
Euparius lugubris, Tennessee

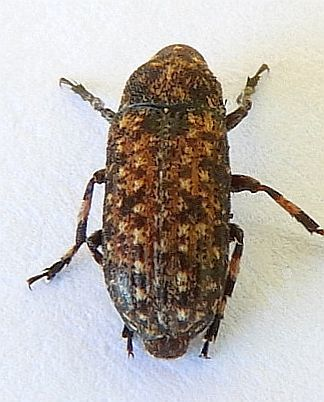
Euparius subtesselatus, Arizona

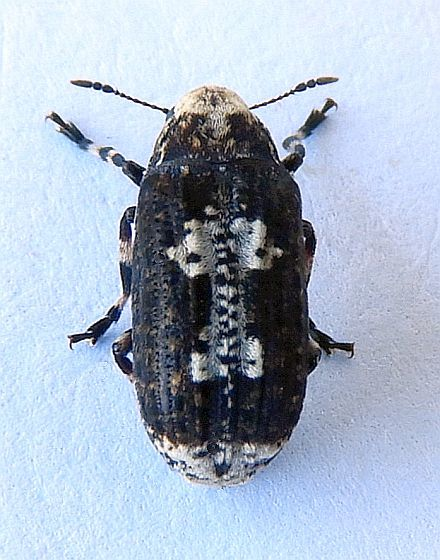
Euparius pictus, Arizona

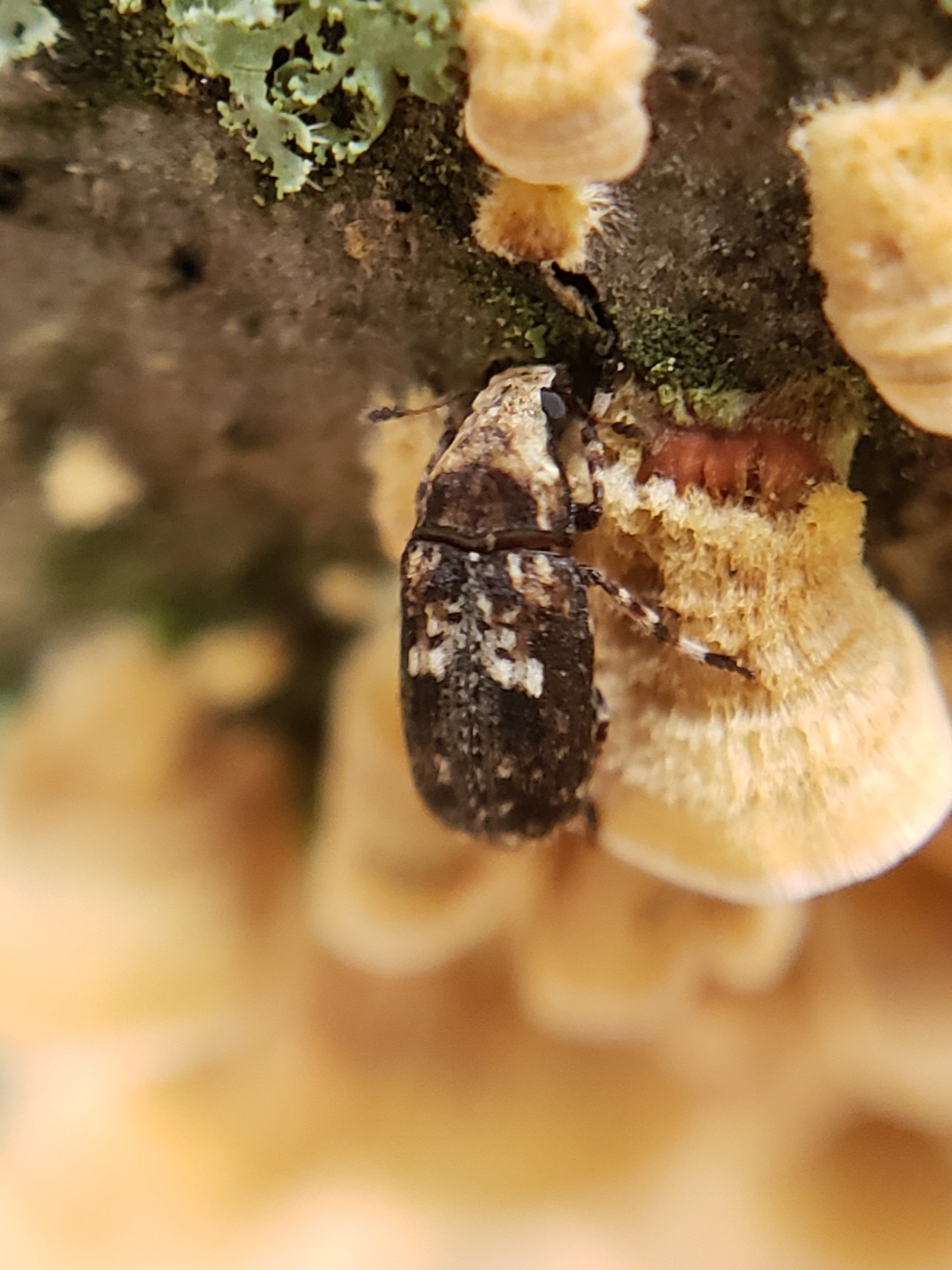
Euparius paganus, Delaware

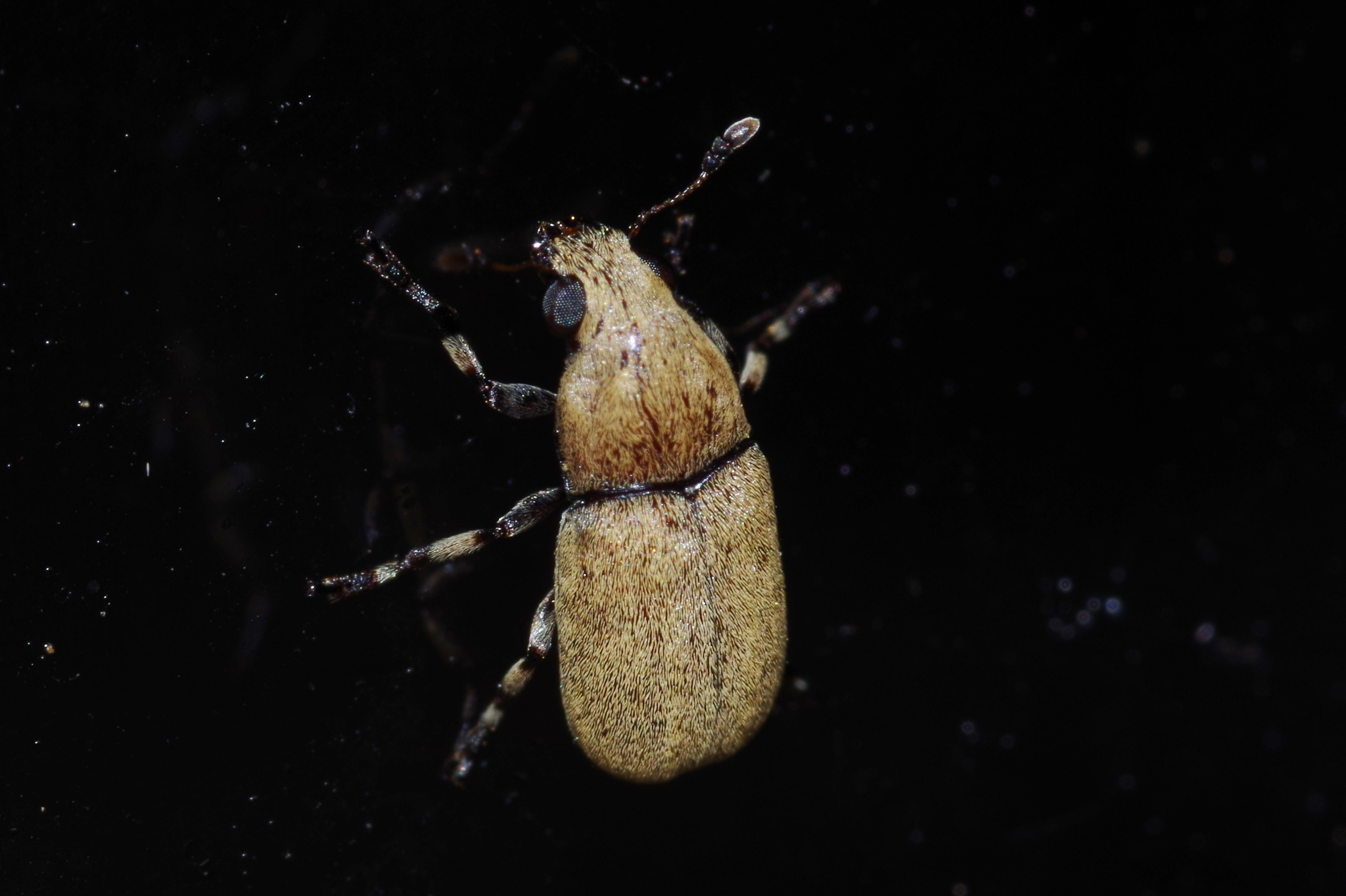
Euparius concolor, Japan

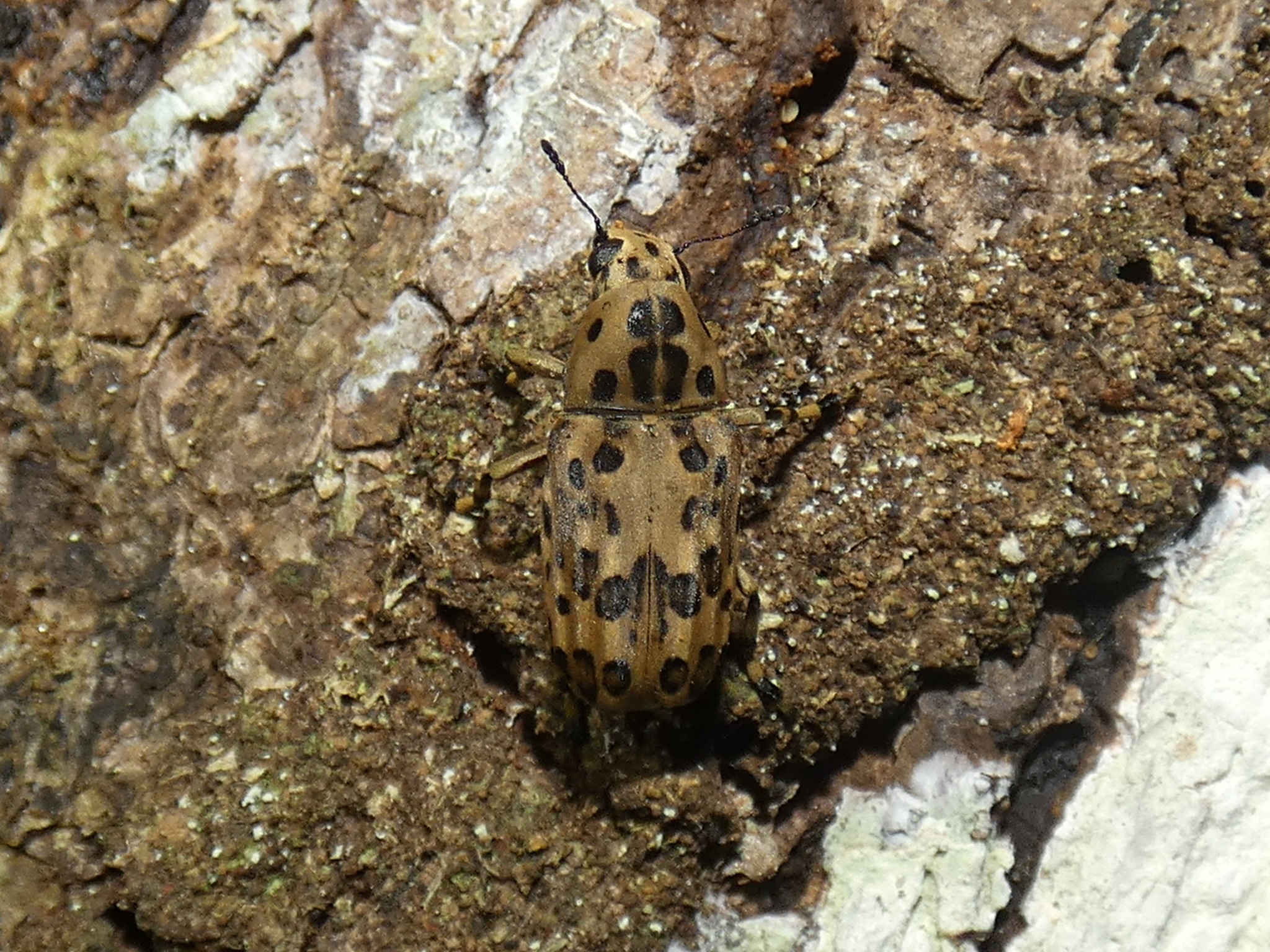
Euparius polius, Panamá
