= Eurymycter =

Scientific classification
- Kingdom: Animalia
- Phylum: Arthropoda
- Class: Insecta
- Order: Coleoptera
- Suborder: Polyphaga
- Infraorder: Cucujiformia
- Family: Anthribidae
- Tribe: Tropiderini
- Genus: Eurymycter; LeConte, 1876

Genus of beetles

Eurymycter is a genus of fungus weevils in the beetle family Anthribidae. There are at least four described species in Eurymycter.

== Species ==
These four species belong to the genus Eurymycter:

- Eurymycter bicarinatus Pierce, 1930
- Eurymycter fasciatus (Olivier, 1795)
- Eurymycter latifascia Pierce, 1930
- Eurymycter tricarinatus Pierce, 1930
