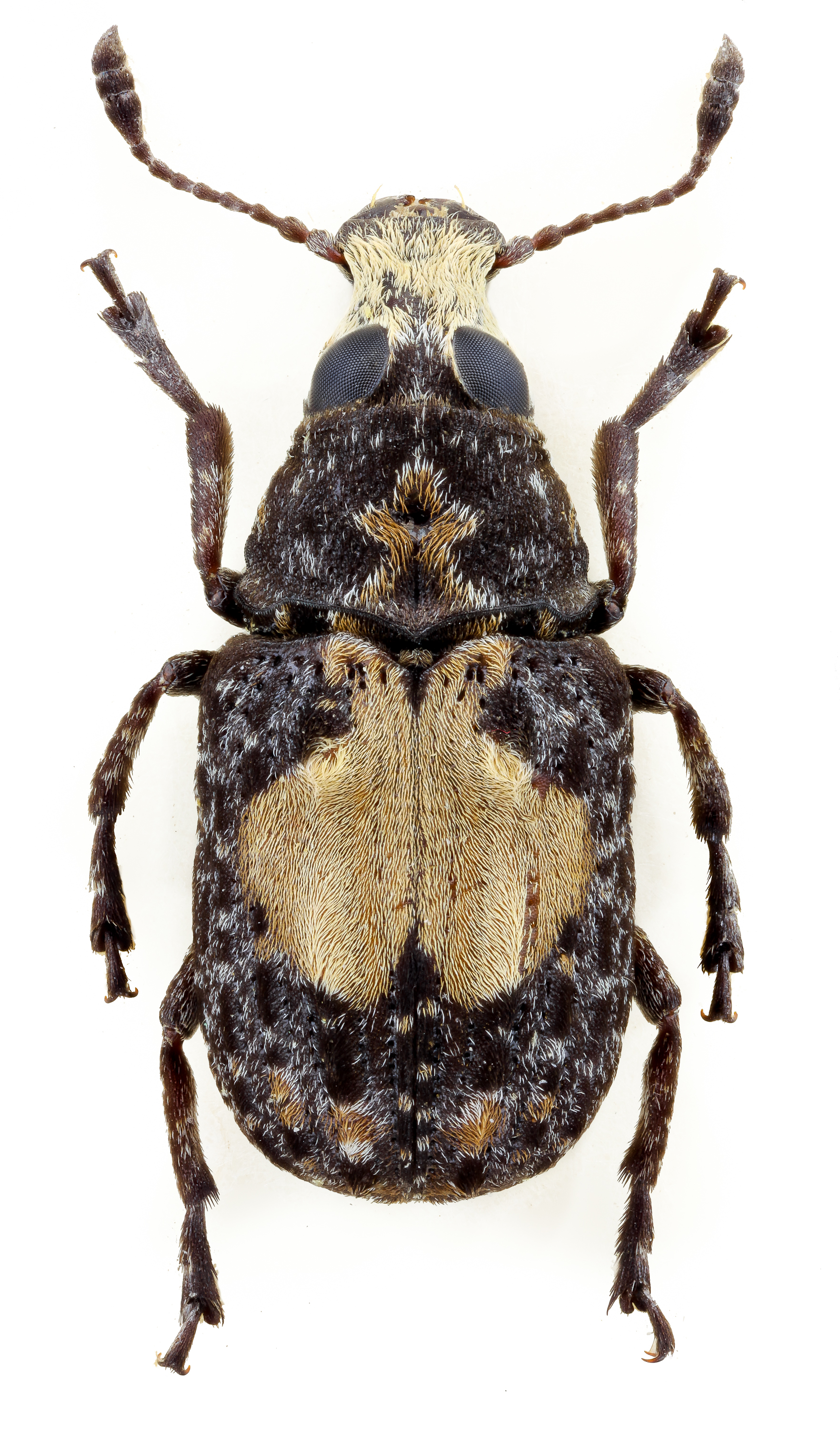
- Gonotropis dorsalis

Scientific classification
- Domain: Eukaryota
- Kingdom: Animalia
- Phylum: Arthropoda
- Class: Insecta
- Order: Coleoptera
- Suborder: Polyphaga
- Infraorder: Cucujiformia
- Family: Anthribidae
- Subfamily: Anthribinae
- Tribe: Tropiderini; Lacordaire, 1866

= Tropiderini =

Tribe of beetles

Tropiderini is a tribe of fungus weevils in the family of beetles known as Anthribidae. There are at least two genera and about five described species in Tropiderini.

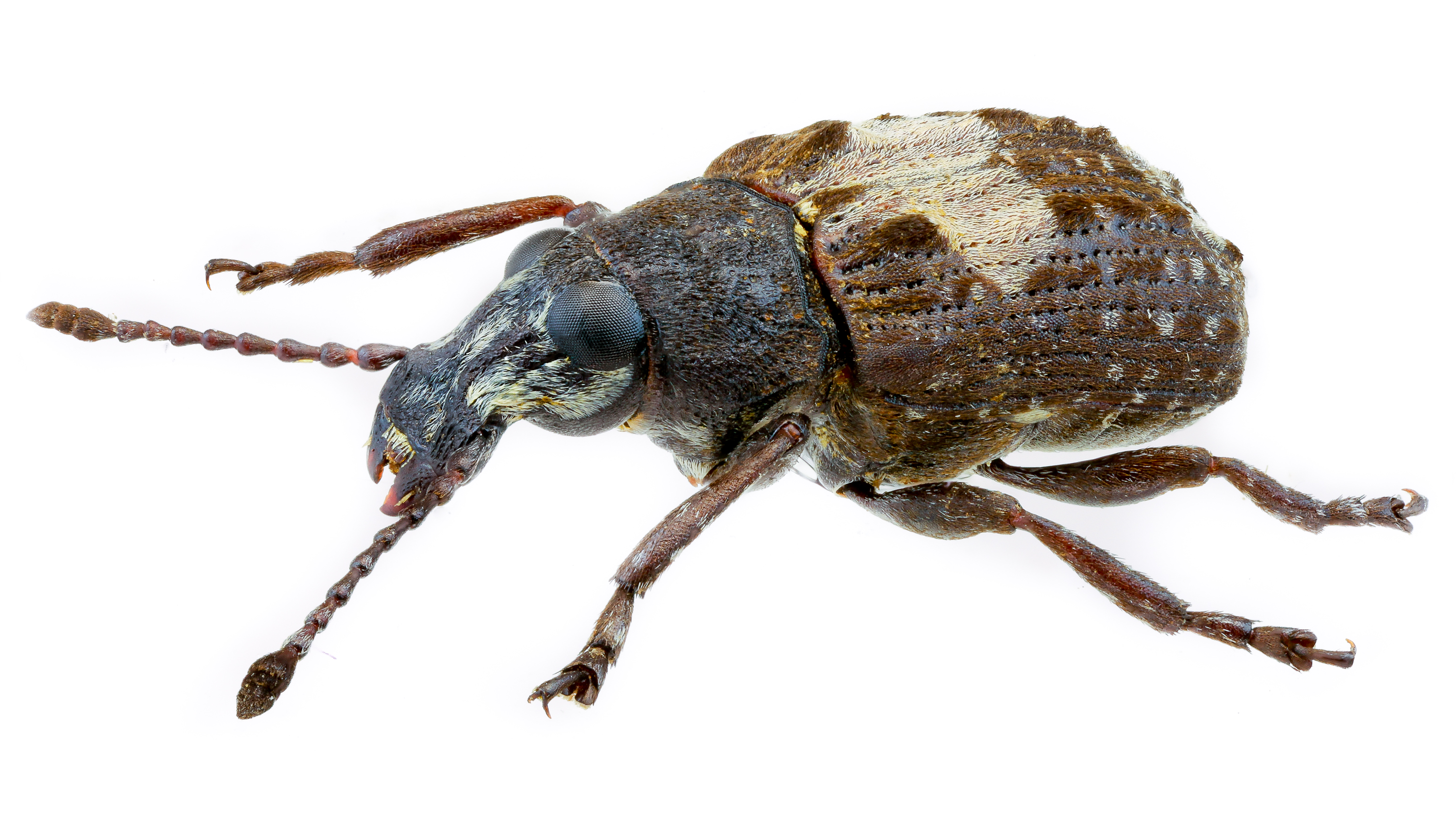
Gonotropis dorsalis

== Genera ==
These two genera belong to the tribe Tropiderini:

- Eurymycter LeConte, 1876^{i c g b}
- Gonotropis LeConte, 1876^{i c g b}

Data sources: i = ITIS, c = Catalogue of Life, g = GBIF, b = Bugguide.net
