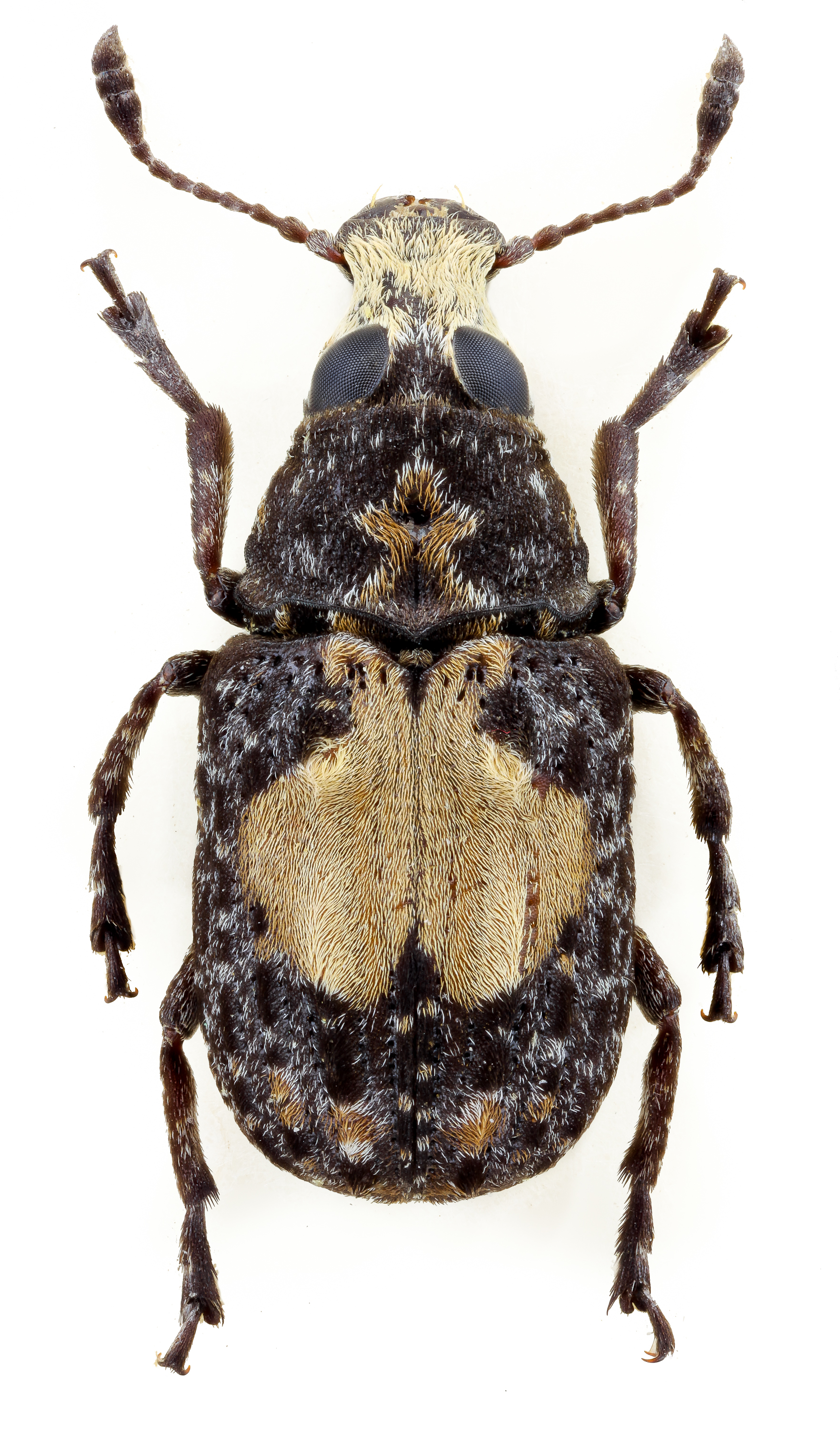
- Gonotropis dorsalis

Scientific classification
- Kingdom: Animalia
- Phylum: Arthropoda
- Clade: Pancrustacea
- Class: Insecta
- Order: Coleoptera
- Suborder: Polyphaga
- Infraorder: Cucujiformia
- Superfamily: Curculionoidea
- Family: Anthribidae
- Tribe: Tropiderini
- Genus: Gonotropis; LeConte, 1876

= Gonotropis =

Genus of beetles

Gonotropis is a genus of fungus weevils in the family of beetles known as Anthribidae. There are about five described species in Gonotropis.

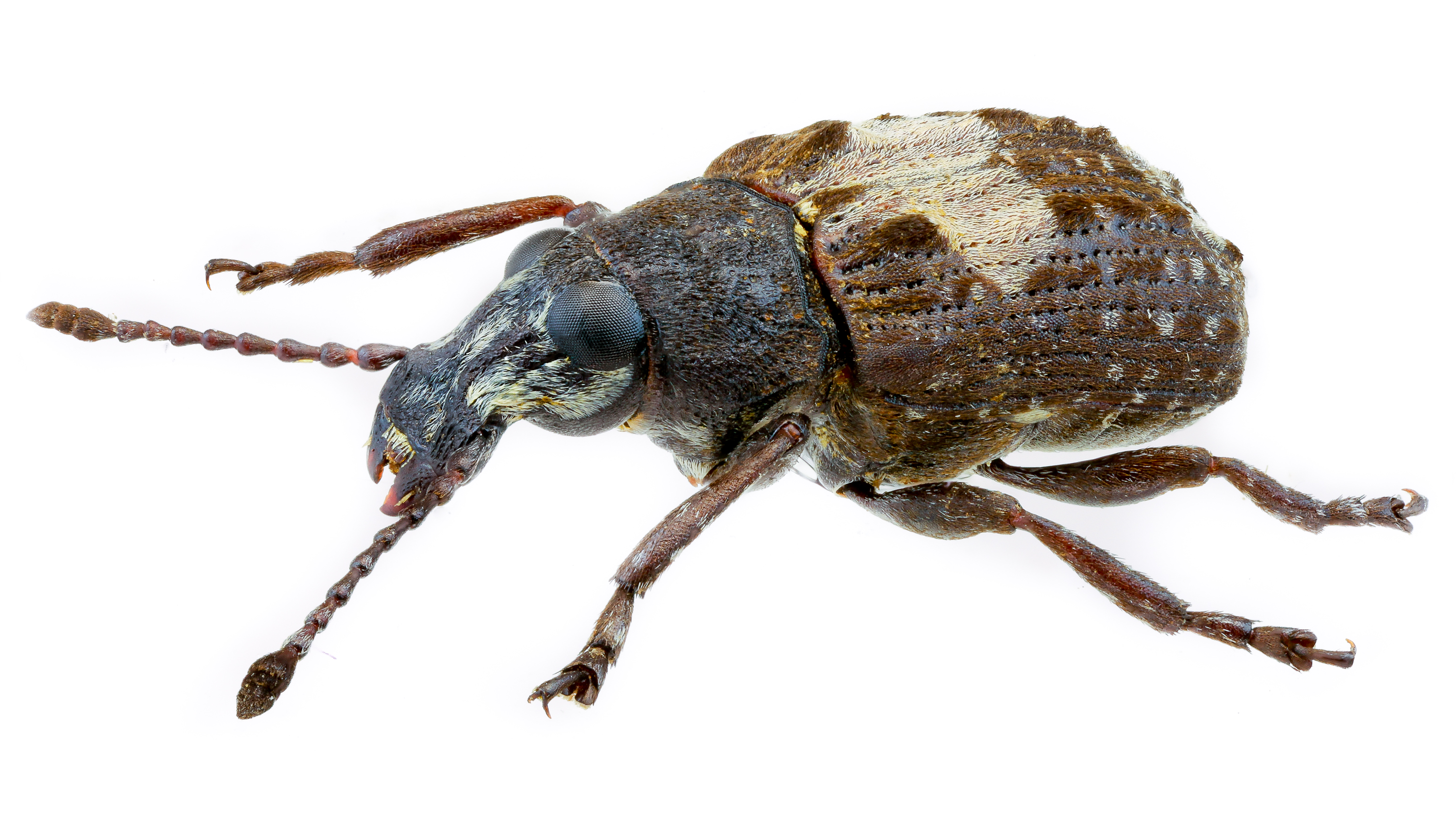
Gonotropis dorsalis

== Species ==
These five species belong to the genus Gonotropis:

- Gonotropis crassicornis Oda, 1979^{c}
- Gonotropis dorsalis (Thunberg, 1796)^{c g b}
- Gonotropis gibbosa Leconte, 1876^{c g}
- Gonotropis gibbosus LeConte, 1876^{i}
- Gonotropis murakamii Oda, 1979^{c}

Data sources: i = ITIS, c = Catalogue of Life, g = GBIF, b = Bugguide.net
