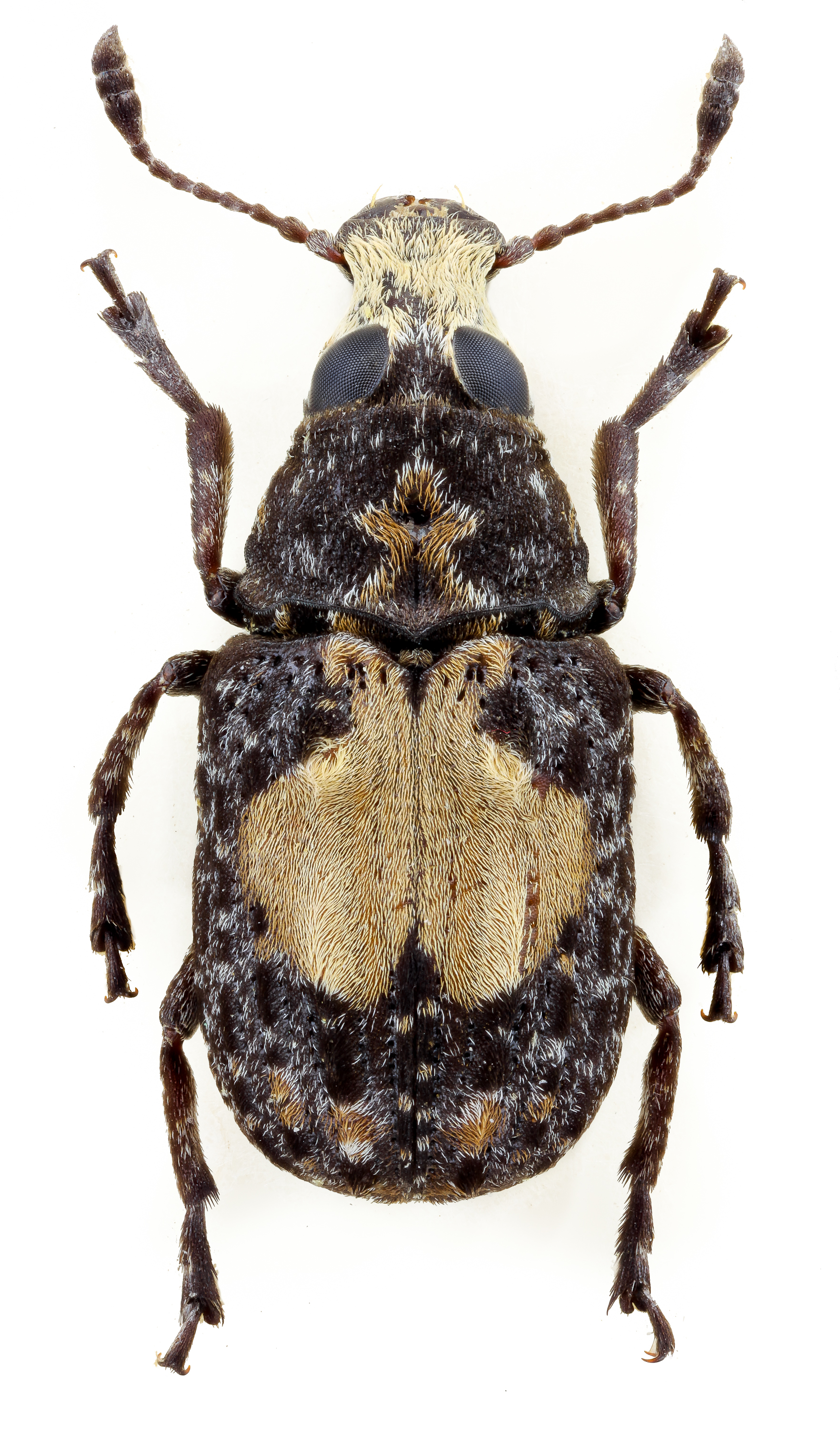

Scientific classification
- Kingdom: Animalia
- Phylum: Arthropoda
- Clade: Pancrustacea
- Class: Insecta
- Order: Coleoptera
- Suborder: Polyphaga
- Infraorder: Cucujiformia
- Superfamily: Curculionoidea
- Family: Anthribidae
- Genus: Gonotropis
- Species: G. dorsalis

Binomial name
- Gonotropis dorsalis (Thunberg, 1796)

= Gonotropis dorsalis =

Species of beetle

Gonotropis dorsalis is a species of fungus weevil in the family of beetles known as Anthribidae.

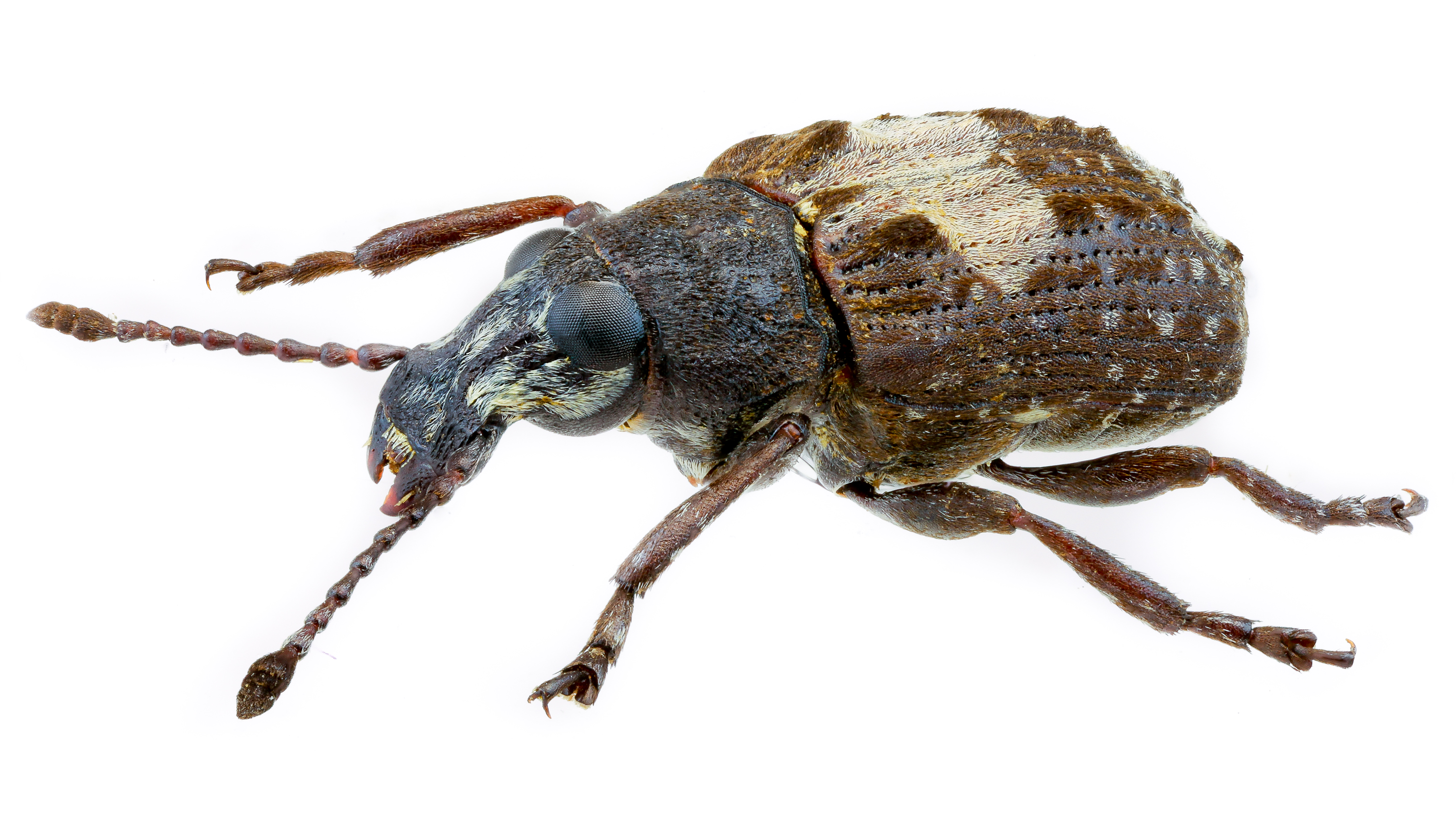
