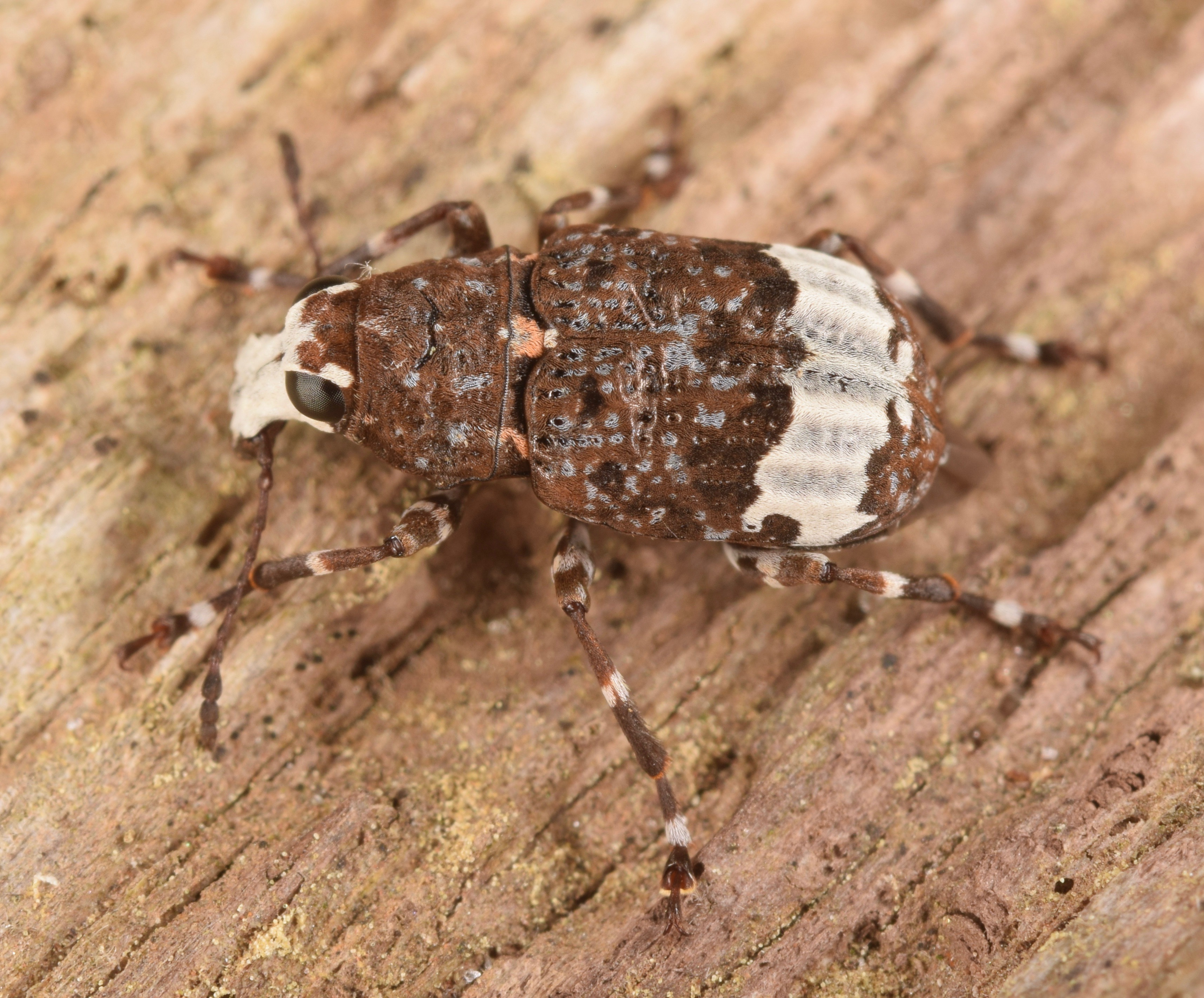

Scientific classification
- Kingdom: Animalia
- Phylum: Arthropoda
- Clade: Pancrustacea
- Class: Insecta
- Order: Coleoptera
- Suborder: Polyphaga
- Infraorder: Cucujiformia
- Superfamily: Curculionoidea
- Family: Anthribidae
- Genus: Eurymycter
- Species: E. fasciatus

Binomial name
- Eurymycter fasciatus (Olivier, 1795)

= Eurymycter fasciatus =

Species of beetle

Eurymycter fasciatus is a species of fungus weevil in the beetle family Anthribidae.
