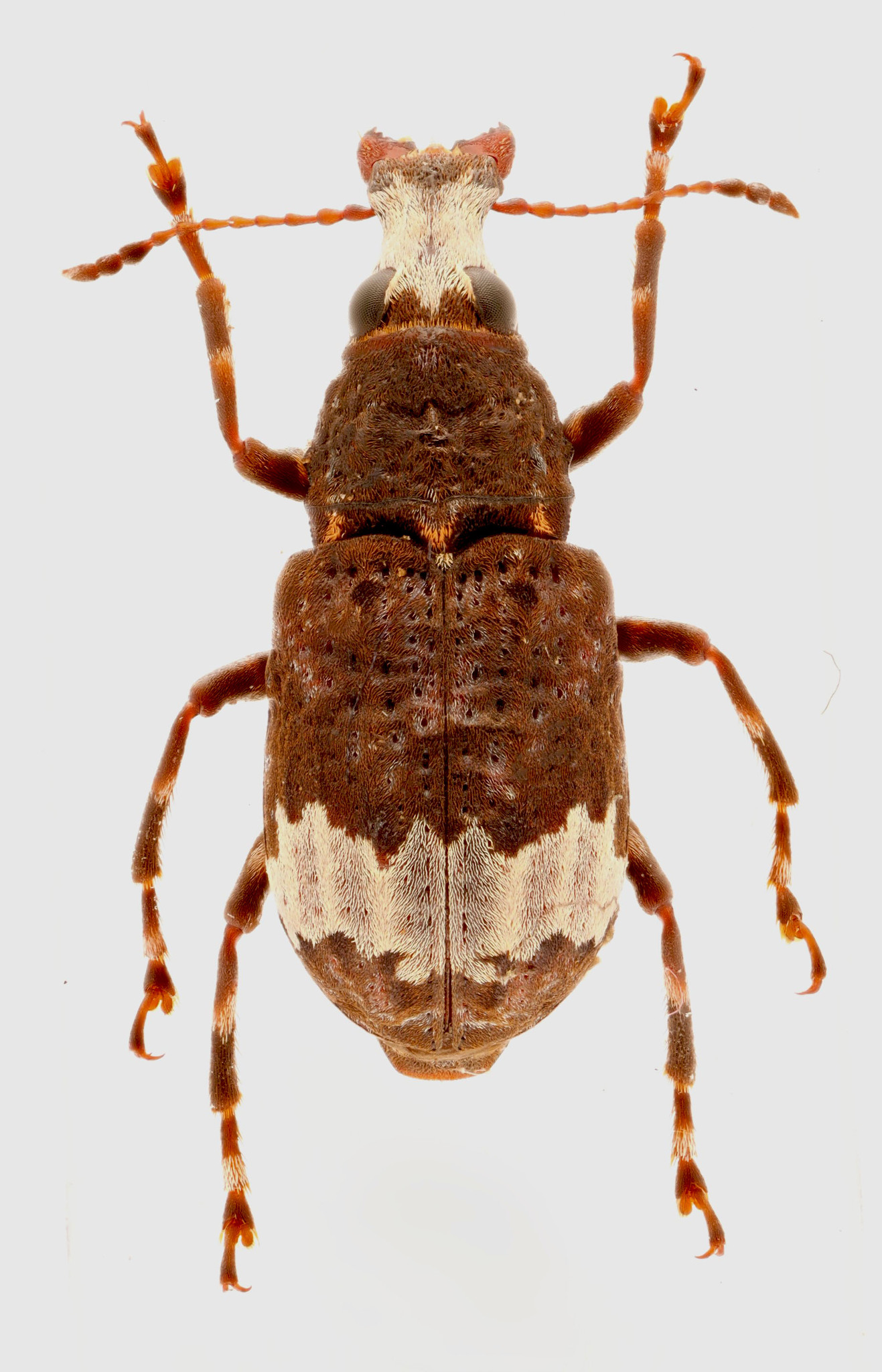
- Eurymycter tricarinatus

Scientific classification
- Domain: Eukaryota
- Kingdom: Animalia
- Phylum: Arthropoda
- Class: Insecta
- Order: Coleoptera
- Suborder: Polyphaga
- Infraorder: Cucujiformia
- Family: Anthribidae
- Genus: Eurymycter
- Species: E. tricarinatus

Binomial name
- Eurymycter tricarinatus Pierce, 1930

= Eurymycter tricarinatus =

Species of beetle

Eurymycter tricarinatus is a species of fungus weevil in the beetle family Anthribidae. It is found in North America.
