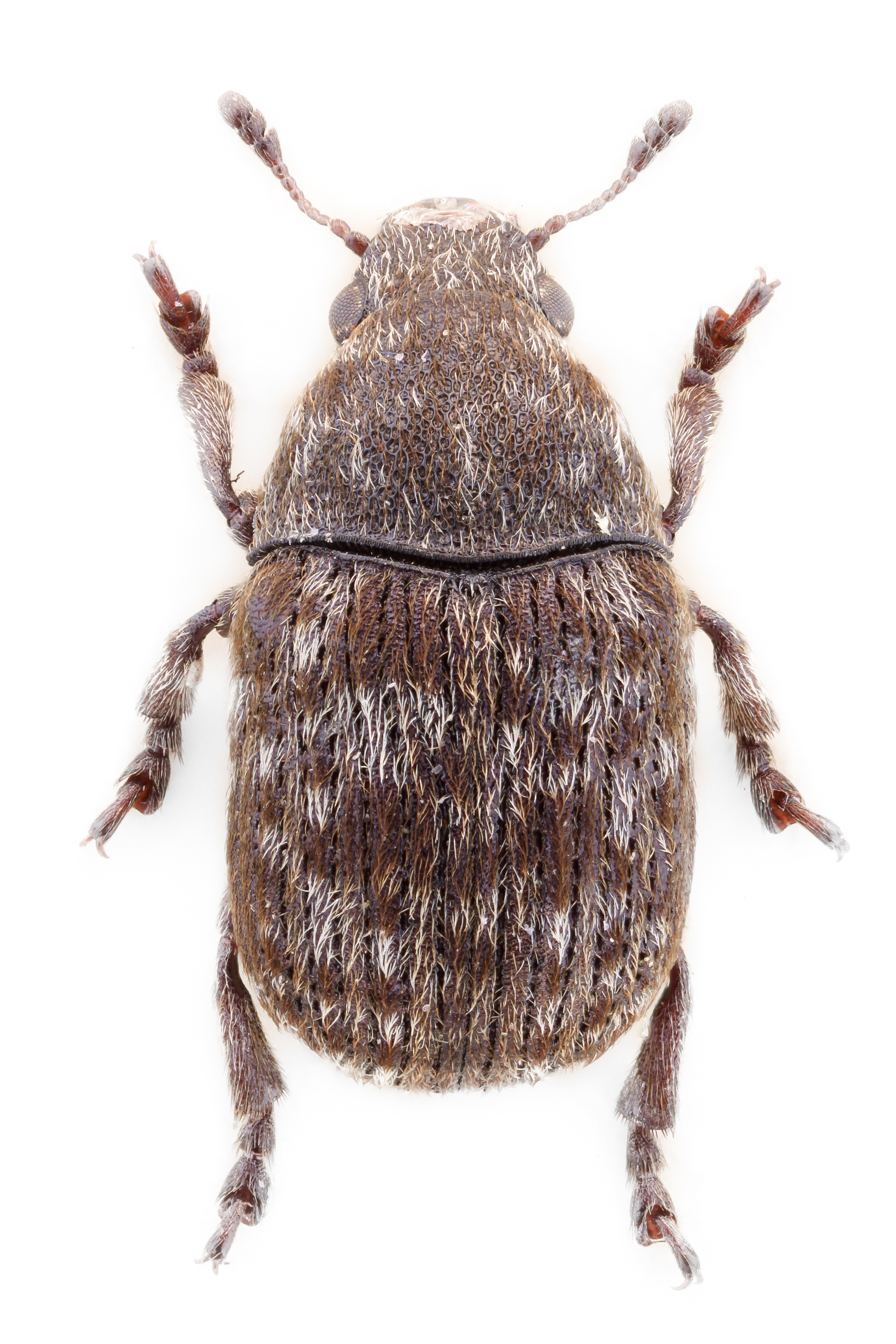
- Anthribus nebulosus

Scientific classification
- Kingdom: Animalia
- Phylum: Arthropoda
- Class: Insecta
- Order: Coleoptera
- Suborder: Polyphaga
- Infraorder: Cucujiformia
- Family: Anthribidae
- Subfamily: Anthribinae
- Genus: Anthribus; Geoffroy, 1762

Synonyms
- List: Anthibus LeConte, 1876; Anthotribus Hoffmann, 1803; Antribus Fourcroy, 1785; Antribus Illiger, 1801; Antriptus Illiger, 1801; Paropes Germar, 1829; Pseudobrachtarsus Pierce, 1930; Pseudobrachytarsus Pierce, 1930

= Anthribus =

Genus of beetles

Anthribus is a genus of fungus weevils in the family Anthribidae.

== Species ==
The following species are recognised in the genus Anthribus:

- Anthribus adspersus Sturm, 1826
- Anthribus aesaloides Cristofori & Jan, 1832
- Anthribus albiceps Broun, 1914
- Anthribus albifrons Boheman, 1829
- Anthribus albiguttatus Fåhraeus, 1839
- Anthribus albinus Wolfrum, 1953
- Anthribus albocinctus Fåhraeus, 1839
- Anthribus altus Sharp, 1876
- Anthribus anguliceps Broun, 1910
- Anthribus arciferus Blanchard, 1853
- Anthribus atomus Sharp, 1876
- Anthribus aucklandicus Brookes, 1951
- Anthribus bidens Schoenherr, 1833
- Anthribus bimaculatus Schoenherr, 1833
- Anthribus bisignatus Sturm, 1826
- Anthribus bispinus Erichson, 1842
- Anthribus brouni Sharp, 1876
- Anthribus bullatus Sharp, 1876
- Anthribus cervinus Klug, 1834
- Anthribus cilius Jordan, 1914
- Anthribus clopi Chobaut, 1922
- Anthribus confusus Gyllenhal, 1833
- Anthribus cordiger Fåhraeus, 1839
- Anthribus cornutellus Broun, 1913
- Anthribus coronatus Dejean
- Anthribus costatus Schoenherr, 1826
- Anthribus crassus Sharp, 1876
- Anthribus cristatelus Broun, 1911
- Anthribus cylindricollis Schoenherr, 1817
- Anthribus daimio Sharp, 1891
- Anthribus dama Labram & Imhoff, 1840
- Anthribus desertus Wolfrum, 1953
- Anthribus discedens Sharp, 1876
- Anthribus discifer F.P.Schrank, 1798
- Anthribus dispar Dejean
- Anthribus ephippiger J.Gistl, 1831
- Anthribus fasciatus J.R.Forster, 1770
- Anthribus fascicularis Schoenherr, 1833
- Anthribus ferrugatus Klug, 1833
- Anthribus ferrugineus Fåhraeus, 1839
- Anthribus flagellatus De Haan
- Anthribus flavipilus Broun, 1895
- Anthribus flavitarsis Sturm, 1826
- Anthribus frenatus Klug, 1833
- Anthribus frontalis Wolfrum, 1953
- Anthribus funebris Klug, 1833
- Anthribus garnotii Guérin-Méneville, 1833
- Anthribus glaber O.F.Mueller, 1776
- Anthribus griseomaculatus Sturm, 1826
- Anthribus griseus Fabricius, 1792
- Anthribus griseus Stephens, 1834
- Anthribus halli Broun, 1921
- Anthribus haplosoma Jordan, 1914
- Anthribus heros Fabricius, 1801
- Anthribus hetaera Sharp, 1876
- Anthribus huttoni Sharp, 1876
- Anthribus imitarius Broun, 1914
- Anthribus imperialis Sturm, 1826
- Anthribus incertus White, 1846
- Anthribus inflatus Sharp, 1876
- Anthribus japonicus Schoenherr, 1833
- Anthribus lajievorus Chao, 1976
- Anthribus leucostictus Klug, 1833
- Anthribus levinensis Broun, 1913
- Anthribus lugubris Sturm, 1826
- Anthribus macrocerus Wolfrum, 1953
- Anthribus malaicus Wolfrum, 1953
- Anthribus marmoreus Sturm, 1826
- Anthribus maurus Broun, 1910
- Anthribus meinertzhageni Broun, 1880
- Anthribus moussonii
- Anthribus murinus Schoenherr, 1833
- Anthribus nanus Sharp, 1876
- Anthribus nebulosus J.R.Forster, 1770
- Anthribus nigellus Schoenherr, 1833
- Anthribus nigroclavatus Chevrolat
- Anthribus niveovariegatus (Roelofs, 1878)
- Anthribus obscurus Broun, 1913
- Anthribus ornaticollis Jordan, 1931
- Anthribus ornatus Sharp, 1876
- Anthribus philippinensis Jordan, 1904
- Anthribus phymatodes Redtb., 1868
- Anthribus pilicomis Fabricius, 1801
- Anthribus planatus Jordan, 1904
- Anthribus propinquus Broun, 1911
- Anthribus purpureus Broun, 1880
- Anthribus quadrilineatus De Haan
- Anthribus reconditus Cristofori & Jan, 1832
- Anthribus resurgens
- Anthribus retusus Labram & Imhoff, 1840
- Anthribus roboris Fabricius, 1798
- Anthribus rudis Sharp, 1876
- Anthribus ruficornis Sturm, 1826
- Anthribus rugifer Broun, 1910
- Anthribus rugosus Sharp, 1876
- Anthribus scapularis Gebler, 1841
- Anthribus scoparius Klug, 1834
- Anthribus sharpi Broun, 1880
- Anthribus spinifer Sharp, 1876
- Anthribus sticticus Dejean
- Anthribus stigma Klug, 1834
- Anthribus subpenicillatus J.Thomson, 1858
- Anthribus subroseus Reitter, 1916
- Anthribus sulcirostris Dejean
- Anthribus suspectus Broun, 1910
- Anthribus tenuicornis Dupont
- Anthribus transversus Schoenherr, 1833
- Anthribus tuberculatus Schoenherr, 1833
- Anthribus vandykei Jordan, 1933
- Anthribus variipes Sturm, 1826
- Anthribus vates Sharp, 1876
- Anthribus venustus Broun, 1914
- Anthribus verrucosus Schoenherr, 1833
- Anthribus vittatus E.L.Geoffroy, 1785
- Anthribus wairirensis Broun, 1913
- Anthribus wallacei Wolfrum, 1953
- Anthribus zebra Sturm, 1826
