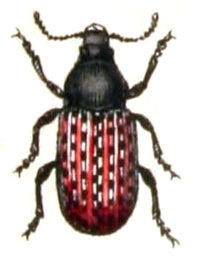
- Anthribus fasciatus

Scientific classification
- Domain: Eukaryota
- Kingdom: Animalia
- Phylum: Arthropoda
- Class: Insecta
- Order: Coleoptera
- Suborder: Polyphaga
- Infraorder: Cucujiformia
- Family: Anthribidae
- Genus: Anthribus
- Species: A. fasciatus

Binomial name
- Anthribus fasciatus Forster, 1770

= Anthribus fasciatus =

Species of beetle

Anthribus fasciatus is a species of fungus weevil in the family Anthribidae. It occurs widely in Europe and is present in the Near East and North Africa; it has been introduced to North America. It preys on Eulecanium tiliae.
