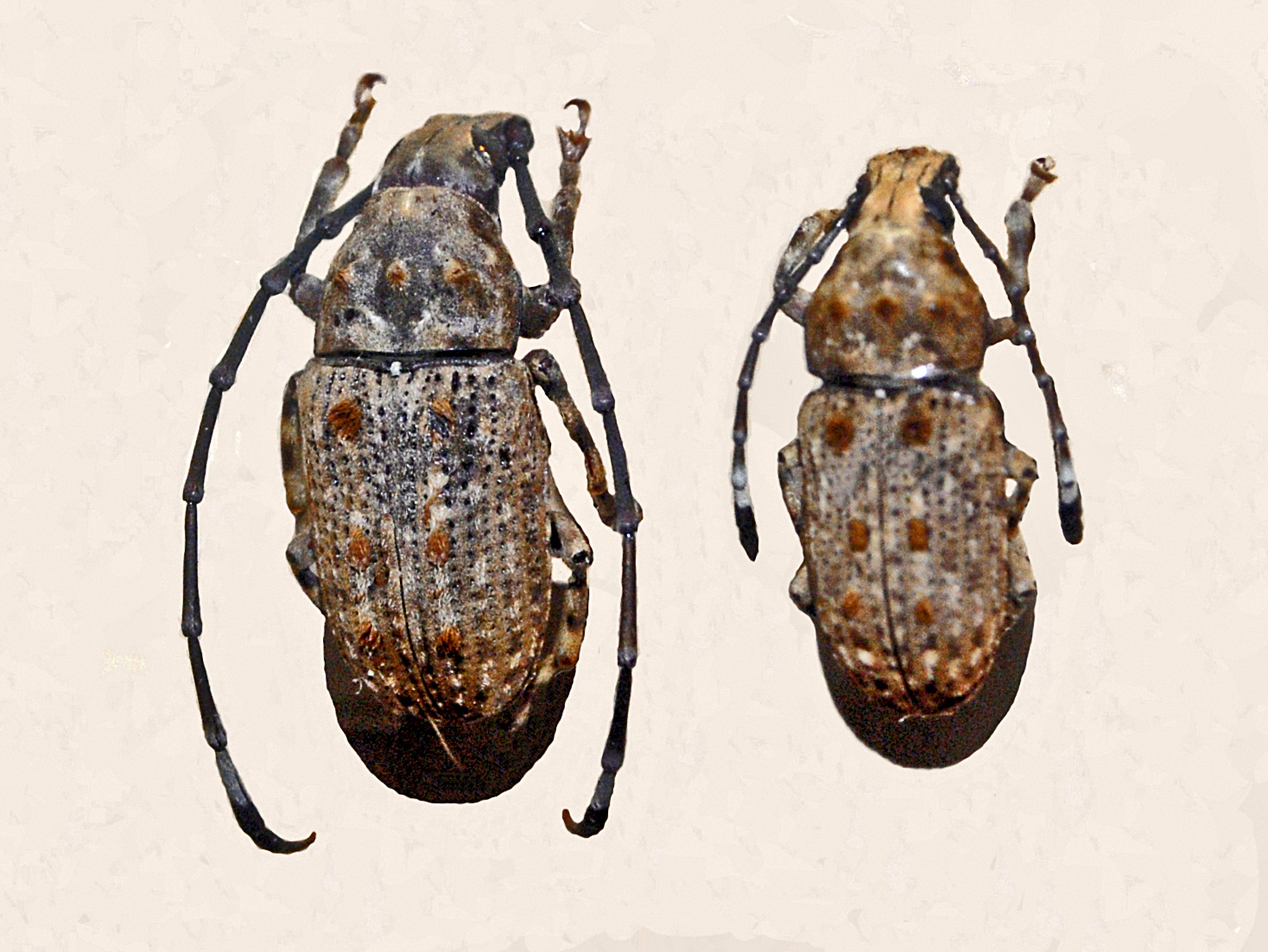
- Platystomos wallacei, male and female. Museum specimen

Scientific classification
- Kingdom: Animalia
- Phylum: Arthropoda
- Class: Insecta
- Order: Coleoptera
- Suborder: Polyphaga
- Infraorder: Cucujiformia
- Family: Anthribidae
- Genus: Platystomos
- Species: P. wallacei

Binomial name
- Platystomos wallacei Wolfrum, 1953

Synonyms
- Phloeobius wallacei; Anthribus wallacei Pascoe, 1860

= Platystomos wallacei =

Species of beetle

Platystomos wallacei is a species of beetle belonging to the family Anthribidae, the fungus weevils.

== Description ==
These fungus weevils have thread-like antennae, that in males are longer than the body.

== Distribution ==
This species can be found in Philippines, Indonesia, New Guinea, Aru Islands and Australia.
