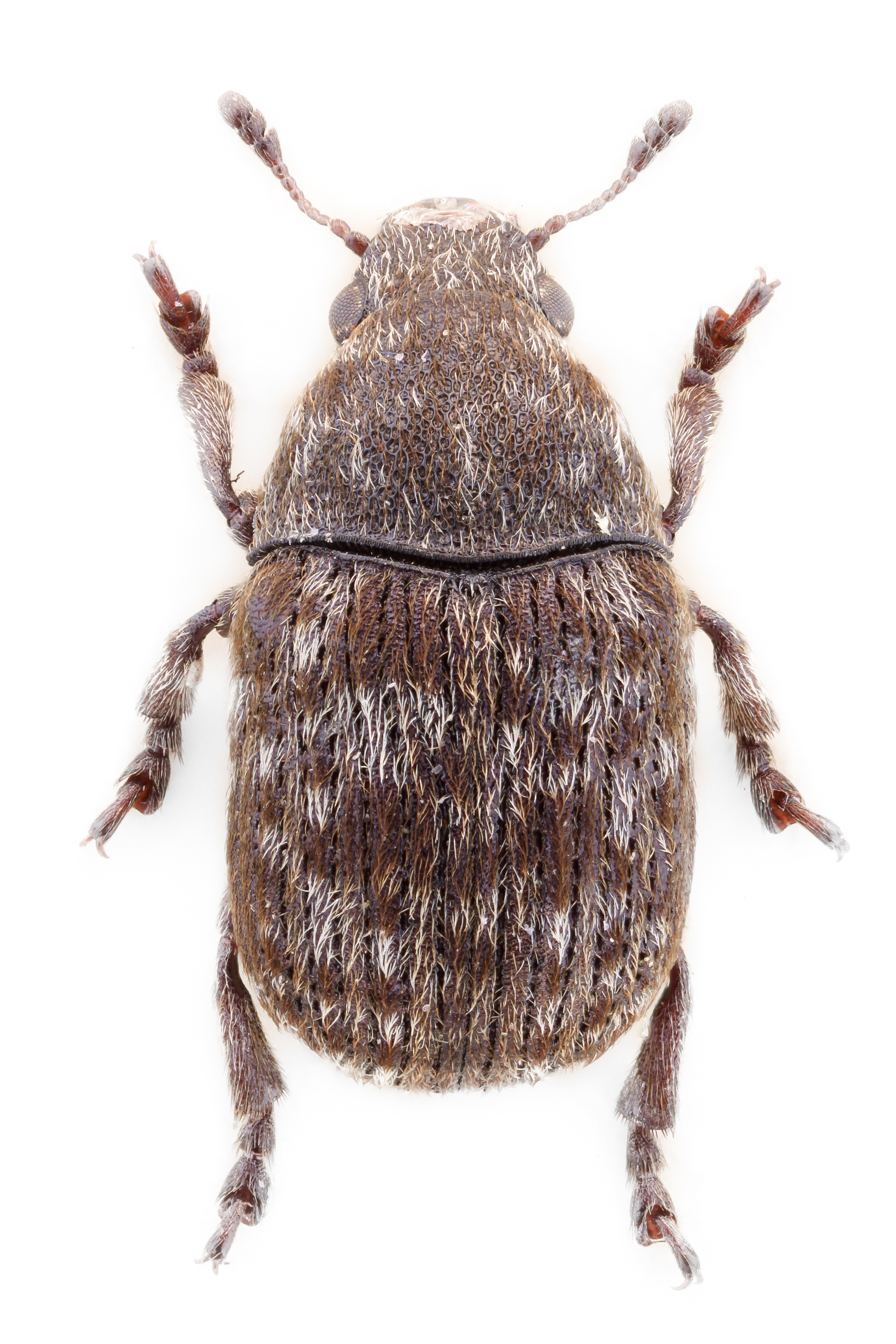

Scientific classification
- Domain: Eukaryota
- Kingdom: Animalia
- Phylum: Arthropoda
- Class: Insecta
- Order: Coleoptera
- Suborder: Polyphaga
- Infraorder: Cucujiformia
- Family: Anthribidae
- Genus: Anthribus
- Species: A. nebulosus

Binomial name
- Anthribus nebulosus Forster, 1770

= Anthribus nebulosus =

Species of beetle

Anthribus nebulosus is a species of fungus weevil, family Anthribidae. It is found in Europe, Near East, and Northern Asia (excluding China) and, as an introduced species, in North America.
