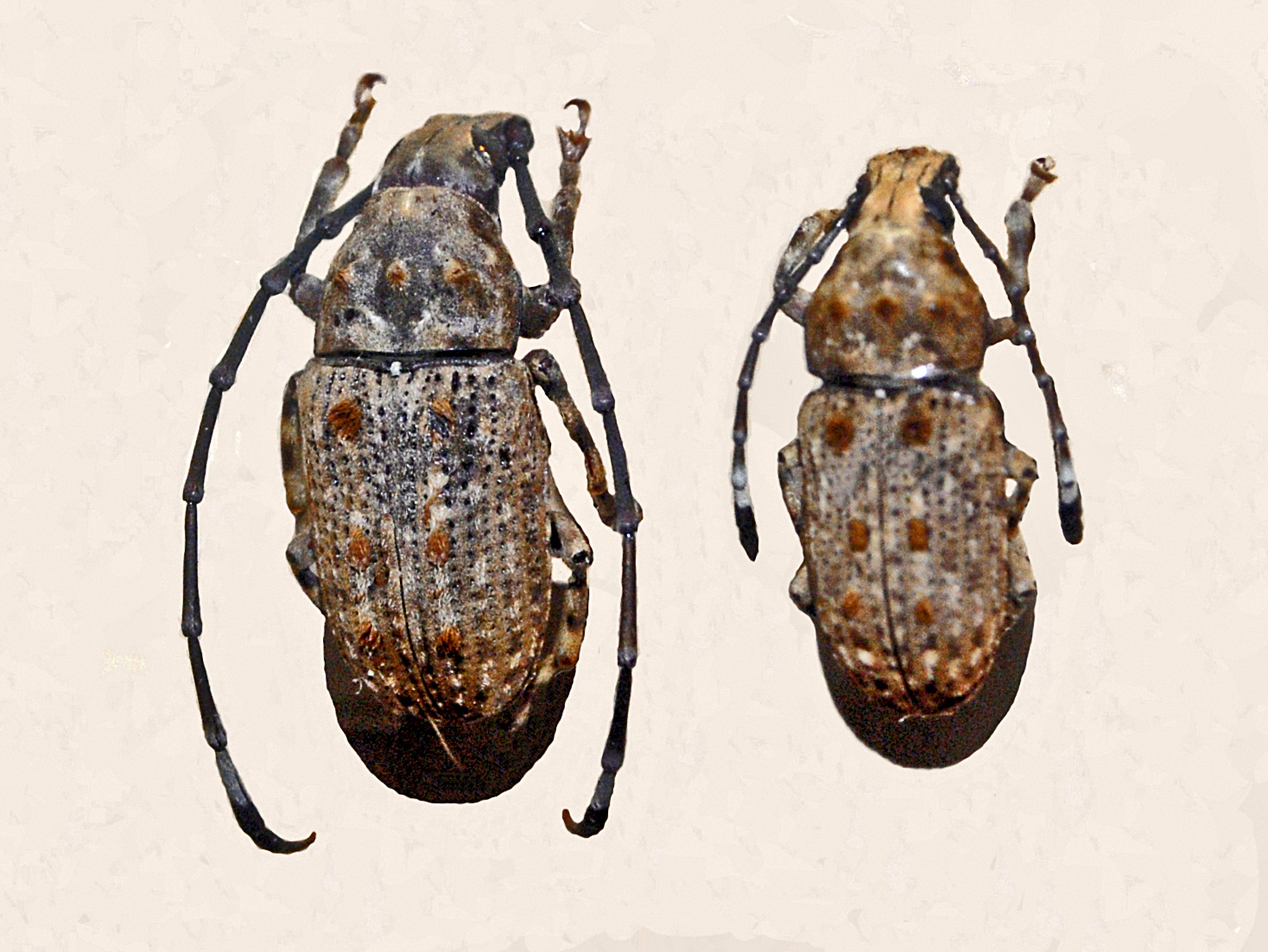
- Platystomos wallacei

Scientific classification
- Kingdom: Animalia
- Phylum: Arthropoda
- Class: Insecta
- Order: Coleoptera
- Suborder: Polyphaga
- Infraorder: Cucujiformia
- Family: Anthribidae
- Genus: Platystomos; Schneider, 1791

= Platystomos =

Genus of beetles

Platystomos is a genus of beetles belonging to the family Anthribidae.

== Species ==
The genus contains at least 18 species:

- Platystomos albinus
- Platystomos andamanensis
- Platystomos cillius
- Platystomos daimio
- Platystomos desertus
- Platystomos frontalis
- Platystomos haplosoma
- Platystomos macrocerus
- Platystomos malaicus
- Platystomos ornaticollis
- Platystomos philippinensis
- Platystomos planatus
- Platystomos sellatus
- Platystomos subpenicillatus
- Platystomos tenuicornis
- Platystomos thierriati
- Platystomos uniformis
- Platystomos wallacei
