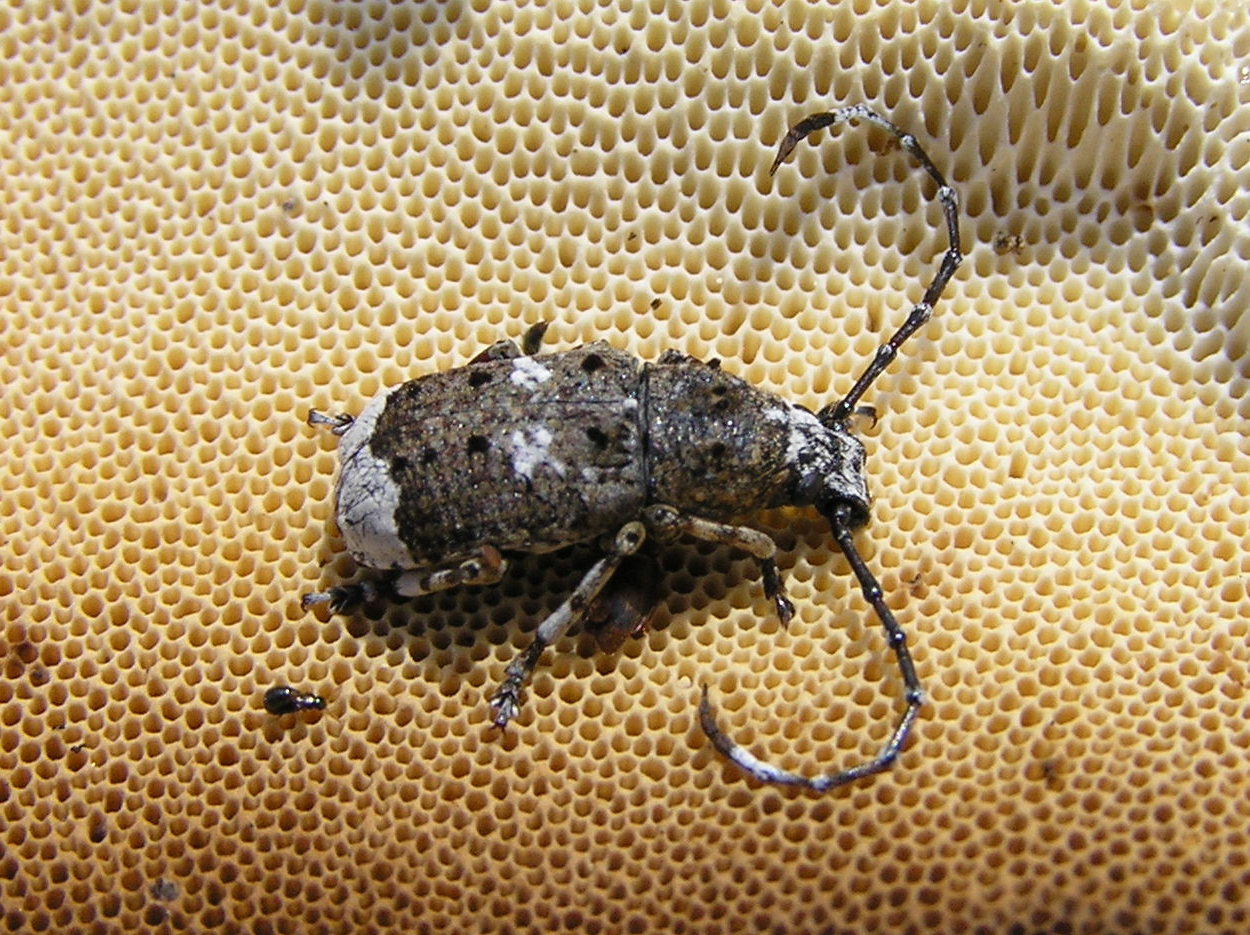

Scientific classification
- Kingdom: Animalia
- Phylum: Arthropoda
- Class: Insecta
- Order: Coleoptera
- Suborder: Polyphaga
- Infraorder: Cucujiformia
- Family: Anthribidae
- Genus: Platystomos
- Species: P. albinus

Binomial name
- Platystomos albinus (Linnaeus, 1758)

Synonyms
- Curculio albinus Linnaeus, 1758; Anthribus albinus Geoffroy, 1762; Macrocephalus albinus Olivier, 1789

= Platystomos albinus =

Species of beetle

Platystomos albinus is a species of beetle in the family Anthribidae, the fungus weevils. Adults measure 7 to 10 mm (0.3–0.4 in). The larvae feed on decaying trees, and are associated with the fungus Daldinia. It is present in deciduous forests throughout Europe and the Near East, including central southern and eastern Britain.

The species was described by Carl Linnaeus as Curculio albinus in his Systema Naturae in 1758.
