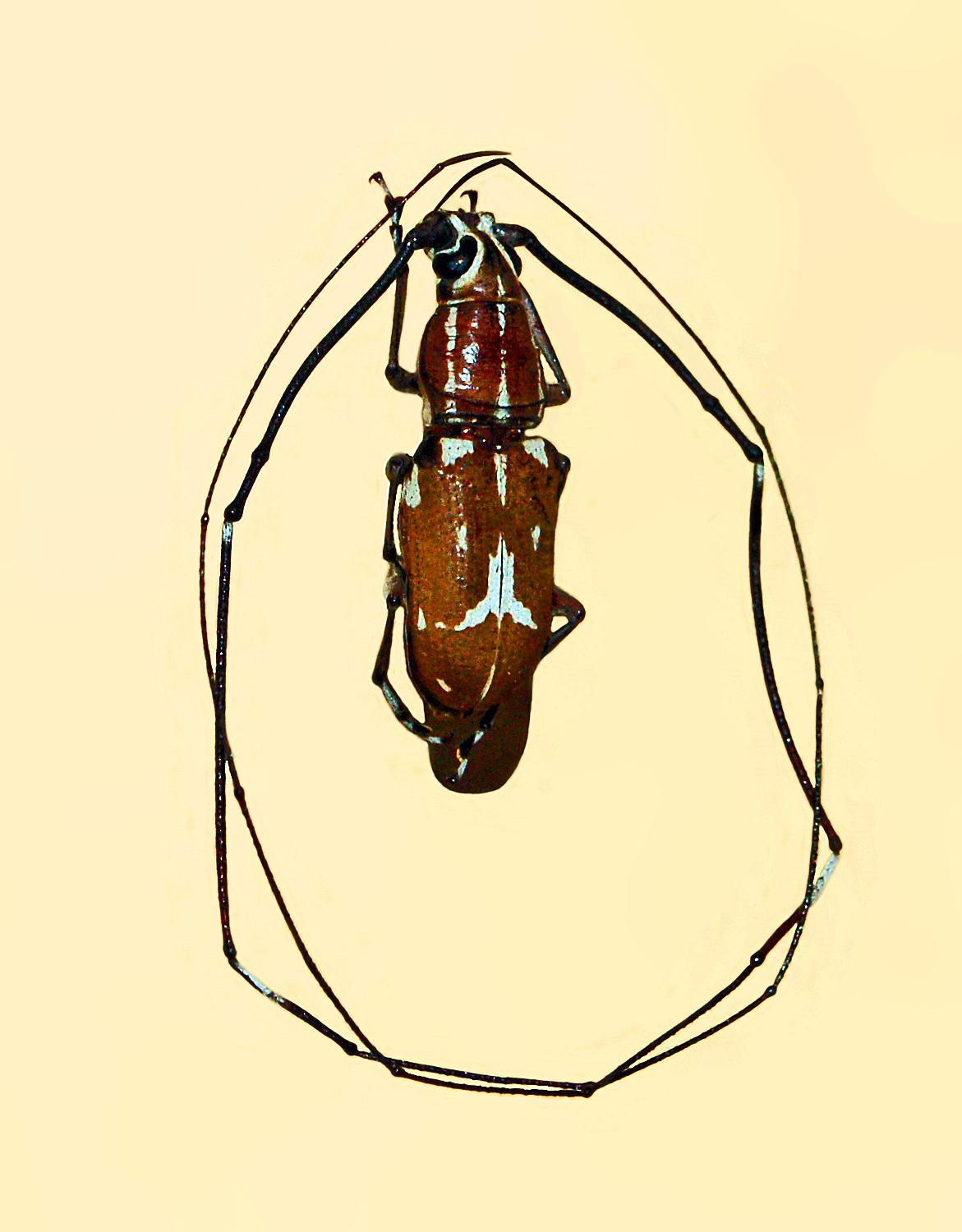
- Xenocerus enganensis from Enggano Island. Male

Scientific classification
- Kingdom: Animalia
- Phylum: Arthropoda
- Class: Insecta
- Order: Coleoptera
- Suborder: Polyphaga
- Infraorder: Cucujiformia
- Family: Anthribidae
- Genus: Xenocerus
- Species: X. enganensis

Binomial name
- Xenocerus enganensis Jordan, 1897

= Xenocerus enganensis =

Species of beetle

Xenocerus enganensis is a species of beetles from the family Anthribidae.

== Description ==
Xenocerus enganensis can reach a body length of about 13 mm. The basic colour is brown, with white markings on the head, the pronotum and the elytra. This species exhibits a strong sexual dimorphism, with very different sizes in males and females. The antennae in the males are thread-like and much longer than the body.

== Distribution ==
This species can be found in Enggano Island.
