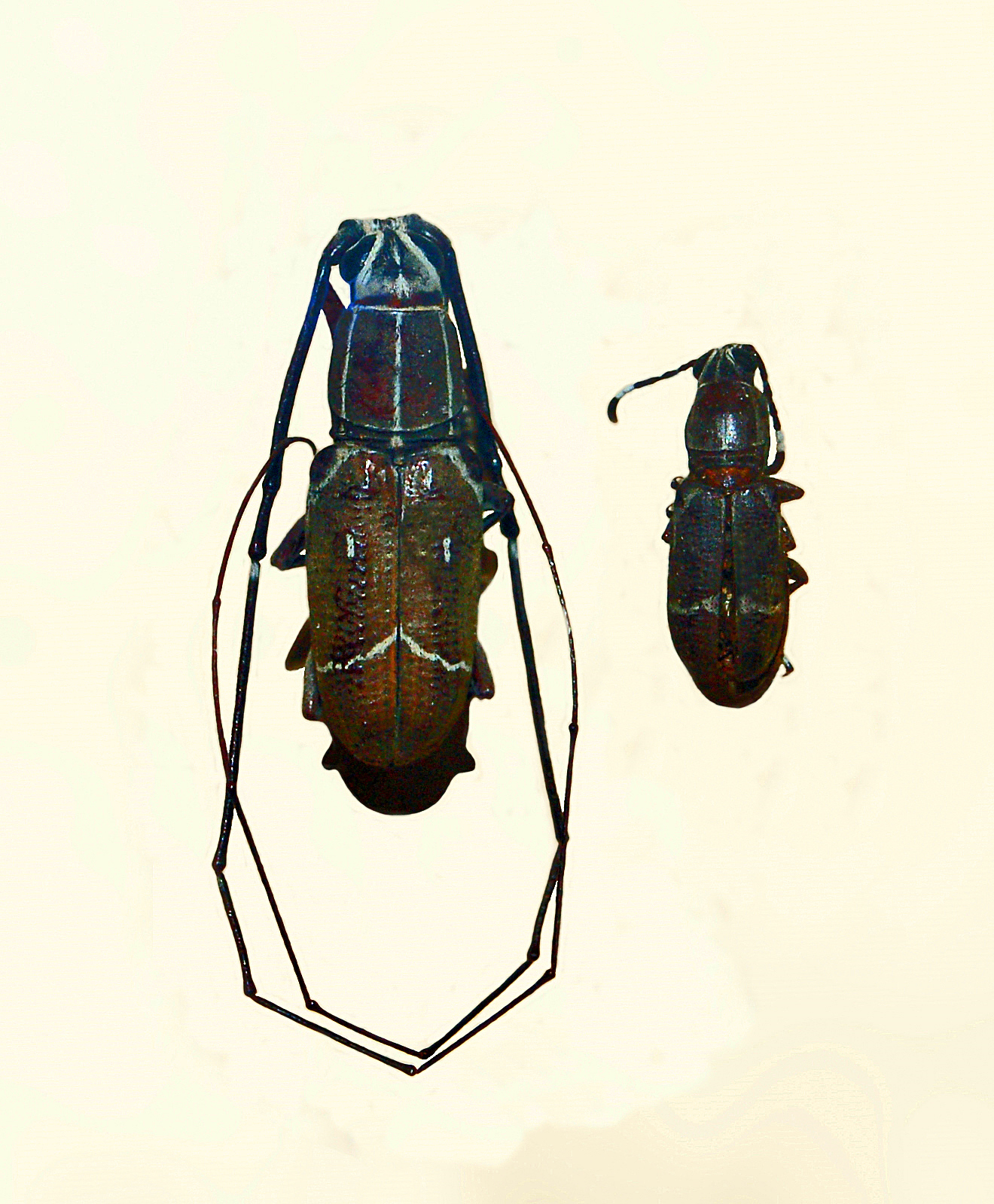
- Xenocerus deletus from Sumatra. Male and female

Scientific classification
- Kingdom: Animalia
- Phylum: Arthropoda
- Clade: Pancrustacea
- Class: Insecta
- Order: Coleoptera
- Suborder: Polyphaga
- Infraorder: Cucujiformia
- Family: Anthribidae
- Genus: Xenocerus
- Species: X. deletus

Binomial name
- Xenocerus deletus Pascoe, 1860

= Xenocerus deletus =

Species of beetle

Xenocerus deletus is a species of beetle from the family Anthribidae.

== Description ==
The basic colour is dark brown, with white markings on the head, the pronotum and the elytra. This species exhibits a strong sexual dimorphism, with very different sizes in males and females. The antennae in the males are thread-like and much longer than the body.

== Distribution ==
This species can be found in Sumatra, Borneo and Malay Peninsula.
