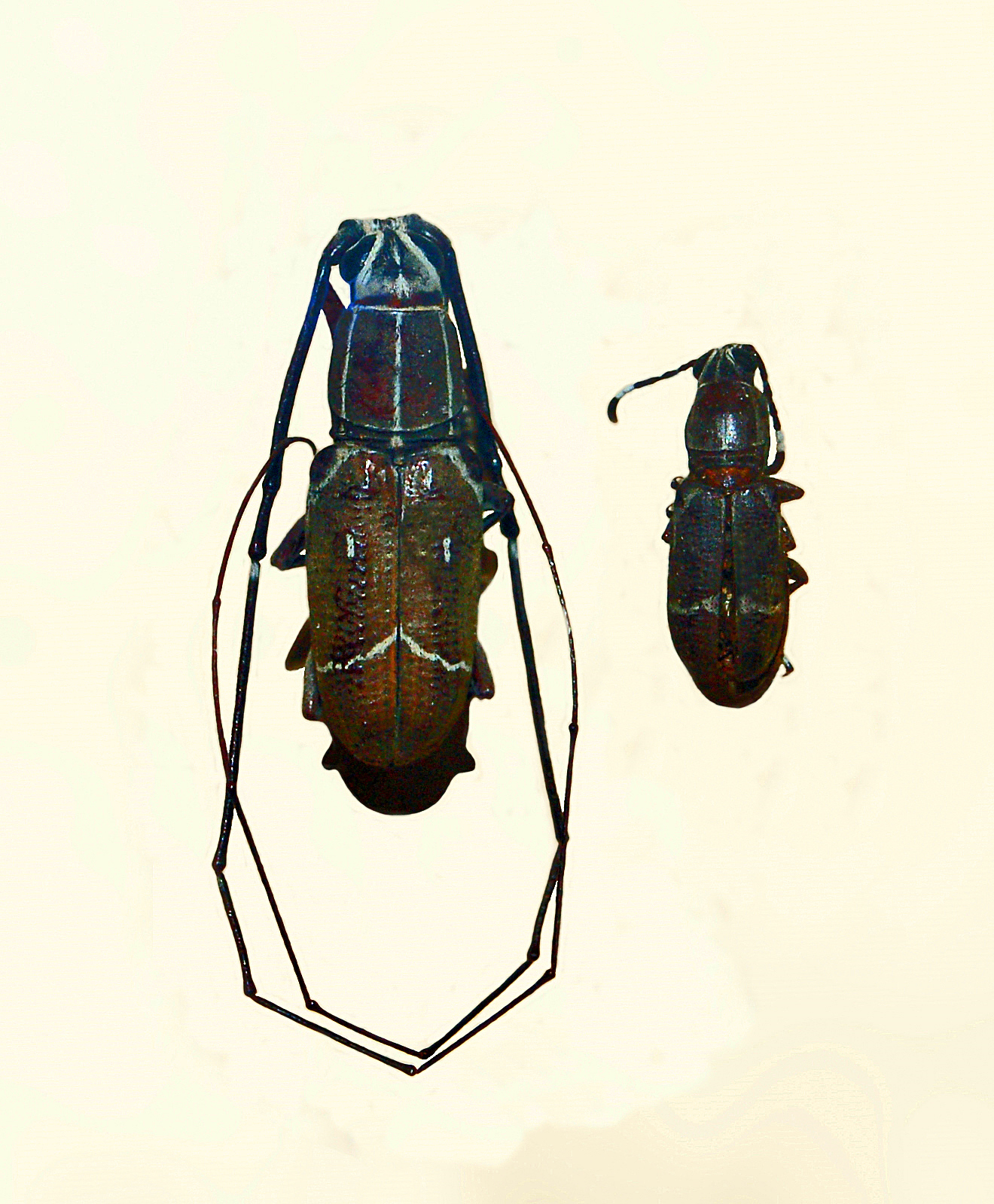
- Xenocerus deletus from Sumatra. Male and female

Scientific classification
- Kingdom: Animalia
- Phylum: Arthropoda
- Class: Insecta
- Order: Coleoptera
- Suborder: Polyphaga
- Infraorder: Cucujiformia
- Family: Anthribidae
- Subfamily: Anthribinae
- Genus: Xenocerus; Schoenherr, 1833

= Xenocerus =

Genus of beetles

Xenocerus is a genus of beetles from the family Anthribidae, also known as fungus weevils.

== List of species ==
- Xenocerus acosmetus Wolfrum, 1953
- Xenocerus acrus Wolfrum, 1938
- Xenocerus albolineatus Blanchard, 1853
- Xenocerus albotriangularis Motschulsky, 1874
- Xenocerus alorensis Jordan, 1898
- Xenocerus aluensis Jordan, 1895
- Xenocerus anandrus Jordan, 1945
- Xenocerus ancyra Jordan, 1924
- Xenocerus andamanensis Jordan, 1894
- Xenocerus annulifer Jordan, 1903
- Xenocerus anthriboides Montrouzier, 1857
- Xenocerus atratus Jordan, 1903
- Xenocerus australicus Wolfrum, 1953
- Xenocerus barbicornis Gestro, 1857
- Xenocerus basilanus Jordan, 1903
- Xenocerus beesoni Jordan, 1937
- Xenocerus bicinctus Jordan, 1894
- Xenocerus birmanicus Jordan, 1903
- Xenocerus buruanus Jordan, 1898
- Xenocerus callimus Jordan, 1911
- Xenocerus charis Jordan, 1937
- Xenocerus cinctus Jordan, 1894
- Xenocerus compressicornis Jordan, 1894
- Xenocerus confertus Jordan, 1924
- Xenocerus conjunctus Jordan, 1895
- Xenocerus corae Gestro, 1875
- Xenocerus cratus Jordan, 1945
- Xenocerus cultus Jordan, 1945
- Xenocerus cylindricollis Fabricius, 1801
- Xenocerus dacrytus Jordan, 1924
- Xenocerus decemguttatus Jordan, 1895
- Xenocerus deletus Pascoe, 1860
- Xenocerus detersus Jordan, 1945
- Xenocerus discrepans Jordan, 1895
- Xenocerus dives Jordan, 1923
- Xenocerus divisus Jordan, 1945
- Xenocerus dohertyiJordan, 1894
- Xenocerus eichhorni Jordan, 1945
- Xenocerus eichorni Jordan, 1945
- Xenocerus enganensis Jordan, 1897
- Xenocerus epomis Jordan, 1913
- Xenocerus equestris Pascoe, 1860
- Xenocerus everetti Jordan, 1894
- Xenocerus evidens Heller, 1918
- Xenocerus fasciatus Jordan, 1898
- Xenocerus fastuosus Gestro, 1875
- Xenocerus fimbriatus Pascoe, 1860
- Xenocerus flagellatus Fåhraeus, 1839
- Xenocerus fruhstorferiJordan, 1894
- Xenocerus fucatus Jordan, 1945
- Xenocerus furcifer Jordan, 1898
- Xenocerus hamifer Heller, 1925
- Xenocerus henricus Jordan, 1903
- Xenocerus hippotes Jordan,
- Xenocerus humeralis Gestro, 1875
- Xenocerus inarmatus Wolfrum, 1938
- Xenocerus insignis Pascoe, 1859
- Xenocerus interruptus Jordan, 1898
- Xenocerus jacobsoni Jordan, 1915
- Xenocerus kaioanus Jordan, 1945
- Xenocerus kuehniJordan, 1903
- Xenocerus lacrimosus Heller, 1923
- Xenocerus lacrymans J. Thomson, 1857
- Xenocerus lactifer Heller, 1918
- Xenocerus laevicollis Jordan, 1894
- Xenocerus lateralis Jordan, 1894
- Xenocerus latifasciatus Jordan, 1894
- Xenocerus lautus Jordan, 1904
- Xenocerus leucogrammus Motschulsky 1874
- Xenocerus licheneus Jordan, 1913
- Xenocerus lineatus Jordan, 1894
- Xenocerus longicornis Jordan, 1894
- Xenocerus longinus Jordan, 1898
- Xenocerus luctificus Fairmaire, 1883
- Xenocerus maculatus Jordan, 1898
- Xenocerus mamillatus Jordan, 1903
- Xenocerus megistus Jordan, 1945
- Xenocerus mesites Jordan, 1913
- Xenocerus mesosternalis Jordan, 1894
- Xenocerus metrius Jordan, 1945
- Xenocerus molitor Jordan, 1895
- Xenocerus monstrator Heller, 1918
- Xenocerus mortiensis Jordan, 1903
- Xenocerus nativitatis Gahan, 1900
- Xenocerus niveofasciatus Gestro, 1875
- Xenocerus ornatus Jordan, 1897
- Xenocerus perfossus Wolfrum, 1938
- Xenocerus perplexus Jordan, 1895
- Xenocerus phaleratus Jordan, 1945
- Xenocerus philippinensis Heller, 1923
- Xenocerus pictus Kirsch, 1875
- Xenocerus platyzona Jordan, 1913
- Xenocerus pruinosus Heller, 1918
- Xenocerus punctatus Jordan, 1894
- Xenocerus puncticollis Jordan, 1894
- Xenocerus purus Jordan, 1945
- Xenocerus rectilineatus Jordan, 1894
- Xenocerus rubianus Jordan, 1903
- Xenocerus rufus Jordan, 1903
- Xenocerus russatus Jordan, 1903
- Xenocerus salamandrinus Jordan, 1916
- Xenocerus saleyerensis Jordan, 1898
- Xenocerus samaranus Jordan, 1898
- Xenocerus sambawanus Jordan, 1895
- Xenocerus saperdoides Gyllenhal in Schoenherr, 1833
- Xenocerus scalaris Jordan, 1894
- Xenocerus scutellaris Jordan, 1897
- Xenocerus semiluctuosus Blanchard, 1853
- Xenocerus seminiveus Motschulsky, 1874
- Xenocerus senex Jordan, 1913
- Xenocerus sibuyanus Heller, 1923
- Xenocerus siccus Heller, 1925
- Xenocerus simplex Jordan, 1894
- Xenocerus speciosus Jordan, 1898
- Xenocerus speracerus Montrouzier, 1857
- Xenocerus spilotus Jordan, 1903
- Xenocerus striatus Jordan, 1894
- Xenocerus sudestensis Jordan, 1903
- Xenocerus suturalis Jordan, 1904
- Xenocerus tenuatus Jordan, 1945
- Xenocerus tephrus Wolfrum, 1953
- Xenocerus timius Jordan, 1945
- Xenocerus timorensis Jordan, 1928
- Xenocerus toliensis Jordan, 1898
- Xenocerus trapezifer Heller, 1925
- Xenocerus umbrinus Jordan, 1898
- Xenocerus variabilis Pascoe, 1860
- Xenocerus varians Jordan, 1898
- Xenocerus velutinus Gestro, 1875
- Xenocerus vidua Jordan, 1903
- Xenocerus vinosus Heller, 1923
- Xenocerus virgatus Jordan, 1913
- Xenocerus websteri Jordan, 1898
- Xenocerus whiteheadi Jordan, 1898
