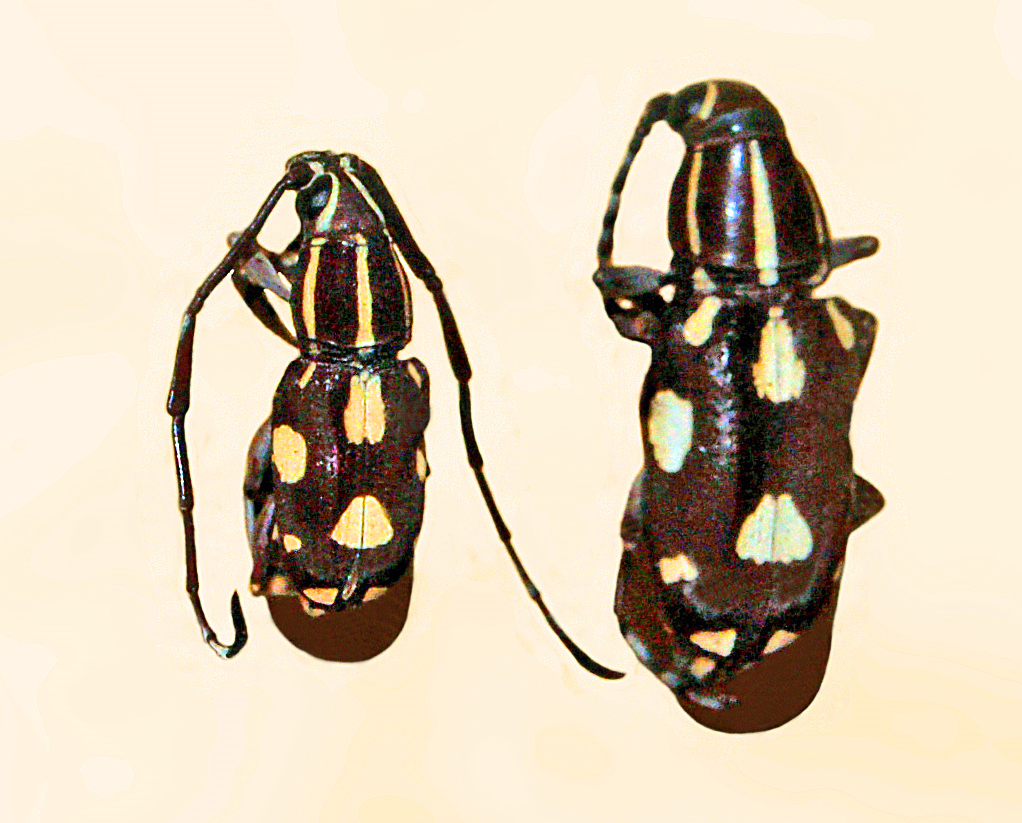
- Xenocerus lacrymans from New Guinea

Scientific classification
- Kingdom: Animalia
- Phylum: Arthropoda
- Class: Insecta
- Order: Coleoptera
- Suborder: Polyphaga
- Infraorder: Cucujiformia
- Family: Anthribidae
- Genus: Xenocerus
- Species: X. lacrymans

Binomial name
- Xenocerus lacrymans J. Thomson, 1857

= Xenocerus lacrymans =

Species of beetle

Xenocerus lacrymans is a species of beetles from the family Anthribidae.

== Description ==
Xenocerus lacrymans can reach a body length of about 10 mm. The basic colour is brown, with white markings on the head, the pronotum and the elytra.

== Subspecies ==
- Xenocerus lacrymans herbertus Jordan, 1906
- Xenocerus lacrymans lacrymans J. Thomson, 1857

== Distribution ==
This species can be found in New Guinea and Aru Islands.
