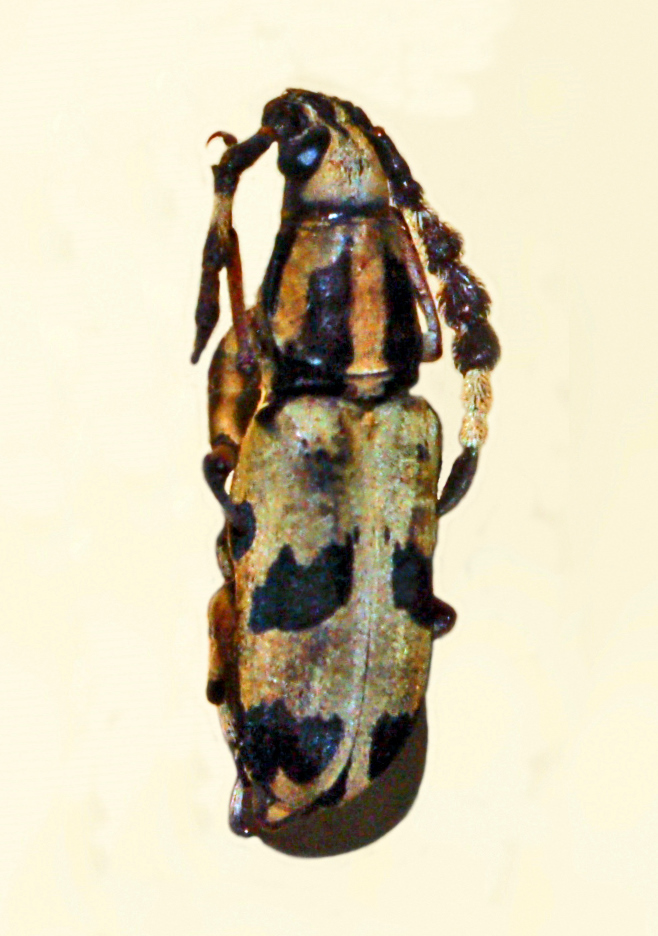
- Xenocerus speciosus from Nias Island

Scientific classification
- Kingdom: Animalia
- Phylum: Arthropoda
- Class: Insecta
- Order: Coleoptera
- Suborder: Polyphaga
- Infraorder: Cucujiformia
- Family: Anthribidae
- Genus: Xenocerus
- Species: X. speciosus

Binomial name
- Xenocerus speciosus Jordan, 1898

= Xenocerus speciosus =

Species of beetle

Xenocerus speciosus is a species of beetles from the family Anthribidae.

== Description ==
Xenocerus speciosus can reach a body length of about 10 mm. The basic colour is greyish, with black markings on the pronotum and the elytra.

== Distribution ==
This species can be found in Nias Island.
