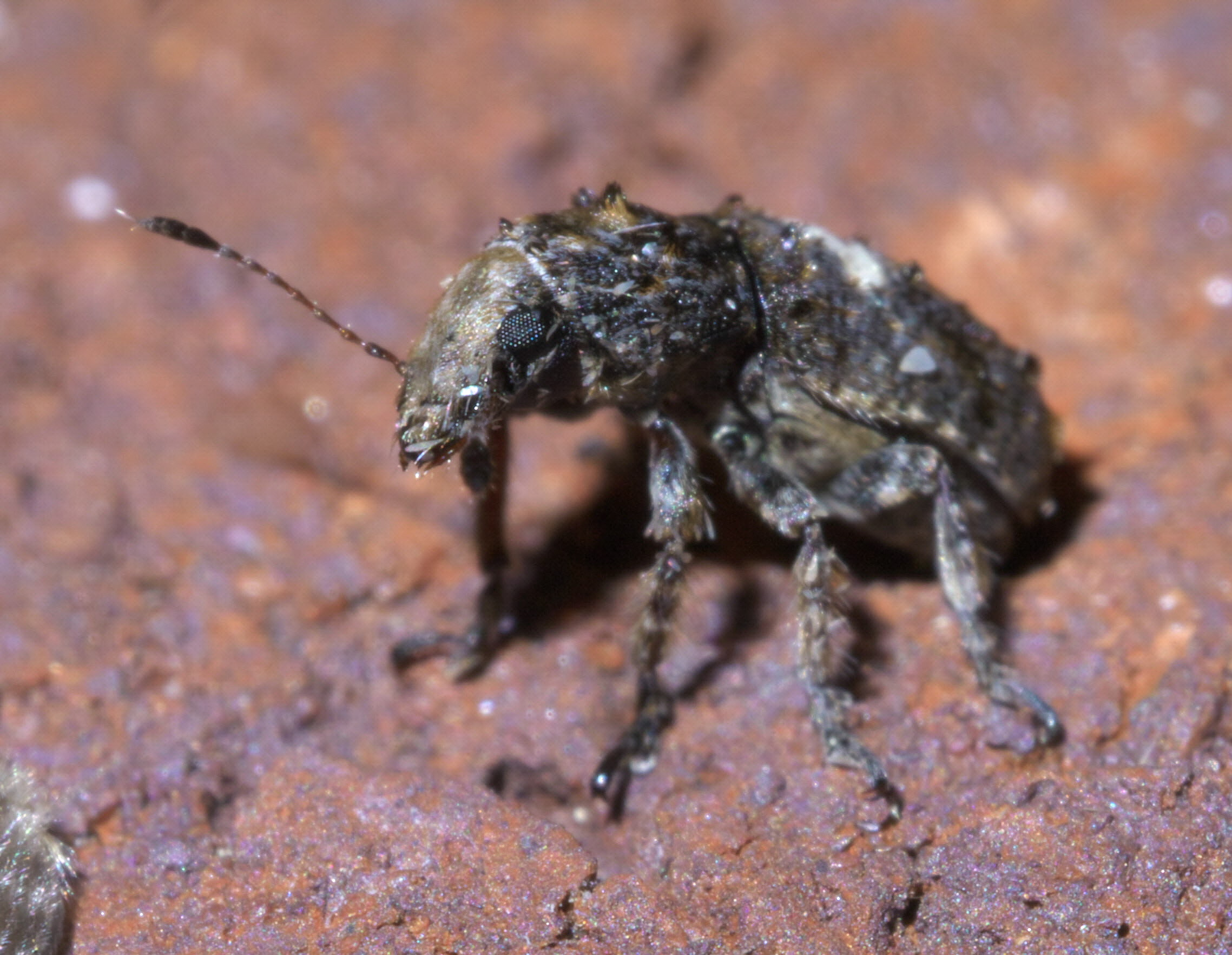

Scientific classification
- Domain: Eukaryota
- Kingdom: Animalia
- Phylum: Arthropoda
- Class: Insecta
- Order: Coleoptera
- Suborder: Polyphaga
- Infraorder: Cucujiformia
- Family: Anthribidae
- Genus: Toxonotus
- Species: T. cornutus

Binomial name
- Toxonotus cornutus (Say, 1831)

= Toxonotus cornutus =

Species of beetle

Toxonotus cornutus is a species of fungus weevil in the beetle family Anthribidae. It is found in Central America, North America, and Oceania.

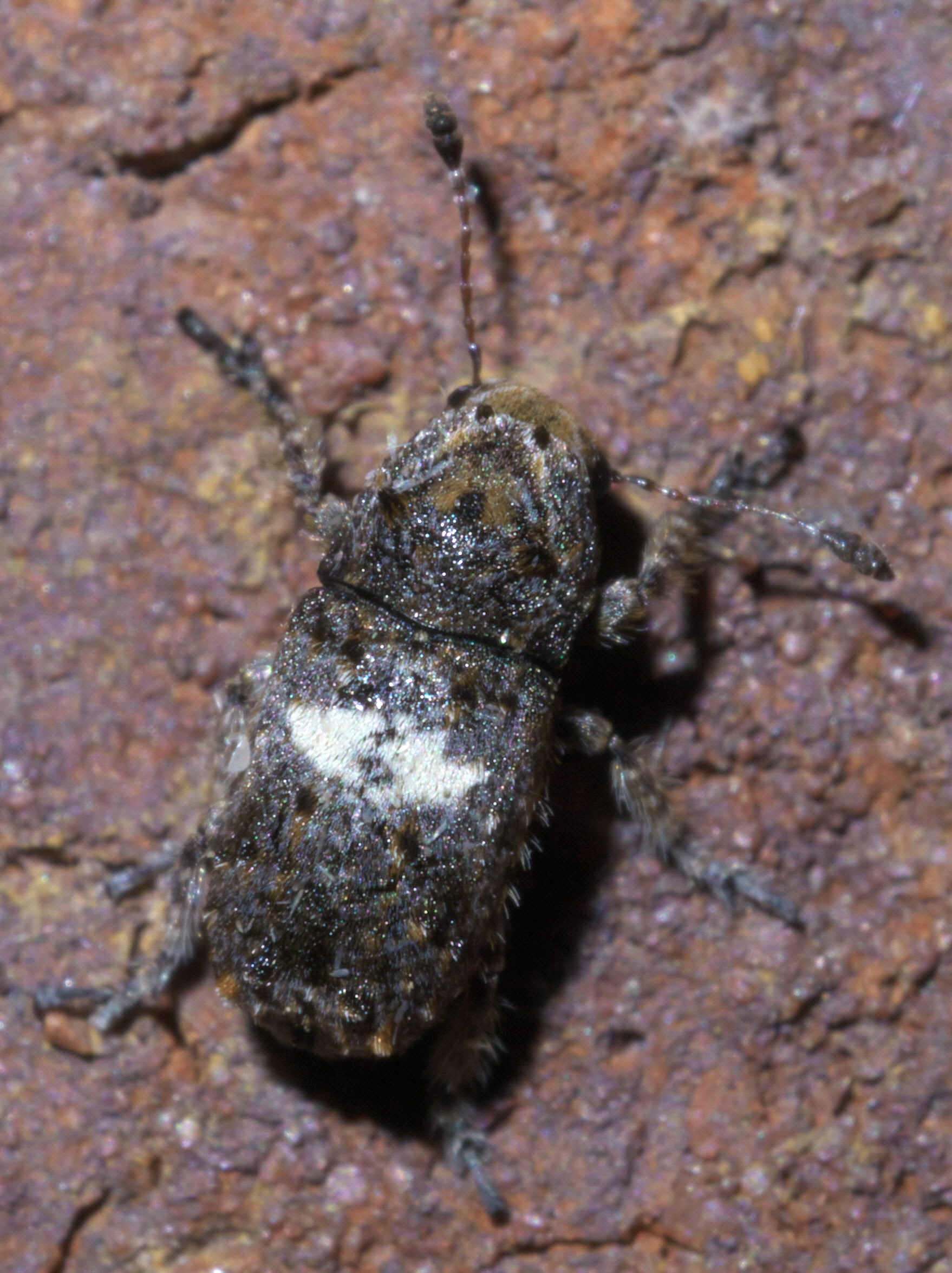

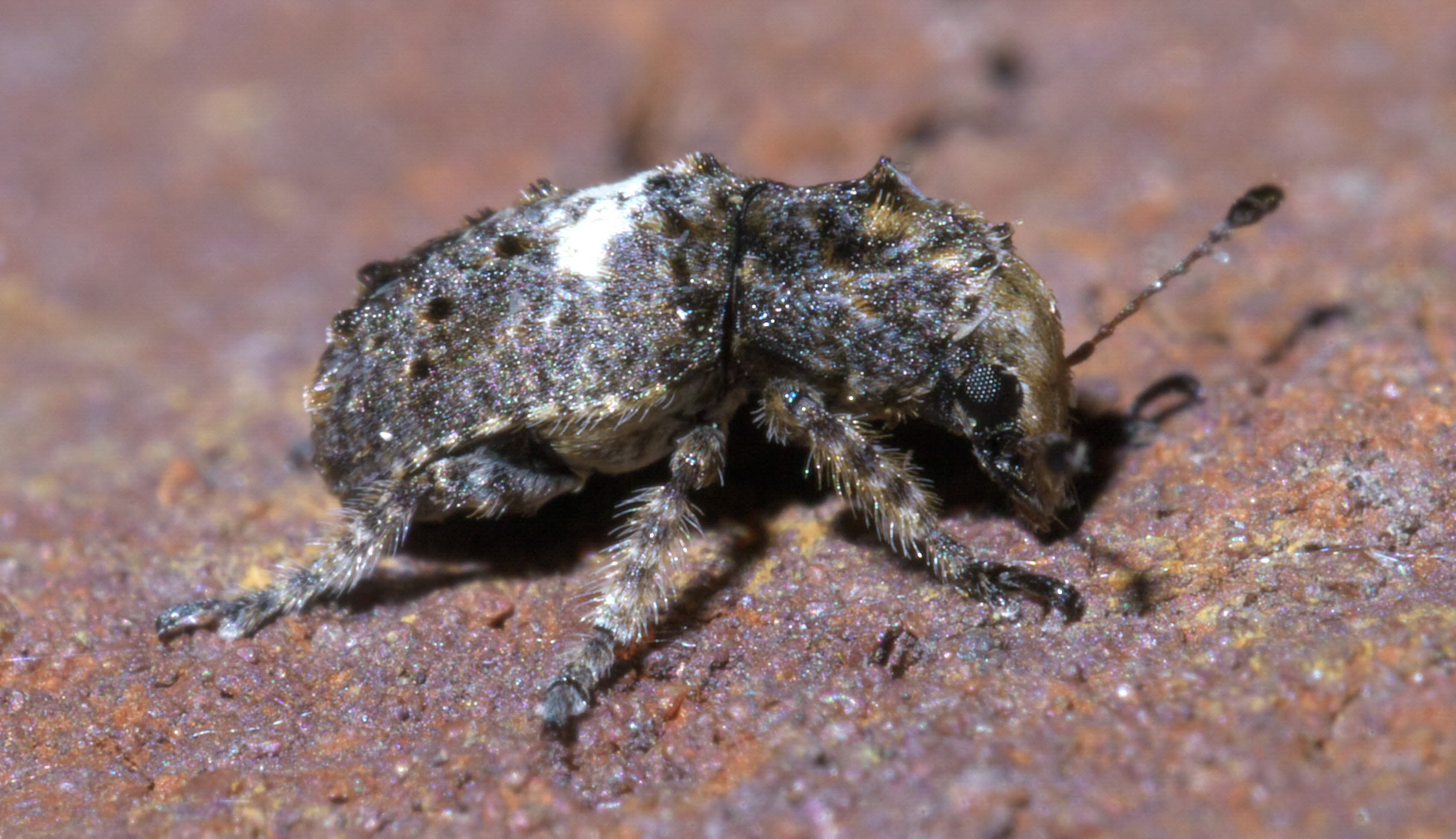
