= Toxonotus bipunctatus =

Scientific classification
- Domain: Eukaryota
- Kingdom: Animalia
- Phylum: Arthropoda
- Class: Insecta
- Order: Coleoptera
- Suborder: Polyphaga
- Infraorder: Cucujiformia
- Family: Anthribidae
- Genus: Toxonotus
- Species: T. bipunctatus

Binomial name
- Toxonotus bipunctatus (Schaeffer, 1904)

Species of beetle

Toxonotus bipunctatus is a species of fungus weevil in the beetle family Anthribidae.
