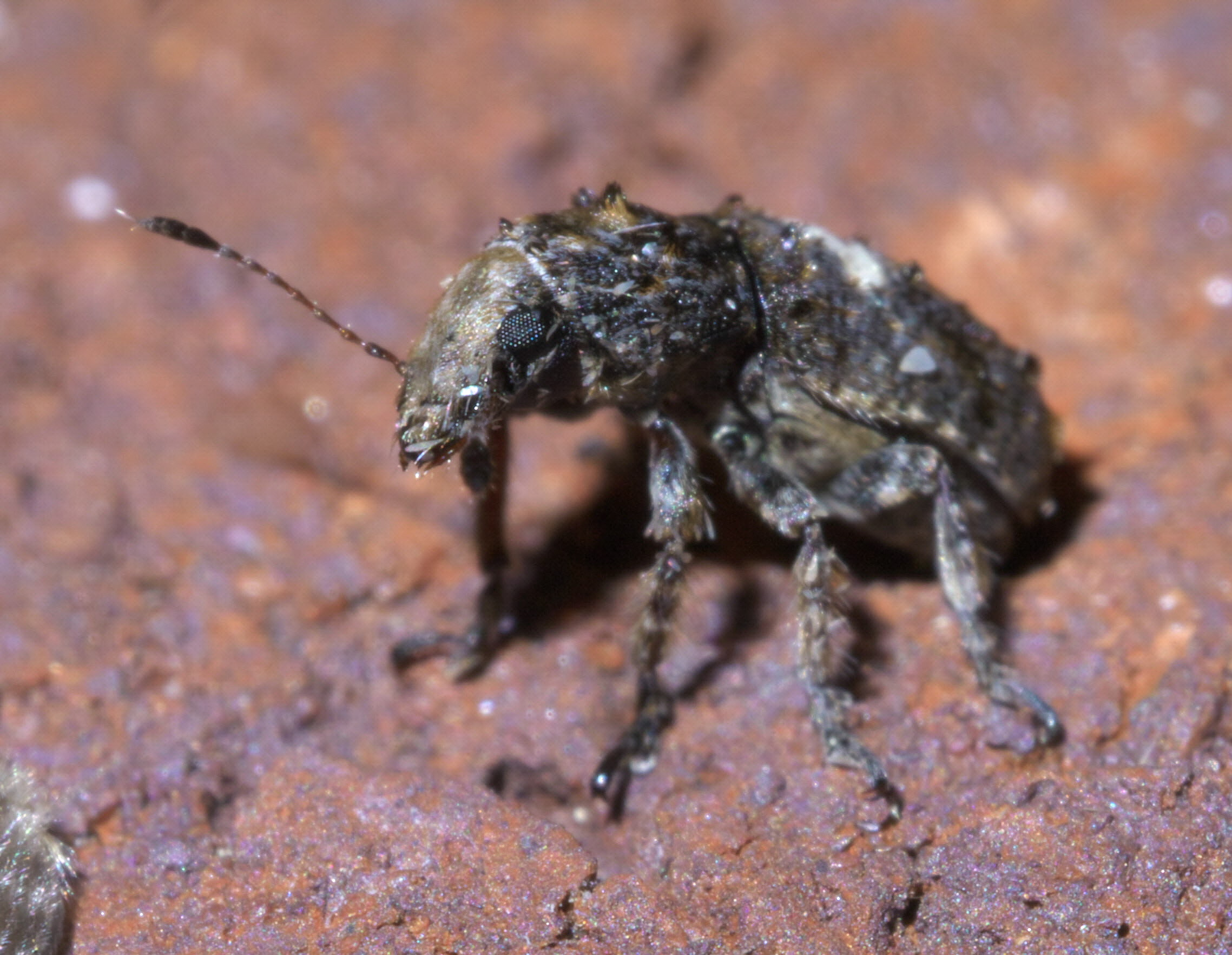
- Toxonotus cornutus

Scientific classification
- Domain: Eukaryota
- Kingdom: Animalia
- Phylum: Arthropoda
- Class: Insecta
- Order: Coleoptera
- Suborder: Polyphaga
- Infraorder: Cucujiformia
- Family: Anthribidae
- Tribe: Platystomini
- Genus: Toxonotus; Lacordaire, 1866

= Toxonotus =

Genus of beetles

Toxonotus is a genus of fungus weevils in the beetle family Anthribidae. There are about 13 described species in Toxonotus.

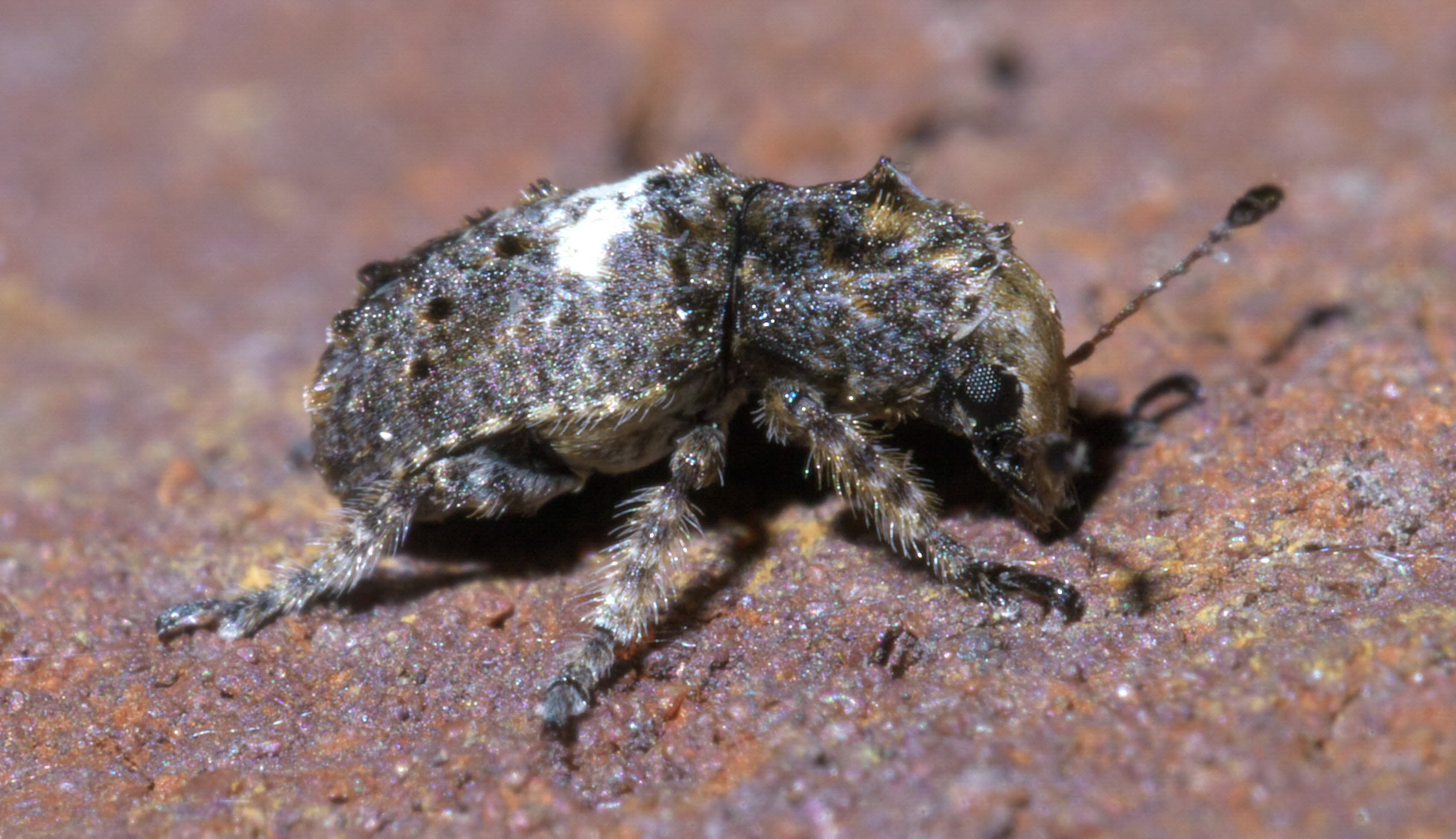
Toxonotus cornutus

== Species ==
These 13 species belong to the genus Toxonotus:

- Toxonotus bidens Valentine, 1955
- Toxonotus bipunctatus (Schaeffer, 1904)
- Toxonotus comatus Poinar & Legalov, 2016
- Toxonotus cornutus (Say, 1831)
- Toxonotus fascicularis (Schoenherr, 1833)
- Toxonotus inaequalis (Jordan, 1904)
- Toxonotus lividus (LeConte, 1876)
- Toxonotus notatus Valentine
- Toxonotus penicellatus (Schaeffer, 1904)
- Toxonotus ruscarius Valentine
- Toxonotus triguttulatus Frieser & R., 2004
- Toxonotus trituberculatus Wolfrum, 1953
- Toxonotus vagus (Horn, 1894)
