= Toxonotus lividus =

Scientific classification
- Kingdom: Animalia
- Phylum: Arthropoda
- Class: Insecta
- Order: Coleoptera
- Suborder: Polyphaga
- Infraorder: Cucujiformia
- Family: Anthribidae
- Genus: Toxonotus
- Species: T. lividus

Binomial name
- Toxonotus lividus (LeConte, 1876)

Species of beetle

Toxonotus lividus is a species of fungus weevil in the beetle family Anthribidae.
