= Toxonotus fascicularis =

Scientific classification
- Domain: Eukaryota
- Kingdom: Animalia
- Phylum: Arthropoda
- Class: Insecta
- Order: Coleoptera
- Suborder: Polyphaga
- Infraorder: Cucujiformia
- Family: Anthribidae
- Genus: Toxonotus
- Species: T. fascicularis

Binomial name
- Toxonotus fascicularis (Schoenherr, 1833)

Species of beetle

Toxonotus fascicularis is a species of fungus weevil in the beetle family Anthribidae. It is found in the Caribbean Sea and North America.
