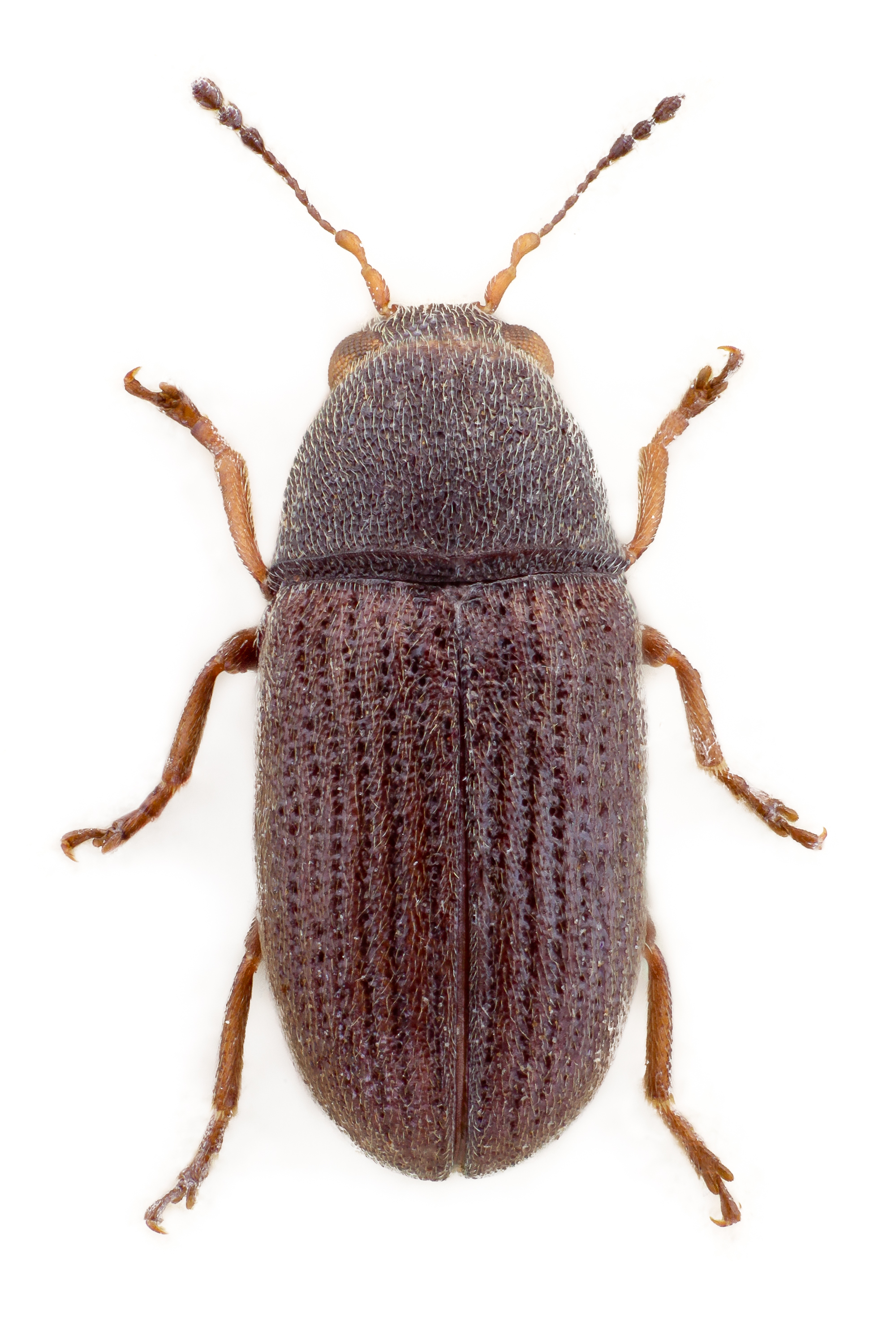
- Choragus horni

Scientific classification
- Kingdom: Animalia
- Phylum: Arthropoda
- Class: Insecta
- Order: Coleoptera
- Suborder: Polyphaga
- Infraorder: Cucujiformia
- Family: Anthribidae
- Subfamily: Choraginae
- Tribe: Choragini
- Genus: Choragus; Kirby, 1819

= Choragus (beetle) =

Genus of beetles

Choragus is a genus of fungus weevils in the family of beetles known as Anthribidae. There are at least 60 described species in Choragus.

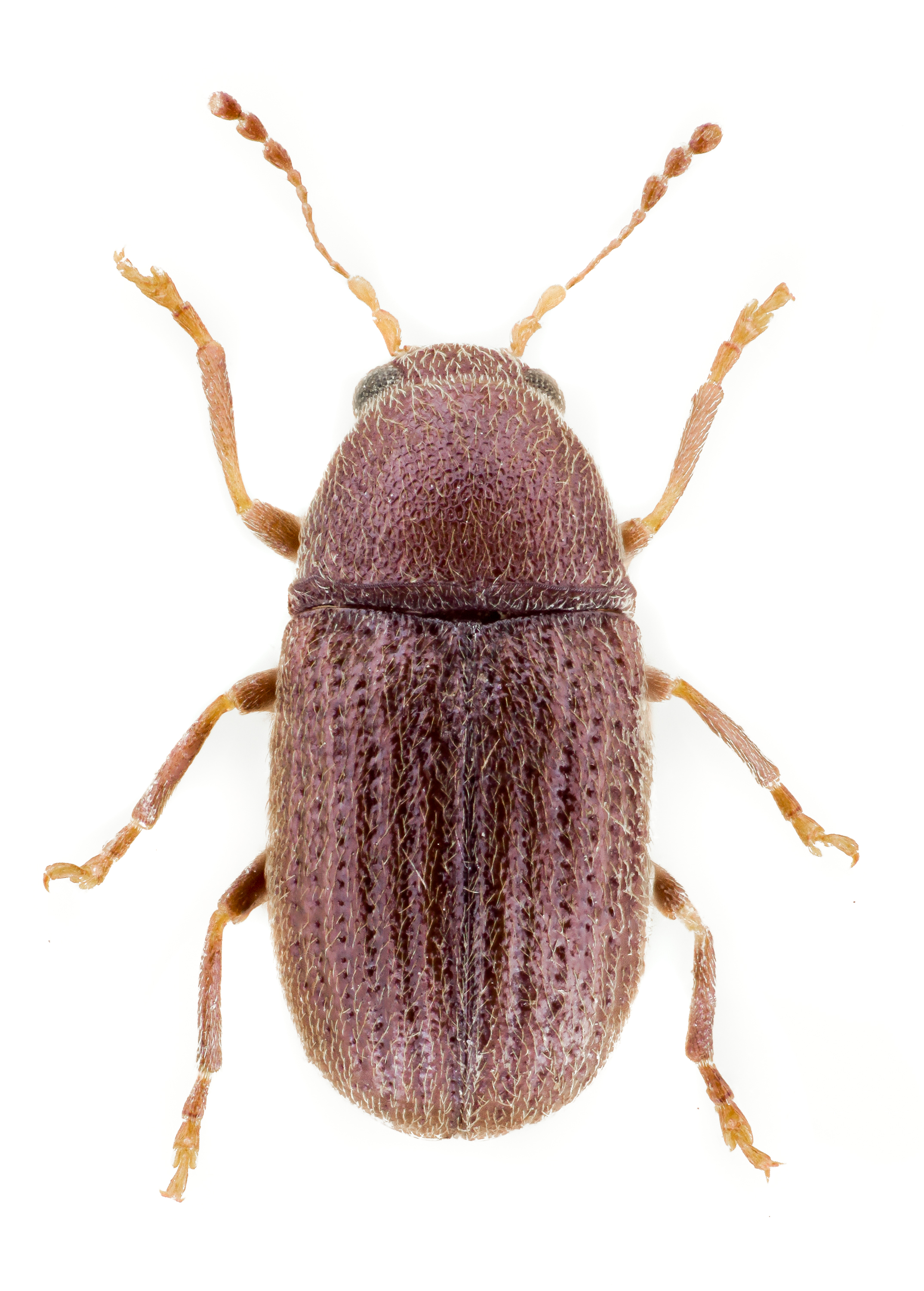
Choragus sheppardi

== Species ==
These 62 species belong to the genus Choragus:

- Choragus angustelineatus Frieser, 1978^{c}
- Choragus anobioides Sharp, 1891^{c}
- Choragus anonymus Frieser, R., 1994^{c g}
- Choragus arcuatus Frieser, 1983^{c g}
- Choragus aureolineatus Abeille, 1893^{g}
- Choragus aurolineatus Abeille, 1893^{c}
- Choragus bolus Jordan, 1914^{c}
- Choragus bostrychoides Mull. in Germ., 1821^{c}
- Choragus breviclava Frieser, 1983^{c g}
- Choragus brevior Frieser, 1981^{c g}
- Choragus caucasicus Motsch., 1873^{c}
- Choragus cissoides Sharp, 1891^{c}
- Choragus compactus Sharp, 1891^{c}
- Choragus costulatus Frieser, R., 2001^{c g}
- Choragus cryphaloides Sharp, 1891^{c}
- Choragus cryptocephalus Sharp, 1891^{c}
- Choragus cylindricollis Frieser, R., 2004^{c g}
- Choragus dentipes Frieser, 1981^{c g}
- Choragus distendens Frieser, 1981^{g}
- Choragus ebeninus Frieser, R., 2000^{c g}
- Choragus excavatus Frieser, 1983^{c g}
- Choragus exophthalmus Valentine, 1998^{i g}
- Choragus faucium Jordan, 1937^{c}
- Choragus fictilis Scudder, S.H., 1890^{c g}
- Choragus flavofasciatus Frieser, R., 2004^{c g}
- Choragus fulvescens Frieser, R., 2004^{c g}
- Choragus galeazzii Wolfrum, 1953^{c}
- Choragus globuliformis Frieser, R., 2001^{c g}
- Choragus grandicollis Frieser, R., 2001^{c g}
- Choragus granulipennis Frieser, 1983^{c g}
- Choragus grenieri Bris., 1867^{c}
- Choragus harrisi LeConte, 1878^{i c}
- Choragus horni Wolfrum, 1930^{c}
- Choragus interruptofasciatus Frieser, R., 2004^{c g}
- Choragus kuehbandneri Frieser, 1980^{g}
- Choragus major Valentine, 1998^{i g}
- Choragus malus Johraku, 1953^{c}
- Choragus mimetes Wolfrum, 1960^{c}
- Choragus monticulatus Frieser, R., 2001^{c g}
- Choragus mundulus Sharp, 1891^{c}
- Choragus nepalicus Frieser, R., 2001^{c g}
- Choragus niger Stephens, 1830^{c}
- Choragus nitens Lec., 1885^{c}
- Choragus nitidipennis Gerh., 1901^{c}
- Choragus ornatus Jordan, 1914^{c}
- Choragus othiodes Frieser, R., 2004^{c g}
- Choragus piceus Schaum, 1845^{c}
- Choragus productus Wolfrum, 1960^{c}
- Choragus pygmaeus Robert in Guer., 1832^{c}
- Choragus rogei Frieser, R., 2002^{c g}
- Choragus sayi LeConte, 1876^{i c b}
- Choragus sheppardi Kirby, 1818^{c}
- Choragus spadiceus Frieser, R., 2000^{c g}
- Choragus strigosus Frieser, 1980^{g}
- Choragus striolatus Valentine, 1998^{i g}
- Choragus subsulcatus Rey, 1893^{c}
- Choragus tertiarius Heyden, C. von & Heyden, L. von., 1866^{c g}
- Choragus theryi Abeille, 1893^{c}
- Choragus velutinus Johraku, 1953^{c}
- Choragus vinsoni Jordan, 1937^{c}
- Choragus vittatus Reitter, 1885^{c}
- Choragus zimmermanni LeConte, 1876^{i c b}

Data sources: i = ITIS, c = Catalogue of Life, g = GBIF, b = Bugguide.net
