= Choragus zimmermanni =

Scientific classification
- Kingdom: Animalia
- Phylum: Arthropoda
- Class: Insecta
- Order: Coleoptera
- Suborder: Polyphaga
- Infraorder: Cucujiformia
- Family: Anthribidae
- Genus: Choragus
- Species: C. zimmermanni

Binomial name
- Choragus zimmermanni LeConte, 1876

Species of beetle

Choragus zimmermanni is a species of fungus weevil in the beetle family Anthribidae. It is found in North America.
