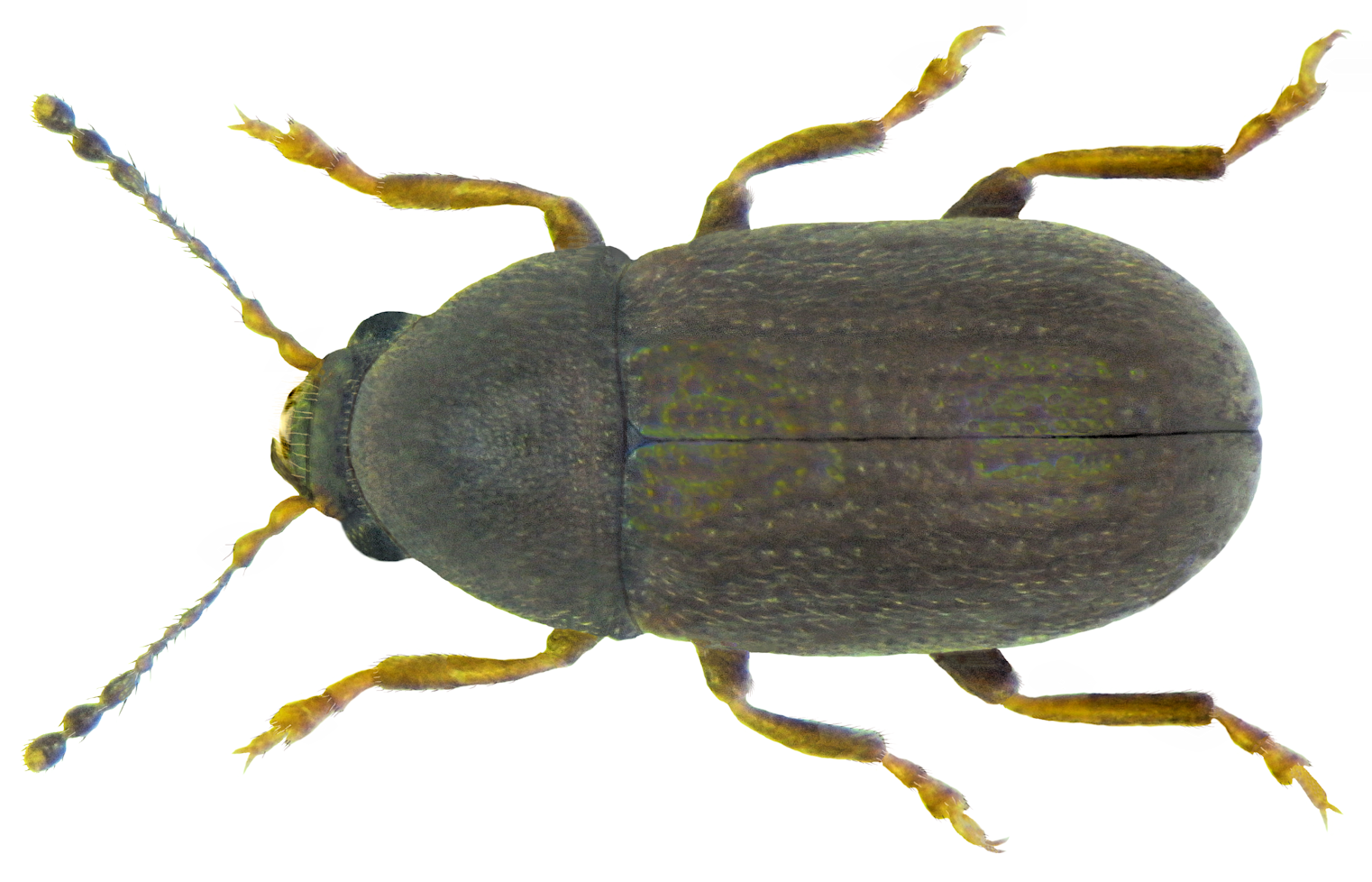
- Choragus sheppardi 1,7-2,4 mm

Scientific classification
- Domain: Eukaryota
- Kingdom: Animalia
- Phylum: Arthropoda
- Class: Insecta
- Order: Coleoptera
- Suborder: Polyphaga
- Infraorder: Cucujiformia
- Family: Anthribidae
- Genus: Choragus
- Species: C. sheppardi

Binomial name
- Choragus sheppardi Kirby, 1819

= Choragus sheppardi =

Species of beetle

Choragus sheppardi is a species of beetle in family Anthribidae. It is found in the Palearctic: Britain, Ireland, France, Northern Central and Eastern Europe, European Russia, Asia Minor, Middle East
