= Ormiscus fasciatus =

Scientific classification
- Kingdom: Animalia
- Phylum: Arthropoda
- Class: Insecta
- Order: Coleoptera
- Suborder: Polyphaga
- Infraorder: Cucujiformia
- Family: Anthribidae
- Genus: Ormiscus
- Species: O. fasciatus

Binomial name
- Ormiscus fasciatus (LeConte, 1884)

Species of beetle

Ormiscus fasciatus is a species of fungus weevil in the beetle family Anthribidae. It is found in North America.
