= Ormiscus =

Scientific classification
- Domain: Eukaryota
- Kingdom: Animalia
- Phylum: Arthropoda
- Class: Insecta
- Order: Coleoptera
- Suborder: Polyphaga
- Infraorder: Cucujiformia
- Family: Anthribidae
- Tribe: Zygaenodini
- Genus: Ormiscus; G. R. Waterhouse, 1845

Genus of beetles

Ormiscus is a genus of fungus weevils in the family Anthribidae. There are at least 60 described species in Ormiscus.

== Species ==
These 60 species belong to the genus Ormiscus:

- Ormiscus aeneus Jordan, 1906
- Ormiscus aequalis Jordan, 1906
- Ormiscus albofasciatus (Schaeffer, 1906)
- Ormiscus alienus Jordan, 1912
- Ormiscus ancora Jordan, 1904
- Ormiscus angulatus Jordan, 1904
- Ormiscus annulifer Jordan, 1904
- Ormiscus approximatus (LeConte, 1876)
- Ormiscus brevis Jordan, 1904
- Ormiscus brunneus Jordan, 1906
- Ormiscus calus Jordan, 1906
- Ormiscus centralis Jordan, 1906
- Ormiscus conis Jordan, 1924
- Ormiscus costifer Jordan, 1904
- Ormiscus costifrons Jordan, 1904
- Ormiscus cupreus Jordan, 1904
- Ormiscus discifer Jordan, 1904
- Ormiscus elegans Jordan, 1906
- Ormiscus eusphyroides Schaeffer, 1906
- Ormiscus fasciatus (LeConte, 1884)
- Ormiscus figuratus Wolfrum, 1953
- Ormiscus fissunguis (LeConte, 1876)
- Ormiscus floridanus (Leng, 1916)
- Ormiscus fuscomaculatus Motschulsky, 1874
- Ormiscus griseus Wolfrum, 1953
- Ormiscus guttatus Jordan, 1906
- Ormiscus irroratus (Schaeffer, 1904)
- Ormiscus lateralis Jordan, 1906
- Ormiscus laticollis Jordan, 1906
- Ormiscus lineatus Jordan, 1904
- Ormiscus lineicollis Wolfrum, 1953
- Ormiscus marmoreus Jordan, 1906
- Ormiscus micula Jordan, 1924
- Ormiscus minor Jordan, 1906
- Ormiscus minutus Wolfrum, 1953
- Ormiscus mitchelli (Pierce, 1930)
- Ormiscus nanus Jordan, 1906
- Ormiscus nigrinus Jordan, 1906
- Ormiscus ornatus Jordan, 1904
- Ormiscus pardus Jordan, 1906
- Ormiscus phaeomelas Jordan, 1906
- Ormiscus piercei Sleeper, 1954
- Ormiscus pusillus (LeConte, 1876)
- Ormiscus quadrimaculatus (Pierce, 1930)
- Ormiscus quercus Schaeffer, 1906
- Ormiscus saltator LeConte, 1876
- Ormiscus sextuberculatus (Schaeffer, 1906)
- Ormiscus solidus Pierce, 1930
- Ormiscus sparsilis Jordan, 1904
- Ormiscus sparsus (Pierce, 1930)
- Ormiscus spilosus Jordan, 1904
- Ormiscus stratus Jordan, 1906
- Ormiscus submetallicus (Schaeffer, 1904)
- Ormiscus subtilis Jordan, 1906
- Ormiscus tener Jordan, 1906
- Ormiscus tigrinus Jordan, 1906
- Ormiscus variegatus Waterhouse, 1845
- Ormiscus variolosus Suffr., 1870
- Ormiscus vasconicus Valentine, 1972
- Ormiscus vulgaris Jordan, 1904
