= Ormiscus sextuberculatus =

Scientific classification
- Domain: Eukaryota
- Kingdom: Animalia
- Phylum: Arthropoda
- Class: Insecta
- Order: Coleoptera
- Suborder: Polyphaga
- Infraorder: Cucujiformia
- Family: Anthribidae
- Genus: Ormiscus
- Species: O. sextuberculatus

Binomial name
- Ormiscus sextuberculatus (Schaeffer, 1906)

Species of beetle

Ormiscus sextuberculatus is a species of fungus weevil in the family Anthribidae. It is found in North America.
