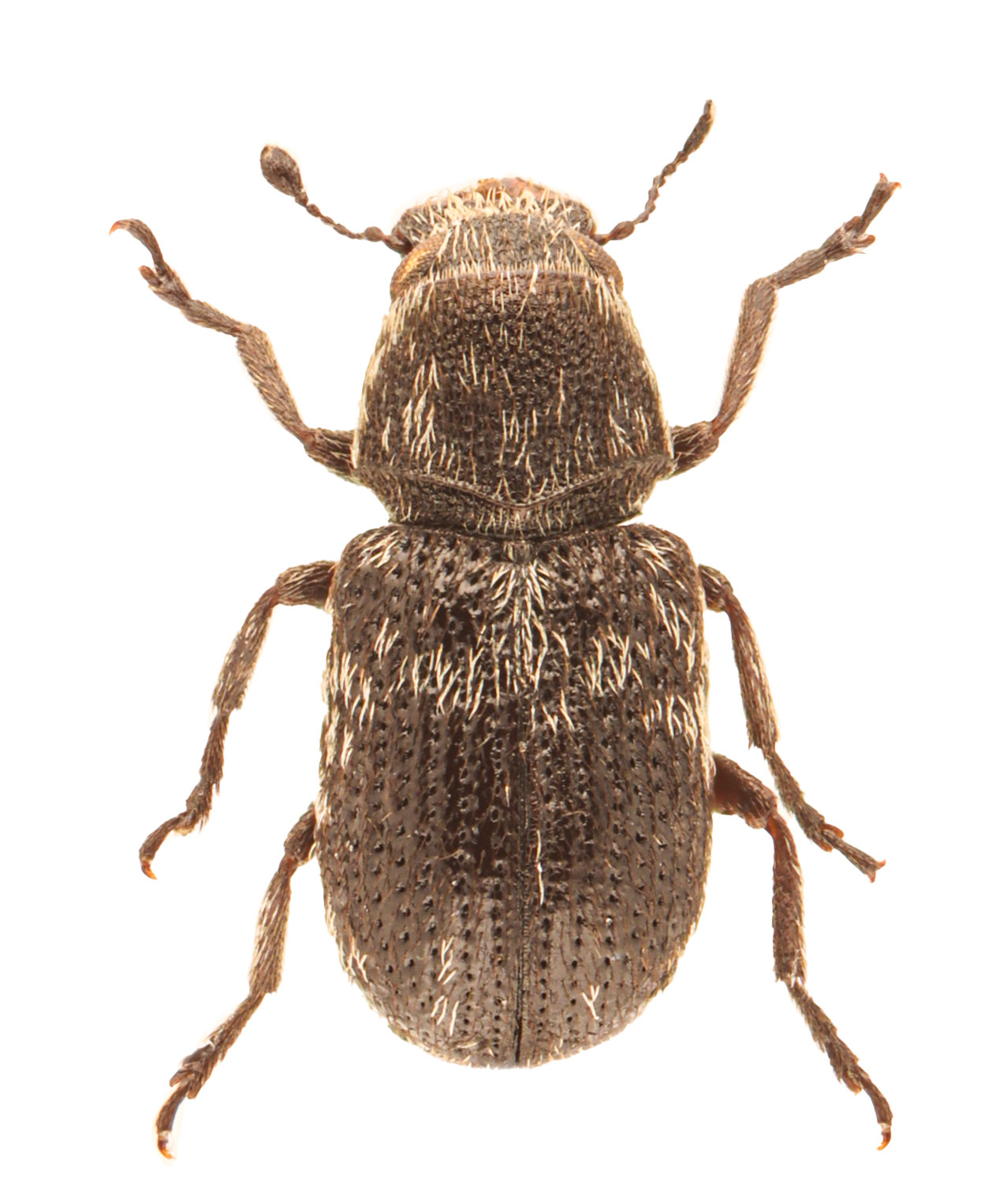

Scientific classification
- Kingdom: Animalia
- Phylum: Arthropoda
- Class: Insecta
- Order: Coleoptera
- Suborder: Polyphaga
- Infraorder: Cucujiformia
- Family: Anthribidae
- Genus: Ormiscus
- Species: O. saltator

Binomial name
- Ormiscus saltator LeConte, 1876

= Ormiscus saltator =

Species of beetle

Ormiscus saltator is a species of fungus weevil in the beetle family Anthribidae. It is found in North America.
