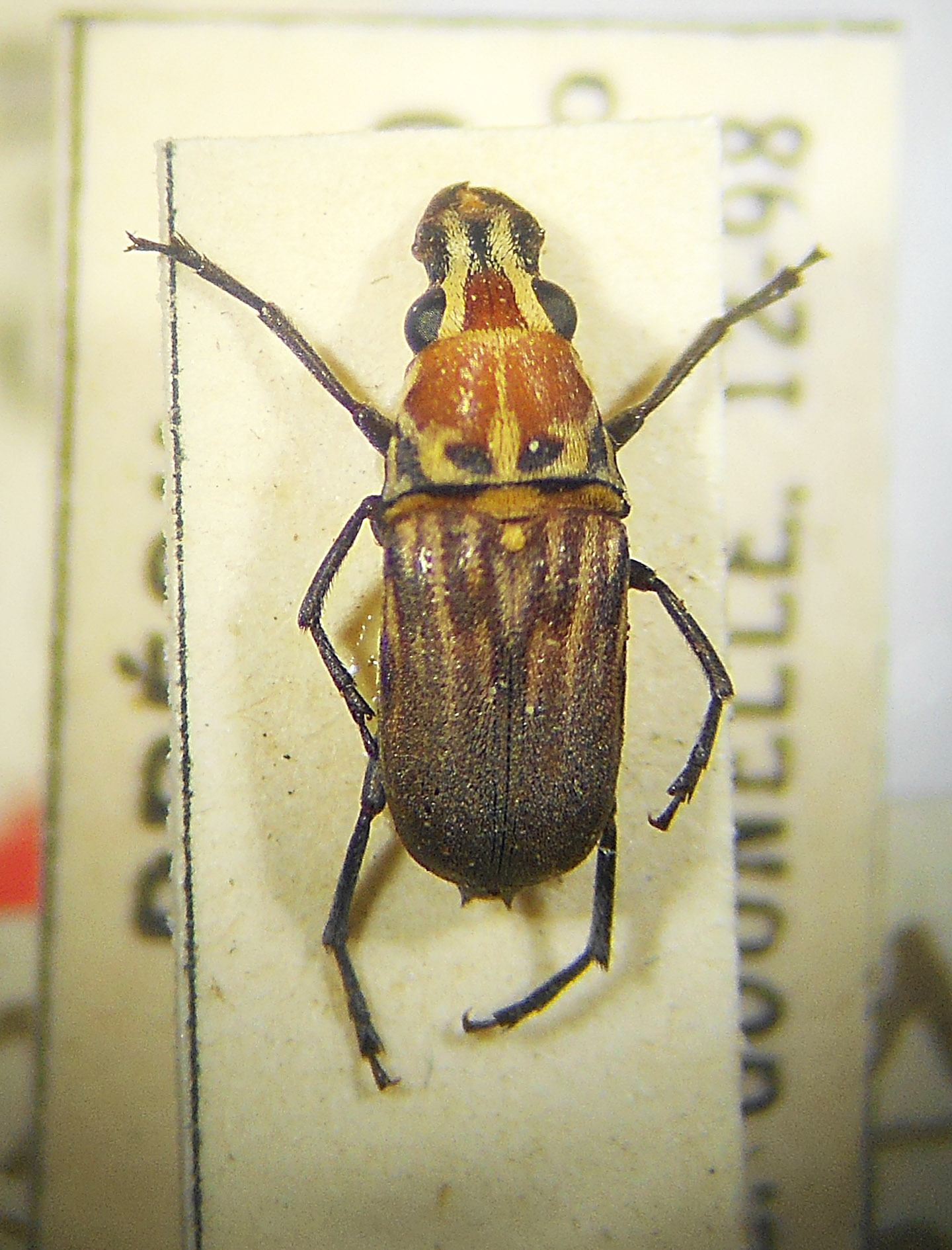
- Gymnognathus comptus

Scientific classification
- Domain: Eukaryota
- Kingdom: Animalia
- Phylum: Arthropoda
- Class: Insecta
- Order: Coleoptera
- Suborder: Polyphaga
- Infraorder: Cucujiformia
- Family: Anthribidae
- Subfamily: Anthribinae
- Genus: Gymnognathus; Schoenherr, 1826

= Gymnognathus =

Genus of beetles

Gymnognathus is a genus of fungus weevils in the beetle family Anthribidae. There are more than 90 described species in Gymnognathus.

== Species ==
These 96 species belong to the genus Gymnognathus:

- Gymnognathus abundans Jordan, 1906
- Gymnognathus acastus Jordan, 1937
- Gymnognathus acutangulus Jordan, 1895
- Gymnognathus ada Jordan, 1904
- Gymnognathus affinis Jordan, 1895
- Gymnognathus alma Jordan, 1904
- Gymnognathus ampulla Jordan, 1906
- Gymnognathus ancora Schoenherr, 1833
- Gymnognathus aulicus Jordan, 1937
- Gymnognathus barclayi Perger & Guerra, 2016
- Gymnognathus bella Jordan, 1904
- Gymnognathus biloris Jordan, 1937
- Gymnognathus blanca Jordan, 1937
- Gymnognathus bohisi Jordan, 1895
- Gymnognathus brevirostris Jordan, 1895
- Gymnognathus bryanthi Jordan, 1937
- Gymnognathus bryanti Jordan, 1937
- Gymnognathus calus Jordan, 1906
- Gymnognathus chiricahuae Sleeper, 1954
- Gymnognathus cincticollis Jordan, 1895
- Gymnognathus clara Jordan, 1904
- Gymnognathus clathratus Jordan, 1895
- Gymnognathus claudia Jordan, 1906
- Gymnognathus clelia Jordan, 1904
- Gymnognathus compar Jordan, 1895
- Gymnognathus comptus Jordan, 1904
- Gymnognathus cordiger Frieser, 1959
- Gymnognathus coronatus Jordan, 1904
- Gymnognathus daguanus Jordan, 1897
- Gymnognathus decorus Perroud, 1853
- Gymnognathus discoideus Klug
- Gymnognathus doris Jordan, 1937
- Gymnognathus dorsonotatus Fahraeus, 1839
- Gymnognathus editha Jordan, 1904
- Gymnognathus elisa Jordan, 1937
- Gymnognathus emma Jordan, 1904
- Gymnognathus erna Jordan, 1904
- Gymnognathus extensus Jordan, 1904
- Gymnognathus fahraei Fahraeus, 1839
- Gymnognathus femoralis Jordan, 1897
- Gymnognathus flexuosus Jordan, 1895
- Gymnognathus germaini Jordan, 1897
- Gymnognathus hamatus Jordan, 1904
- Gymnognathus hedis Jordan, 1937
- Gymnognathus hedys Jordan, 1937
- Gymnognathus helena Jordan, 1904
- Gymnognathus helma Jordan, 1937
- Gymnognathus hetarus Jordan, 1937
- Gymnognathus hilda Jordan, 1904
- Gymnognathus inca Jordan, 1937
- Gymnognathus indagatus Wolfrum, 1931
- Gymnognathus iphis Jordan, 1937
- Gymnognathus iris Jordan, 1937
- Gymnognathus irma Jordan, 1904
- Gymnognathus leucomelas Jordan, 1904
- Gymnognathus libussa Jordan, 1937
- Gymnognathus lotus Jordan, 1937
- Gymnognathus lusia Jordan, 1937
- Gymnognathus lyrestes Jordan, 1937
- Gymnognathus mariana Jordan, 1904
- Gymnognathus martha Jordan, 1904
- Gymnognathus menetriesi Boheman, 1845
- Gymnognathus mexicanus Jordan, 1906
- Gymnognathus molitor Jordan, 1895
- Gymnognathus mollis Jordan, 1937
- Gymnognathus moranus Jordan, 1937
- Gymnognathus nanus Jordan, 1904
- Gymnognathus nebulosus Motschulsky, 1874
- Gymnognathus nica Jordan, 1937
- Gymnognathus nubilus Jordan, 1904
- Gymnognathus ophiopsis Dalman, 1833
- Gymnognathus ornatus Jordan, 1895
- Gymnognathus pentilus Jordan, 1937
- Gymnognathus phanerus Jordan, 1937
- Gymnognathus pindonis Jordan, 1937
- Gymnognathus polius Jordan, 1906
- Gymnognathus procerus Jordan, 1937
- Gymnognathus pulchellus Jordan, 1937
- Gymnognathus pulcher Jordan, 1906
- Gymnognathus regalis Jordan, 1937
- Gymnognathus robustus Jordan, 1895
- Gymnognathus ruficlava Jordan, 1906
- Gymnognathus scalaris Jordan, 1906
- Gymnognathus scolytinus Jordan, 1904
- Gymnognathus signatus Schoenherr, 1823
- Gymnognathus soror Jordan, 1904
- Gymnognathus stigmenus Wolfrum, 1955
- Gymnognathus talis Jordan, 1937
- Gymnognathus tenuis Jordan, 1895
- Gymnognathus thecla Jordan, 1906
- Gymnognathus triangularis Valentine, 1998
- Gymnognathus uta Wolfrum, 1955
- Gymnognathus vanda Jordan, 1937
- Gymnognathus variicornis Jordan, 1895
- Gymnognathus vicinus Jekel, 1855
- Gymnognathus vitticollis Jordan, 1897
