= Gymnognathus triangularis =

Scientific classification
- Domain: Eukaryota
- Kingdom: Animalia
- Phylum: Arthropoda
- Class: Insecta
- Order: Coleoptera
- Suborder: Polyphaga
- Infraorder: Cucujiformia
- Family: Anthribidae
- Genus: Gymnognathus
- Species: G. triangularis

Binomial name
- Gymnognathus triangularis Valentine, 1998

Species of beetle

Gymnognathus triangularis is a species of fungus weevil in the beetle family Anthribidae. It is found in North America.
