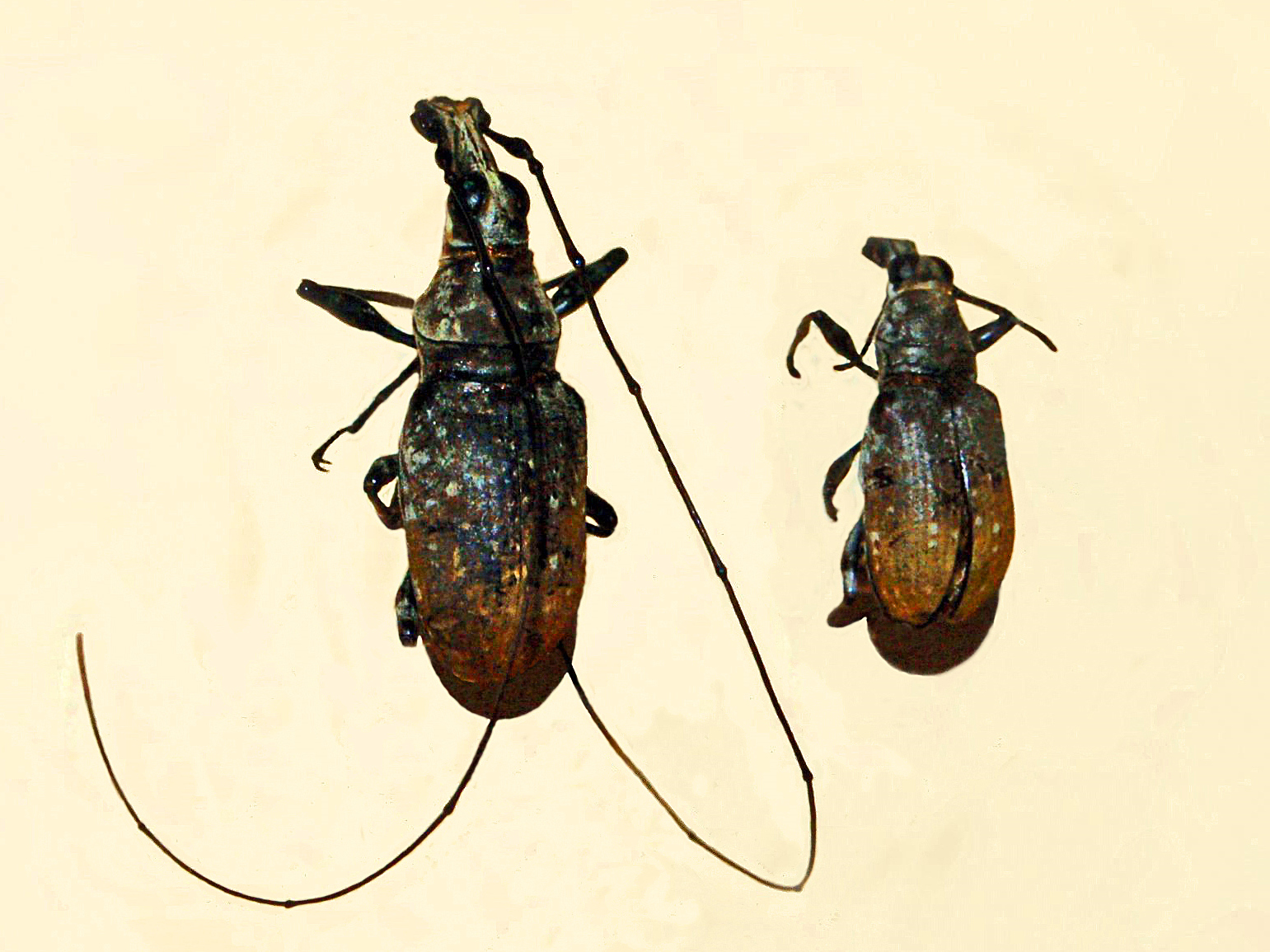
- Mecocerus wallacei from Borneo. Male and female

Scientific classification
- Kingdom: Animalia
- Phylum: Arthropoda
- Class: Insecta
- Order: Coleoptera
- Suborder: Polyphaga
- Infraorder: Cucujiformia
- Family: Anthribidae
- Genus: Mecocerus
- Species: M. wallacei

Binomial name
- Mecocerus wallacei Pascoe, 1860

= Mecocerus wallacei =

Species of beetle

Mecocerus wallacei is a species of beetle belonging to the family Anthribidae.

== Description ==
Mecocerus wallacei exhibits a strong sexual dimorphism, as the males are much larger than females and the thread-like antennae are much longer than the body.

== Distribution ==
This species can be found in Borneo.
