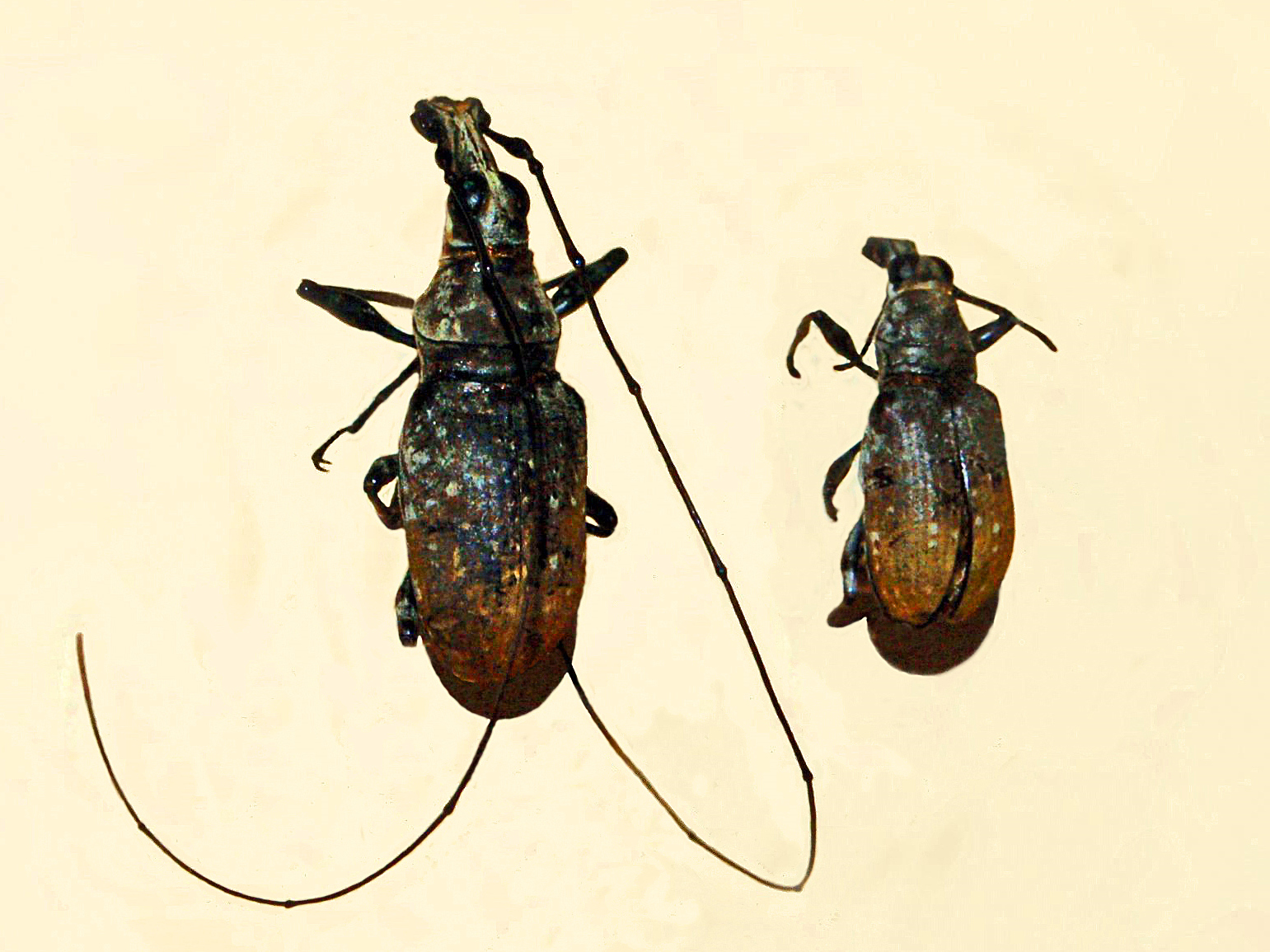
- Mecocerus wallacei from Borneo. Male and female

Scientific classification
- Kingdom: Animalia
- Phylum: Arthropoda
- Class: Insecta
- Order: Coleoptera
- Suborder: Polyphaga
- Infraorder: Cucujiformia
- Family: Anthribidae
- Genus: Mecocerus; Schönherr, 1833

= Mecocerus =

Genus of beetles

Mecocerus is a genus of beetle belonging to the family Anthribidae.

== Selected species ==
- Mecocerus allectus
- Mecocerus asmenus Jordan
- Mecocerus assimilis
- Mecocerus gazella
- Mecocerus rhombeus Quedenfeldt, 1886
- Mecocerus wallacei Pascoe, 1860
