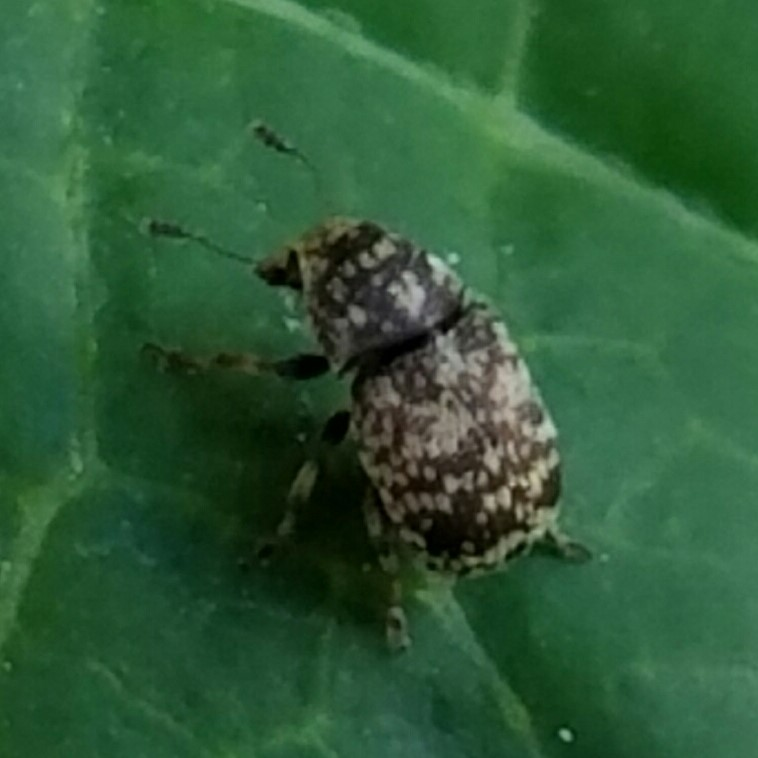

Scientific classification
- Kingdom: Animalia
- Phylum: Arthropoda
- Class: Insecta
- Order: Coleoptera
- Suborder: Polyphaga
- Infraorder: Cucujiformia
- Family: Anthribidae
- Genus: Eusphyrus
- Species: E. walshi

Binomial name
- Eusphyrus walshi LeConte, 1876

= Eusphyrus walshi =

Species of beetle

Eusphyrus walshi is a species of fungus weevil in the beetle family Anthribidae.
