= Eusphyrus eusphyroides =

Scientific classification
- Domain: Eukaryota
- Kingdom: Animalia
- Phylum: Arthropoda
- Class: Insecta
- Order: Coleoptera
- Suborder: Polyphaga
- Infraorder: Cucujiformia
- Family: Anthribidae
- Genus: Eusphyrus
- Species: E. eusphyroides

Binomial name
- Eusphyrus eusphyroides (Schaeffer, 1906)

Species of beetle

Eusphyrus eusphyroides is a species of fungus weevil in the family Anthribidae. It is found in North America.
