= Eusphyrus rectus =

Scientific classification
- Domain: Eukaryota
- Kingdom: Animalia
- Phylum: Arthropoda
- Class: Insecta
- Order: Coleoptera
- Suborder: Polyphaga
- Infraorder: Cucujiformia
- Family: Anthribidae
- Genus: Eusphyrus
- Species: E. rectus

Binomial name
- Eusphyrus rectus Schaeffer, 1906

Species of beetle

Eusphyrus rectus is a species of fungus weevil in the beetle family Anthribidae.
