= Eusphyrus =

Scientific classification
- Kingdom: Animalia
- Phylum: Arthropoda
- Class: Insecta
- Order: Coleoptera
- Suborder: Polyphaga
- Infraorder: Cucujiformia
- Family: Anthribidae
- Tribe: Zygaenodini
- Genus: Eusphyrus; LeConte, 1876

Genus of beetles

Eusphyrus is a genus of fungus weevils in the family Anthribidae. There are at least 30 described species in Eusphyrus.

== Species ==
These 37 species belong to the genus Eusphyrus:

- Eusphyrus analis Jordan, 1906^{c}
- Eusphyrus arizonensis Schaeffer, 1906^{i c}
- Eusphyrus bicolor Jordan, 1906^{c}
- Eusphyrus blanchardi Blackwelder,^{c}
- Eusphyrus brunneus Lacordaire, 1866^{c}
- Eusphyrus circulus Jordan, 1906^{c}
- Eusphyrus dilutus Jordan, 1906^{c}
- Eusphyrus directus Wolfrum, 1929^{c}
- Eusphyrus eusphyroides (Schaeffer, 1906)^{i b}
- Eusphyrus fragilis Jordan, 1906^{c}
- Eusphyrus fuscipennis Wolfrum, 1953^{c}
- Eusphyrus hamatus Jordan, 1904^{c}
- Eusphyrus insignis Jordan, 1906^{c}
- Eusphyrus irpex Jordan, 1906^{c}
- Eusphyrus laetus Suffr., 1870^{c}
- Eusphyrus laevicollis Jordan, 1906^{c}
- Eusphyrus lateralis Jordan, 1904^{c}
- Eusphyrus lioderus Jordan, 1906^{c}
- Eusphyrus minax Jordan, 1906^{c}
- Eusphyrus mucronatus Jordan, 1906^{c}
- Eusphyrus nubilus Jordan, 1904^{c}
- Eusphyrus parvulus Wolfrum, 1953^{c}
- Eusphyrus punctatus Wolfrum, 1959^{c}
- Eusphyrus quercus (Schaeffer, 1906)^{i}
- Eusphyrus rectus Schaeffer, 1906^{i c b}
- Eusphyrus ros Jordan, 1906^{c}
- Eusphyrus rugicollis Jordan, 1906^{c}
- Eusphyrus schwarzi Pierce, 1930^{i c}
- Eusphyrus scutellaris Jordan, 1906^{c}
- Eusphyrus scutosus Jordan, 1906^{c}
- Eusphyrus simplex Jordan, 1906^{c}
- Eusphyrus tenuis Jordan, 1906^{c}
- Eusphyrus tonsor Jordan, 1906^{c}
- Eusphyrus unicolor Jordan, 1906^{c}
- Eusphyrus vestitus Jordan, 1906^{c}
- Eusphyrus walshi LeConte, 1876^{i b}
- Eusphyrus walshii LeConte, J.L., 1876^{c g}

Data sources: i = ITIS, c = Catalogue of Life, g = GBIF, b = Bugguide.net
