= Living fossil =

Organism resembling a form long shown in the fossil records

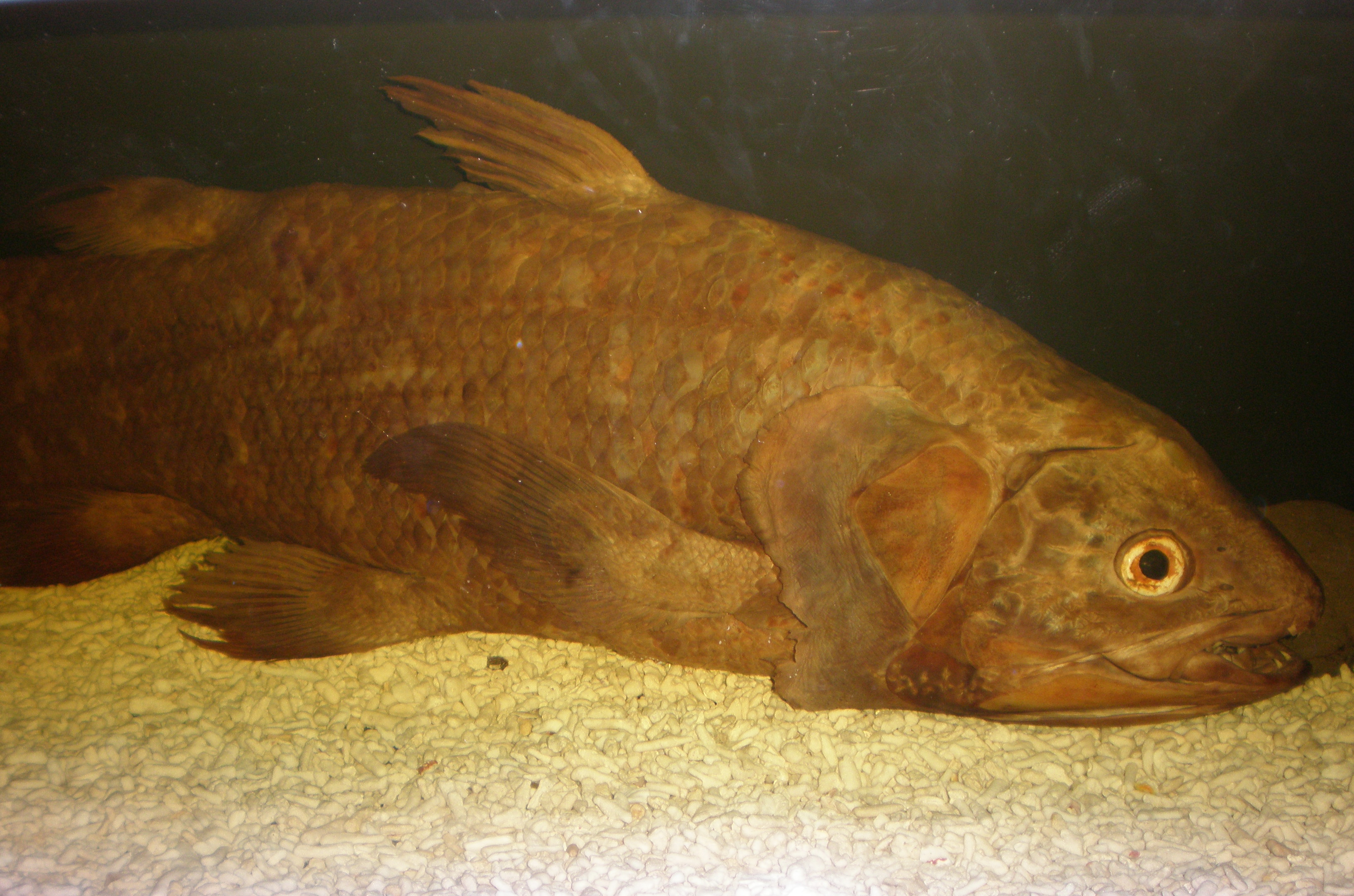
The coelacanths were thought to have gone extinct 66 million years ago, until a living specimen belonging to the order was discovered in 1938.

A living fossil is a term for an extant taxon that phenotypically resembles related species known only from the fossil record, though scientifically the term is deprecated and avoided. To be considered a living fossil, the fossil species must be old relative to the time of origin of the extant clade. Living fossils commonly are of species-poor lineages, but they need not be. While the body plan of a living fossil remains superficially similar, it is never the same species as the remote relatives it resembles, because genetic drift would inevitably change its chromosomal structure.

Living fossils exhibit stasis (also called "bradytely") over geologically long time scales. Popular literature may wrongly claim that a "living fossil" has undergone no significant evolution since fossil times, with practically no molecular evolution or morphological changes. Scientific investigations have repeatedly discredited such claims.

The minimal superficial changes to living fossils are mistakenly declared as an absence of evolution, but they are examples of stabilizing selection, which is an evolutionary process—and perhaps the dominant process of morphological evolution.

The term is currently deprecated among paleontologists and evolutionary biologists.

== Characteristics ==
Fossil and living ginkgos

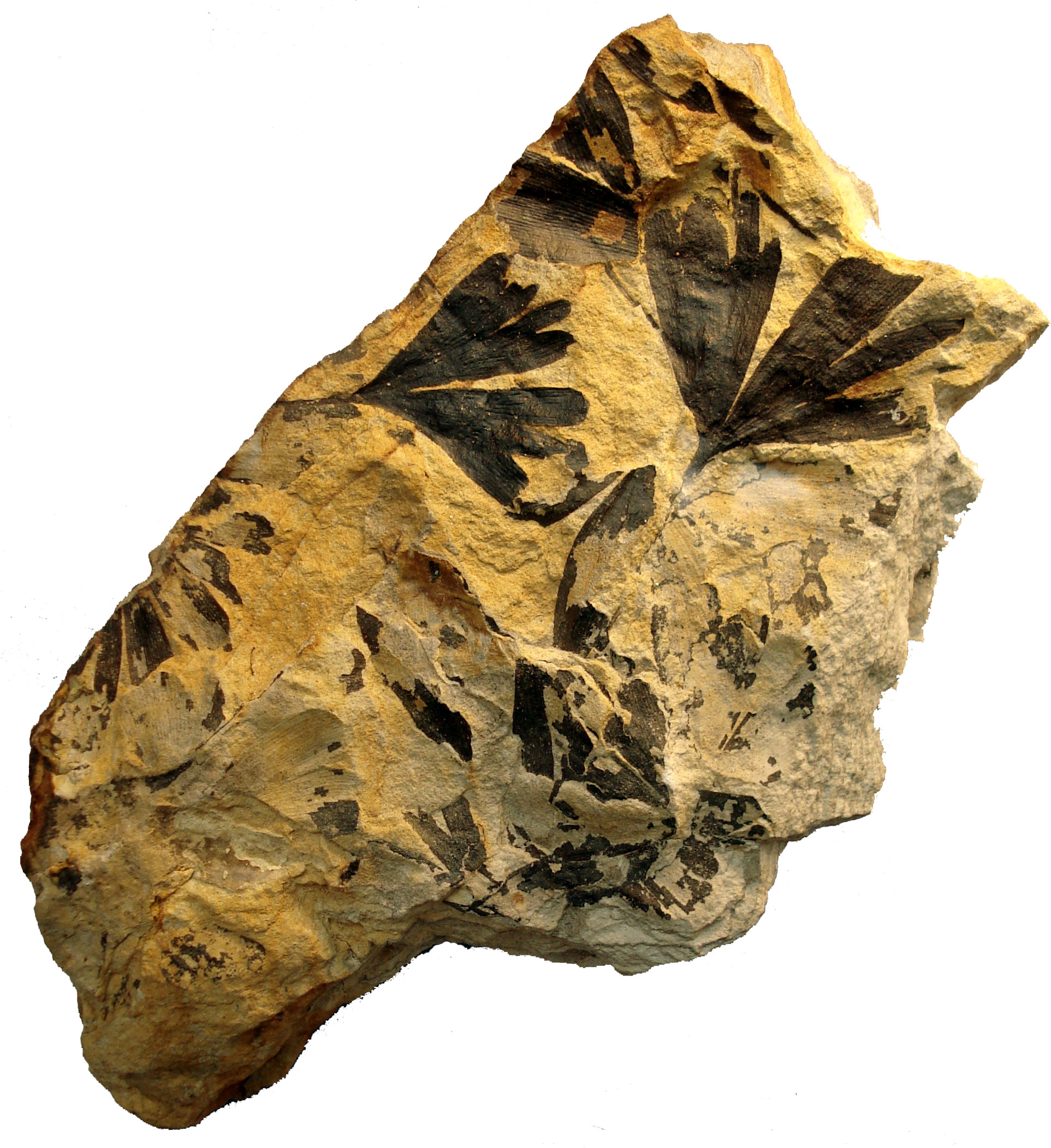
170 million-year-old fossil Ginkgo leaves

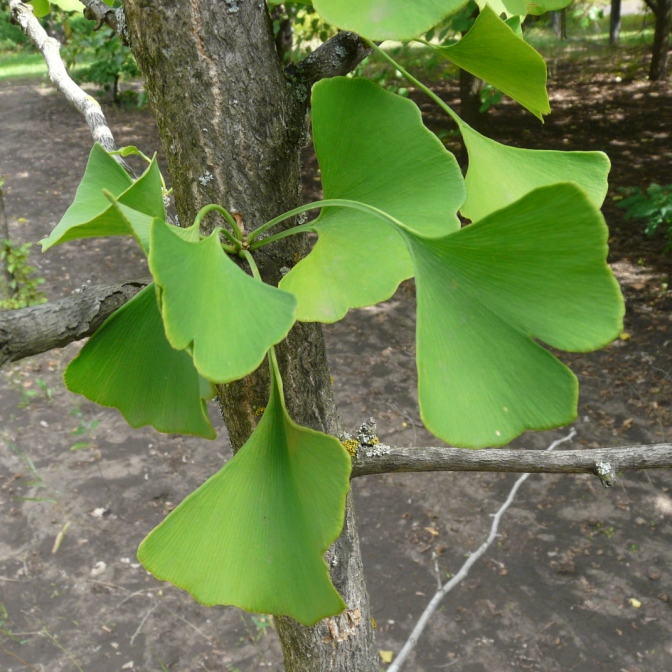
Living Ginkgo biloba plant

Living fossils have two main characteristics, although some have a third:

1. Living organisms that are members of a taxon that has remained recognizable in the fossil record over an unusually long time span.
2. They show little morphological divergence, whether from early members of the lineage, or among extant species.
3. They tend to have little taxonomic diversity.

The first two are required for recognition as a living fossil; some authors also require the third, others merely note it as a frequent trait.

Such criteria are neither well-defined nor clearly quantifiable, but modern methods for analyzing evolutionary dynamics can document the distinctive tempo of stasis. Lineages that exhibit stasis over very short time scales are not considered living fossils; what is poorly defined is the time scale over which the morphology must persist for that lineage to be recognized as a living fossil.

The term living fossil is much misunderstood in popular media in particular, in which it often is used meaninglessly. In professional literature the expression seldom appears and must be used with far more caution, although it has been used inconsistently.

One example of a concept that could be confused with "living fossil" is that of a "Lazarus taxon", but the two are not equivalent; a Lazarus taxon (whether a single species or a group of related species) is one that suddenly reappears, either in the fossil record or in nature, as if the fossil had "come to life again". In contrast to "Lazarus taxa", a living fossil in most senses is a species or lineage that has undergone exceptionally little change throughout a long fossil record, giving the impression that the extant taxon had remained identical through the entire fossil and modern period. Because of the mathematical inevitability of genetic drift, though, the DNA of the modern species is necessarily different from that of its distant, similar-looking ancestor. They almost certainly would not be able to cross-reproduce, and are not the same species.

The average species turnover time, meaning the time between when a species first is established and when it finally disappears, varies widely among phyla, but averages about 2–3 million years. A living taxon that had long been thought to be extinct could be called a Lazarus taxon once it was discovered to be still extant. A dramatic example was the order Coelacanthiformes, of which the genus Latimeria was found to be extant in 1938. About that there is little debate – however, whether Latimeria resembles early members of its lineage sufficiently closely to be considered a living fossil as well as a Lazarus taxon has been denied by some authors in recent years.

Coelacanths disappeared from the fossil record some 80 million years ago (in the upper Cretaceous period) and, to the extent that they exhibit low rates of morphological evolution, extant species qualify as living fossils. It must be emphasised that this criterion reflects fossil evidence, and is totally independent of whether the taxa had been subject to selection at all, which all living populations continuously are, whether they remain genetically unchanged or not.

This apparent stasis, in turn, gives rise to a great deal of confusion – for one thing, the fossil record seldom preserves much more than the general morphology of a specimen. To determine much about its physiology is seldom possible; not even the most dramatic examples of living fossils can be expected to be without changes, no matter how persistently constant their fossils and the extant specimens might seem. To determine much about noncoding DNA is hardly ever possible, but even if a species were hypothetically unchanged in its physiology, it is to be expected from the very nature of the reproductive processes, that its non-functional genomic changes would continue at more-or-less standard rates. Hence, a fossil lineage with apparently constant morphology need not imply equally constant physiology, and certainly neither implies any cessation of the basic evolutionary processes such as natural selection, nor reduction in the usual rate of change of the noncoding DNA.

Some living fossils are taxa that were known from palaeontological fossils before living representatives were discovered. The most famous examples of this are:

- Coelacanthiform fishes (2 species)
- Metasequoia, the dawn redwood discovered in a remote Chinese valley (1 species)
- Glypheoid lobsters (2 species)
- Mymarommatid wasps (10 species)
- Eomeropid scorpionflies (1 species)
- Jurodid beetles (1 species)
- Soft sea urchins (59 species)

All the above include taxa that originally were described as fossils but now are known to include still-extant species.

Other examples of living fossils are single living species that have no close living relatives, but are survivors of large and widespread groups in the fossil record. For example:

- Wollemia nobilis
- Ginkgo biloba
- Syntexis libocedrii, the cedar wood wasp
- Dinoflagellates (typified on coccoid dinocysts: occasionally calcareous cell remnants)

All of these were described from fossils before later being found alive.

The fact that a living fossil is a surviving representative of an archaic lineage does not imply that it must retain all the "primitive" features (plesiomorphies) of its ancestral lineage. Although it is common to say that living fossils exhibit "morphological stasis", stasis, in the scientific literature, does not mean that any species is strictly identical to its ancestor, much less remote ancestors.

Some living fossils are relicts of formerly diverse and morphologically varied lineages, but not all survivors of ancient lineages necessarily are regarded as living fossils. See for example the uniquely and highly autapomorphic oxpeckers, which appear to be the only survivors of an ancient lineage related to starlings and mockingbirds.

== Evolution and living fossils ==
The term living fossil is usually reserved for species or larger clades that are exceptional for their lack of morphological diversity and their exceptional conservatism, and several hypotheses could explain morphological stasis on a geologically long time-scale. Early analyses of evolutionary rates emphasized the persistence of a taxon rather than rates of evolutionary change. Contemporary studies instead analyze rates and modes of phenotypic evolution, but most have focused on clades that are thought to be adaptive radiations rather than on those thought to be living fossils. Thus, very little is presently known about the evolutionary mechanisms that produce living fossils or how common they might be. Some recent studies have documented exceptionally low rates of ecological and phenotypic evolution despite rapid speciation. This has been termed a "non-adaptive radiation" referring to diversification not accompanied by adaptation into various significantly different niches. Such radiations are explanation for groups that are morphologically conservative. Persistent adaptation within an adaptive zone is a common explanation for morphological stasis. The subject of very low evolutionary rates, however, has received much less attention in the recent literature than that of high rates.

Living fossils are not expected to exhibit exceptionally low rates of molecular evolution, and some studies have shown that they do not. For example, on tadpole shrimp (Triops), one article notes, "Our work shows that organisms with conservative body plans are constantly radiating, and presumably, adapting to novel conditions... I would favor retiring the term 'living fossil' altogether, as it is generally misleading." Some scientists instead prefer a new term stabilomorph, being defined as "an effect of a specific formula of adaptative strategy among organisms whose taxonomic status does not exceed genus-level. A high effectiveness of adaptation significantly reduces the need for differentiated phenotypic variants in response to environmental changes and provides for long-term evolutionary success."

The question posed by several recent studies pointed out that the morphological conservatism of coelacanths is not supported by paleontological data. In addition, it was shown in the 2010s that studies concluding that a slow rate of molecular evolution is linked to morphological conservatism in coelacanths are biased by the a priori hypothesis that these species are "living fossils". Accordingly, the genome stasis hypothesis is challenged by the recent finding that the genome of the two extant coelacanth species L. chalumnae and L. menadoensis contain multiple species-specific insertions, indicating transposable element recent activity and contribution to post-speciation genome divergence. Such studies, however, challenge only a genome stasis hypothesis, not the hypothesis of exceptionally low rates of phenotypic evolution.

== History ==
The term was coined by Charles Darwin in his On the Origin of Species from 1859, when discussing Ornithorhynchus (the platypus) and Lepidosiren (the South American lungfish):

All fresh-water basins, taken together, make a small area compared with that of the sea or of the land; and, consequently, the competition between fresh-water productions will have been less severe than elsewhere; new forms will have been more slowly formed, and old forms more slowly exterminated. And it is in fresh water that we find seven genera of Ganoid fishes, remnants of a once preponderant order: and in fresh water we find some of the most anomalous forms now known in the world, as the Ornithorhynchus and Lepidosiren, which, like fossils, connect to a certain extent orders now widely separated in the natural scale. These anomalous forms may almost be called living fossils; they have endured to the present day, from having inhabited a confined area, and from having thus been exposed to less severe competition.

— On the Origin of Species, 1859

=== Other definitions ===
==== Long-enduring ====
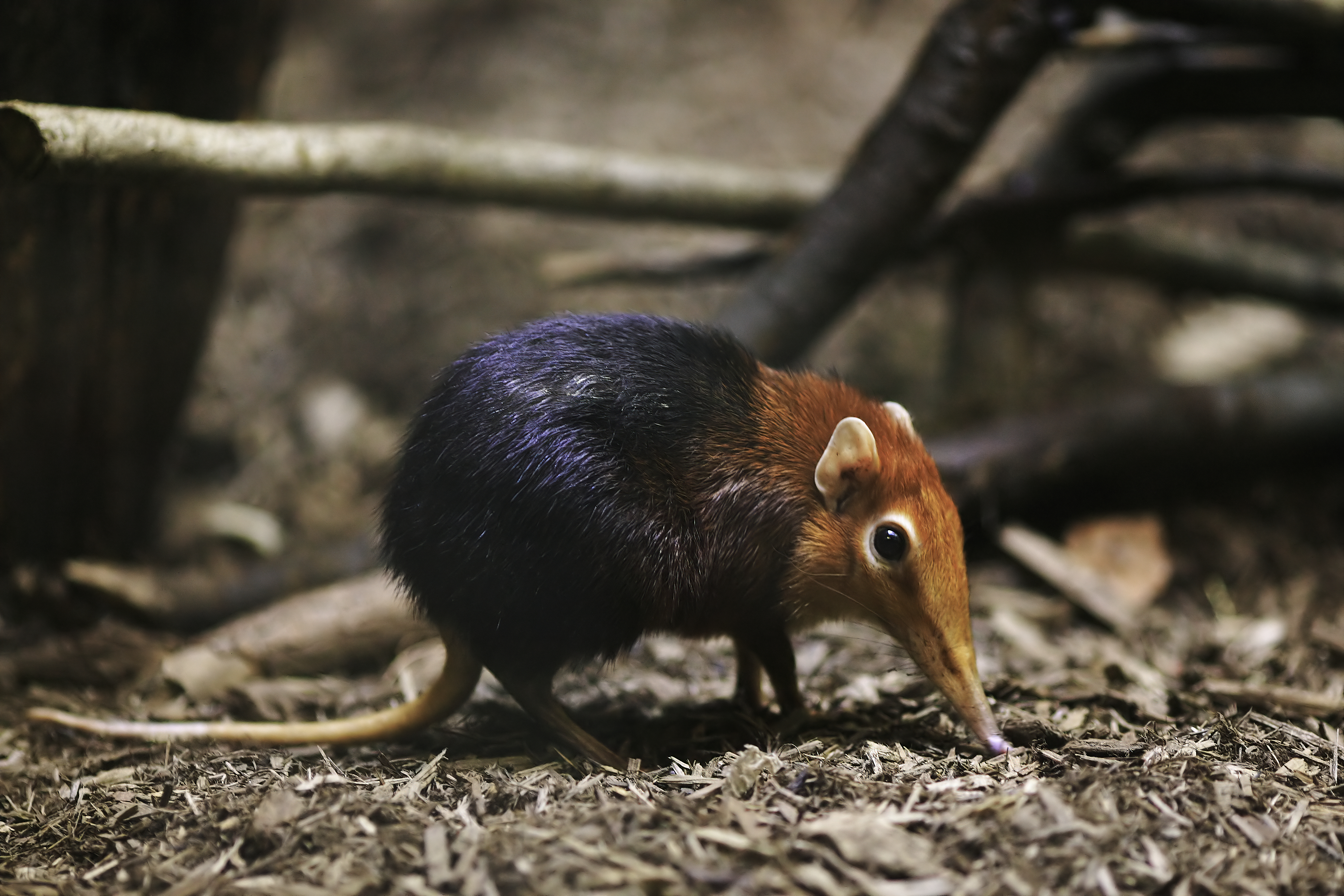
Elephant shrews resemble the extinct Leptictidium of Eocene Europe.

A living taxon that lived through a large portion of geologic time.

The Australian lungfish (Neoceratodus fosteri), also known as the Queensland lungfish, is an example of an organism that meets this criterion. Fossils identical to modern specimens have been dated at over 100 million years old. Modern Queensland lungfish have existed as a species for almost 30 million years. The contemporary nurse shark has existed for more than 112 million years, making this species one of the oldest, if not actually the oldest extant vertebrate species.

==== Resembles ancient species ====
A living taxon morphologically or physiologically resembling a fossil taxon through a large portion of geologic time (morphological stasis).

==== Retains many ancient traits ====
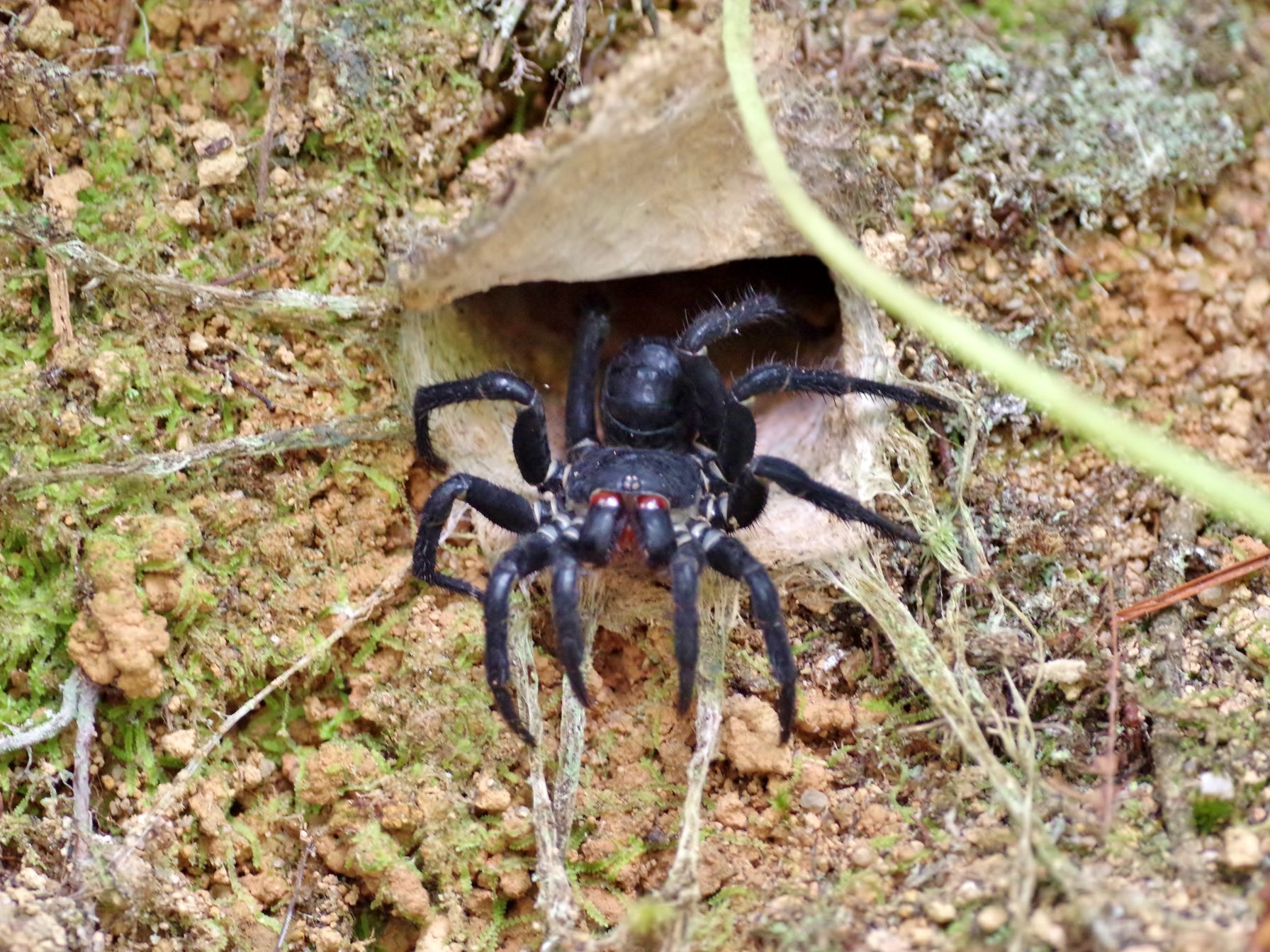
More primitive trapdoor spiders, such as this Liphistius malayanus, have segmented plates on the dorsal surface of the abdomen and cephalothorax, a character shared with scorpions, making it probable that after the spiders diverged from the scorpions, the earliest unique ancestor of trapdoor species was the first to split off from the lineage that contains all other extant spiders.

A living taxon with many characteristics believed to be primitive. This is a more neutral definition. However, it does not make it clear whether the taxon is truly old, or it simply has many plesiomorphies. Note that, as mentioned above, the converse may hold for true living fossil taxa; that is, they may possess a great many derived features (autapomorphies), and not be particularly "primitive" in appearance.

==== Relict population ====
Any one of the above three definitions, but also with a relict distribution in refuges.

Some paleontologists believe that living fossils with large distributions (such as Triops cancriformis) are not real living fossils. In the case of Triops cancriformis (living from the Triassic until now), the Triassic specimens lost most of their appendages (mostly only carapaces remain), and they have not been thoroughly examined since 1938.

==== Low diversity ====
Any of the first three definitions, but the clade also has a low taxonomic diversity (low diversity lineages).

Oxpeckers are morphologically somewhat similar to starlings due to shared plesiomorphies, but are uniquely adapted to feed on parasites and blood of large land mammals, which has always obscured their relationships. This lineage forms part of a radiation that includes Sturnidae and Mimidae, but appears to be the most ancient of these groups. Biogeography strongly suggests that oxpeckers originated in eastern Asia and only later arrived in Africa, where they now have a relict distribution.

The two living species thus seem to represent an entirely extinct and (as Passerida go) rather ancient lineage, as certainly as this can be said in the absence of actual fossils. The latter is probably due to the fact that the oxpecker lineage never occurred in areas where conditions were good for fossilization of small bird bones, but of course, fossils of ancestral oxpeckers may one day turn up enabling this theory to be tested.

=== Operational definition ===
An operational definition was proposed in 2017, where a 'living fossil' lineage has a slow rate of evolution and occurs close to the middle of morphological variation (the centroid of morphospace) among related taxa (i.e. a species is morphologically conservative among relatives). The scientific accuracy of the morphometric analyses used to classify tuatara as a living fossil under this definition have been criticised however, which prompted a rebuttal from the original authors.

== Examples ==
Some of these are informally known as "living fossils".

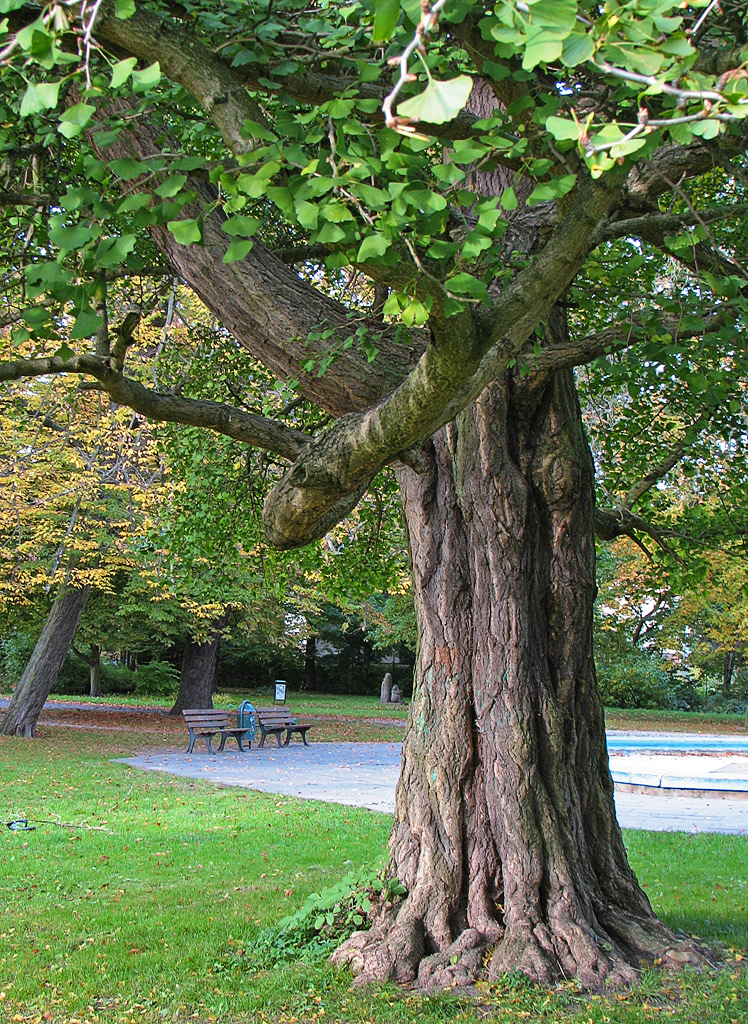
Ginkgos not only have existed for a long time, but also have a long life span, with some having an age of over 2,500 years. Six specimens survived the atomic bombing of Hiroshima, 1 to 2 kilometers from ground zero. They still live there today.

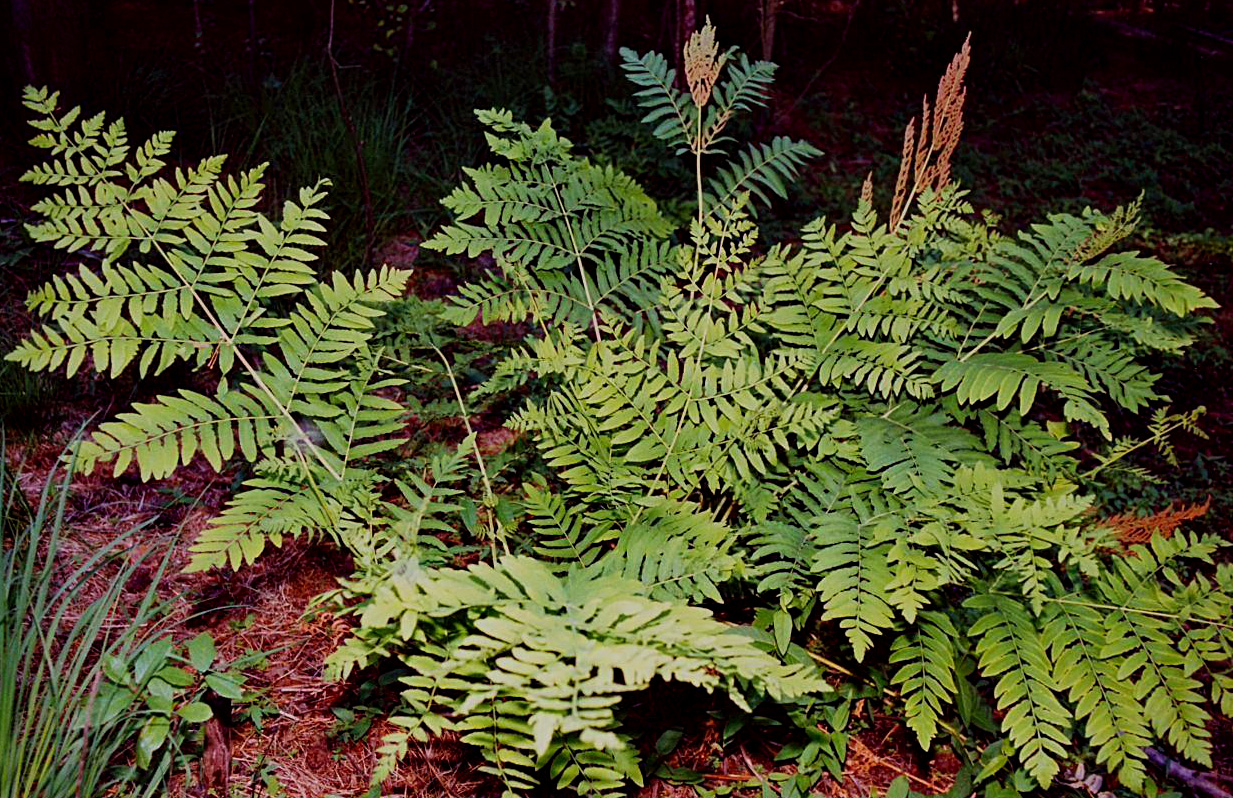
Ferns were the dominant plant group in the Jurassic period, with some species, such as Osmunda claytoniana, maintaining evolutionary stasis for at least 180 million years.

=== Protists ===
- The dinoflagellate †Calciodinellum operosum.
- The dinoflagellate †Dapsilidinium pastielsii.
- The dinoflagellate †Posoniella tricarinelloides.
- The coccolithophore Tergestiella adriatica.

=== Plants ===
- Moss
- Pteridophytes
  - Horsetails – Equisetum
  - Lycopods
  - Tree ferns and ferns
- Gymnosperms
  - Conifers
    - Agathis – kauri in New Zealand, Australia and the Pacific and almasiga in the Philippines
    - Araucaria araucana – the monkey puzzle tree (as well as other extant Araucaria species)
    - Sequoioideae - Redwoods (includes the Coast redwood, Sierra redwood and Dawn redwood).
    - Sciadopitys – a unique conifer endemic to Japan known in the fossil record for about 230 million years.
    - Taiwania cryptomerioides – one of the largest tree species in Asia.
    - Welwitschia
    - Wollemia tree (Araucariaceae – a borderline example, related to Agathis and Araucaria)
  - Cycads – although this has been challenged by multiple lines of evidence
  - Ginkgo tree (Ginkgoaceae)
- Angiosperms
  - Amborella – a plant from New Caledonia, possibly closest to base of the flowering plants
  - Magnolia – a genus whose form is little changed since the earliest days of flowering plant evolution in the Cretaceous and possibly earlier
  - Trapa – water caltrops, seeds, and leaves of numerous extinct species are known all the way back to the Cretaceous.
  - Nelumbo – several species of lotus flower are known exclusively from fossils dating back to the Cretaceous.
  - Nymphaeales — includes water lilies; fossils date back to Cretaceous period
  - Laurels – The Laurel family (Lauraceae) includes some of the oldest angiosperms in the fossil record. Fossils of many modern genera such as Sassafras go back to the Late Cretaceous.
  - Platanus Sycamore (Plane tree) fossils are very abundant throughout the northern hemisphere with several extinct species. Sycamore leaves and fruits are quite common in plant fossils. They are known from the Cretaceous onwards. Sycamores exhibit many primitive features as well such their exfoliating bark which is a result of a lack of elasticity. Platanus occidentalis fossils are known from the Pliocene and the Pleistocene in North America.
  - Nyssa Blackgum fossils go way back to the late Cretaceous period. Many extinct species are recorded as well.
  - Liriodendron Fossils from the Cretaceous and the Tertiary period are found with many extinct species. Tulip trees at one point were present in Europe during the Cretaceous and the early Paleocene. Liriodendron tulipifera fossils dating from the Pliocene and Pleistocene were discovered at the Chowan formation in North Carolina.
  - Liquidambar Sweetgums appeared during the mid-late Cretaceous and several extinct species are found throughout Asia, Europe and North America. The genus was once widespread in Europe and Asia especially during the Miocene. The American sweetgum is a living fossil itself since fossil specimens dating from the Miocene, Pliocene and Pleistocene were discovered in the eastern United States

=== Fungi ===
- Neolecta

=== Animals ===
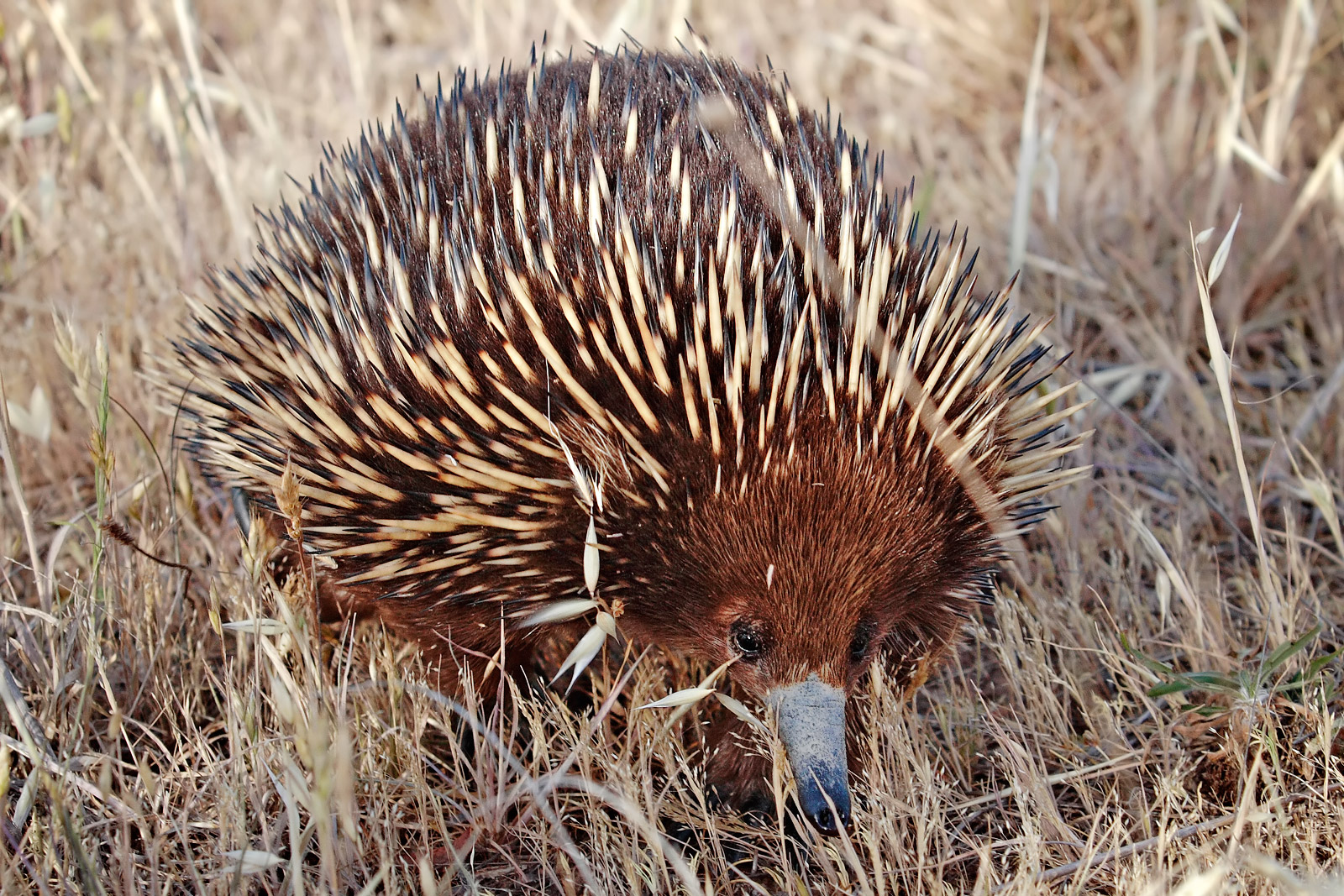
Echidnas are one of few mammals to lay eggs.

Vertebrates

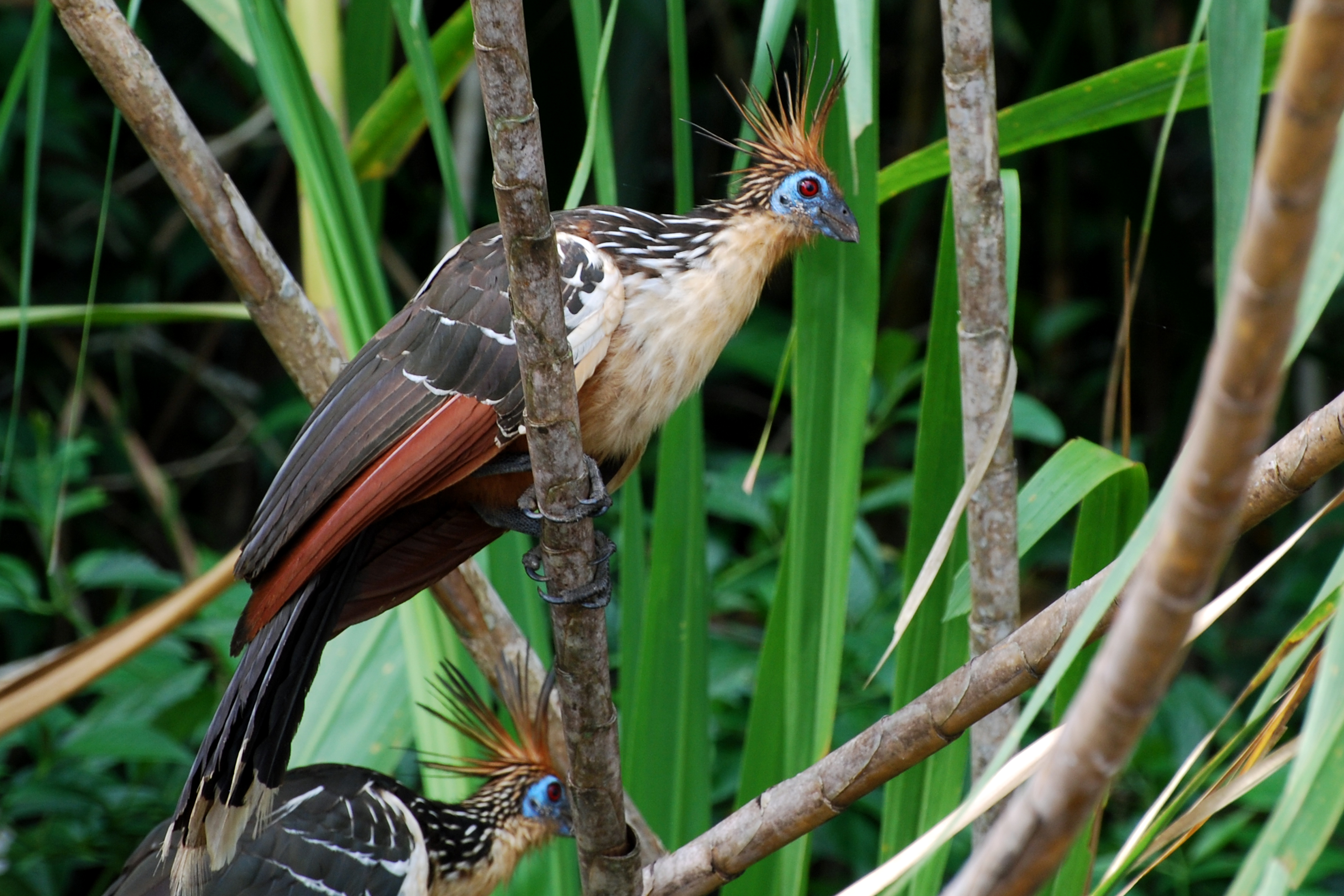
Hoatzin hatch with two visible claws on their wings, but the claws fall out once the birds reach maturity.

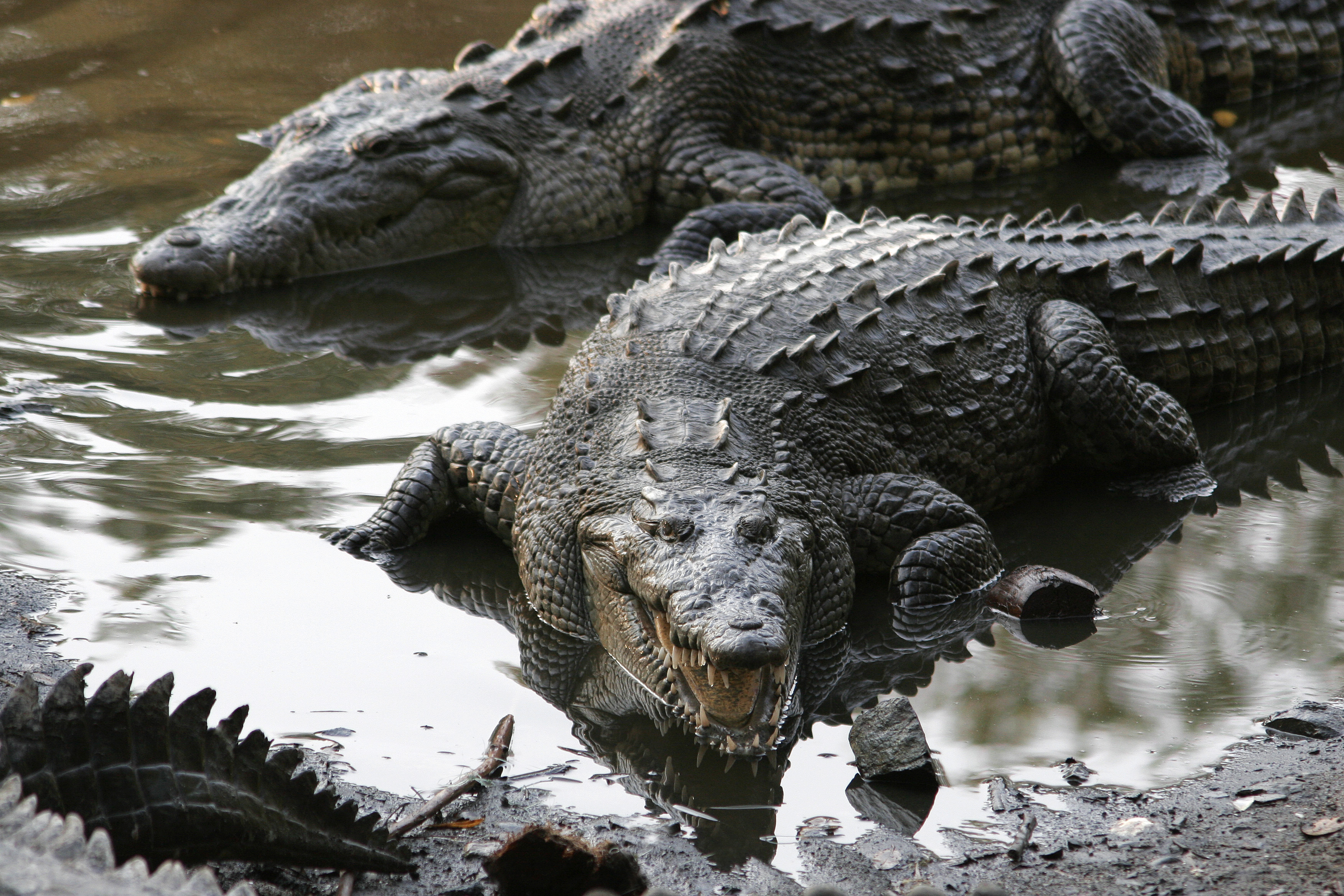
Crocodilians survived the K–Pg extinction event that killed off the non-avian dinosaurs.

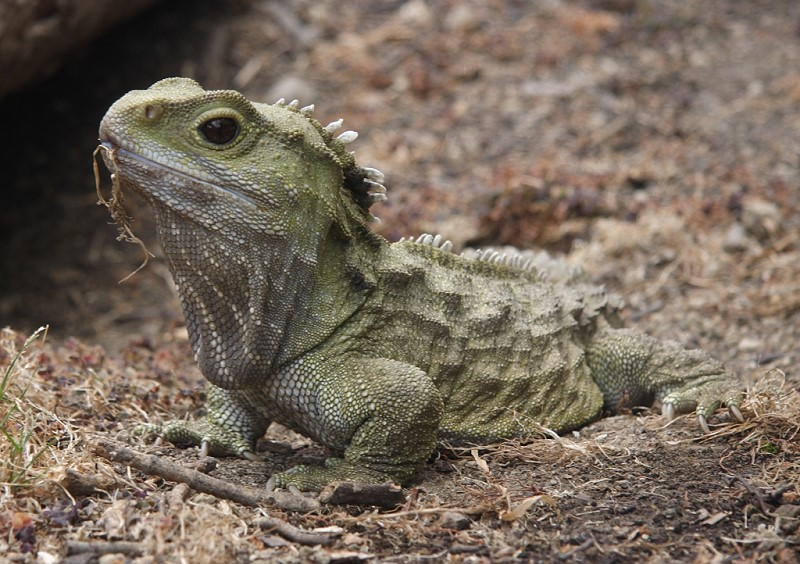
Tuatara are reptiles, yet retain more primitive characteristics than lizards and snakes.

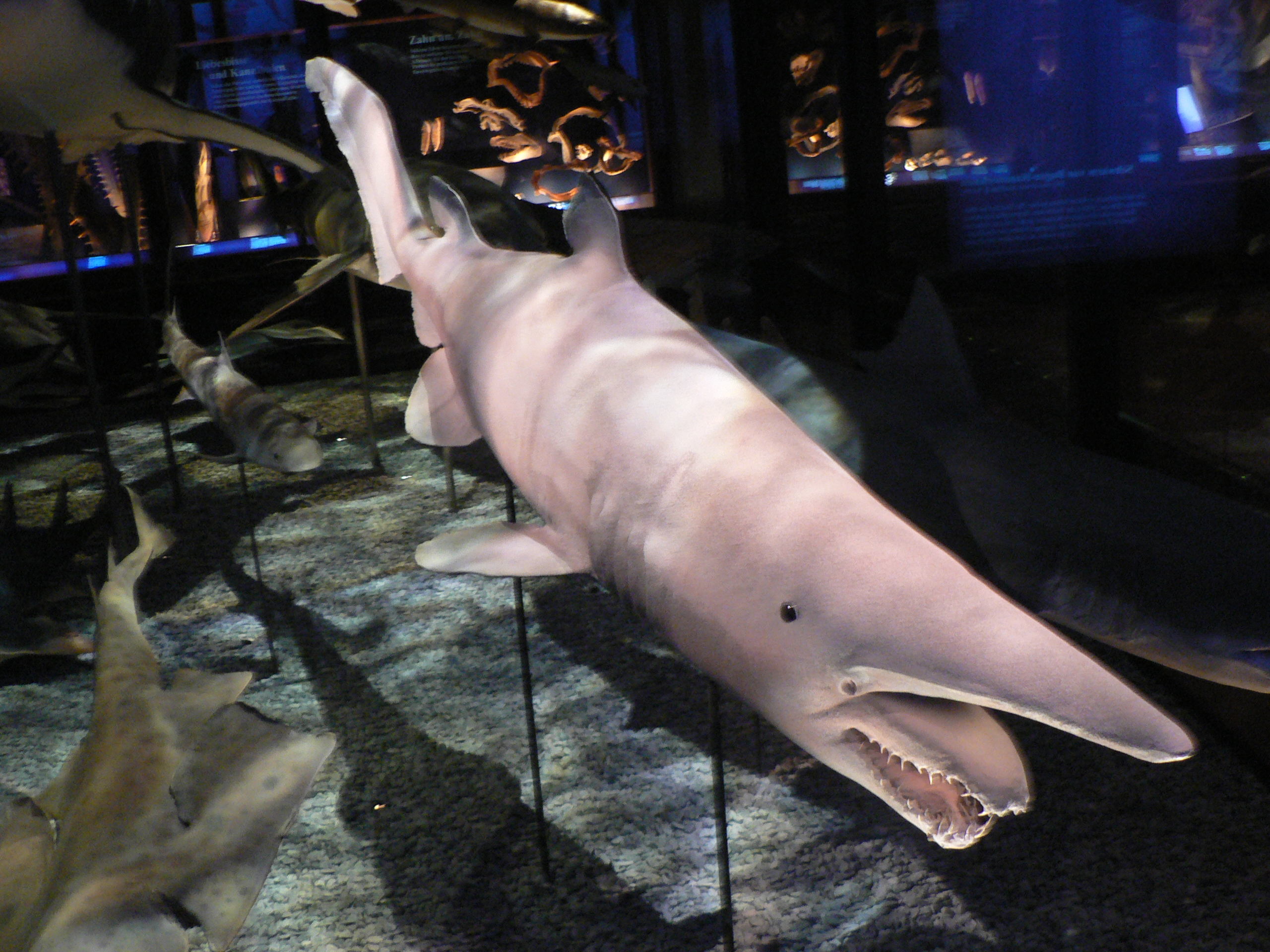
The goblin shark is the only extant representative of the family Mitsukurinidae, a lineage some 125 million years old (early Cretaceous).

- Mammals
  - Aardvark (Orycteropus afer)
  - Elephant shrew (Macroscelidea)
  - Solenodon (Solenodon cubanus and Solenodon paradoxus)
  - Monotremes (the platypus and echidna)
  - Carnivorans
    - Clouded leopard (Neofelis nebulousa)
    - Giant panda (Ailuropoda melanoleuca)
    - Bush dog (Speothos venaticus)
    - Maned wolf (Chrysocyon brachyurus)
    - Hawaiian monk seal (Neomonachus schauinslandi)
    - Spectacled bear (Tremarctos ornatus)
    - Red panda (Ailurus fulgens)
  - Cetaceans
    - Baiji (Lipotes vexillifer) (One living species)
    - Ganges river dolphin (Platanista gangetica)
    - Indus river dolphin (Platanista minor)
    - False killer whale (Pseudorca crassidens)
    - Pygmy right whale (Caperea marginata)
  - Lagomorphs
    - Amami rabbit (Pentalagus furnessi)
    - Nesolagus (Asian striped rabbits)
  - Marsupials
    - Opossums (Didelphidae)
    - Koala (Phascolarctos cinereus)
    - Monito del monte (Dromiciops gliroides)
    - Shrew opossum (Caenolestidae)
  - Rodents
    - Mountain beaver (Aplodontia rufa)
    - Laotian rock rat (Laonastes aenigmamus)
    - Pacarana (Dinomys branickii)
  - Ungulates
    - Chevrotain (Tragulidae)
    - Chousingha (Tetracerus quadricornis)
    - Rhinoceroses (Rhinocerotidae)
    - Okapi (Okapia johnstoni)
    - Tapirs (Tapiridae)
- Birds
  - Pelicans (Pelecanus) – form has been virtually unchanged since the Eocene, and is noted to have been even more conserved across the Cenozoic than that of crocodiles.
  - Coliiformes (mousebirds) – 6 living species in 2 genera, distinct neoavian lineage.
  - Hoatzin (Ophisthocomus hoazin) – One living species, distinct neoavian lineage.
  - Sandhill crane (Antigone canadensis) – Oldest living species.
  - Seriema (Cariamidae) – 2 living species, sole living cariamiform bird.
  - Tinamiformes (tinamous) 50 living species. Distinct lineage of Palaeognathae.
  - Passerines:
    - Acanthisittidae (New Zealand "wrens") – 2 living species, a few more recently extinct.
    - Broad-billed sapayoa (Sapayoa aenigma)
    - Bearded reedling (Panurus biarmicus)
    - Picathartes (rockfowl)
  - Waterfowl:
    - Magpie goose (Anseranas semipalmata).
    - Screamers (family Anhimidae)
- Reptiles
  - Crocodilia (crocodiles, gavials, caimans and alligators)
  - Sunbeam snake (Xenopeltis hainanensis and Xenopeltis unicolor)
  - Tuatara (Sphenodon punctatus and Sphenodon guntheri)
  - Turtles
    - Pig-nosed turtle (Carettochelys insculpta)
    - Hickatee (Dermatemys mawii)
    - Snapping turtle (Chelydridae) family
    - Asian forest tortoise (Manouria emys)
    - Impressed tortoise (Manouria impressa)
    - Leatherback sea turtle (Dermochelys coriacea)
- Amphibians
  - Giant salamanders (Cryptobranchus and Andrias)
  - Hula painted frog (Latonia nigriventer)
  - Purple frog (Nasikabatrachus sahyadrensis)

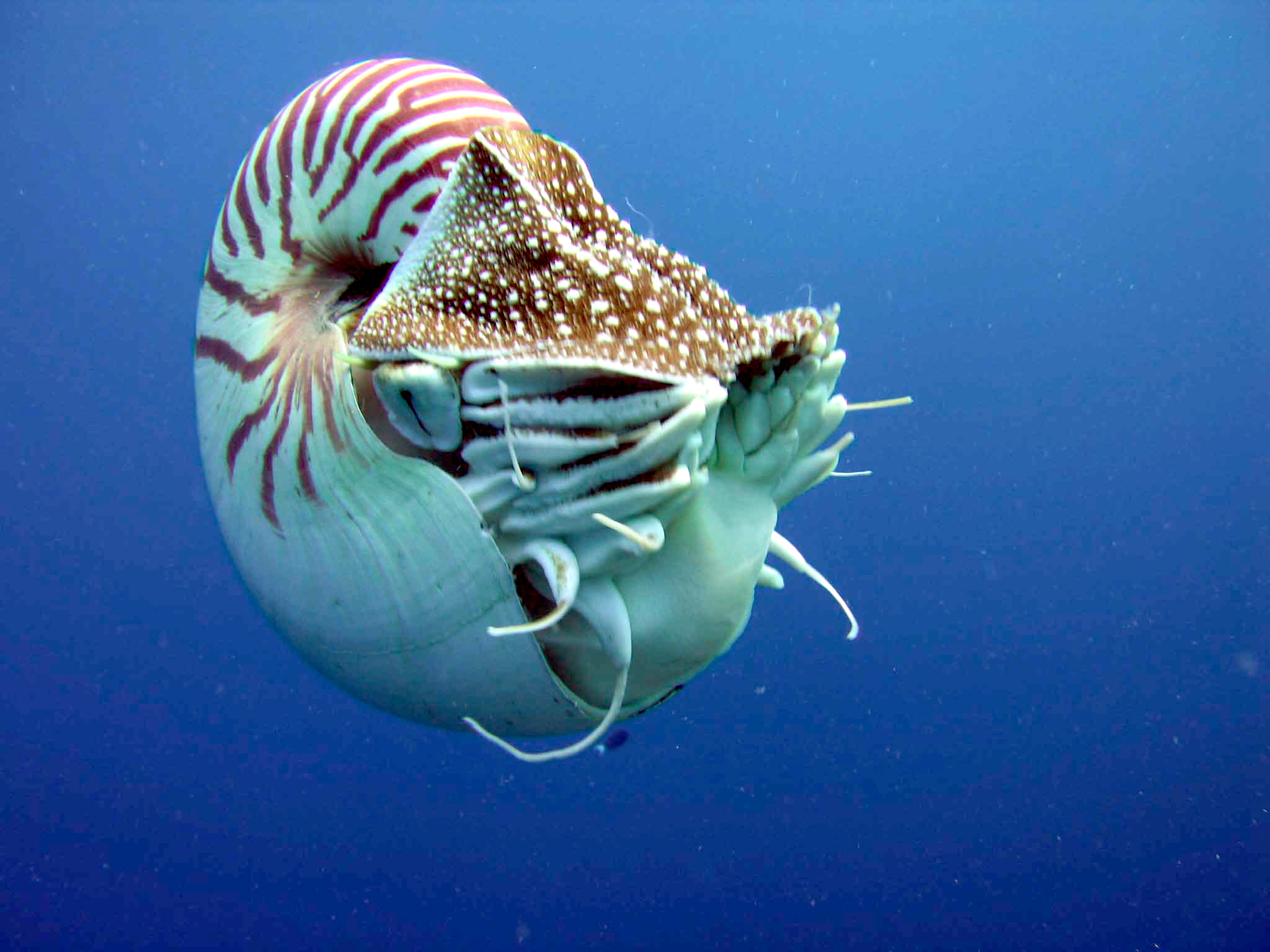
Nautilus retain the external spiral shell that its other relatives have lost.

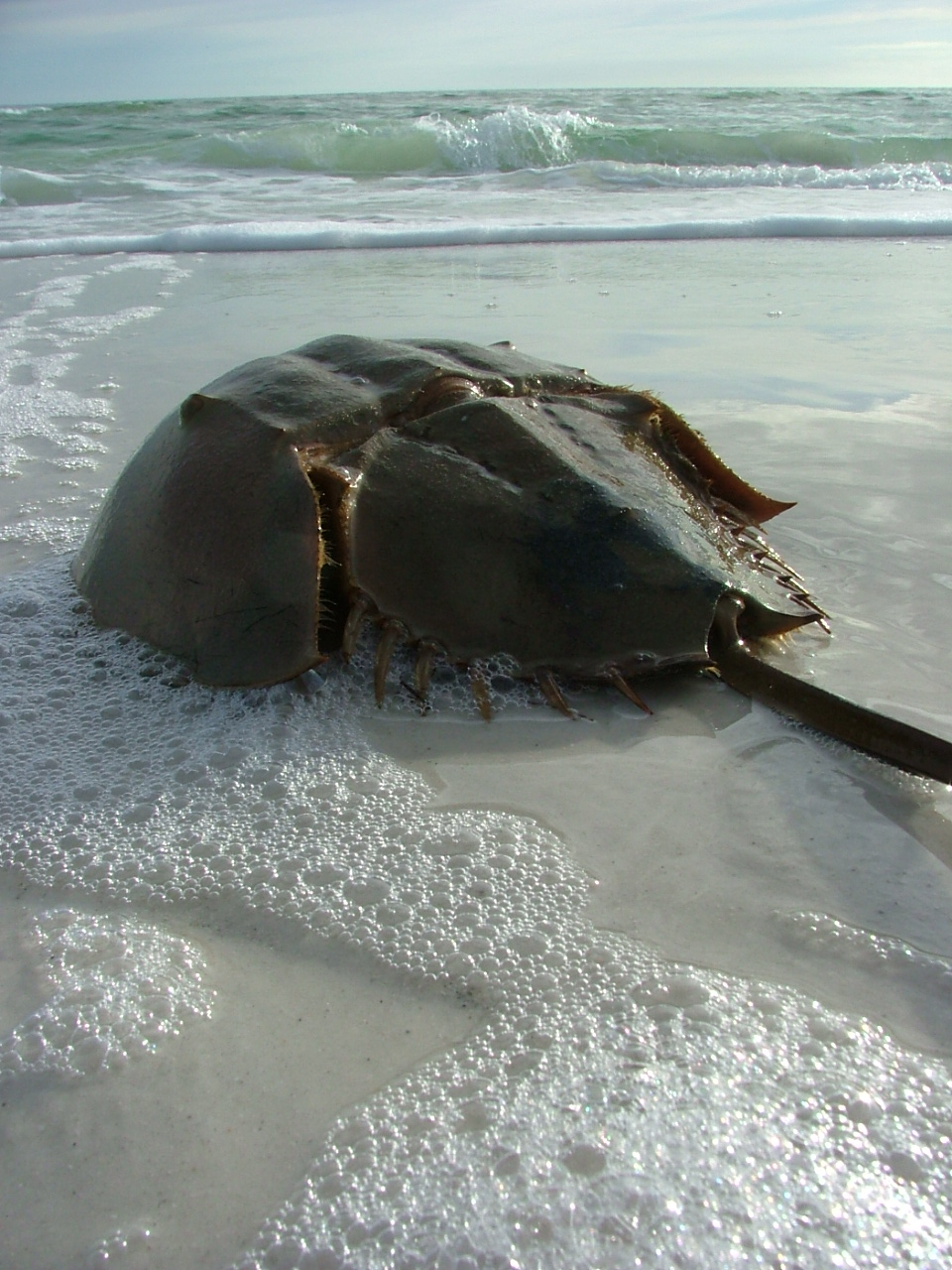
With little change over the last 450 million years, horseshoe crabs appear as living fossils.

- Jawless fish
  - Hagfish (Myxinidae) family
  - Lamprey (Petromyzontiformes)
- Bony fish
  - Arowana and arapaima (Osteoglossidae)
  - Bowfin (Amia calva)
  - Coelacanth (the lobed-finned Latimeria menadoensis and Latimeria chalumnae)
  - Gar (Lepisosteidae)
  - Queensland lungfish (Neoceratodus fosteri)
  - African lungfish (Protopterus sp.)
  - Sturgeons and paddlefish (Acipenseriformes)
  - Bichir (family Polypteridae)
  - Protanguilla palau
  - Mudskipper (Oxudercinae)
- Sharks
  - Blind shark (Brachaelurus waddi)
  - Bullhead shark (Heterodontus sp.)
  - Cow shark (sixgill sharks and relatives) (Hexanchidae)
  - Elephant shark (Callorhinchus milii)
  - Frilled shark (Chlamydoselachus sp.)
  - Goblin shark (Mitsukurina owstoni)
  - Gulper shark (Centrophorus sp.)

Invertebrates

- Insects
  - Mantophasmatodea (gladiators; a few living species)
  - Meropeidae (scorpionfly family; 3 living species, 4 extinct)
  - Nevrorthidae (3 species-poor family of lacewings)
  - Notiothauma reedi (a scorpionfly relative)
  - Peloridiidae (peloridiid bugs; fewer than 30 living species in 13 genera)
  - Tricholepidion gertschi (silverfish with nearest relatives in Eocene)
  - Coleopterans:
    - Cyclaxyridae (2 living species, Cenomanian origin)
    - Micromalthus debilis (also called a telephone-pole beetle, member of Micromalthidae family)
    - Rhinorhipid beetles (1 living species, Triassic origin)
    - Sikhotealinia zhiltzovae (sole living jurodid beetle)
  - Hymenopterans:
    - Cyatta abscondita (most recent common relative of Atta and Acromyrmex ant genera)
    - Helorid wasps (1 living genus, 11 extinct genera)
    - Mymarommatid wasps (10 living species in genus Palaeomymar)
    - Nothomyrmecia (known as the 'dinosaur ant')
    - Orussidae (parasitic wood wasps; sawfly family consisting of around 70 living species in 16 genera)
    - Rotoitid wasps (2 living species, 14 extinct)
    - Syntexis libocedrii (member of Anaxyelidae sawfly family; cedar wood wasp)
- Crustaceans
  - Glypheidea (2 living species: Neoglyphea inopinata and Laurentaeglyphea neocaledonica)
  - Stomatopods (mantis shrimp)
  - Polychelida (deep sea blind lobster)
  - Triopsidae (also known as tadpole shrimp; notostracan crustaceans)
- Molluscs
  - Nautilina (e.g., Nautilus pompilius)
  - Neopilina – Monoplacophoran
  - Slit snail (e.g., Entemnotrochus rumphii)
  - Vampyroteuthis infernalis – the vampire squid
  - Pleurocerid snails
- Other invertebrates
  - Crinoids
  - Horseshoe crabs (only 4 living species of the class Xiphosura, family Limulidae)
  - Lingula anatina (an inarticulate brachiopod)
  - Liphistiidae (trapdoor spiders)
  - Onychophorans (velvet worms)
  - Rhabdopleura (a hemichordate)
  - Valdiviathyris quenstedti (a craniforman brachiopod)
  - Paleodictyon nodosum (unknown)

== See also ==
- Relict (biology)
- Breeding back
- Lazarus taxon

== Notes ==
Baiji is not officially classified as extinct, but instead critically endangered, possibly extinct and has the unofficial status of functional extinction.
