= Sikhotealinia =

- Location of the Sikhote-Alin mountains in Russia, where S. zhiltzovae was found.

Scientific classification
- Kingdom: Animalia
- Phylum: Arthropoda
- Clade: Pancrustacea
- Class: Insecta
- Order: Coleoptera
- Family: Jurodidae
- Genus: Sikhotealinia; Lafer, 1996
- Species: S. zhiltzovae

Binomial name
- Sikhotealinia zhiltzovae Lafer, 1996

Genus of beetles

Sikhotealinia is a genus of beetles with one known species, Sikhotealinia zhiltzovae. Only one individual has ever been found; an adult female from the Sikhote-Alin mountains in eastern Russia. It is black and brown in color and covered with fine hairs, and is the only known living beetle to have three ocelli. Together with the genus Jurodes it compromises the family Jurodidae, which is likely a member of the suborder Archostemata. Some taxonomists are skeptical of this classification, as Sikhotealinia has many features typical of other suborders.

== Taxonomy ==
S. zhiltzovae is only known from an adult female found dead by a river in the Sikhote-Alin mountains. No attempts to recover further specimens have been successful, and as such nothing is known about its ecology or life cycle. It was described by G. S. Lafer in 1996, erecting the novel family Sikhotealiniidae. Lafer placed the family with the suborder Archostemata, but was not willing to classify it further. Similarities between Sikhotealinia and the extinct Jurassic genus Jurodes were pointed out by A.G. Ponomarenko to Alexander Kirejtshuk, who then reassigned it to the family Jurodidae. Kirejtshuk also found an affinity with Archostemata likely largely based on similarities of the thorax, although Sikhotealinia has some features of other suborders of beetles, such as the six exposed abdominal segments typical of Adephaga and a wing vein structure typical of Polyphaga.

Morphological phylogenetic analyses have found Sikhotealinia to indeed be a part of Archostemata; studies by Beutel & Ge and Li et al. both recovered Crowsoniella and Micromalthidae to be its closest living relatives. Hörnschemeyer also found Sikhotealinia to be in Archostemata but did not recover a stable placement. Nevertheless, some taxonomists consider an affinity outside of Archostemata, particularly with Polyphaga, to be more plausible.

- Archostemata
  - Ommatidae
  - - - Notocupes †
      - Cupedidae
    - - Jurodidae
        - Jurodes †
        - Sikhotealinia
      - - Catiniidae †
        - Crownsoniellidae
        - Micromalthidae

Position of Sikhotealinia within Archostemata, adapted from Beutel & Ge and Li et al. A dagger (†) indicates an extinct taxon.

== Description ==
S. zhiltzovae has a 6.3 mm (0.248 in) long and 2.65 mm (0.104 in) wide body covered in fine setae. The elytra and legs are light brown in color, while the back of the head and prothorax are dark brown to black. The head is slightly oblong; the compound eyes are round and protrude out of the head slightly. Unlike all other beetles, S. zhiltzovae and Jurodes have three ocelli, a feature that is likely an atavism. The antennae are connected to two flat-topped structures on the head and are divided into eleven segments, also being heavily covered with setae. The mandibles are strong and smooth, coming to a sharp point at their ends. The prothorax is of similar width to the head, being separated from each other by a distinct neck region. The mesoventrite, a raised structure between the middle pair of legs, is large and trapezoid-shaped. The elytra are the widest part of the body and are covered in dense rows of small depressions, with the venation of the wings being similar to those of polyphagans. The abdomen is laterally rounded and composed of six visible segments.
