= Catiniidae =

Catiniidae may refer to:

- Catiniidae (crustacean), a copepod family
- Catiniidae (beetle), an extinct beetle family
