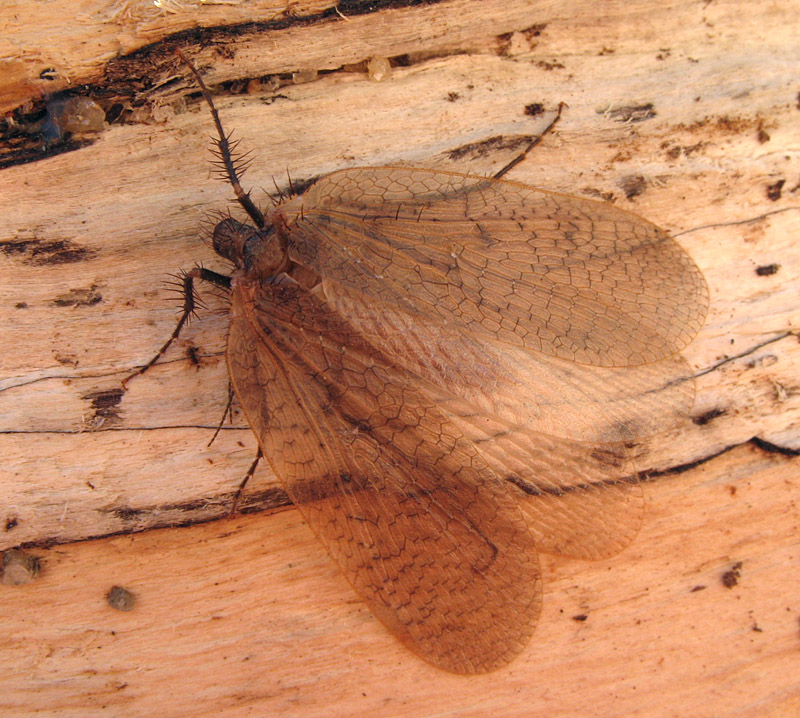
- Notiothauma reedi

Scientific classification
- Kingdom: Animalia
- Phylum: Arthropoda
- Clade: Pancrustacea
- Class: Insecta
- Order: Mecoptera
- Family: Eomeropidae; Cockerell 1909

Genera
- †Burmothauma; †Eomerope; †Jurathauma; †Tsuchingothauma; †Thaumamerope; †Typhothauma; Notiothauma

= Eomeropidae =

Eomeropidae Temporal range: Sinemurian–Recent

Family of insects

Eomeropidae is a family of flattened scorpionflies represented today by only a single living species, Notiothauma reedi, known from the Nothofagus forests in southern Chile, while all other recognized genera in the family are known only as fossils, with the earliest definitive fossil known from Liassic-aged strata, and the youngest from Paleogene-aged strata.

== Ecology ==
Notiothauma adults are thought to be saprophagous with a preference for carrion, having been observed feeding on dead chickens and rabbits, though in one experimental study they were also observed feeding on plant material.

== Genera ==
There are six extinct genera and one monotypic living genus which have been placed in Eomeropidae.

- †Eomerope. Cockerell 1909 This genus is known from Paleogene fossils from Eocene and Oligocene strata of North America, including the Allenby Formation and the Florissant Formation, and Paleocene to Oligocene strata of Russia. Because N. reedi is not known in the fossil record, Eomerope is the youngest of the fossil genera, and has the widest range.
- †Burmothauma Zhang at al. 2022 B. eureka is known from the mid Cretaceous Burmese amber of Myanmar.
- †Jurachorista. Soszyńska-Maj, et al., 2016 Known from the Early Jurassic, Sinemurian aged Charmouth Mudstone Formation of Dorset, England, is currently considered to be one of the oldest members of the family.
- †Jurathauma. Zhang et al. 2011 J. xinjiangensis is known from the Early Jurassic (Sinemurian) Badaowan Formation of Xinjiang, China, while J. simplex is known from the Middle Jurassic Daohugou Beds of Inner Mongolia, China.
- Notiothauma. McLachlan, 1877 N. reedi is a remarkable species, flattened and extremely cockroach-like in appearance and habits. It is nocturnal, and scuttles on the forest floor, where it can be collected by laying trails of oatmeal. The larvae are still unknown. Because this is the last extant species of Eomeropidae, N. reedi can be characterized as a living fossil taxon.
- †Tsuchingothauma. Ren and Shih 2005 T. shihi and T. gongi are both known from the Middle Jurassic Daohugou beds of China.
- †Typhothauma Ren and Shih 2005 known from the Early Cretaceous Dabeigou Formation and Yixian Formation of China, and possibly also the Weald Clay of England.

== Phylogeny ==
The proposed phylogenetic relationships within Eomeropidae based on Soszyńska-Maj et al 2016.

- - Eomeropidae
    - - Jurachorista
      - Jurathauma
    - - - Eomerope
      - - Tsuschingothauma
        - - Notiothauma
          - Typhothauma

Eomeropids have been suggested to be most closely related to the also poorly diverse and relictual Meropeidae.
