= Sikhote-Alin =

Mountain range in southeastern Russia

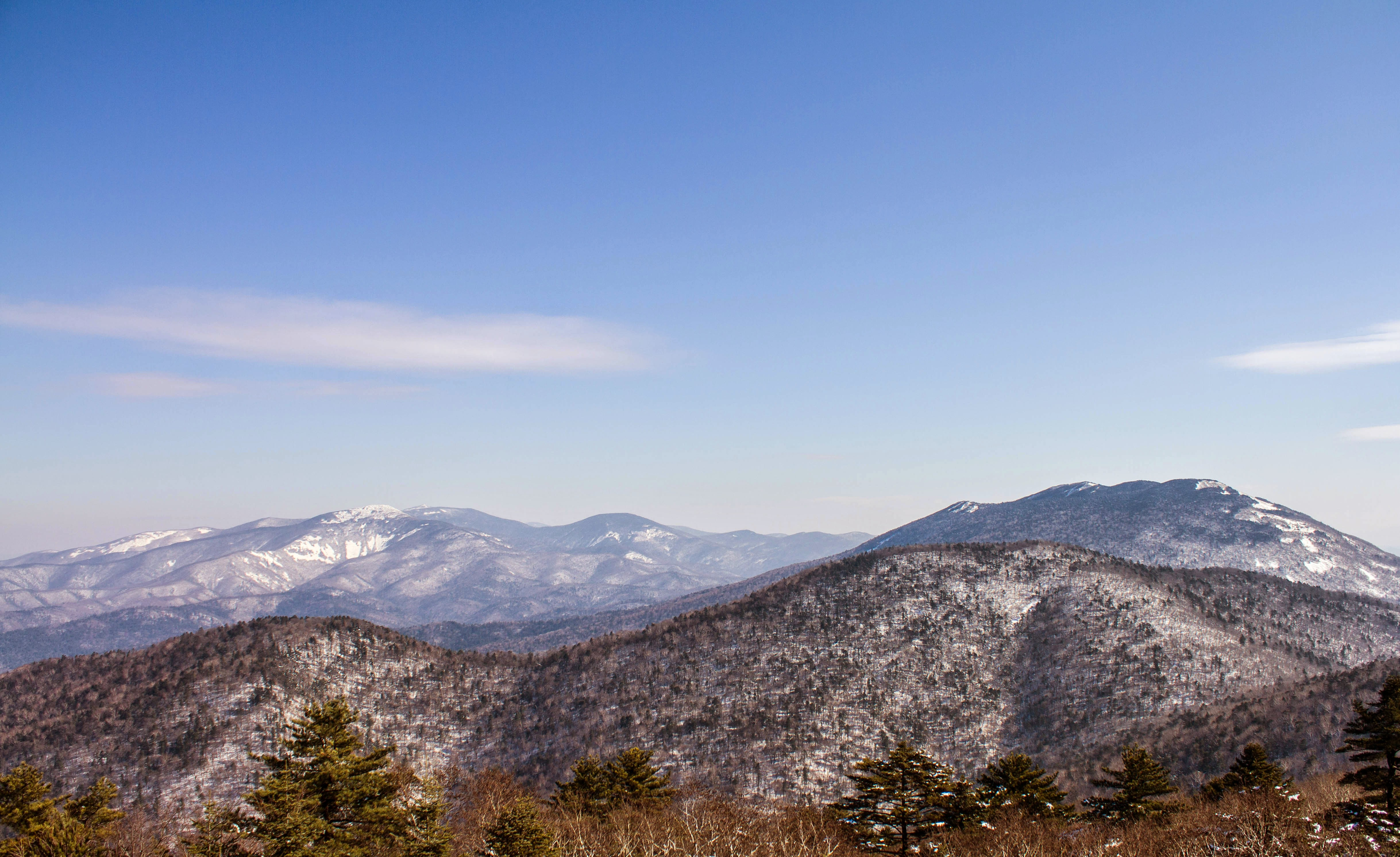
- Sikhote-Alin is the home to the Amur tiger, which is amongst the largest felines in the world

Highest point
- Peak: Tordoki Yani, Russia
- Elevation: 2,090 m (6,860 ft)
- Coordinates: 45°20′N 136°10′E

Dimensions
- Length: 900 km (560 mi)
- Width: 500 km (310 mi)

Naming
- Native name: Сихотэ́-Али́нь (Russian)

Geography
- Location within Russia

UNESCO World Heritage Site
- Official name: Central Sikhote-Alin
- Type: Natural
- Criteria: x
- Designated: 2001 (25th session)
- Reference no.: 766
- Region: Europe and Asia

The Sikhote-Alin (/ˈsiːkəˌteɪ əˈliːn/, SEE-kə-TAY ə-LEEN; Russian: Сихотэ́-Али́нь, Russian pronunciation: [sʲɪxɐˈtɛ ɐˈlʲinʲ]) is a mountain range in Primorsky and Khabarovsk Krais in Russia, extending about 900 kilometres (560 mi) to the northeast of the Russian seaport of Vladivostok on the Pacific Ocean. The highest summits are Tordoki Yani at 2,077 metres (6,814 ft) above sea level, Ko Mountain (2,003 metres (6,572 ft)) in Khabarovsk Krai and Anik Mountain (1,933 metres (6,342 ft)) in Primorsky Krai.

== Geography ==
Sikhote-Alin is a temperate zone, though species typical of northern taiga (such as reindeer and the Ussuri brown bear) coexist with the Amur tiger, Amur leopard, and Asiatic black bear. The region holds very few wolves, due to competition with tigers. The longest-lived tree in the region is a millennium-old Japanese yew. It is the only known habitat of Sikhotealinia, the only living member of the beetle family Jurodidae, which have been described as the “most mysterious representatives of beetles” due to their uncertain placement within the group.

Many tributaries of the Amur River lie within the range, including the Gur.

The core zone can only be explored in a company of rangers.

== History ==
The name might be Manchu for "coastal ridge", or Nanai for "foresty mountains".

In the 1910s and 1920s, Sikhote-Alin was extensively explored by Russian geographer and naturalist Vladimir Arsenyev (1872–1930), who described his adventures in several books, notably Dersu Uzala (1923), which in 1975 was turned into an Oscar-winning film by Akira Kurosawa. Largely due to his exploration and advocacy, the large Sikhote-Alin and Lazo wildlife refuges were set up in 1935 to preserve the region's unusual wildlife.

On 12 February 1947, one of the largest meteorite showers in recent history occurred in the mountains range. The Sikhote-Alin meteorite exploded in the atmosphere as it fell, raining many tons of metal on an elliptical region about 1.3 km^{2} (0.50 mi^{2}) in area. Craters were formed by the meteorites; the largest was 26 m (85 ft) in diameter.

In 2001, UNESCO placed "Central Sikhote-Alin" onto the World Heritage List, citing its importance for "the survival of endangered species such as the scaly-sided (Chinese) merganser, Blakiston's fish-owl and the Amur tiger". The World Heritage Site had a total area of 16,319 km^{2} (4,033,000 acres), of which the terrestrial core zone of Sikhote-Alin Zapovednik comprised 3,985 km^{2} (985,000 acres). In 2018, the World Heritage Site was expanded by 11,605 km^{2} (2,868,000 acres) by including Bikin National Park under the name "Bikin River Valley".

== Notable summits ==
=== Tordoki Yani ===
Tordoki Yani

Highest point
- Elevation: 2,090 m (6,860 ft)
- Prominence: 1,989 m (6,526 ft)
- Listing: Ultra, Ribu

Geography
- Location: Khabarovsk Krai, Russia

Tordoki Yani or Tardoki Yani (Russian: Тордоки-Яни) is the highest peak of the Sikhote-Alin Mountains. It is located in the southeast of Khabarovsk Krai to the north of the border of Primorsky Krai. It is a table mountain and rises to an elevation of 2,090 m (2077 at GSE). The mountain is the source of the river Anyuy.

=== Ko Mountain ===
Ko Mountain

Highest point
- Elevation: 2,004 m (6,575 ft)
- Prominence: 1,196 m (3,924 ft)
- Listing: Ribu

Geography
- Location: Khabarovsk Krai, Russia

Ko (Russian: Ко) is the second-highest point of the range. It is located in the southern part of Khabarovsk Krai near the border of Primorsky Krai, Russia.

It is 2,004 metres (6,575 ft) above sea level. The mountain's name is from the Udege language, meaning 'witch'.

=== Anik Mountain ===
Anik Mountain

Highest point
- Elevation: 1,933 m (6,342 ft)

Geography
- Location: Primorsky Krai, Russia

Anik Mountain (Russian: гора Аник) is the third highest peak in the range as well as the highest peak of Primorsky Krai, Russia. It is located in the north of Primorsky Krai on the border with Khabarovsk Krai.

== Gallery ==
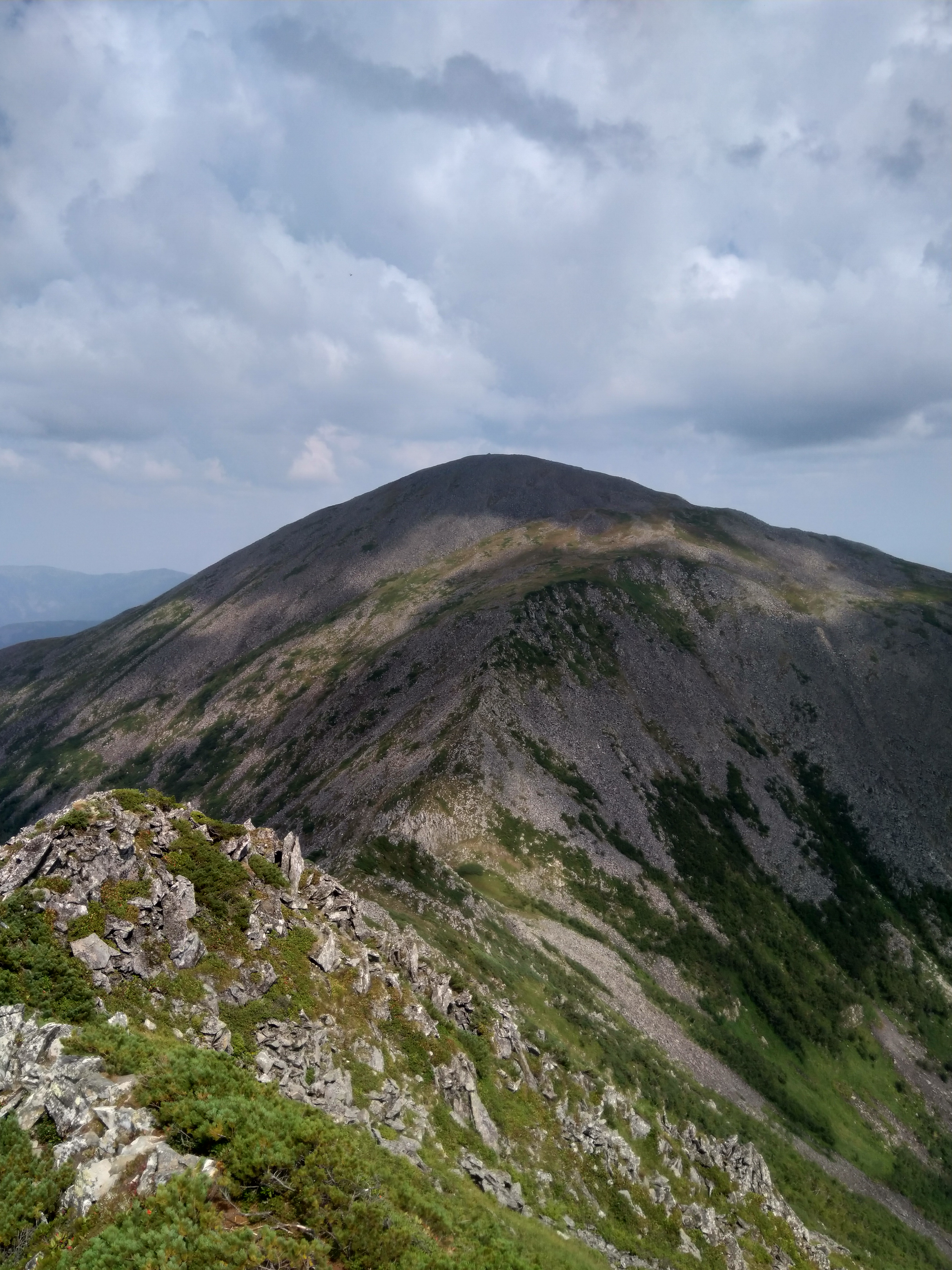
Ko Mountain

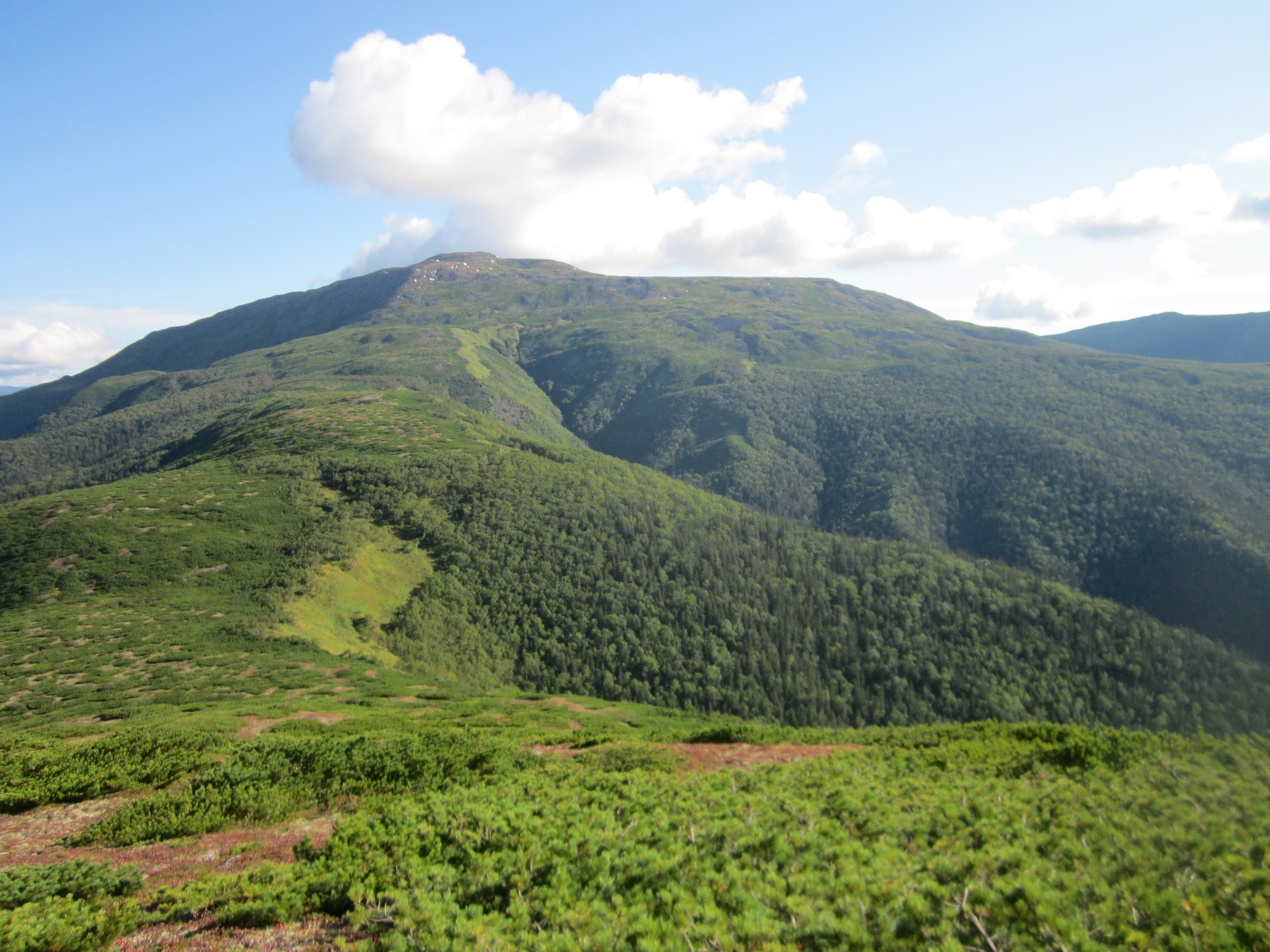
Anik Mountain
