= Roberto Pace =

- Born: 7 May 1935; Monteforte d'Alpone, Italy
- Died: 13 February 2017; San Bonifacio, Italy
- Known for: Research and illustration of beetles, especially Staphylinidae
- Scientific career
- Fields: Entomology
- Institutions: Museo Civico di Storia Naturale di Verona

Roberto Pace (7 May 1935 – 13 February 2017) was an Italian entomologist and scientific illustrator specializing in beetles.

== Biography ==
Roberto Pace was born in Monteforte d’Alpone to Attilio Pace and his wife Edvige, née Poli. In 1953, he graduated from the Liceo Statale Guarino Veronese in Verona, after which he worked as an elementary school teacher in Roncà. In 1968, he became a researcher at the Museo Civico di Storia Naturale di Verona, where, with the support of Sandro Ruffo, Giuseppe Osella, and Adriano Zanetti, he worked on the family Staphylinidae (rove beetles).

His main research interest was the subfamilies Leptotyphlinae and Aleocharinae. He focused not only on Italian species but also on those from New Caledonia, Madagascar, Africa, and Chile. By 2015, Pace had described around 6,400 species and 400 genera or subgenera, and had published more than 370 scientific papers in journals such as Memorie del Museo Civico di Storia Naturale di Verona, Bollettino della Società Entomologica Italiana, Fragmenta Entomologica, Redia, and Nouvelle Revue d’Entomologie.

He authored several monographs, including Monografia del genere Leptusa Kraatz (Coleoptera Staphylinidae) (1989), Coleoptera. Staphylinidae. Leptotyphlinae (1996), Insectes Coléoptères Staphylinidae Aleocharinae. Faune de Madagascar, 89 (1999), and Aleocharinae del Madagascar. Insectes Coléoptères Staphylinidae Aleocharinae (2005). One of the most distinctive aspects of his work was his detailed and precise illustrations of beetles. In 1973, he discovered the beetle species Crowsoniella relicta in the Monti Lepini, a living fossil whose relatives date back to the Tertiary period.

== Eponyms ==
Several species have been named in his honor, including:

- Allotyphlus pacei (Henri Coiffait, 1973)
- Otiorhynchus (Lixorrhynchus) pacei (Giuseppe Osella, 1976)
- Boreaphilus pacei (Adriano Zanetti, 1983)
- Cantaberella pacei (Marc Tronquet, 1998)
- Cordalia pacei (Volker Assing, 2001)
- Tropimenelytron pacei (Aleš Smetana, 2004)
