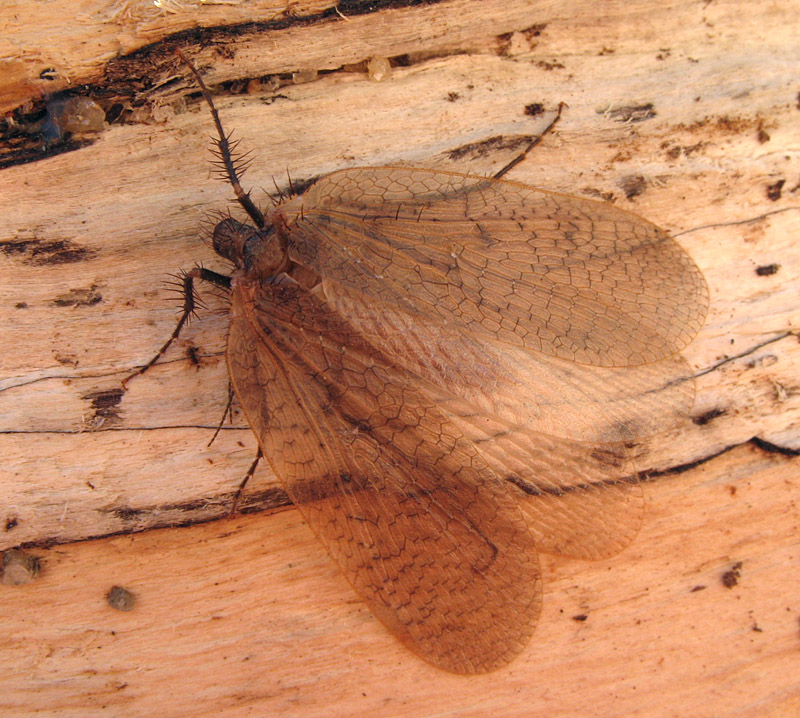
- Oncol Park, Chile

Scientific classification
- Kingdom: Animalia
- Phylum: Arthropoda
- Class: Insecta
- Order: Mecoptera
- Family: Eomeropidae
- Genus: Notiothauma; MacLachlan, 1877
- Species: N. reedi

Binomial name
- Notiothauma reedi MacLachlan, 1877

= Notiothauma =

Genus of insects

Notiothauma is the sole living genus in the scorpionfly family Eomeropidae. The genus is monotypic with a lone species Notiothauma reedi which is native to the Valdivian temperate rain forests of central Chile, especially the forests with Nothofagus stands. N. reedi is flattened with a notedly cockroach-like appearance. They are nocturnal and inhabit the forest floor, where the adults feed on plants and decaying animals. Due to these feeding habits, it is considered an insect of importance for forensic entomology. The larvae are still unknown. Because this is the last extant species of Eomeropidae, N. reedi can be characterized as a living fossil taxon.

== Phylogeny ==
The proposed phylogenetic relationships of N. reedi based on Soszyńska-Maj et al 2016.

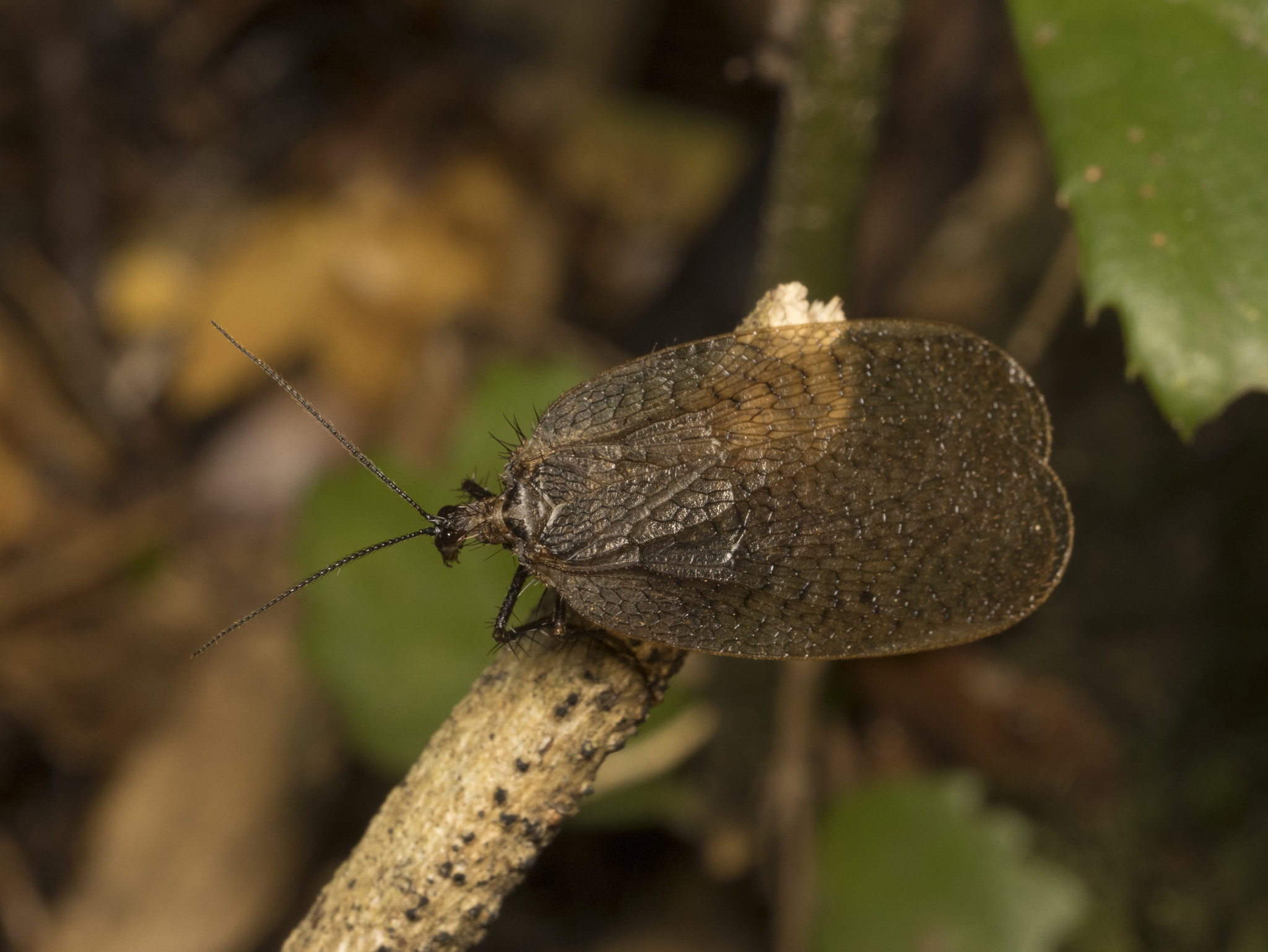
In Chile

- - Eomeropidae
    - - Jurachorista
      - Jurathauma
    - - - Eomerope
      - - Tsuschingothauma
        - - Notiothauma
          - Typhothauma
