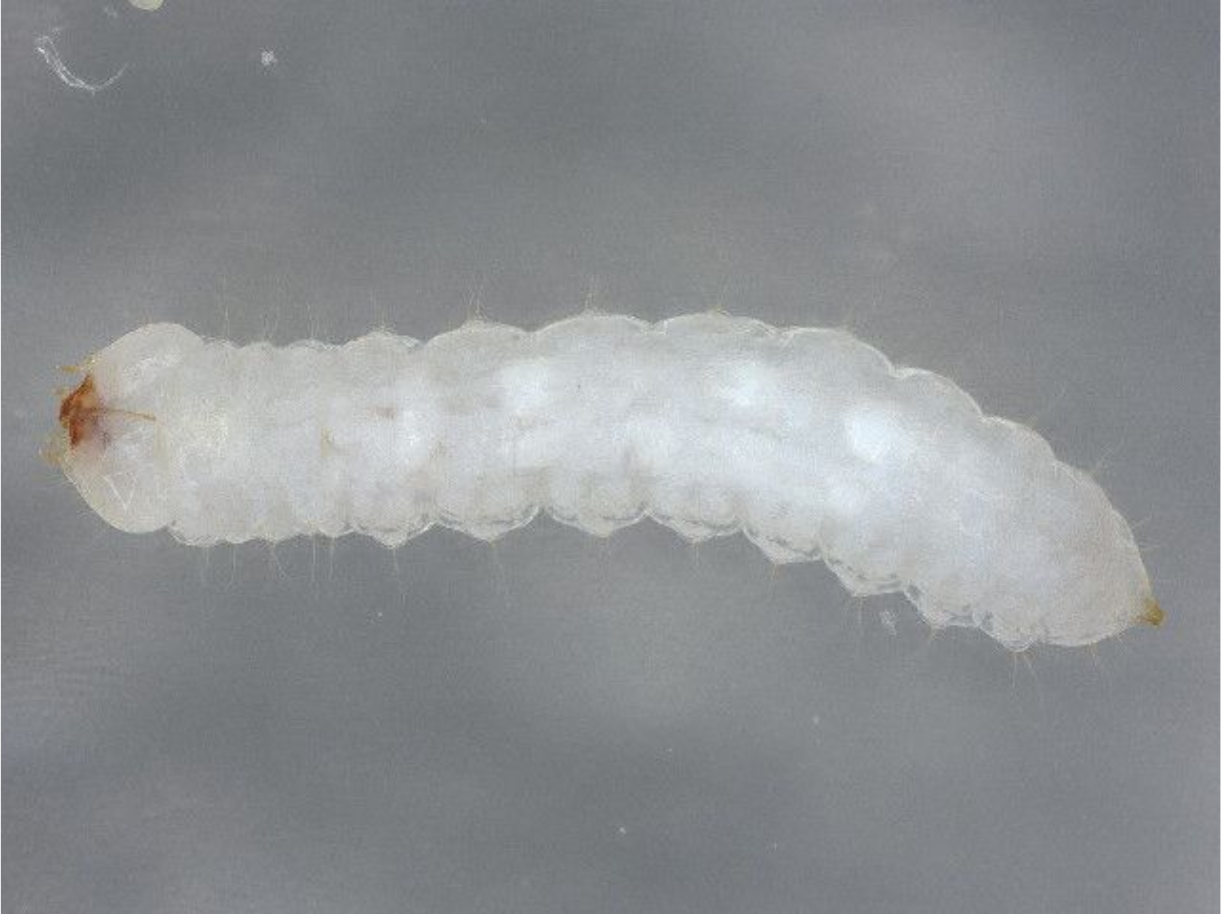
- Larval stage

Scientific classification
- Kingdom: Animalia
- Phylum: Arthropoda
- Clade: Pancrustacea
- Class: Insecta
- Order: Coleoptera
- Family: Micromalthidae
- Genus: Micromalthus; LeConte, 1878
- Species: M. debilis

Binomial name
- Micromalthus debilis LeConte, 1878

Other species
- †Micromalthus eocenicus Kirejtshuk, Nel & Collomb, 2010; †Micromalthus priabonicus Perkovsky, 2016

Synonyms
- Micromalthus anansi Perkovsky, 2008

= Telephone-pole beetle =

Telephone-pole beetle Temporal range: Miocene–Present
- The imago "ghost adult" stage

Species of beetle

The telephone-pole beetle (Micromalthus debilis) is a beetle native to the eastern United States and the only known living representative of the otherwise extinct family Micromalthidae. Larvae of the beetle live in decaying wood and can be pests to wooden structures, lending them their common name, the 'telephone-pole beetle.'

The larvae of Micromalthus debilis start as tiny white creatures with well-developed legs, resembling carabid larvae. Larvae bore into moist, decaying chestnut and oak logs, creating galleries as they consume wood fibers. Imagos are dark brown to blackish with vestigial reproductive organs. Micromalthus's evolutionary history dates back millions of years, with fossil records found in various ambers. Their larvae infest timber, weakening structures and attracting fungi, as seen in South African gold mines in the 1930s.

The telephone-pole beetle used to have reproducing imagos, but has evolved to become obligately paedogenetic, having asexually reproducing (parthenogenetic) female larvae and sterile imagos ("adult" form) that occasionally develop from the juveniles. The rare imago is sometimes referred to as a 'ghost adult' due to its vestigial existence. When a substantial number of imagos are generated at once in laboratory experiments, they exhibit vestigial mating behavior, including sex-role reversal, with females exhibiting more aggression and competition for mates. Being one of few parthenogenetic haplodiploid species, the telephone-pole beetle is an interesting subject of coleopteran reproductive behavior and physiology.

== Distribution ==
The species was historically endemic to eastern North America. Reports of the species are infrequent and it is unknown whether they are rare, or common and unrecognized. A recent survey found that the species had spread to every continent except Australia, with finds in South Africa, Hong Kong, Belize, Cuba, Brazil, Japan, Hawaii, Italy and Austria, the dispersal is likely connected to the timber trade.

== Taxonomy ==
Classification of M. debilis was historically controversial and unsettled. The species, first reported by John Lawrence LeConte in 1878, was long considered one of the Polyphaga, and placed in the Lymexylidae or Telegeusidae, or as a family within the Cantharoidea. However, characteristics of larvae, wings, and male genitalia show that it is in the suborder Archostemata, where it has been placed since 1999.

== Description ==
=== Larvae ===
Female-producing (thelytokous) female larvae

The thelytokous female larva resembles a carabid larva when first hatched. The first instar larva is the smallest in length, measuring about 1.26mm. The body is white, distinct lateral bulges are present, and the legs are well-developed. The second instar and subsequent instars have similar morphologies, with the head and body size and width increasing with each subsequent instar. The larvae measure between 2.7 and 3.3 millimeters in length. The head displays a light brown hue and notable sclerotization. In almost all segments, the cuticle covering the thorax and abdomen lacks pigmentation. The body is characterized by its slender, elongated form, maintaining parallel sides and cylindrical shape, featuring dorsal and ventral ampullae along with lateral bulges on numerous segments. The thorax is shorter than the combined length of abdominal segments I to III. In later instars, the body is slightly flatter, broader, and shorter. Legs are not present in second and older instars which is considered a trait unique to M. debilis.

Male-producing (arrhenotokous) female larvae

The penultimate instar of the male-producing larva is vaguely described as having a dense white color due to much fat. The body is cylindrically shaped and marked by segmented constrictions.

Male larvae

Unlike female larvae, which resemble the carabid type when first hatched, male larvae resemble that of a weevil. The body is short and stubby with stump-like legs.

=== Adults ===
Specimen in top-down view

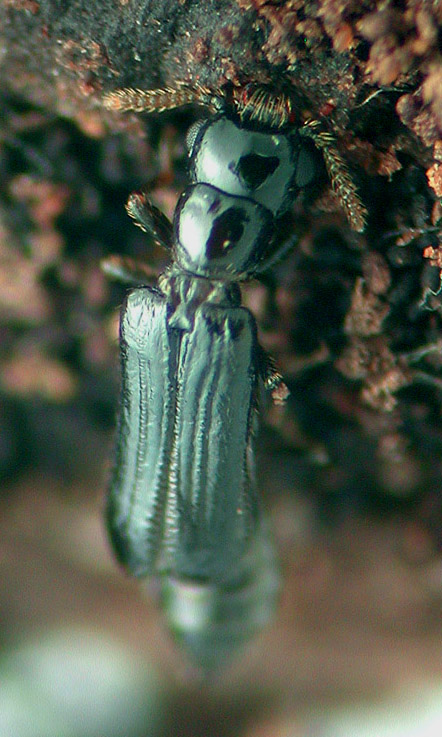
Living individual with front of body in focus

The "adult" beetle or imago is elongated and a dark brown to blackish color, with brownish-yellow legs and antennae. The head is larger than the thorax, with large eyes protruding from either side.

== Feeding ==
The larvae are wood-borers that feed on moist and decaying chestnut and oak logs. Telephone-pole beetle larvae infest timber by burrowing into the wood, where they feed and develop. They tunnel through the timber, creating galleries as they consume the wood fibers.

== Life cycle ==
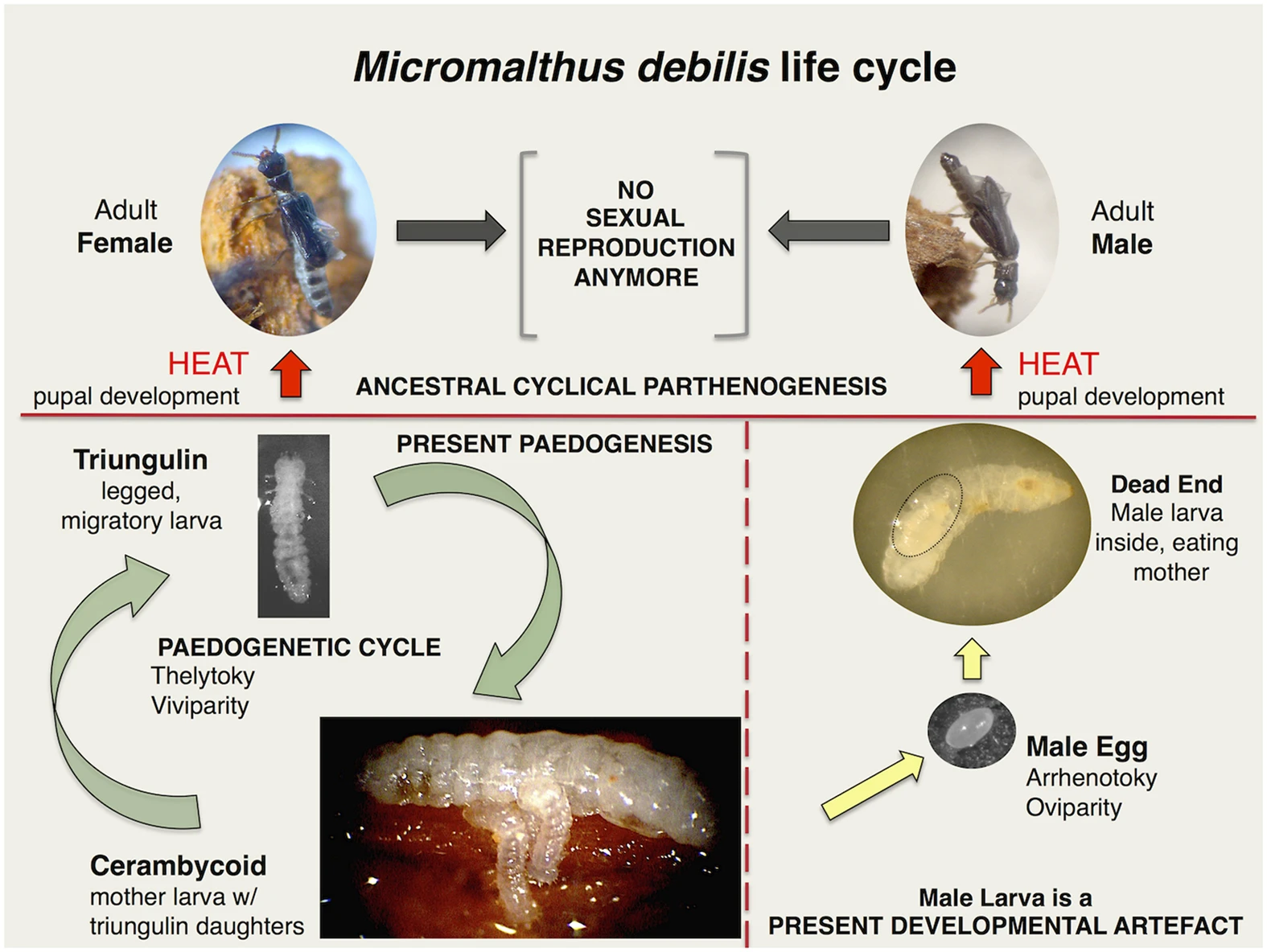
Diagram of life cycle

The life cycle of M. debilis is one of the most complicated life cycles among beetles because it involves viviparity, hypermetamorphosis, parthenogenesis, and paedogenesis. The life cycle is also highly unusual because the larvae rarely mature into imagos in both sexes. Haplodiploidy is another notable feature of this species, shared with only a few other species of Coleoptera; haploid males are hatched from eggs within the mother's body via haploid parthenogenesis, and diploid females are birthed live via diploid parthenogenesis.

=== Females ===
Upon being birthed live, the larva emerges as a minute white creature with long, slender legs that resemble the carabid type. This stage is primarily focused on migration, with the young larvae crawling away from the location of their birth to find new areas within their habitat. During this phase, they may consume the remains of their mother before migration. After a period of wandering, the larvae begin to burrow into wood or other suitable substrates again. They feed minimally during this time and undergo their first molt, transforming into a legless form that resembles the larva of cerambycid beetles. This stage is characterized by the development of an inconspicuous anal armature. Additional molts occur in this form, likely to accommodate head growth and overall body development. The larvae continue to bore through wood, packing their galleries with dust as they progress. The color of their bodies may darken due to the accumulation of food in their alimentary tract. As the larvae near maturity, the eggs in the ovaries of what will become the paedogenetic form become visible. At this stage, the larvae reverse their position in the gallery, construct a cell, and enter an aestivation phase. During aestivation, their bodies gradually turn white as they consume all available food in their system.

Depending on circumstances, the larvae may either pupate (though this is described as rare) or undergo another molt, ultimately revealing the paedogenetic form, in which they can produce young. Paedogenesis is the process by which larvae reproduce by giving birth to more larvae without the production of the typical adult stage and is a process exclusive to females. Once the paedogenetic form emerges, it typically takes around two weeks for the new generation to be born. The young larvae are born tail-first and begin the cycle anew, continuing the species' life cycle.

=== Males ===
Male larvae are hatched from a single, large egg that adheres to the male-producing larva's body for 8–10 days. The larvae feed on the mother's body and will grow rapidly. The male rarely pupates and transforms into the imago, and will often die as a larva. While male imagos only develop from uni-oviparous paedogenetic females, female imagos only develop from cerambycoid paedogenetic females.

=== Larval sex ratio ===
In naturally occurring paedogenetic larvae, the sex ratio is strongly biased toward females. None of the three canonical explanations for biased sex ratios, local mate competition, local resource competition, and local resource enhancement, are likely explanations for the biased sex ratio in telephone-pole beetle larvae. Local mate competition selects for female-biased sex ratios when male siblings compete to fertilize their female siblings, but this is unlikely in this species, in which females tend to avoid mating with siblings. Local resource competition selects for biased sex ratios but typically involves competition between females for resources and thus selects for male-biased ratios. Lastly, local resource enhancement can select for biased sex ratios if the offspring of one sex increases the fitness of parents. However, because female offspring feed on the mother, there is more likely competition between female larvae, contradicting this explanation. As such, the cause of sex ratio deviation remains unclear.

=== Adulthood ===
Telephone-pole beetle imagos are unable to copulate, and female imagos do not have the physiological mechanisms to reproduce because they are unable to lay eggs or produce live progeny, either sexually or by parthenogenesis. Limited observations and experiments on M. debilis have resulted in conflicting observational conclusions, particularly regarding the beetle's reproduction, in the existing literature. Pollock & Normack reported the existence of reproductive male imagos, but this was based on the incorrect conclusions by Barber. However, all existing experimental literature states that imagos are sterile.

Since imagos of this species do not have a role in reproduction, they are not a physiological part of the life cycle. Thus, the rarity of development to the imago stage in nature may be an evolutionary response to the lack of their reproductive role. In laboratory settings, development into imagos can be induced by high temperatures, but this also results in high mortality because only one out of hundreds of heat-treated larvae will survive and pupate into an imago.

The female imagos live for about six days and males only live for around 12 hours, with a strongly biased sex ratio towards females. The imagos of both sexes are sterile and are vestigial remnants of a time when the life cycle involved sexual reproduction. The loss of sexual reproduction is likely associated with its infection by Wolbachia bacteria.

== Mating behavior ==
A 2016 experimental study used heating to generate substantial numbers of imagos to simulate the now non-functional adult reproductive behavior.

=== Sex role reversal ===
The study revealed sex-role reversal, meaning that females face more competition for mates compared to males. This was demonstrated by greater initiative by females to mate and increased fighting between females in the presence of unrelated males. Female also display more aggressive mating behavior, as they may grasp the male genitalia with their own genitalia.

=== Rejection behavior ===
Adult female beetles exhibit rejection behavior to avoid inbreeding with related males, which are adult male beetles that are located on the same natal log. Right after pupating, males expose their reproductive organs as a mate-seeking gesture. Despite tending to compete for male mates, females will ignore these males because they originate from the same log. The males would need to take a short flight to a neighboring log for female mates. Females also perform a 'kin dance' involving shaking of their abdomens and beating of their wing, which is thought to be a deterring signal to related males. Such rejection behaviors demonstrate that sex roles are not fixed because females can also display choosy behavior. The rejection behavior also supports that the female-biased sex ratio is not due to local mate competition.

=== Mounting ===
Females initiated more interactions by actively mounting males, further supporting that female compete for male mates. In cases where several females pile on top of a male, a female may try to dislodge the others with her mandible. Female-female mounting can also occur, and the frequency of this does not change depending on the presence or absence of males.

== Evolutionary history ==
Genetic studies have placed Micromalthus as more closely related to Ommatidae than to Cupedidae within Archostemata. A close relationship between Ommatidae and Micromalthidae is supported by several morphological characters, including those of the mandibles and male genitalia. A close relationship to the enigmatic family Crowsoniellidae has been suggested by some sources. The oldest record of Micromalthidae is Archaeomalthus from the Upper Permian of Russia around 252 million years old, which is morphologically similar in many respects to Micromalthus including an only weakly sclerotised body. Several other fossil genera of the family are known including Cretomalthus, known from a larva found in Early Cretaceous (Barremian) Lebanese amber, as well as Protomalthus from the mid-Cretaceous (Albian-Cenomanian) Burmese amber of Myanmar.

Fossils of Micromalthus are known from the Miocene aged Dominican amber (imagos and larvae, which were found to not be distinguishable from the living species) and Mexican amber (larvae), the late Eocene aged Rovno amber of Ukraine (Micromalthus priabonicus), and the early Eocene (Ypresian) aged Oise amber of France (Micromalthus eocenicus). A possible specimen of Micromalthus is known from Burmese amber, but the poor preservation of the specimen makes the assignment tentative.

== Wood pests ==
Telephone-pole beetle larvae infest timber by burrowing into the wood, where they feed and develop. They tunnel through the timber, creating galleries as they consume the wood fibers. This activity weakens the structural integrity of the timber, leading to decay and potential collapse. Additionally, their presence can attract fungi, further contributing to the degradation of the timber.

In the 1930s, telephone-pole beetle larvae were reported as the perpetrators of a gold mine infestation in the Witwatersrand Basin in South Africa. The primary timbers employed in the mines, including Acacia, Eucalyptus, and Pinus species, are all susceptible to infestation, particularly in conditions with ample moisture. Heavy infestations were noted in aged timbers within poorly ventilated shafts, especially in environments with temperatures ranging from 88 to 93 °F. The presence of stagnant or running water may cause even further decay, sometimes resulting in complete pulverization.
