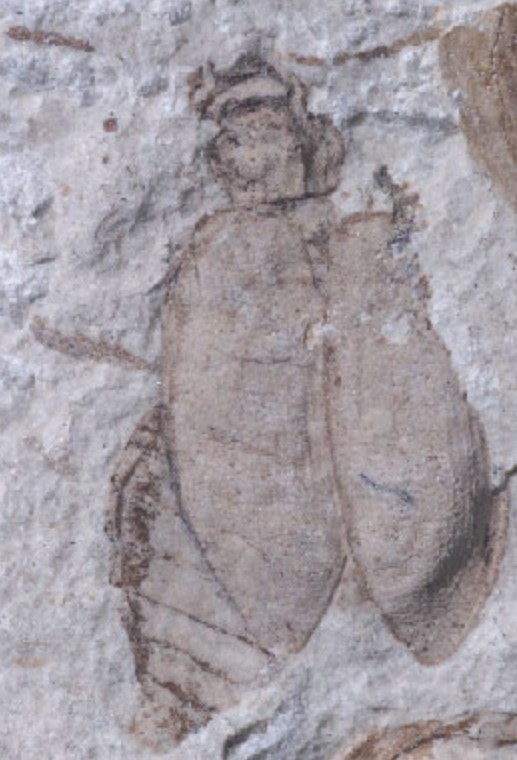
- Fossil of J.daohugouensis, paratype

Scientific classification
- Kingdom: Animalia
- Phylum: Arthropoda
- Clade: Pancrustacea
- Class: Insecta
- Order: Coleoptera
- Suborder: Archostemata
- Family: Jurodidae
- Genus: †Jurodes; Ponomarenko, 1985

= Jurodes =

Jurodes Temporal range: Callovian–Tithonian

Extinct genus of beetles

Jurodes is an extinct genus of archostematan beetles from the Jurassic period of Asia. Five species have been described. Along with the extant Sikhotealinia, it is one of the two known genera belonging to the family Jurodidae.

== Species ==
- †Jurodes ignoramus Ponomarenko, 1985 Ichetuy Formation, Buryatia, Russia, Late Jurassic (Oxfordian)
- †Jurodes minor Ponomarenko, 1990 Glushkovo Formation, Zabaykalsky, Russia, Late Jurassic (Tithonian)
- †Jurodes daohugouensis Yan, Wang, Ponomarenko & Zhang, 2014 Dahougou, China, Middle Jurassic (Callovian)
- †Jurodes pygmaeus Yan, Wang, Ponomarenko & Zhang, 2014 Dahougou, China, Callovian
- †Jurodes shartegiensis Yan, 2014 Shar Teeg, Mongolia, Tithonian
