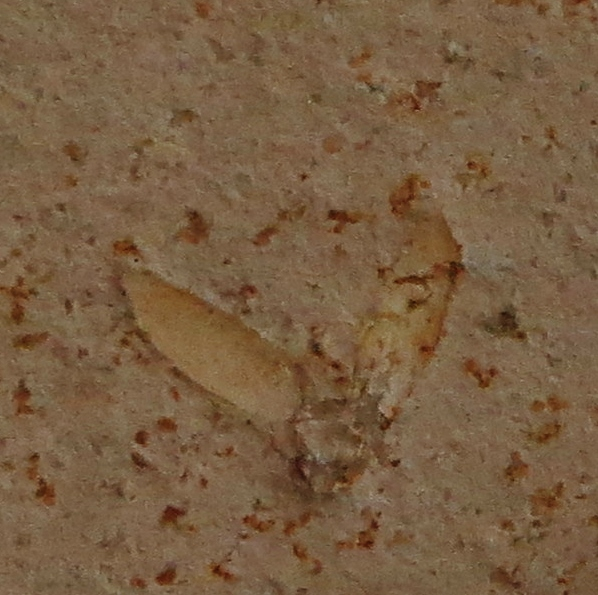
- Malmelater teyleri

Scientific classification
- Domain: Eukaryota
- Kingdom: Animalia
- Phylum: Arthropoda
- Class: Insecta
- Order: Coleoptera
- Suborder: Archostemata
- Superfamily: †Schizocoleoidea; Rohdendorf, 1961

Synonyms
- Schizophoroidea Ponomarenko, 1968

= Schizocoleoidea =

Superfamily of beetles

Schizocoleoidea is a superfamily within the order Coleoptera and falls under the suborder Archostemata. It was discovered by B.B. Rohdendorf in 1961. The superfamily includes other different families, called the Schizocoleidae and Phoroschizidae, which lived from the Permian to the Jurassic period, around 250 to 150 million years ago. Fossil records for Schizocoleoidea have been found in various parts of the world, including Australia, Northern parts of Eurasia and parts of England. The superfamily also includes genera such as Schizocoleus and Mesosagrites, which assisted scientists trace the morphological evolution and ecological niches of early beetles within ancient ecosystems.
