= Catiniidae (beetle) =

Catiniidae Temporal range: Early Triassic–Early Cretaceous

Scientific classification
- Domain: Eukaryota
- Kingdom: Animalia
- Phylum: Arthropoda
- Class: Insecta
- Order: Coleoptera
- Suborder: Archostemata
- Superfamily: †Schizocoleoidea
- Family: †Catiniidae; Ponomarenko, 1968

Synonyms
- Coleocatiniidae Ponomarenko and Prokin, 2015 (unavailable)

Extinct family of beetles

Catiniidae is a small extinct family of beetles known from the Early Triassic to the Early Cretaceous. The family is usually classified as a member of the suborder Archostemata, but beetles in this family had smooth elytra (hardened forewings) unlike members of the modern-day families Cupedidae and Ommatidae which have elytra with window punctures.

The family name Catiniidae Ponomarenko, 1968 is a junior homonym of Catiniidae Bocquet and Stock, 1957, used for a family of copepods. Ponomarenko and Prokin (2015) proposed "Coleocatiniidae" as a replacement name for the beetle family, but it is unavailable under the International Code of Zoological Nomenclature as it was not based on an available genus group name at the time. In Kirejtshuk and Prokin (2018), Catiniidae was treated as a synonym of Triaplidae Ponomarenko, 1977, but this synonymy was not supported by Ponomarenko (2021).

== Genera ==
These six genera belong to the family Catiniidae:

- †Avocatinus Ponomarenko, 1969 – Madygen Formation, Kyrgyzstan, Late Triassic
- †Catinius Ponomarenko, 1968 – Karabastau Formation, Kazakhstan, Late Jurassic; Dalazi Formation, China, Early Cretaceous
- †Catinoides Ponomarenko, 1969 – Madygen Formation, Kyrgyzstan, Late Triassic
- †Macrocatinius Ponomarenko, 1969 – Madygen Formation, Kyrgyzstan, Late Triassic
- †Permocatinus Ponomarenko, 2021 – Maltsevo Formation, Russia, Early Triassic
- †Triassocatinius Ponomarenko, 1969 – Madygen Formation, Kyrgyzstan, Late Triassic

The genera Cervicatinius and Forticatinius were originally placed in this family by Tan and Ren (2007), but were transferred to the superfamily Cleroidea in 2010.
