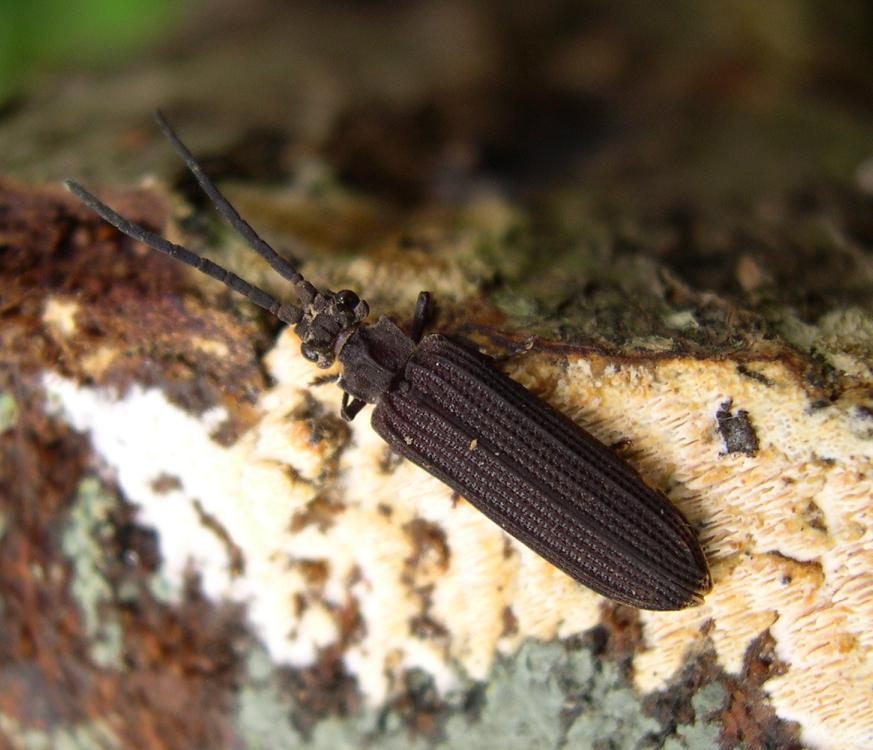
- Tenomerga mucida

Scientific classification
- Kingdom: Animalia
- Phylum: Arthropoda
- Clade: Pancrustacea
- Class: Insecta
- Order: Coleoptera
- Suborder: Archostemata; Kolbe, 1908

Families
- Crowsoniellidae; Cupedidae; Jurodidae; Micromalthidae; Ommatidae; Catiniidae †

= Archostemata =

Archostemata Temporal range: Late Permian–Recent

Suborder of beetles

The Archostemata are the smallest suborder of beetles, consisting of 50 living species in five families and over 200 described fossil species. They are an ancient lineage with a number of primitive characteristics. Antennae may be thread-shaped (filiform) or like a string of beads (moniliform). This suborder also contains the only beetles where both sexes are paedogenic, Micromalthus debilis. Modern archostematan beetles are considered rare, but were more diverse during the Mesozoic.

The term "Archostemata" is used more broadly by some authors to include both modern archostematans as well as stem-group beetles like "protocoleopterans", which some modern archostematans closely resemble due to their plesiomorphic morphology. Genetic research suggests that modern archostematans are a monophyletic group. Some genetic studies have recovered archostematans as the sister group of Myxophaga. Archostemata have an external prothoracic pleuron, a character also found in Myxophaga and Adephaga. The apex of the wing is spirally rolled as in Myxophaga. The adults have movable hind coxae.

A 2009 paper argued that the poor diversity of modern Archostemata, compared with the staggering evolutionary success of most other Coleoptera lineages, could be due to the lower efficiency of the thoracic locomotor apparatus, the absence of cryptonephric Malpighian tubules, and competition with other beetles more adapted to angiosperms.

== Taxonomy ==
There are five extant families and an extinct family.

- Family Crowsoniellidae Iablokoff-Khnzorian, 1983
- Family Cupedidae Laporte, 1838
- Family Jurodidae Ponomarenko, 1985
- Family Micromalthidae Barber, 1913
- Family Ommatidae Sharp and Muir, 1912
- Family Catiniidae † Ponomarenko, 1968

== Phylogeny ==
A partial phylogeny of Archostemata and early coleopterans, based on palaeontological data, from Boudinot et al. 2022.

- Coleoptera
  - Tshekardocoleidae †
  - Mesocoleoptera
    - Permocupedidae †
    - Metacoleoptera
      - - - **Archostemata**
            - Cupedidae
            - - Ommatidae
              - Micromalthidae
          - Myxophaga
        - Adephaga
      - Polyphaga

According to Li et al. 2023; archostematan families are in bold.

- Coleoptera
  - Tshekardocoleidae †
  - - Permocupedidae †
    - Rhombocoleidae †
    - - Triadocupedinae †
      - - - - Ademosynidae †
            - Schizophoridae †
          - - Trachypachus
            - - Helophorus
              - Torridincola
        - **Archostemata**
          - - **Ommatidae**
              - Omma
              - Tetraphalerus
          - - - - - **Jurodidae**
                    - Sikhotealinia
                    - Jurodes †
                  - - - **Crowsoniellidae**
                    - - **Micromalthidae**
                      - **Catiniidae**†
            - - Notocupes†
              - **Cupedidae**
                - Priacma
                - - Paracupes
                  - - Cupes
                    - Tenomerga
                    - Rhipsideigma
                    - - Ascioplaga
                      - Distocupes

== See also ==
- List of subgroups of the order Coleoptera
