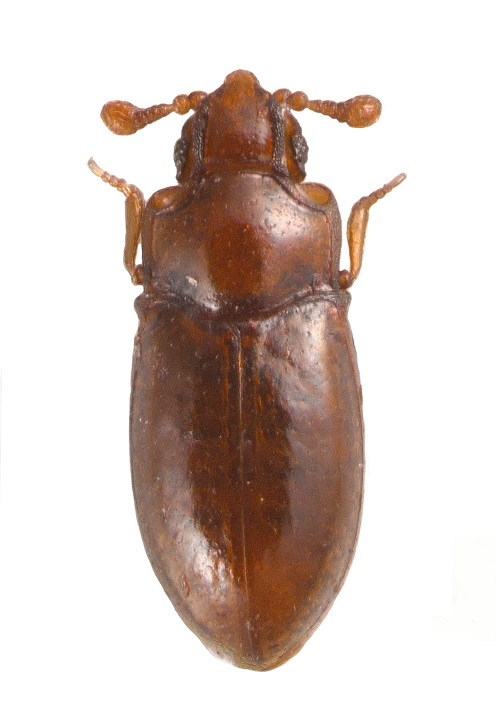
- One of the three known male specimens

Scientific classification
- Kingdom: Animalia
- Phylum: Arthropoda
- Clade: Pancrustacea
- Class: Insecta
- Order: Coleoptera
- Suborder: Archostemata
- Family: Crowsoniellidae; Iablokoff-Khnzorian, 1983
- Genus: Crowsoniella; Pace, 1976
- Species: C. relicta

Binomial name
- Crowsoniella relicta Pace, 1976

= Crowsoniella =

Family of beetles

Crowsoniella is a genus of beetles in the order Archostemata. It contains only a single species, Crowsoniella relicta, and is the only member of the monotypic family Crowsoniellidae. It is known only from three male specimens collected in 1973 in the Lepini mountains of central Italy by Roberto Pace. In a degraded pasture, the beetles were found by washing soil among the roots of a large chestnut tree (Castanea sativa), in deep calcareous soil. No other specimens have been found since despite searches at the type locality.

At only 1.5 mm (1/16 in) in length, this species is comparatively small for this suborder. They also feature several unusual morphological features such as missing alae, modified and reduced mouth parts, and smooth elytra (lacking window punctures characteristic of this suborder). Nothing is known about this species' biology. Some authors have proposed a close relationship to Micromalthidae. The genus is named after Roy Crowson.
