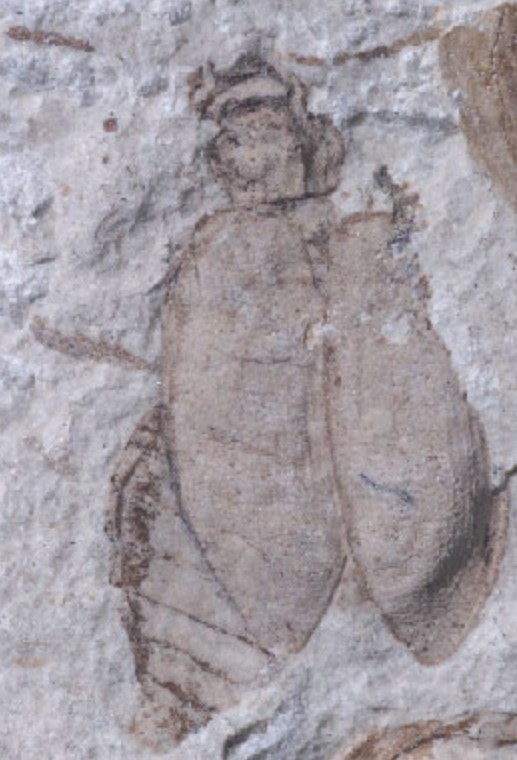
- Fossil of Jurodes

Scientific classification
- Kingdom: Animalia
- Phylum: Arthropoda
- Clade: Pancrustacea
- Class: Insecta
- Order: Coleoptera
- Suborder: Archostemata
- Family: Jurodidae; Ponomarenko, 1985

Genera
- †Jurodes; Sikhotealinia

Synonyms
- Sikhotealiniidae Lafer, 1996

= Jurodidae =

Jurodidae Temporal range: Middle Jurassic-Present

Family of beetles

Jurodidae is a family of beetles that was originally described for the extinct genus Jurodes, known from the Middle-Late Jurassic of Asia. In 1996, a living species, Sikhotealinia zhiltzovae, was discovered in the Sikhote-Alin mountains in southeastern Siberia, and assigned to this family. Their placement is uncertain, but are usually considered archostematans. In one study, Sikhotealinia and Jurodes were considered a sister group to all other archostematan beetles. However, other authors have considered their placement within beetles as a whole uncertain, due to their mix characteristics of typical Archostemata, as well as Polyphaga and Adephaga.

== Subdivision ==
- †Jurodes Ponomarenko 1985
  - †Jurodes ignoramus Ponomarenko, 1985 Ichetuy Formation, Buryatia, Russia, Late Jurassic (Oxfordian)
  - †Jurodes minor Ponomarenko, 1990 Glushkovo Formation, Zabaykalsky, Russia, Late Jurassic (Tithonian)
  - †Jurodes daohugouensis Yan, Wang, Ponomarenko & Zhang, 2014 Dahougou, China, Middle Jurassic (Callovian)
  - †Jurodes pygmaeus Yan, Wang, Ponomarenko & Zhang, 2014 Dahougou, China, Callovian
  - †Jurodes shartegiensis Yan, 2014 Shar Teeg, Mongolia, Tithonian
- Sikhotealinia Lafer, 1996
  - Sikhotealinia zhiltzovae Lafer, 1996
