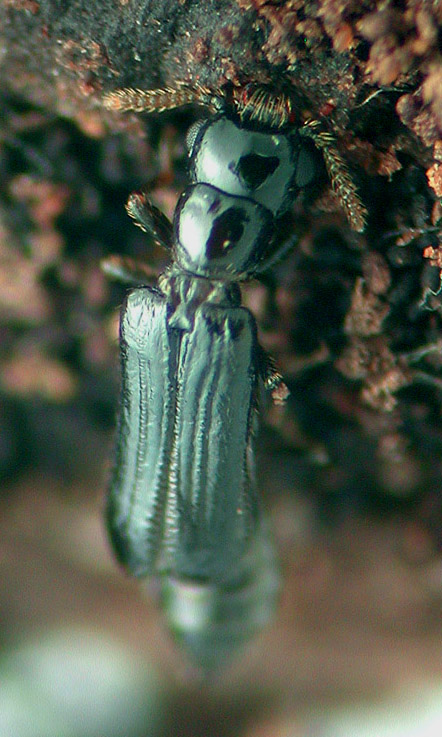
- "Ghost adult" stage of Micromalthus debilis
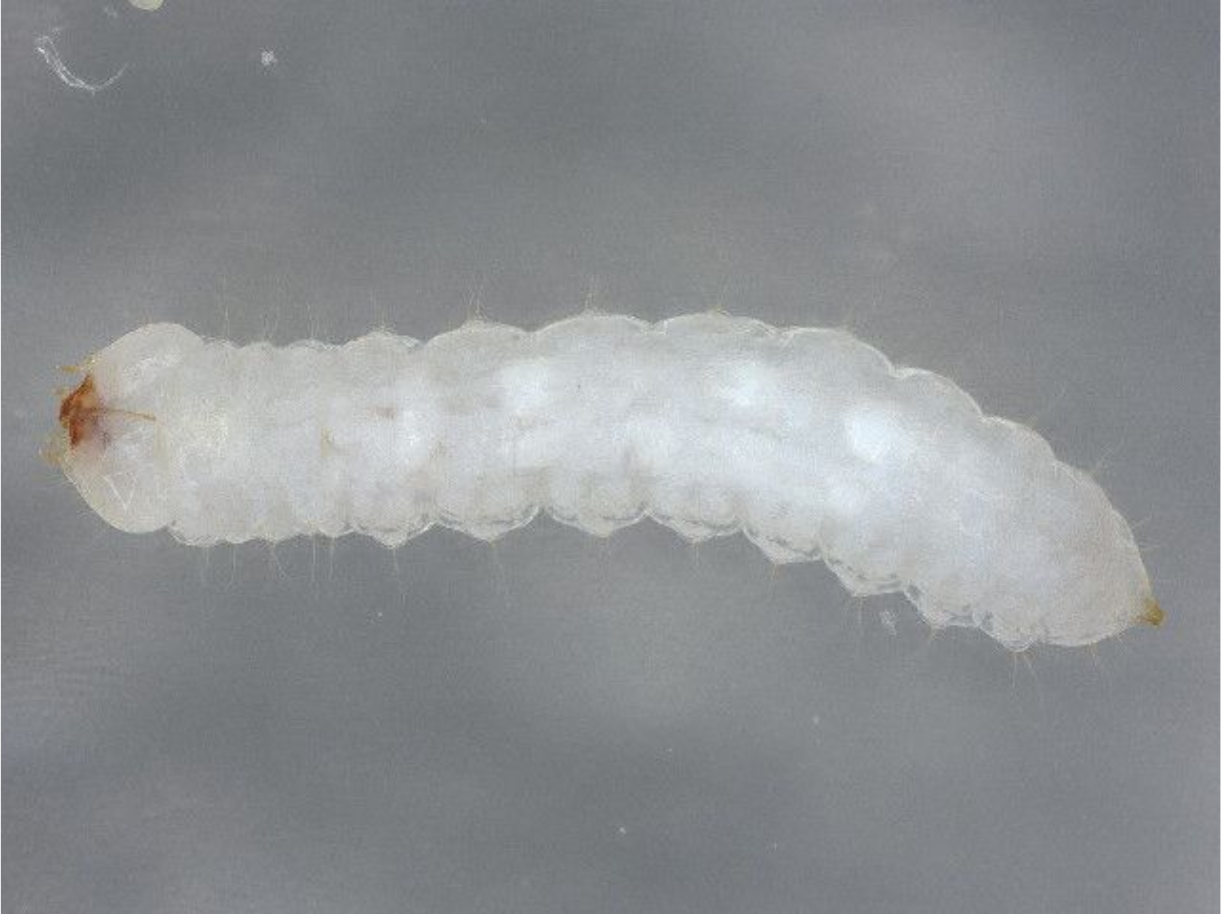
- Larval stage of Micromalthus debilis

Scientific classification
- Kingdom: Animalia
- Phylum: Arthropoda
- Clade: Pancrustacea
- Class: Insecta
- Order: Coleoptera
- Suborder: Archostemata
- Family: Micromalthidae; Barber, 1913

Genera
- †Archaeomalthus Yan et al., 2019; †Cretomalthus Kirejtshuk & Azar, 2008; Micromalthus LeConte, 1878; †Protomalthus Tihelka, Huang, Cai, 2020

= Micromalthidae =

Micromalthidae Temporal range: Late Permian–Present

Family of beetles

Micromalthidae is an ancient family of small beetles belonging to the suborder Archostemata. The only known living representative is the telephone-pole beetle, Micromalthus debilis. A few extinct species have been described, the oldest being the Late Permian Archaeomalthus synoriacos. It is one of the oldest families of beetles still existing today.

Micromalthus debilis is remarkable for its paedogenetic reproductive strategy which is almost unique in the animal kingdom, with the partial exception of Loricifera, and that could have already evolved in prehistoric Micromalthidae.

Micromalthidae is one of the first groups of beetles to evolve shortened elytra, along with Gyrinidae.
