= Argun Formation =

Geological formation in Russia and Ukraine

The Argun Formation is the name of geological formation, formed in Crimea and Chita, Russia. It formed in early Cretaceus, appeared around 125.45 - 122.46 Ma, and ended in Miocene, ~23.03 - 15.97 Ma. Its lithology is characterized as shale in Crimea and siliclastic in Pad Semen (near Chita).

== Fossil content ==
The formation contains mainly remains of fossil insects, mainly beetles:

- Archeraphidia baisensis
- Acmaeoderimorpha emersa
- Antemnacrassa geminata
- Brochocoleus minor
- Cacopsylla agellialta
- C. lapidea
- C. popovi
- C. taurica
- Cretohexura coylei
- Cretobestiola communis
- Cretothyrea optanda
- Cretoglaphyrus olenguicus
- C. zherikhini
- C. calvescens
- C. leptopterus
- C. transbaikalicus
- Cretolucanus longus
- C. ordinarius
- C. sibericus
- Cionocoleus sibiricus
- Dolichoderus tavridus
- D. taurica
- D. tauricus
- Lithoscarabaeus baissensis
- Metabuprestium cuneomaculatum
- Myangadina tetrops
- Prototrox transbaikalicus
- Priacma striata
- Prosusumania semenica
- Proteroscarbaeus yeni
- Pamparaphilius semen
- Trematothorax ingodensis
- Zygadenia semen
- Z. sibirica
- Z. sinitzae
- Irenichthys sp.
- Archostemata indet.
- Cupedidae indet.
- Prototroginae indet.

== See also ==
- Argun terrane
