= P. serrata =

P. serrata may refer to:

- Paralomis serrata, a species of king crab
- Parbattia serrata, a species of moth in the family Crambidae
- Pauridia serrata, a species of flowering plant in the family Hypoxidaceae
- Pityrodia serrata, a species of flowering plant in the family Lamiaceae
- Priacma serrata, a species of reticulated beetle in the family Cupedidae
- Prionolopha serrata, a species of grasshopper in the family Romaleidae
- Pseudopostega serrata, a species of moth in the family Opostegidae
- Pterolophia serrata, a species of beetle in the family Cerambycidae
- Pyroteuthis serrata, a species of squid in the family Pyroteuthidae
