= Adinolepis =

Scientific classification
- Kingdom: Animalia
- Phylum: Arthropoda
- Clade: Pancrustacea
- Class: Insecta
- Order: Coleoptera
- Family: Cupedidae
- Genus: Adinolepis; Neboiss, 1984

Species
- 4 (see text)

Genus of beetles

Adinolepis is a genus of Archostematid beetles that belongs to the family Cupedidae (reticulated beetles). All known species are endemic to Australia.

== Taxonomy ==
The genus was described by Arturs Neboiss in 1984 along with four other genera: Tenomerga, Distocupes, Ascioplaga and Rhipsideigma.

=== Species ===
The genus currently contains four described species. A fifth species, Adinolepis scalena, was transferred to genus Ascioplaga in 2009.

A list of species can be found below:

- Adinolepis apodema Neboiss, 1987
- Adinolepis eumana (Neboiss, 1960)
- Adinolepis mathesonae (Neboiss, 1960)
- Adinolepis youanga (Neboiss, 1960)
