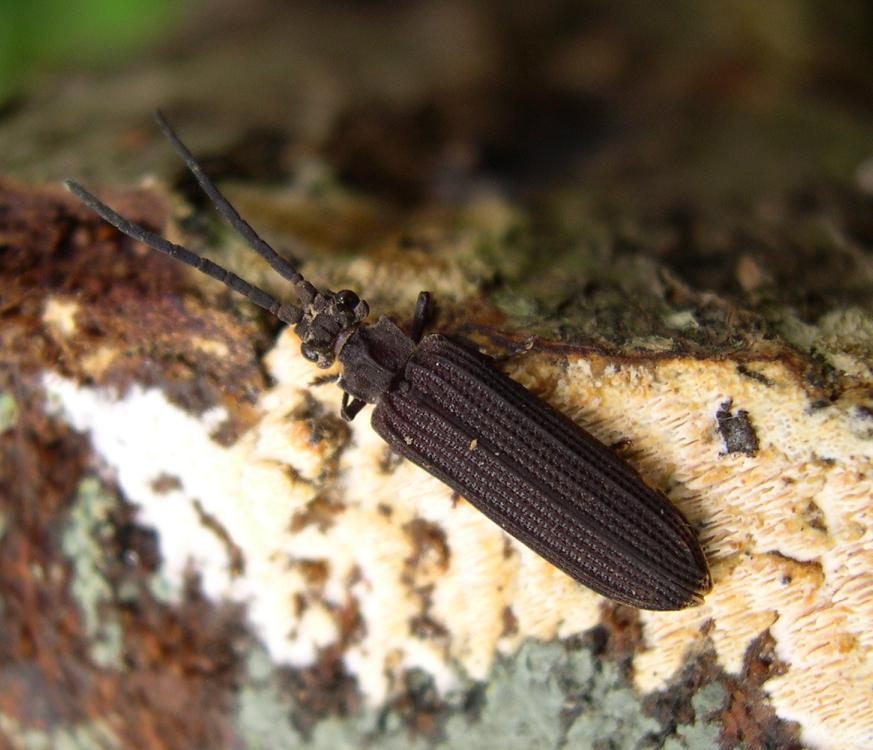
- Tenomerga mucida

Scientific classification
- Domain: Eukaryota
- Kingdom: Animalia
- Phylum: Arthropoda
- Class: Insecta
- Order: Coleoptera
- Family: Cupedidae
- Genus: Tenomerga; Neboiss, 1984

= Tenomerga =

Genus of beetles

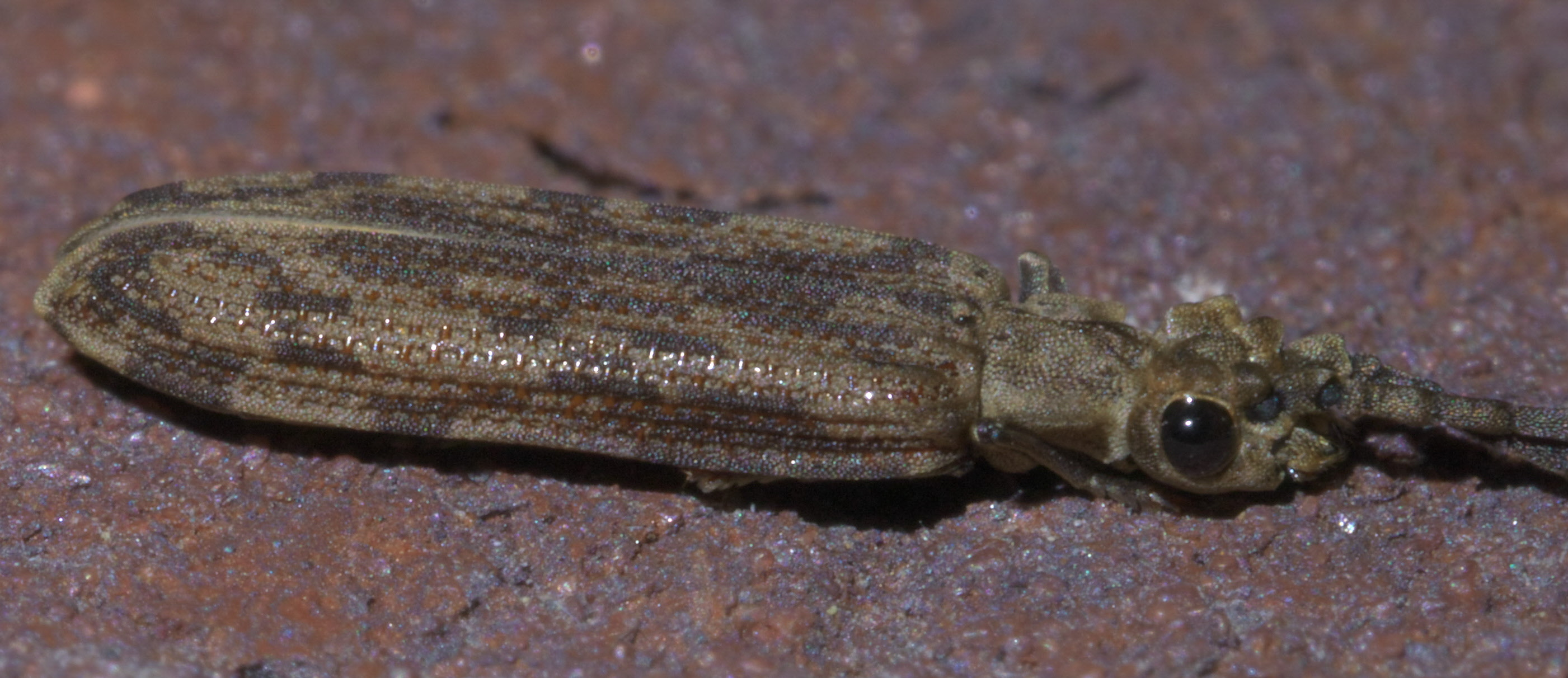
Tenomerga cinerea

Tenomerga is a genus of beetles in the family Cupedidae. This genus has about 17 extant species, which are native to the eastern Palearctic, Nearctic and Oriental regions.

In a recent phylogenetic analysis, the species Tenomerga leucophaea was found to form a monophyletic group with Cupes capitatus and Rhipsideigma, rendering Tenomerga polyphyletic. Because of this, some researchers have proposed transferring T. leucophaea to Cupes.

== Species ==
These 14 species belong to the genus Tenomerga:

- Tenomerga anguliscutis (Kolbe, 1886)^{i c g}
- Tenomerga cinerea (Say, 1831)^{i c g b}
- Tenomerga favella Neboiss, 1984^{i c g}
- Tenomerga gaolingziensis Ge and Yang, 2004^{i c g}
- Tenomerga japonica (Tamanuki, 1928)^{i c g}
- Tenomerga kapnodes Neboiss, 1984^{i c g}
- Tenomerga kurosawai Miyatake, 1986^{i c g}
- Tenomerga leucophaea (Newman, 1839)^{i c g}
- Tenomerga moultonii (Gestro, 1910)^{i c g}
- Tenomerga mucida (Chevrolat, 1844)^{i c g}
- Tenomerga sibyllae (Klapperich, 1950)^{i c g}
- Tenomerga tianmuensis Ge and Yang, 2004^{i c g}
- Tenomerga trabecula Neboiss, 1984^{i c g}
- Tenomerga yamato Miyatake, 1985^{i c g}

Data sources: i = ITIS, c = Catalogue of Life, g = GBIF, b = Bugguide.net
