= Adinolepis eumana =

Scientific classification
- Kingdom: Animalia
- Phylum: Arthropoda
- Clade: Pancrustacea
- Class: Insecta
- Order: Coleoptera
- Family: Cupedidae
- Genus: Adinolepis
- Species: A. eumana

Binomial name
- Adinolepis eumana (Neboiss, 1960)

Species of beetle

Adinolepis eumana is a species of Archostematid beetles that belongs to the family Cupedidae (reticulated beetles). Theis species is native to Western Australia.

The species was described in 1960 by Arturs Neboiss, a Latvian entomologist.

== Description ==
Currently, only the females have been described with males being unknown. Females can reach a length of 7.8 mm with a maximum width of 2 mm. Their heads are densely covered in pale sandy brown scales that are irregularly intermixed with individual dark brown scale. The elytra dorsally flattened.
