= Adinolepis apodema =

Scientific classification
- Kingdom: Animalia
- Phylum: Arthropoda
- Clade: Pancrustacea
- Class: Insecta
- Order: Coleoptera
- Family: Cupedidae
- Genus: Adinolepis
- Species: A. apodema

Binomial name
- Adinolepis apodema Neboiss, 1987

Species of beetle

Adinolepis apodema is a species of Archostematid beetle that belongs to the family Cupedidae (reticulated beetles). This species is native to Western Australia.

The species was described in 1987 by Arturs Neboiss, a Latvian entomologist. Its description meant that it is the first record of the family Cupedidae from Western Australia.
