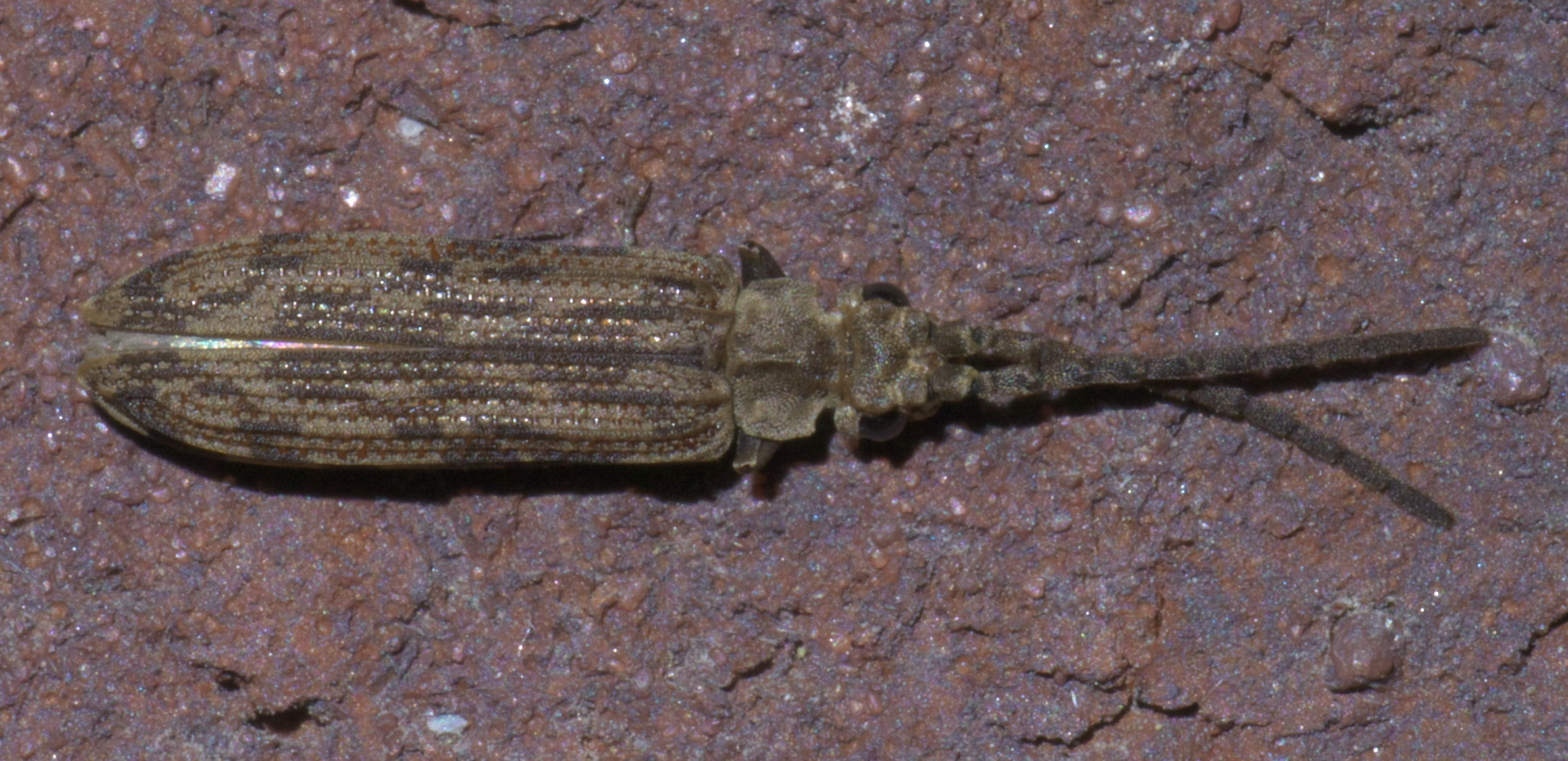

Scientific classification
- Kingdom: Animalia
- Phylum: Arthropoda
- Class: Insecta
- Order: Coleoptera
- Family: Cupedidae
- Genus: Tenomerga
- Species: T. cinerea

Binomial name
- Tenomerga cinerea (Say, 1831)

Synonyms
- Cupes cinerea Westwood, 1835; Cupes concolor (Westwood, 1835); Cupes oculatus Say, 1835; Cupes trilineata Melsheimer, 1846; Tenomerga concolor Casey, 1897

= Tenomerga cinerea =

Species of beetle

Tenomerga cinerea is a species of reticulated beetle in the family Cupedidae. It is found in North America.

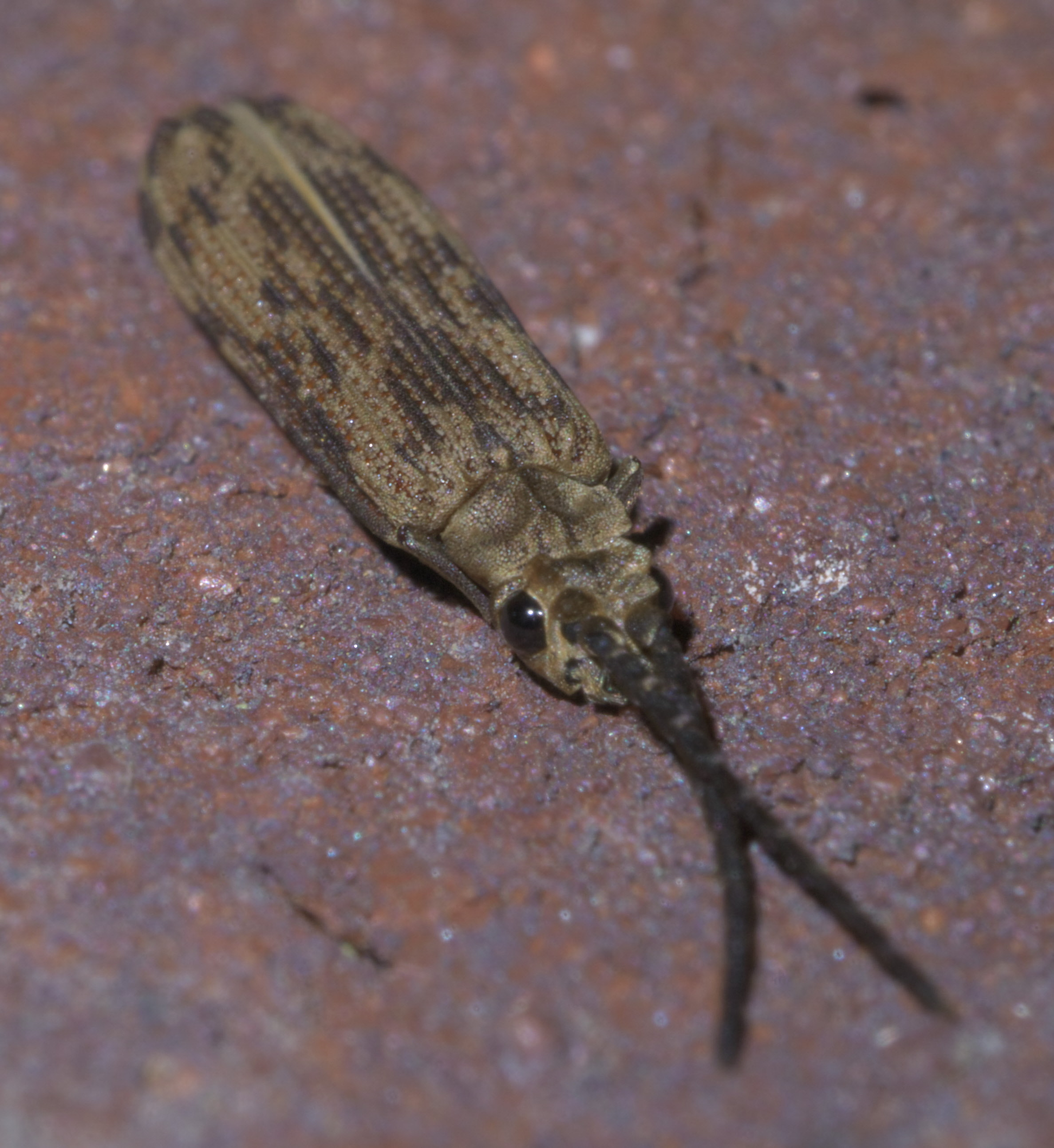

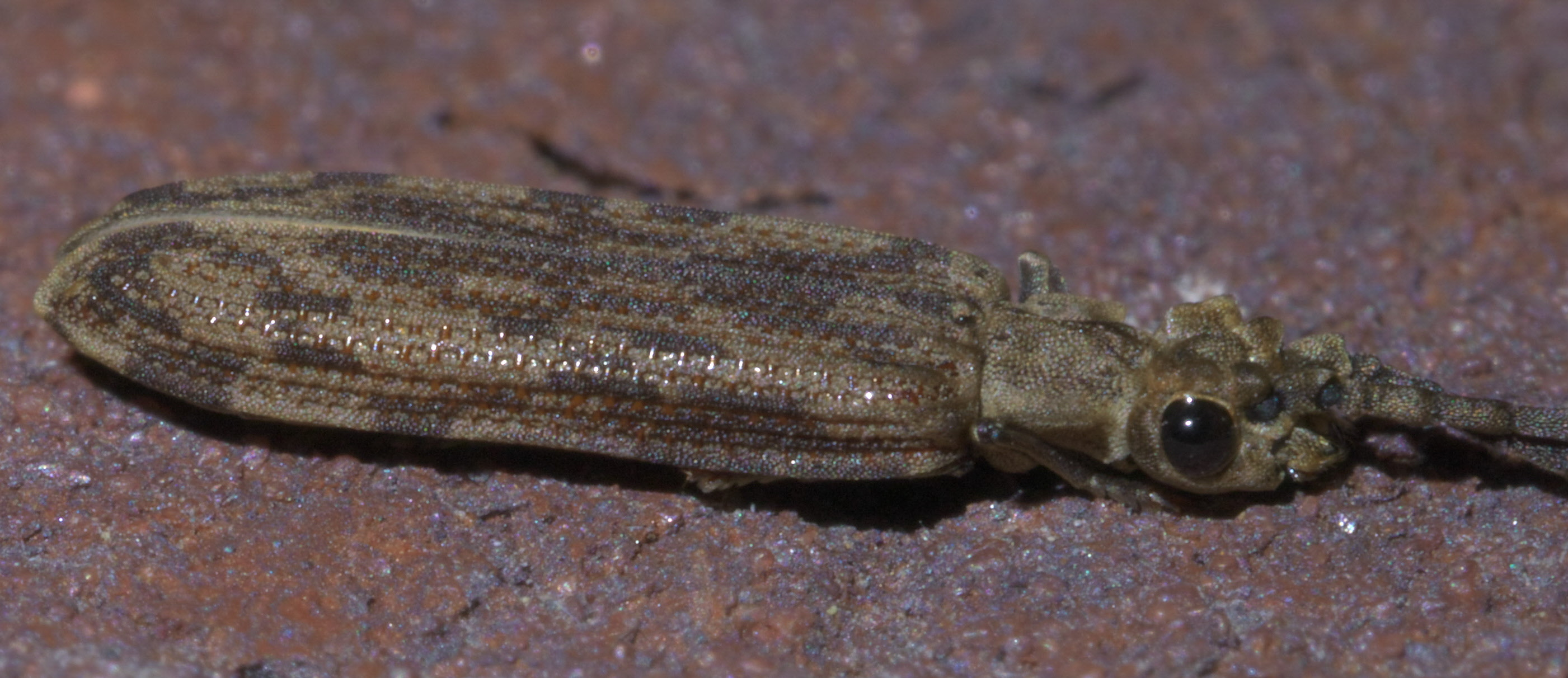
