= Pterygioteuthis hoylei =

Conservation status
- Data Deficient (IUCN 3.1)

Scientific classification
- Kingdom: Animalia
- Phylum: Mollusca
- Class: Cephalopoda
- Order: Oegopsida
- Family: Pyroteuthidae
- Genus: Pterygioteuthis
- Species: P. hoylei

Binomial name
- Pterygioteuthis hoylei (Pfeffer, 1912

Synonyms
- Pyroteuthis (Pterygioteuthis) giardi hoylei Pfeffer, 1912

Species of squid

Pterygioteuthis hoylei is a species of squid in the family Pyroteuthidae. It is considered conspecific with Pterygioteuthis giardi by some authorities. It can be identified from P. giardi by having four photophores on the tentacles and many chromatophores spread along the tentacle stalk and around the aboral surface of the tentacular club. It is also slightly larger than P. giardi, it has been so far recorded only from the eastern tropical Pacific Ocean where it is the only species of in the family Pyroteuthidae to occur there, although its actual distribution may be wider than currently known. The specific name honours the British malacologist William Evans Hoyle (1855–1926).
