= Cupes manifestus =

Cupes manifestus Temporal range: Paleocene

Scientific classification
- Domain: Eukaryota
- Kingdom: Animalia
- Phylum: Arthropoda
- Class: Insecta
- Order: Coleoptera
- Family: Cupedidae
- Genus: Cupes
- Species: †C. manifestus

Binomial name
- †Cupes manifestus Kirejtshuk et al., 2010

Species of insect (fossil)

Cupes manifestus is an extinct species of reticulated beetle in the family Cupedidae and the genus Cupes. It is known from Selandian crater lake diatomite in the Menat Formation of France.
