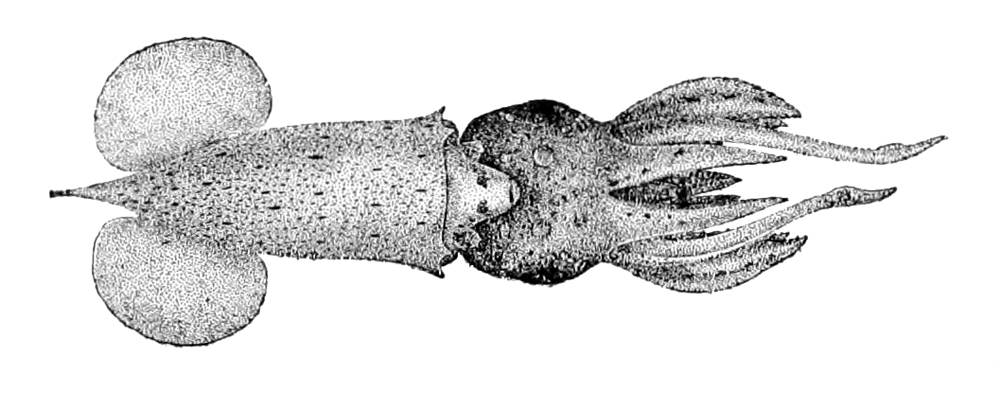
- Ventral view of female

Conservation status
- Least Concern (IUCN 3.1)

Scientific classification
- Kingdom: Animalia
- Phylum: Mollusca
- Class: Cephalopoda
- Order: Oegopsida
- Family: Pyroteuthidae
- Genus: Pterygioteuthis
- Species: P. microlampas

Binomial name
- Pterygioteuthis microlampas Berry, 1913

= Pterygioteuthis microlampas =

Species of squid

Pterygioteuthis microlampas is a species of squid in the family Pyroteuthidae. They occur from northern New Zealand oceans to the Hawaiian Islands, but they do not overlap with the species P. gemmata, which lives in more southern waters. While there are numerous similarities between these two species, they are separated by the smaller mature size of P. microlampas (maximum mantle length of 23 mm) and the fewer number of hooks on males. The species reproduce sexually during the late autumn to early winter, producing eggs with a diameter of 0.9 mm.
