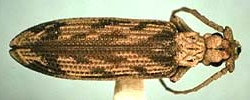

Scientific classification
- Kingdom: Animalia
- Phylum: Arthropoda
- Class: Insecta
- Order: Coleoptera
- Family: Cupedidae
- Genus: Prolixocupes
- Species: P. lobiceps

Binomial name
- Prolixocupes lobiceps (LeConte, 1874)

Synonyms
- Cupes lobiceps LeConte, 1874; Cupes boycei Papp, 1961

= Prolixocupes lobiceps =

Species of beetle

Prolixocupes lobiceps is a species of reticulated beetle in the family Cupedidae. It is found in North America.
