= Cupes groehni =

Cupes groehni Temporal range: Paleocene

Scientific classification
- Kingdom: Animalia
- Phylum: Arthropoda
- Class: Insecta
- Order: Coleoptera
- Family: Cupedidae
- Genus: Cupes
- Species: †C. groehni

Binomial name
- †Cupes groehni Kirejtshuk, 2005

Species of insect (fossil)

Cupes groehni is an extinct species of reticulated beetle in the family Cupedidae and the genus Cupes. The species is known from Eocene-era Baltic amber.

== Etymology ==
The specific epithet groehni is devoted to Carsten Gröhn, a German paleontologist and amber expert.

== Description ==
Specimens recovered from amber measured 8.7–11.5mm in length, 2.6–3.0mm in width, and 1.5–1.6mm in height, with one female holotype measuring 10.7mm in length, 3.0mm in width, and 1.6mm in height. Females of the species typically possess a wider pronotum than males and appear smaller in size.
