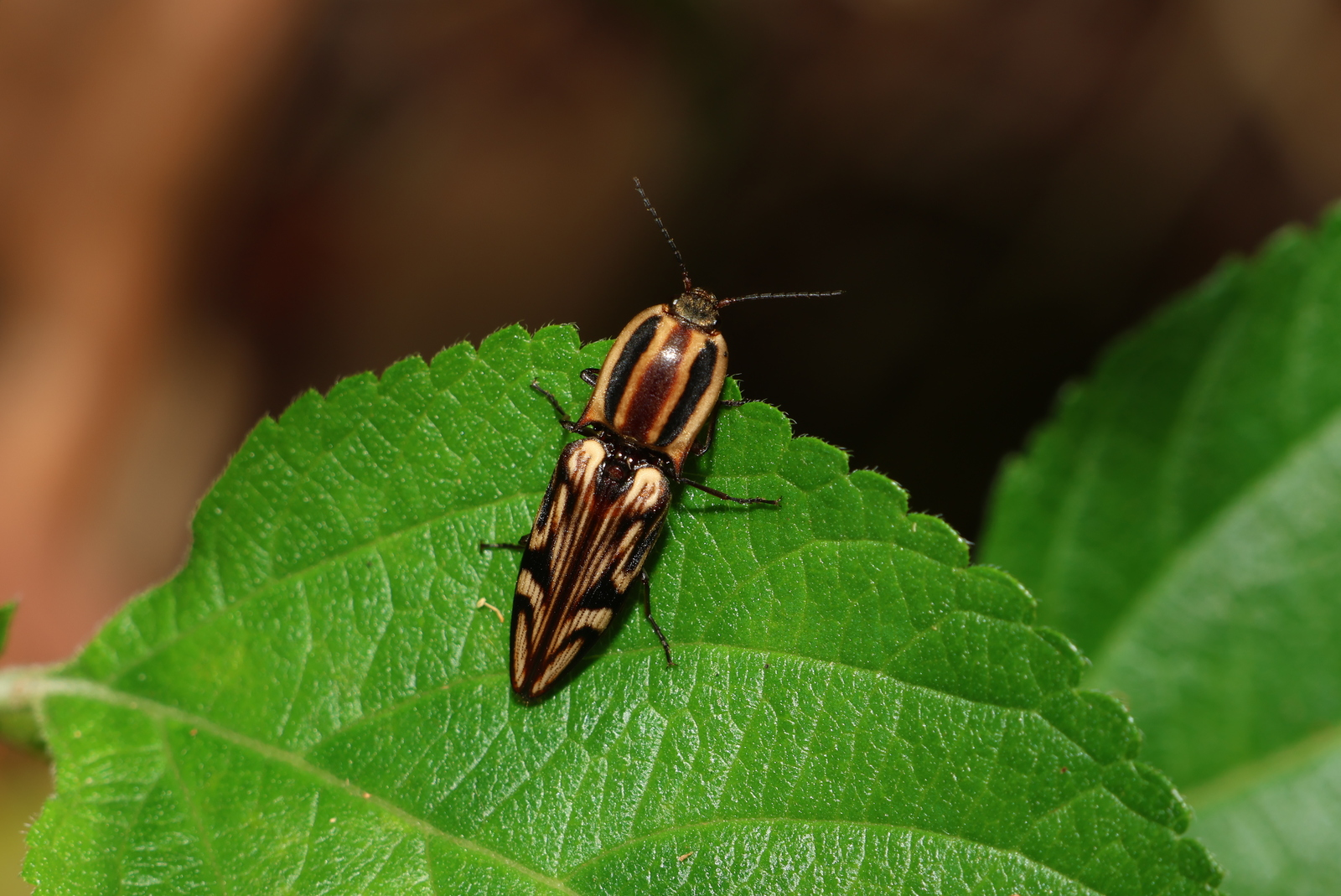
- Ophidius histrio photographed in Booroobin, Queensland
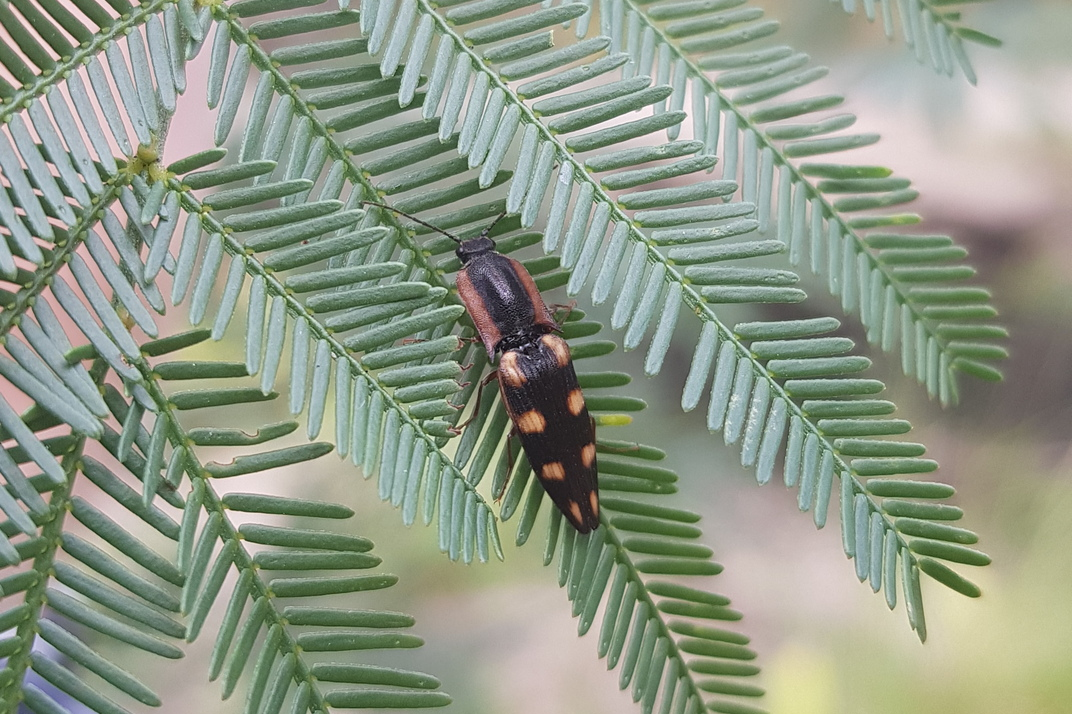
- Ophidius dracunculus photographed in Garigal National Park

Scientific classification
- Kingdom: Animalia
- Phylum: Arthropoda
- Clade: Pancrustacea
- Class: Insecta
- Order: Coleoptera
- Suborder: Polyphaga
- Infraorder: Elateriformia
- Family: Elateridae
- Subfamily: Parablacinae
- Genus: Ophidius; Candèze, 1863

Type species
- Ophidius elegans Candèze, 1863

Species
- O. dracunculus Candèze, 1863; O. elegans Candèze, 1863; O. histrio (Boisduval, 1835); O. vericulatus Neboiss, 1975

= Ophidius =

Genus of beetles

Ophidius is a genus of click beetles in the subfamily Parablacinae. It includes four species, all endemic to eastern Australia.

== Taxonomy and history ==
Belgian entomologist Ernest Candèze described the genus Ophidius and two new species, Ophidius dracunculus and the type species Ophidius elegans, in 1863. Alongside the descriptions of O. dracunculus and O. elegans, Candèze transferred the species Elater histrio into the new genus, combining it as Ophidius histrio. Over the following decades, three new species of Ophidius would be described: Ophidius brevicornis was described by William John Macleay in 1872, Ophidius serricornis was described by Candèze in 1878, and Ophidius macleayi was described by Candèze in 1895. All three would later be excluded from Ophidius and transferred into other genera on the basis of morphological characteristics in a 1975 paper by Arturs Neboiss, then the curator of insects at the National Museum of Victoria. Neboiss' paper also described the new species Ophidius vericulatus, leaving four species in the genus.

Candèze initially placed Ophidius in the elaterid subtribe Crépidoménites alongside the genera Crepidomenus and Blax (now Metablax) in 1863. This grouping would later be recharacterised as the subfamily Crepidomeninae by German entomologist Sigmund Schenkling in 1927, however, a 1986 analysis of the subfamily by Andrew A. Calder found that Ophidius was not a member of this group, leaving it unplaced until 1996, when Calder placed it within the subfamily Elaterinae. A 2016 review of Elateridae would ultimately place Ophidius within the newly created subfamily Parablacinae.

== Distribution and habitat ==
Ophidius is endemic to Australia. All species in this genus are native to eastern Queensland and/or New South Wales, ranging from the Atherton Tableland in the north to Monaro in the south. They can be found in wet sclerophyll forests and at the edges of rainforests.

== Description ==
Adults of this genus are brightly coloured, distinctive beetles with orange-brown and black markings, ranging in size from 12 mm (0.47 in) to 25 mm (0.98 in) long depending on species. The head is convex with short antennae and the pronotum is covered in fine hairs. The scutellum is vertically raised with a flat or slightly dome-shaped top. The legs are short, with four distinctly rounded pads on the tarsi.

== Species ==
This genus includes the following species:

- Ophidius dracunculus Candèze, 1863
- Ophidius elegans Candèze, 1863
- Ophidius histrio (Boisduval, 1835)
- Ophidius vericulatus Neboiss, 1975

Species formerly placed in this genus include:

- Ophidius brevicornis Macleay, 1872 – now accepted as Paranilicus brevicornis (Macleay, 1872)
- Ophidius serricornis Candèze, 1878 – now accepted as Yalganus serricornis (Candèze, 1878)
- Ophidius macleayi Candèze, 1895 – now accepted as Rangsia macleayi (Candèze, 1895)
