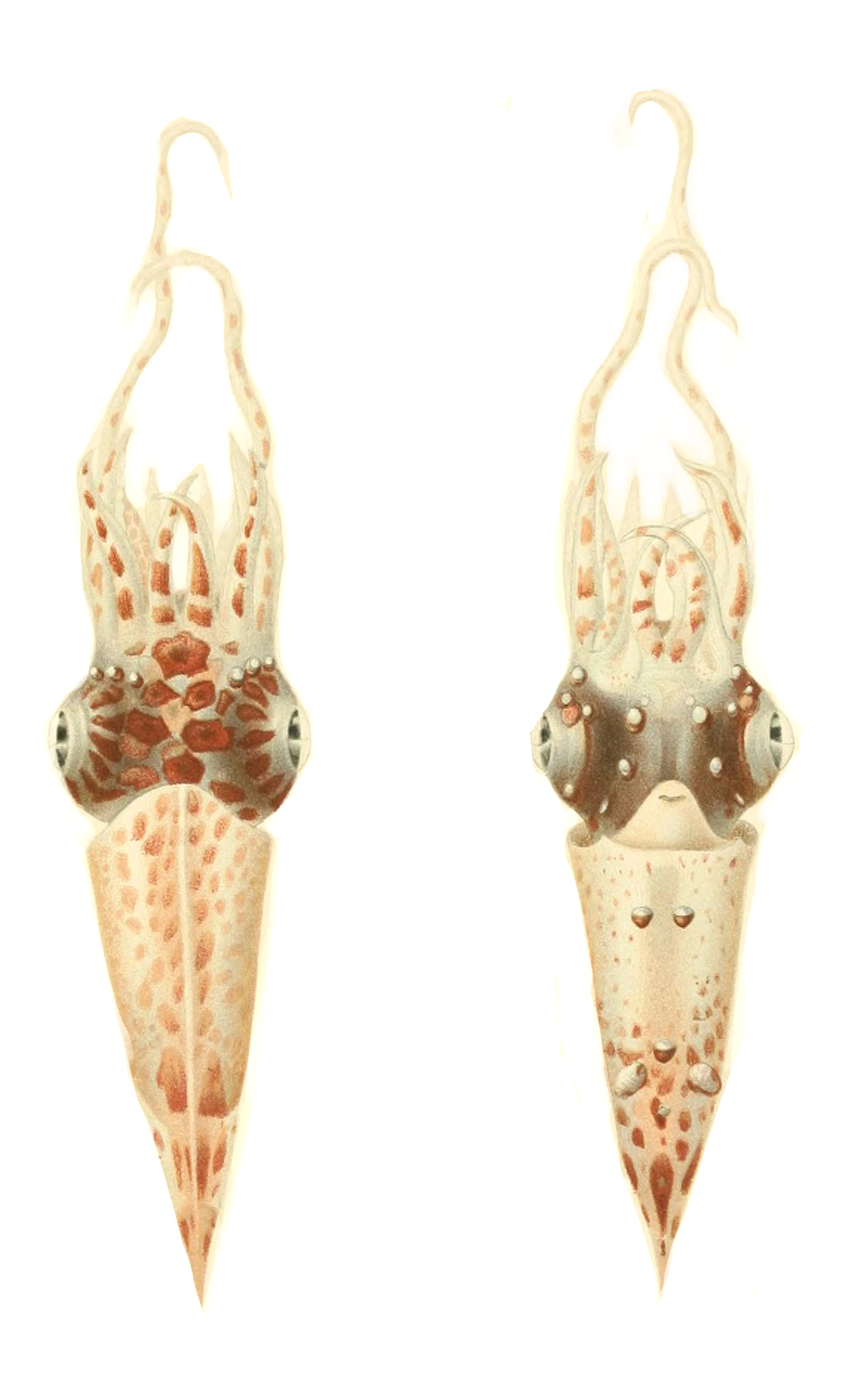
- Pterygioteuthis giardi

Scientific classification
- Kingdom: Animalia
- Phylum: Mollusca
- Class: Cephalopoda
- Order: Oegopsida
- Family: Pyroteuthidae
- Genus: Pterygioteuthis; H. Fischer, 1896

Type species
- Pterygioteuthis giardi Fischer, 1896

Species
- Pterygioteuthis gemmata Chun, 1908; Pterygioteuthis giardi Fischer, 1896; Pterygioteuthis hoylei (Pfeffer, 1912); Pterygioteuthis microlampas Berry, 1913

= Pterygioteuthis =

Genus of squids

Pterygioteuthis is a genus of squid in the family Pyroteuthidae. Members are differentiated from the genus Pyroteuthis due to size and head shape. The genus is characterised by the presence of a lidded photophore over each eye.
