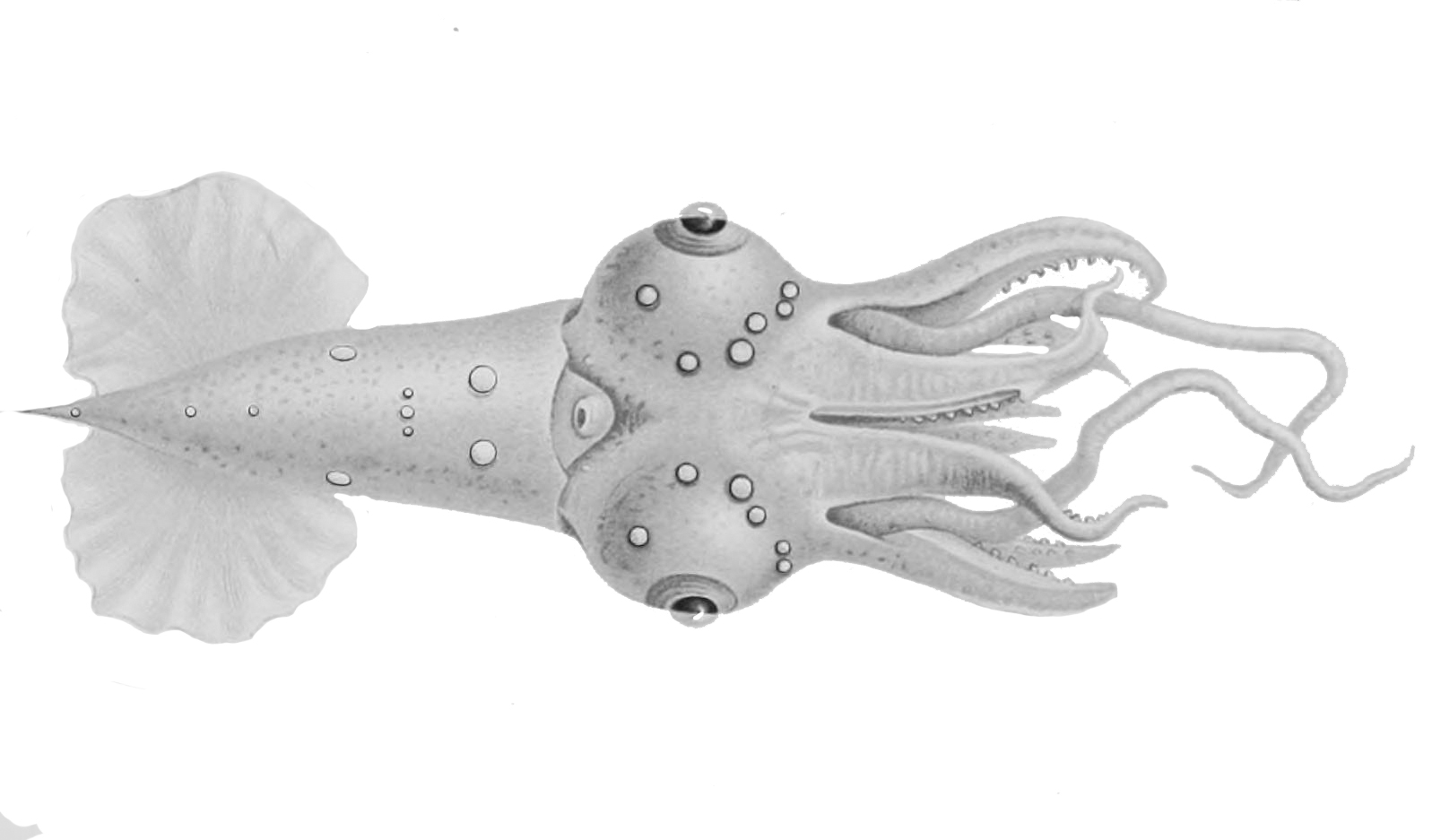

Scientific classification
- Kingdom: Animalia
- Phylum: Mollusca
- Class: Cephalopoda
- Order: Oegopsida
- Superfamily: Enoploteuthoidea
- Family: Pyroteuthidae; Pfeffer, 1912

Type genus
- Pyroteuthis Hoyle, 1904

Genera
- Pterygioteuthis; Pyroteuthis

= Pyroteuthidae =

Family of squids

Pyroteuthidae (the fire squids) is a family of squids. The family comprises two genera. Species are diurnally mesopelagic, migrating into surface waters during the night. The family is characterised by the tentacles, which have a permanent constriction and bend near the base; and photophores occurring on the tentacles, eyeballs, and viscera. Members reach mantle lengths of 23–50 mm. Paralarvae of the family are common around the Hawaiian Islands, with up to 17% of collected specimens in the area belonging to Pyroteuthidae.

== Species ==
- Genus Pterygioteuthis
  - Pterygioteuthis gemmata
  - Pterygioteuthis giardi, roundear enope squid
  - Pterygioteuthis hoylei
  - Pterygioteuthis microlampas
- Genus Pyroteuthis
  - Pyroteuthis addolux
  - Pyroteuthis margaritifera, jewel enope squid
  - Pyroteuthis serrata
