= Paracupes =

Scientific classification
- Kingdom: Animalia
- Phylum: Arthropoda
- Class: Insecta
- Order: Coleoptera
- Family: Cupedidae
- Genus: Paracupes; Kolbe, 1898

Synonyms
- Paracupoides Kirejtshuk, Nel & Kirejtshuk, 2016

Genus of beetles

Paracupes is a genus of beetles in the family Cupedidae, the reticulated beetles.

There are three extant species:

- Paracupes ascius Neboiss, 1989 – Ecuador
- Paracupes brasiliensis Kolbe, 1898 – Brazil
- Paracupes mexicanus Rodríguez-Mirón & López-Pérez, 2019 – Chiapas, Mexico
