= Pyroteuthis addolux =

Conservation status
- Least Concern (IUCN 3.1)

Scientific classification
- Kingdom: Animalia
- Phylum: Mollusca
- Class: Cephalopoda
- Order: Oegopsida
- Family: Pyroteuthidae
- Genus: Pyroteuthis
- Species: P. addolux

Binomial name
- Pyroteuthis addolux Young, 1972

Species of squid

Pyroteuthis addolux is a species of squid in the family Pyroteuthidae. It is distinguished from other members of the genus Pyroteuthis by the shape of photophores on the tentacles and the shape of the hectocotylus. The hectocotylus is located on arm IV, containing 10 proximity hooks, and six to 15 suckers at the tip. P. addolux ranges from south of the Hawaiian Islands, to the subantarctic boundary. They exhibit minor geographical variance, as southern specimens are slightly smaller than their northern counterparts. P. addolux is the only member of the genus to occur in the North Pacific, but additional members of the family Pyroteuthidae have also been found. The species has been observed using bioluminescence to reduce its silhouette in dim surrounding light. The type specimen was taken off southern California and described in 1972 by Richard E. Young.

Pyroteuthis addolux apparently undergoes a diel vertical migration in which it spends the day at depths of 450-500 m before ascending to 150-200 m at night to feed, most likely on copepods and other small crustaceans. The larger individuals do not appear to migrate each night. The oocytes contained in the ovary of a sexually mature female had a length of 1.0 mm, when they hatch they produce planktonic paralarva. The males have short spermatophores.
