= Pyroteuthis serrata =

Conservation status
- Data Deficient (IUCN 3.1)

Scientific classification
- Kingdom: Animalia
- Phylum: Mollusca
- Class: Cephalopoda
- Order: Oegopsida
- Family: Pyroteuthidae
- Genus: Pyroteuthis
- Species: P. serrata

Binomial name
- Pyroteuthis serrata Riddell, 1985

Species of squid

Pyroteuthis serrata is a species of squid in the family Pyroteuthidae. It is found north of the tropical convergence in the waters around New Zealand and it does not overlap with Pyroteuthis margaritifera which has a more southerly range.
