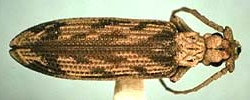
- Prolixocupes lobiceps

Scientific classification
- Domain: Eukaryota
- Kingdom: Animalia
- Phylum: Arthropoda
- Class: Insecta
- Order: Coleoptera
- Family: Cupedidae
- Genus: Prolixocupes; Neboiss, 1960

Species
- Prolixocupes latreillei (Solier, 1849); Prolixocupes lobiceps (Leconte, 1874)

= Prolixocupes =

Genus of beetles

Prolixocupes is a genus of beetles in the family Cupedidae. It contains two species, P. latreillei and P. lobiceps. The former is endemic to central Chile and adjacent areas of western Argentina between 25° and 35° S, while the latter is endemic to Arizona and California in Western North America.
