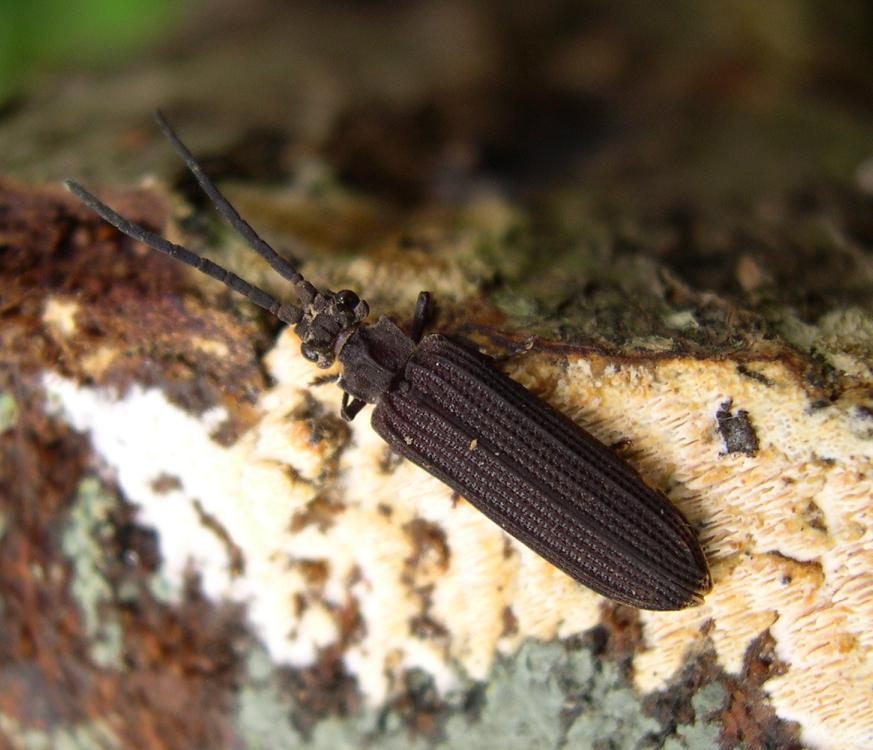

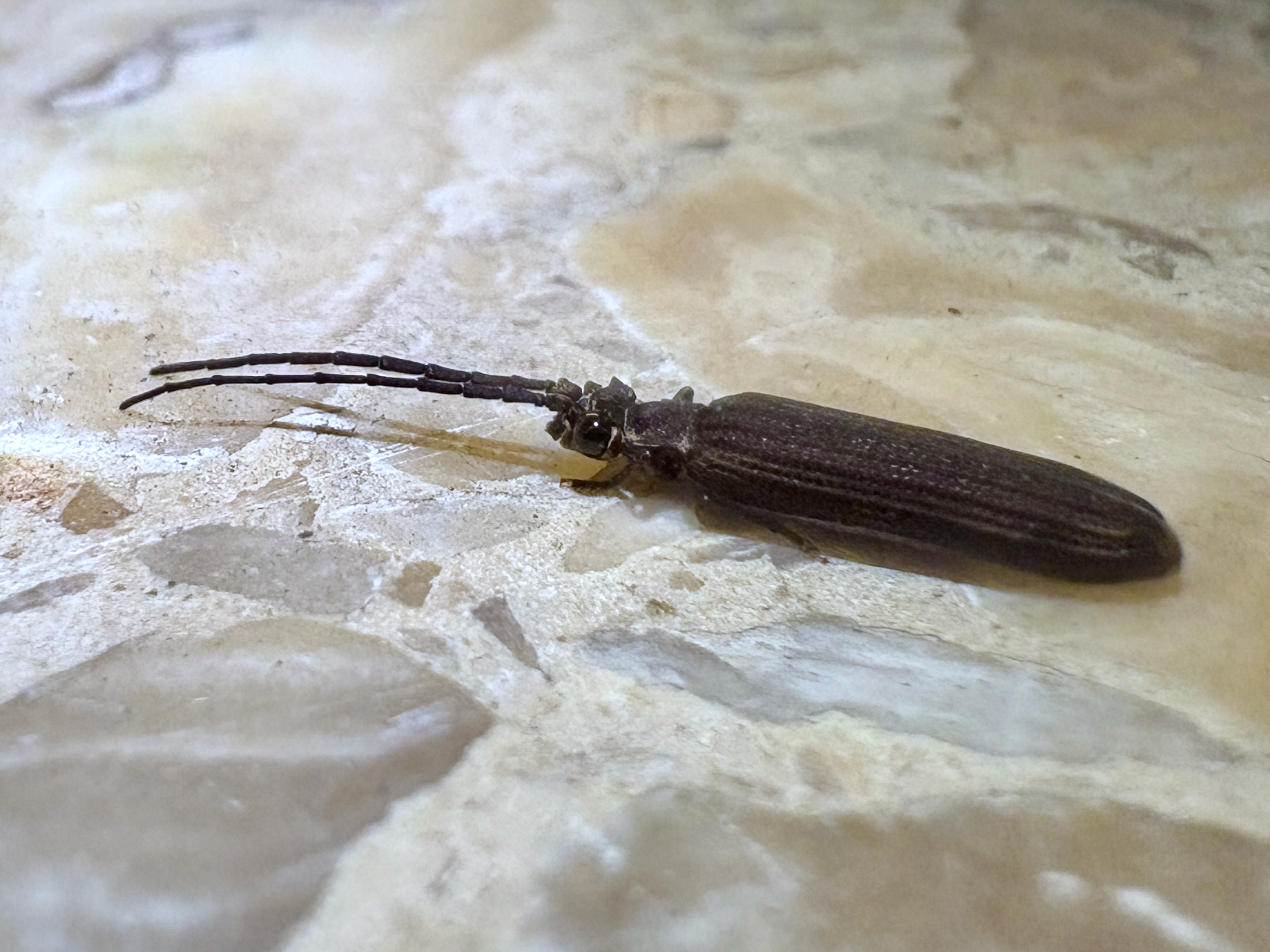

Scientific classification
- Kingdom: Animalia
- Phylum: Arthropoda
- Clade: Pancrustacea
- Class: Insecta
- Order: Coleoptera
- Family: Cupedidae
- Genus: Tenomerga
- Species: T. mucida

Binomial name
- Tenomerga mucida Chevrolat in Guérin-Méneville, 1844

Synonyms
- Cupes mucida Chevrolat in Guérin-Méneville, 1844; Cupes mucidus Chevrolat in Guérin-Méneville, 1844; Cupes clathratus Solsky, 1871; Cupes clathratus fuscus Tamanuki, 1928; Cupes clathratus var. fuscus Tamanuki, 1928; Cupes mucidus Chevrolat in Guerin-Meneville, 1844; Cupes ocularis Pascoe, 1872

= Tenomerga mucida =

Species of beetle

Tenomerga mucida is a species of reticulated beetle in the family Cupedidae. It is found primarily in East Asia.
