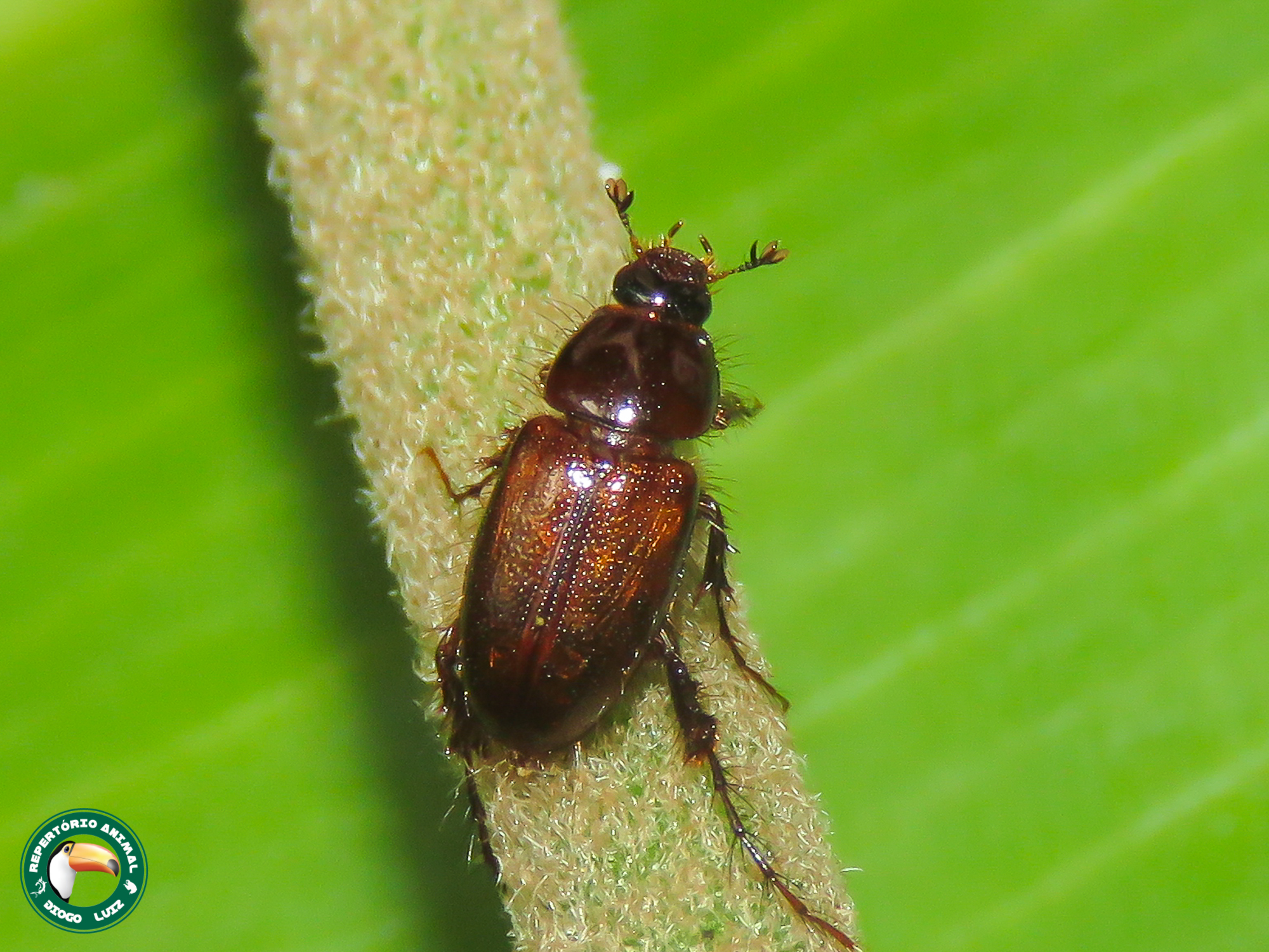
- Aclopus species from Brazil.
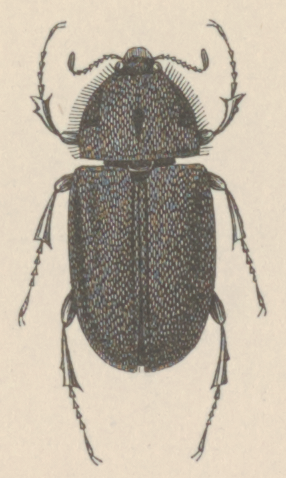
- Illustration of Aclopus vittatus from Iconographia Zoologica

Scientific classification
- Kingdom: Animalia
- Phylum: Arthropoda
- Clade: Pancrustacea
- Class: Insecta
- Order: Coleoptera
- Suborder: Polyphaga
- Infraorder: Scarabaeiformia
- Family: Scarabaeidae
- Subfamily: Aclopinae
- Tribe: Aclopini
- Genus: Aclopus; Erichson, 1835

Species
- 6 (see text)

= Aclopus =

Genus of beetles

Aclopus is a genus of scarab beetles that belongs to the subfamily Aclopinae. Members of this genus are found in Brazil.

== Taxonomy ==
This genus was described in 1835 by Wilhelm Ferdinand Erichson, a German entomologist and medical doctor. In 1909, Arrow considered aclopines to be laparostict scarabs. This was based on observation of the abdominal spiracles of Aclopus brunneus. This classification is no longer the case.

=== Species ===
There are currently six species that belong to this genus. Below is a list of species:

- Aclopus brunneus Erichson, 1835
- Aclopus intermedius Blanchard, 1850
- Aclopus parvulus
- Aclopus robustus Arrow, 1909
- Aclopus vittatus Erichson, 1835
- Aclopus wuenschei Ohaus, 1912
