= Ascioplaga =

Scientific classification
- Kingdom: Animalia
- Phylum: Arthropoda
- Clade: Pancrustacea
- Class: Insecta
- Order: Coleoptera
- Suborder: Archostemata
- Family: Cupedidae
- Genus: Ascioplaga; Neboiss, 1984

Species
- Ascioplaga mimeta Neboiss, 1984; Ascioplaga scalena (Neboiss, 1984); Ascioplaga sciasma Neboiss, 1984

Genus of beetles

Ascioplaga is a genus of beetles in the family Cupedidae within the suborder Archostemata. The genus contains two species endemic to New Caledonia and one described from northern Queensland in Australia.

The Australian species, Ascioplaga scalena, was originally described as a species of Adinolepis, and was transferred to Ascioplaga in 2009. Research on this species’ internal head anatomy, specifically mouthparts and musculature, clarified evolutionary aspects of this species and its deeper role in the order Coleoptera.
