= Parbattia excavata =

Scientific classification
- Domain: Eukaryota
- Kingdom: Animalia
- Phylum: Arthropoda
- Class: Insecta
- Order: Lepidoptera
- Family: Crambidae
- Genus: Parbattia
- Species: P. excavata

Binomial name
- Parbattia excavata Zhang, Li & Wang in Zhang, Li, Wang & Song, 2003

Species of moth

Parbattia excavata is a moth in the family Crambidae. It was described by Zhang, Li and Wang in 2003. It is found in China (Hubei).
