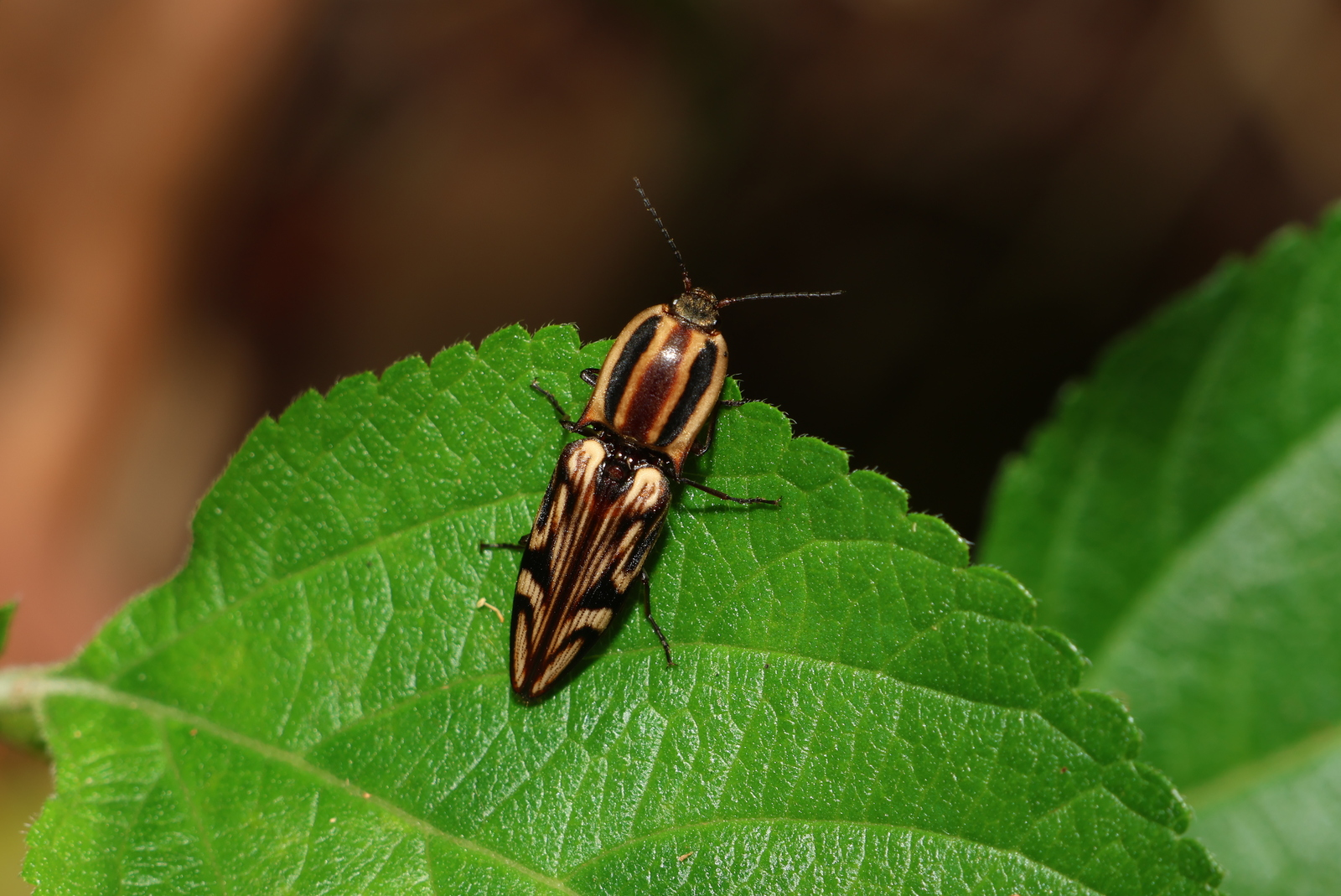
- Ophidius histrio photographed in Booroobin, Queensland

Scientific classification
- Kingdom: Animalia
- Phylum: Arthropoda
- Clade: Pancrustacea
- Class: Insecta
- Order: Coleoptera
- Suborder: Polyphaga
- Infraorder: Elateriformia
- Family: Elateridae
- Genus: Ophidius
- Species: O. histrio

Binomial name
- Ophidius histrio (Boisduval, 1835)

Synonyms
- Elater histrio Boisduval, 1835

= Ophidius histrio =

Species of beetle

Ophidius histrio is a species of click beetle in the genus Ophidius endemic to eastern Australia.

== Taxonomy and history ==
This species was described as Elater histrio by Jean Baptiste Boisduval in 1835 but was transferred to the genus Ophidius by Ernest Candèze in 1863.

== Distribution and habitat ==
Ophidius histrio is known from Queensland and New South Wales in eastern Australia.

== Description ==
Adult Ophidius histrio are distinctive orange-brown beetles with black markings, measuring approximately 15–22 mm (0.59–0.87 in) long and 4–6 mm (0.16–0.24 in) wide. The head is entirely black, while the pronotum is typically marked with three longitudinal black lines. The elytra each have a pattern of curved black lines. The larvae have not been described.

== Ecology ==
Ophidius histrio adults have been found on Syzygium smithii and on the flowers of Bursaria and Leptospermum.
