= Parbattia vialis =

Scientific classification
- Domain: Eukaryota
- Kingdom: Animalia
- Phylum: Arthropoda
- Class: Insecta
- Order: Lepidoptera
- Family: Crambidae
- Genus: Parbattia
- Species: P. vialis

Binomial name
- Parbattia vialis Moore, 1888

Species of moth

Parbattia vialis is a moth in the family Crambidae. It was described by Frederic Moore in 1888. It is found in Darjeeling, India.
