= Parbattia =

Scientific classification
- Domain: Eukaryota
- Kingdom: Animalia
- Phylum: Arthropoda
- Class: Insecta
- Order: Lepidoptera
- Family: Crambidae
- Subfamily: Pyraustinae
- Genus: Parbattia; Moore, 1888

Genus of moths

Parbattia is a genus of moths of the family Crambidae.

== Species ==
- Parbattia arisana Munroe & Mutuura, 1971
- Parbattia excavata Zhang, Li & Wang in Zhang, Li, Wang & Song, 2003
- Parbattia latifascialis South in Leech & South, 1901
- Parbattia serrata Munroe & Mutuura, 1971
- Parbattia vialis Moore, 1888

== Former species ==
- Parbattia aethiopicalis Hampson, 1913
