= Desertaclopus =

Scientific classification
- Kingdom: Animalia
- Phylum: Arthropoda
- Clade: Pancrustacea
- Class: Insecta
- Order: Coleoptera
- Suborder: Polyphaga
- Infraorder: Scarabaeiformia
- Family: Scarabaeidae
- Subfamily: Aclopinae
- Tribe: Aclopini
- Genus: Desertaclopus; Ocampo & Mondaca, 2012

Genus of beetles

Desertaclopus is a genus of scarab beetles that belongs to the subfamily Aclopinae. Members of this genus are found in Argentina and Chile. Desertaclopus was first described by Ocampo & Mondaca in 2012.

There are currently three species assigned to this genus:

- Desertaclopus atacamensis Ocampo & Mondaca, 2012
- Desertaclopus lucasi Ocampo & Mondaca, 2012
- Desertaclopus marcosi Ocampo & Mondaca, 2012
