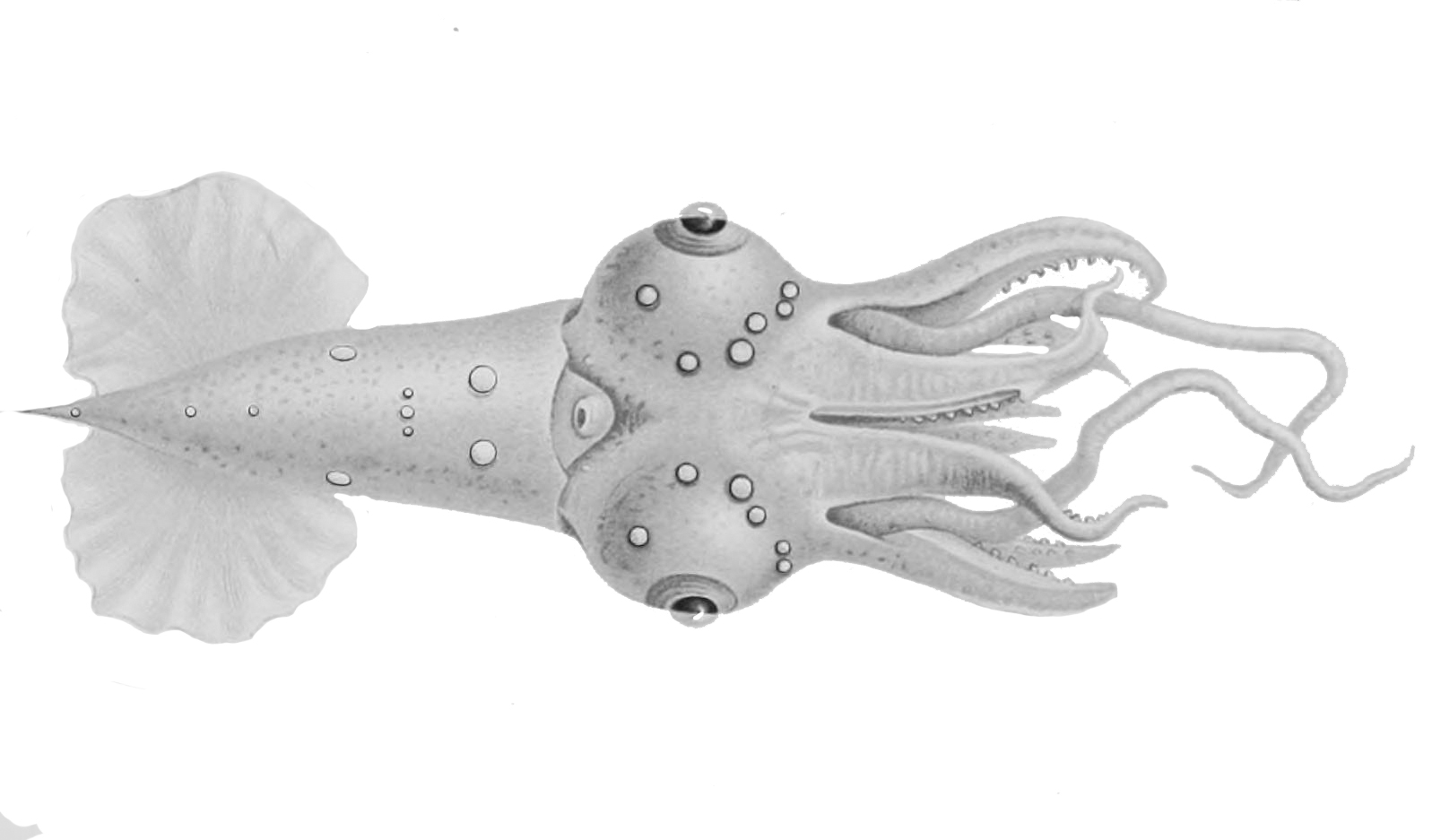
- Pyroteuthis margaritifera

Scientific classification
- Domain: Eukaryota
- Kingdom: Animalia
- Phylum: Mollusca
- Class: Cephalopoda
- Order: Oegopsida
- Family: Pyroteuthidae
- Genus: Pyroteuthis; Hoyle, 1904

Type species
- Enoploteuthis margaritifera Rüppell, 1844

Species
- Pyroteuthis addolux; Pyroteuthis margaritifera; Pyroteuthis serrata

Synonyms
- Charibditeuthis Vivanti, 1912

= Pyroteuthis =

Genus of squids

Pyroteuthis is a genus of squid in the family Pyroteuthidae. It is differentiated from the genus Pterygioteuthis by size, head shape and behaviour. Species within the genus are separated by the arrangement of tentacular photophores; the shape of the hectocotylus, and the shape of the hectocotylus hooks. With the exception of the Tropical Eastern Pacific, the genus is circumpolar in tropical and temperate oceans. The species P. addolux is the only member to occur in the North Pacific.
