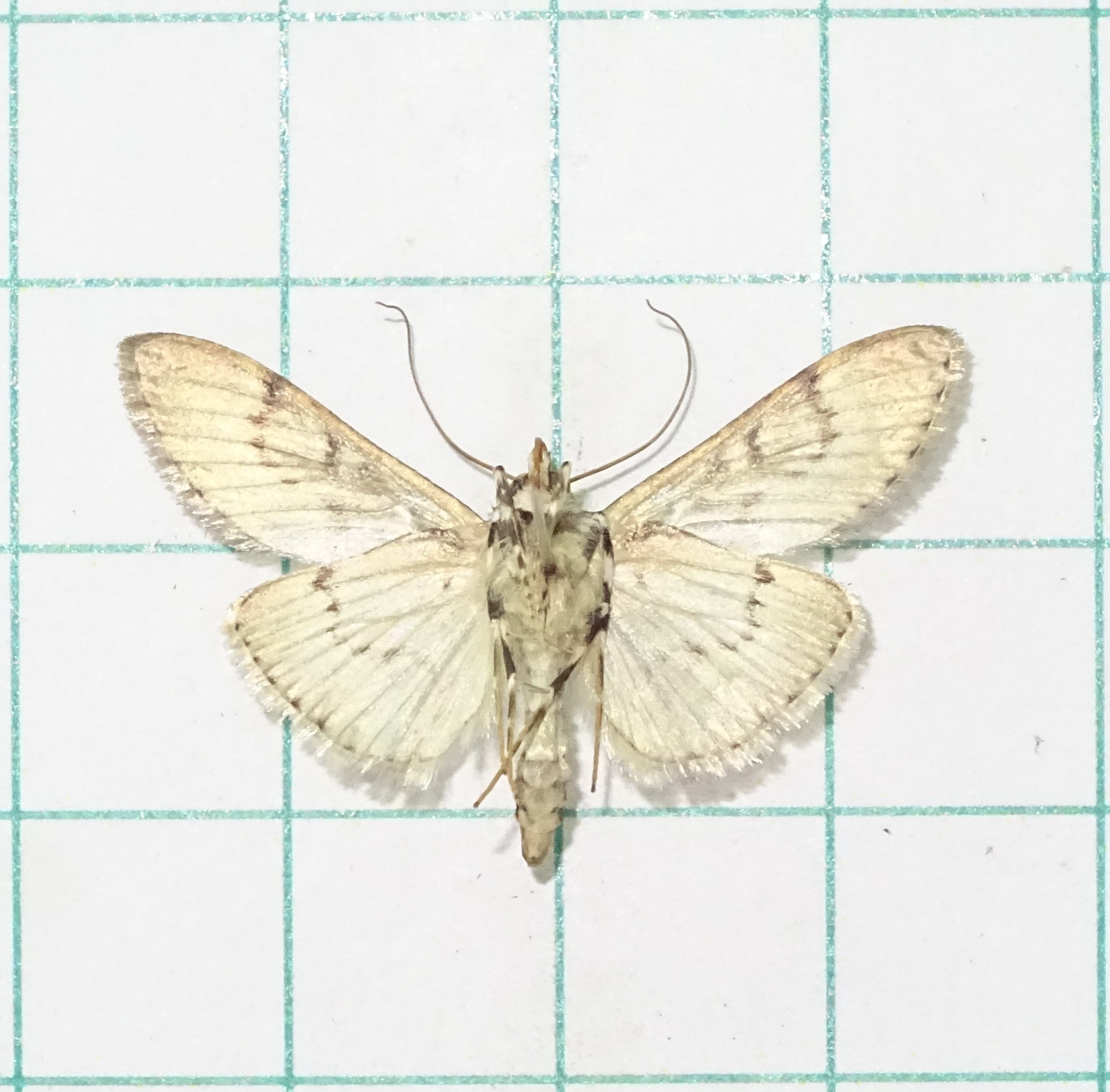

Scientific classification
- Domain: Eukaryota
- Kingdom: Animalia
- Phylum: Arthropoda
- Class: Insecta
- Order: Lepidoptera
- Family: Crambidae
- Genus: Parbattia
- Species: P. arisana

Binomial name
- Parbattia arisana Munroe & Mutuura, 1971

= Parbattia arisana =

Species of moth

Parbattia arisana is a moth in the family Crambidae. It was described by Eugene G. Munroe and Akira Mutuura in 1971. It is found in Taiwan.
