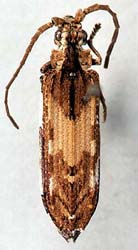
- Rhipsideigma raffrayi

Scientific classification
- Kingdom: Animalia
- Phylum: Arthropoda
- Class: Insecta
- Order: Coleoptera
- Family: Cupedidae
- Genus: Rhipsideigma; Neboiss, 1984

Species
- R. lugubris (Fairmaire, 1895); R. raffrayi (Fairmaire, 1884); R. adjuncta Neboiss, 1984; R. anosibense Neboiss, 1989; R. cretaceotincta (Kolbe, 1897)

= Rhipsideigma =

Genus of beetles

Rhipsideigma is a genus of beetles in the family Cupedidae. It contains five species, four of which ( R. lugubris (Fairmaire, 1895), R. raffrayi (Fairmaire, 1884), R. adjuncta Neboiss, 1984 and R. anosibense Neboiss, 1989) are endemic to Madagascar, the other (R. cretaceotincta (Kolbe, 1897)) being endemic to the northern coast of Tanzania. They vary in length from 13 mm to 20 mm, and are up to 6 mm wide.

In a recent phylogenetic analysis, Rhipsideigma was found to form a monophyletic group with Cupes capitatus and Tenomerga leucophaea. Because of this, some researchers have proposed synonymizing Rhipsideigma with Cupes.
