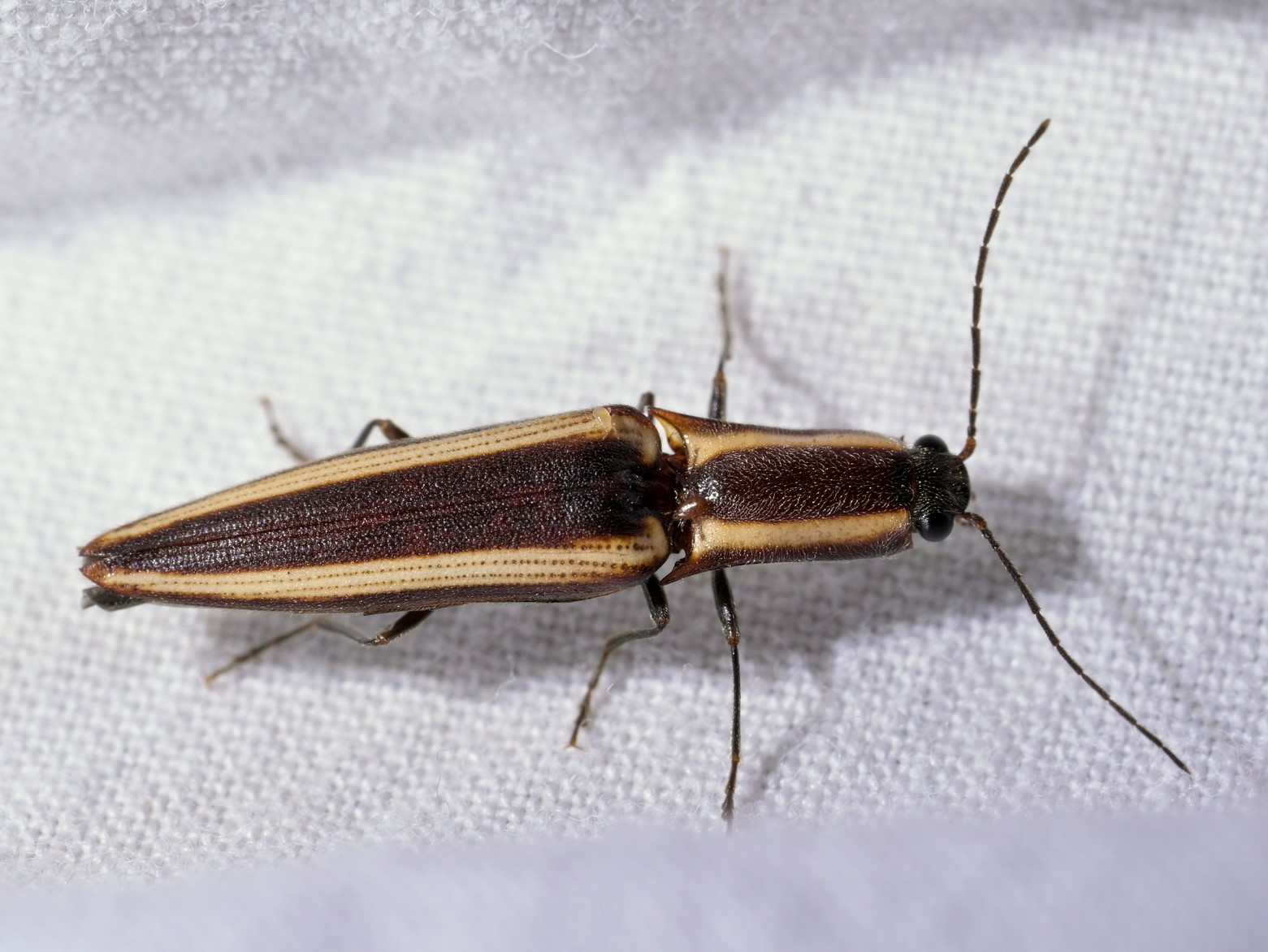
- Metablax cinctiger

Scientific classification
- Kingdom: Animalia
- Phylum: Arthropoda
- Class: Insecta
- Order: Coleoptera
- Suborder: Polyphaga
- Infraorder: Elateriformia
- Family: Elateridae
- Subfamily: Parablacinae; Kundrata, Gunter, Douglas & Bocak, 2016

= Parablacinae =

Subfamily of click beetles

Parablacinae is a subfamily of click beetles in the family Elateridae. There are about eight genera in Parablacinae.

== Genera ==
These eight genera belong to the subfamily Parablacinae:

- Metablax Candèze, 1869
- Ophidius Candèze, 1863
- Parablax Schwarz, 1906
- Parasaphes Candèze, 1882
- Sharon Arias-Bohart & Elgueta, 2015
- Tasmanelater Calder, 1996
- Wynarka Calder, 1986
- Xuthelater Calder, 1996
