= Argun terrane =

Rock formation in Transbaikalia and Mongolia

The Argun terrane is a rock unit in Transbaikalia and Mongolia, located in the Mongol-Okhotsk Fold Belt. It has been suggested that it formed part of the palaeocontinent Amuria. It is connected to the metamorphic complexes of the Siberian craton in the northern region, which is characterized by a narrow strip of mylonites. Dating using detrital zircon sourced from Proterozoic igneous and metamorphic rocks determined that the lower boundary is 549-570 million years old. Subduction-related setting is hinted by the poorly sorted and slightly rounded rock clasts and interlayered gravelites. It hosts multiple hydrothermal metal-bearing Mesozoic deposits like Wunugetushan and Jiawula. The chemical and physical conditions of Mesozoic igneous rocks with metallogenic specialization in Cis-Argun region are similar to those of the Great Kingan Belt.
