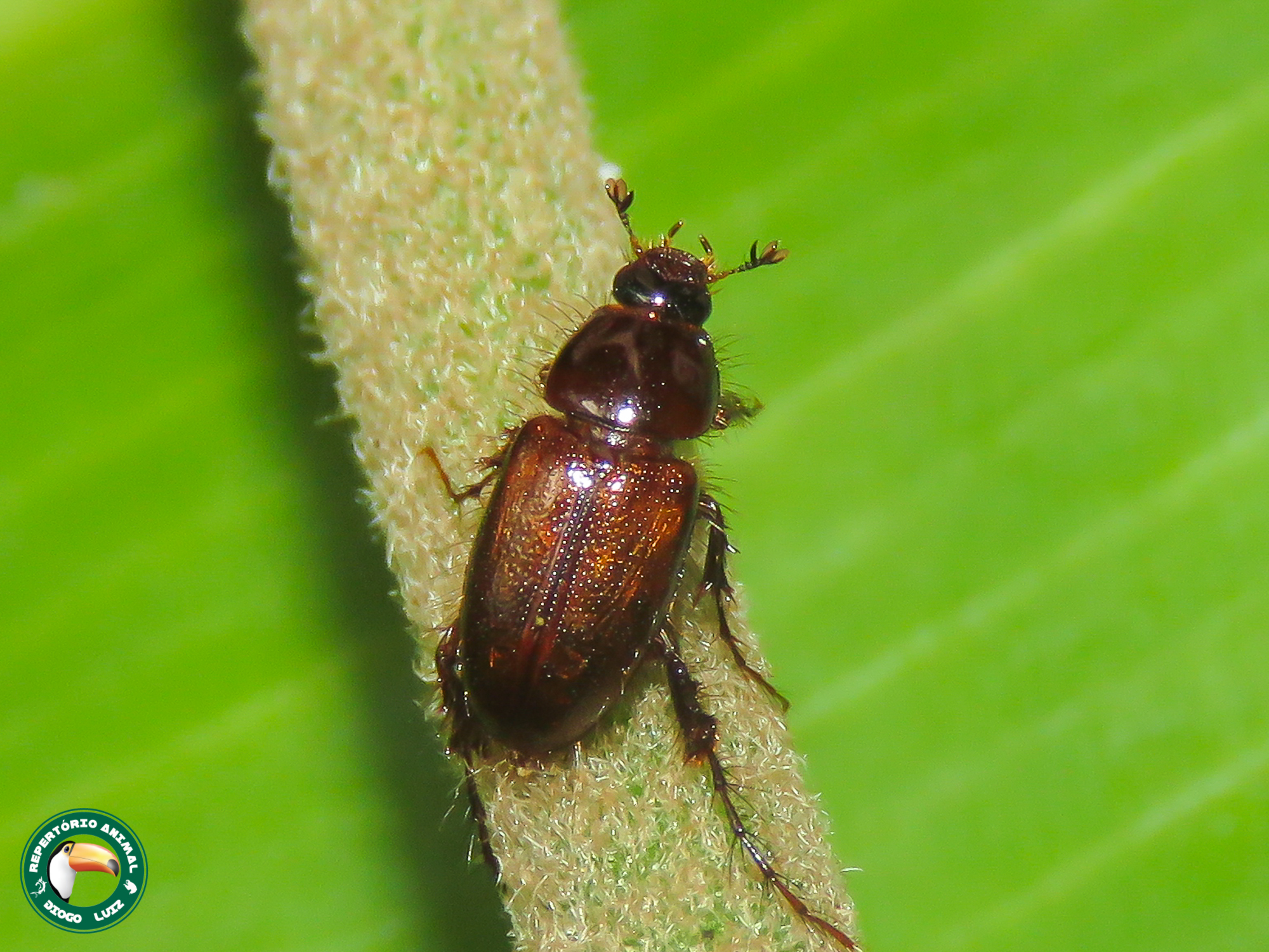
- Aclopus, Brazil

Scientific classification
- Kingdom: Animalia
- Phylum: Arthropoda
- Clade: Pancrustacea
- Class: Insecta
- Order: Coleoptera
- Suborder: Polyphaga
- Infraorder: Scarabaeiformia
- Superfamily: Scarabaeoidea
- Family: Scarabaeidae
- Subfamily: Aclopinae; Blanchard, 1850

Tribes
- Aclopini; Phaenognathini; Holocorobeini (extinct)

Synonyms
- Aclopidae Blanchard, 1850

= Aclopinae =

Subfamily of beetles

Aclopinae is a subfamily of Scarabaeidae or scarab beetles in the superfamily Scarabaeoidea.

== Distribution ==
The subfamily is found in northern Australia, Borneo and southern South America (Brazil and Argentina).

== Genera ==
These 11 genera belong to the subfamily Aclopinae.

Tribe Aclopini Blanchard, 1850
Aclopus Erichson, 1835 (Neotropics)
Desertaclopus Ocampo & Mondaca, 2012
Gracilaclopus Ocampo & Mondaca, 2012
†Cretaclopus Nikolajev, 2004
†Juraclopus Nikolajev, 2005 (Upper Jurassic)
†Prophaenognatha Bai, Ren & Yang, 2011
Tribe Holcorobeini Nikolajev, 1992 (Mesozoic)
†Antemnacrassa Gomez Pallerola, 1979
†Holcorobeus Nikritin, 1977 (Lower Cretaceous)
†Mongolrobeus Nikolajev, 2004
Tribe Phaenognathini Iablokoff-Khnozorian, 1977
Neophaenognatha Allsopp, 1983 (Neotropics)
Phaenognatha Hope, 1841 (Australia)
