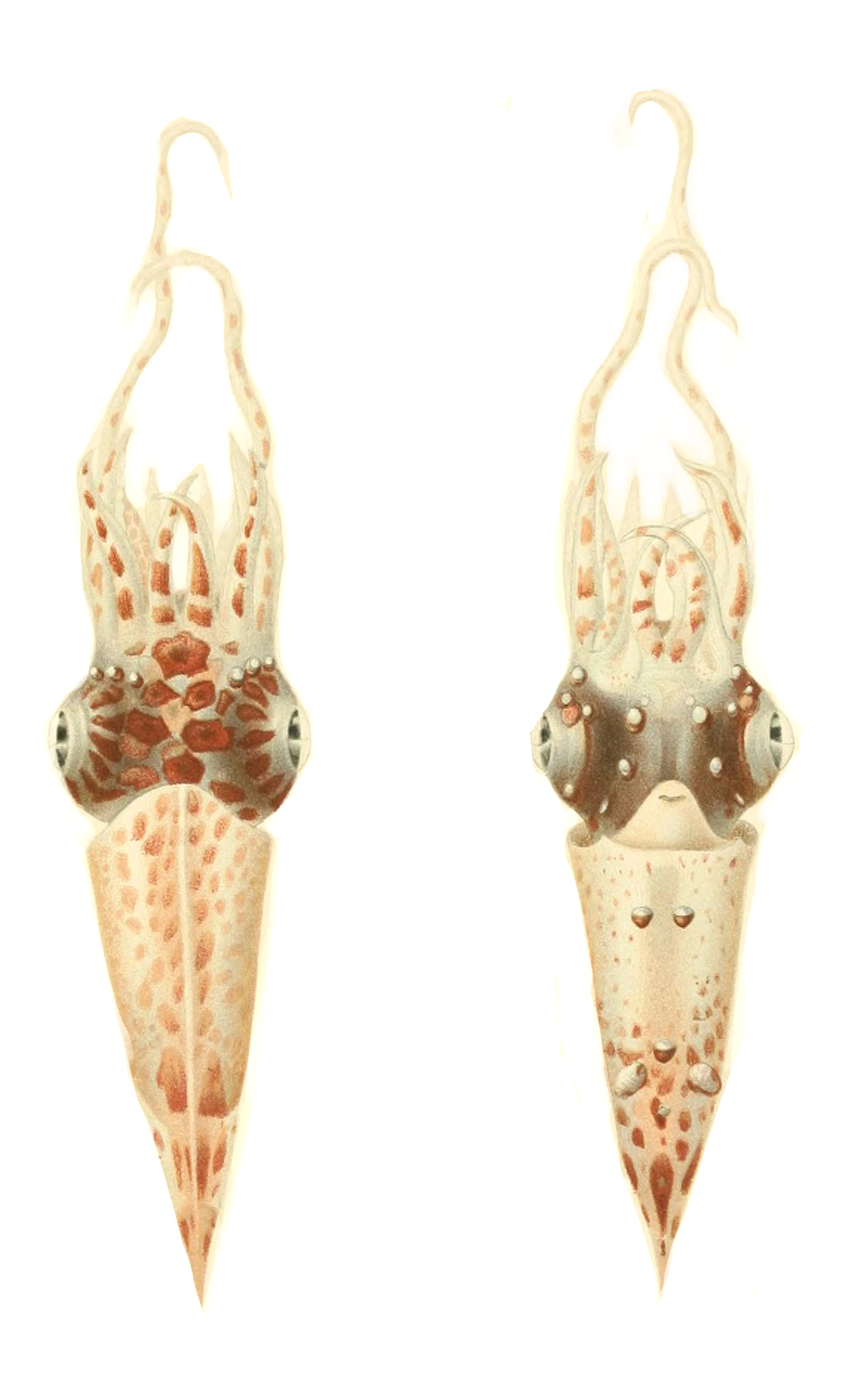

Conservation status
- Least Concern (IUCN 3.1)

Scientific classification
- Kingdom: Animalia
- Phylum: Mollusca
- Class: Cephalopoda
- Order: Oegopsida
- Family: Pyroteuthidae
- Genus: Pterygioteuthis
- Species: P. giardi

Binomial name
- Pterygioteuthis giardi Fischer, 1896

= Pterygioteuthis giardi =

Species of squid

Pterygioteuthis giardi is a species of squid in the family Pyroteuthidae. It is known as the roundear enope squid. The specific name honors the French zoologist and marine biologist Alfred Mathieu Giard (1846–1908).

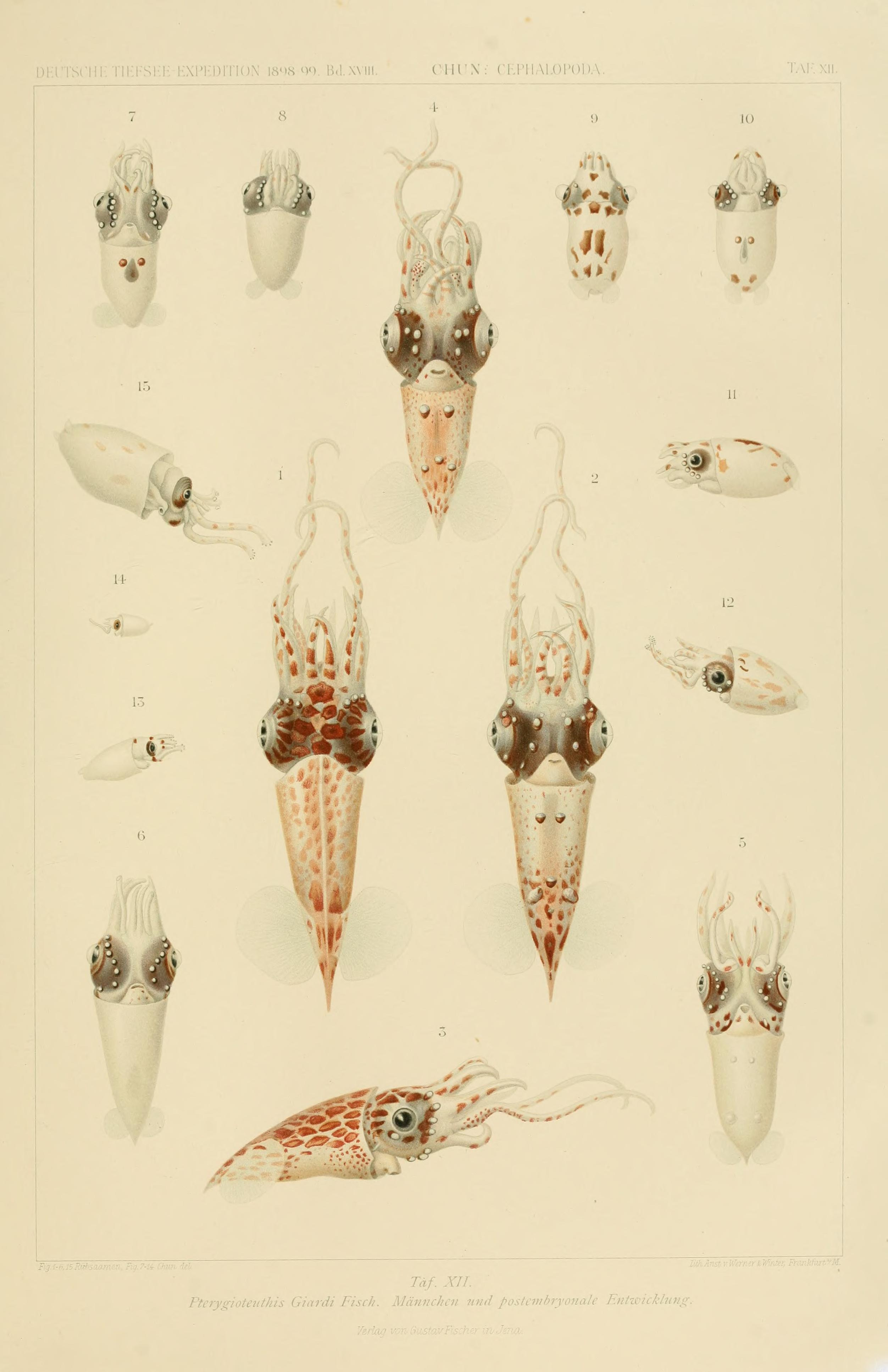
Pterygioteuthis giardi from Carl Chun's Die Cephalopoden

== Anatomy and morphology ==
Squid in the family Pyroteuthidae have Photophores (small, light-producing organs) on viscera (internal organs), stalk of tentacles, and five large and ten small photophores underneath the eyes.

The squid has a wide, triangular mantle with a rounded posterior end and rounded fins on the distal dorsal end of the mantle. Their mantles are generally less than 34 mm long.

Their tentacles look like bent clubs due to their permanent constriction. Adult squid in the Pterygioteuthis genera lack hooks on their tentacular clubs, but do have some hooks on the arms.

Male squid have a specialized arm used to transfer sperm to females called hectocotyli. Females do not have suckers on their ventral arms and only have one oviduct developed.

== Distribution and habitat ==
Squid in the Pyroteuthidae family live in the mesopelagic (midwater or twilight zone) during the day. At night, they migrate to the epipelagic waters (0-200m).

There is little knowledge about the life history of these squid due to the difficulties in studying them, but research on P. gemmata estimated its maximum age to be 78 days, and it is presumed that others in the Pyroteuthidae family have similar life-spans.

Similarly, there is little species-specific information about diet, but in a study of diets of cephalopods in the eastern Gulf of Mexico, it was found that P. giardi feed on small crustaceans such as copepods.

P. giardi inhabits the Atlantic Ocean between 40°N and 34°S and temperate regions (north and south) of the Pacific, but is not found in the eastern tropical Pacific. Off the coast of Hawaii, P. giardi was found much more abundantly on the leeward (wind-protected) side of the inner boundary zone than the windward zone. Based on data from a study conducted in Hawaii, it was proposed that P. giardi might be a facultative-boundary species, which means that it can live in the boundary between the mesopelagic and neritic (coastal) zones but does not have to in order to survive.

Predators of P. giardi vary by location but they include some large dolphins and fish. In the south Pacific, a study of the diet of the Guadalupe Fur Seal showed that it also preys on P. giardi.

== Behavior ==
In laboratory experiments, P. giardi has been observed to produce a luminescent flash when shocked with an electrode. It is likely that the squid use these flashes as a defense against predators. Organisms with photophores often also use luminescent flashes to attract prey or engage in mating rituals.

P. giardi is also able to use Counter-illumination (break up their silhouette with light from photophores) under light conditions similar to those in the upper mesopelagic zone.

== Taxonomy ==
P. giardi is a part of the P. giardi clade along with P. hoylei, which was originally classified as a subspecies of giardi, but was changed to species classification in 1987. P. giardi and P. hoylei are now recognized to be sister species.

== Conservation status ==
P. giardi is listed as a least concern species on the IUCN Red List. However, they list the need for further research into species-specific population size and dynamics, life history, ecology, and threats.
