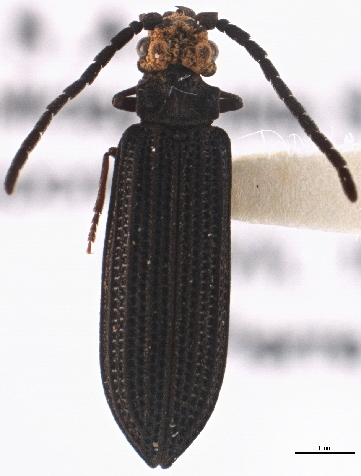

Scientific classification
- Domain: Eukaryota
- Kingdom: Animalia
- Phylum: Arthropoda
- Class: Insecta
- Order: Coleoptera
- Family: Cupedidae
- Genus: Cupes
- Species: C. capitatus

Binomial name
- Cupes capitatus Fabricius, 1801

= Cupes capitatus =

Species of insect

Cupes capitatus is a species of beetle described by Johan Christian Fabricius in 1801. It is the only living species in the genus Cupes within the family Cupedidae. It is found in North America, in the United States from Georgia to Maine and in Canada in Ontario.
