= Parathyreinae =

Parathyreinae Temporal range: Bathonian–Turonian

Scientific classification
- Kingdom: Animalia
- Phylum: Arthropoda
- Class: Insecta
- Order: Coleoptera
- Suborder: Polyphaga
- Infraorder: Elateriformia
- Family: Buprestidae
- Subfamily: †Parathyreinae; Alexeev, 1993

Subfamily of beetles

Parathyreinae is a subfamily of fossil beetles in the family Buprestidae, containing the following genera and species:

- Genus Acmaeoderimorpha Alexeev, 1993
  - Acmaeoderimorpha emersa Alexeev, 1996
  - Acmaeoderimorpha ignota Alexeev, 1993
- Genus Ancestrimorpha Alexeev, 1993
  - Ancestrimorpha volgensis Alexeev, 1993
- Genus Cretocrassisoma Alexeev, 2000
  - Cretocrassisoma indistinctum (Alexeev, 1993)
- Genus Cretoelegantella Alexeev, 2000
  - Cretoelegantella ponomarenkoi (Alexeev, 1993)
- Genus Dicercoptera Alexeev, 1993
  - Dicercoptera longipennis Alexeev, 1993
- Genus Karatausia Alexeev, 1993
  - Karatausia maculata Alexeev, 1993
- Genus Mongoligena Alexeev, 1993
  - Mongoligena curta Alexeev, 1993
  - Mongoligena popovi Alexeev, 1993
  - Mongoligena vulgata Alexeev, 1993
- Genus Mongolobuprestis Alexeev, 1993
  - Mongolobuprestis gratiosus Alexeev, 1993
- Genus Paleas Alexeev, 1993
  - Paleas maculipennis Alexeev, 1993
- Genus Paramongoligena Alexeev, 1993
  - Paramongoligena transversicollis Alexeev, 1993
- Genus Parathyrea Alexeev, 1993
  - Parathyrea jurassica Alexeev, 1993
- Genus Pseudochrysobothris Alexeev, 1993
  - Pseudochrysobothris ballae (Whalley & Jarzembowski, 1985)
- Genus Pseudomongoligena Alexeev, 2000
  - Pseudomongoligena schinkudukense Alexeev, 2000
- Genus Stigmoderimorpha Alexeev, 1993
  - Stigmoderimorpha rasnitsyni Alexeev, 1993
- Genus Umerata Alexeev, 1993
  - Umerata mirabilis Alexeev, 1993
