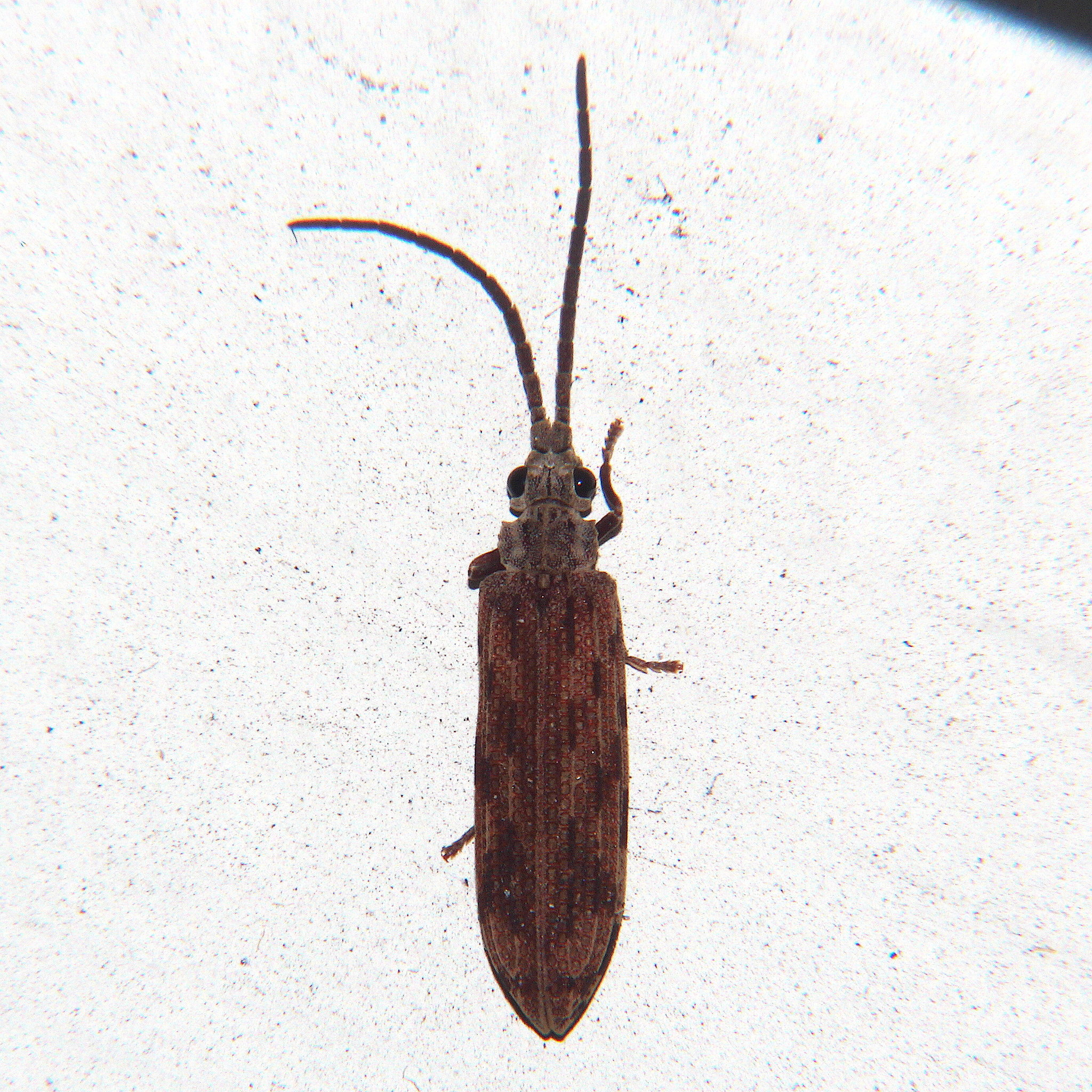
- Distocupes varians, New Zealand

Scientific classification
- Kingdom: Animalia
- Phylum: Arthropoda
- Class: Insecta
- Order: Coleoptera
- Family: Cupedidae
- Genus: Distocupes; Neboiss, 1984
- Species: D. varians

Binomial name
- Distocupes varians (Lea, 1902)

= Distocupes =

Genus of beetles

Distocupes is a monotypic genus of beetles in the family Cupedidae, the reticulated beetles. It contains the single species Distocupes varians. It is endemic to eastern Australia, including Tasmania. It is about 12 millimeters long and dark brown to black in color with a coat of lighter scales. Little is known about its biology.

Since November 2021, D. varians has been recorded from New Zealand.
