= Pyroteuthis margaritifera =

Jewel enope squid

Conservation status
- Least Concern (IUCN 3.1)

Scientific classification
- Kingdom: Animalia
- Phylum: Mollusca
- Class: Cephalopoda
- Order: Oegopsida
- Family: Pyroteuthidae
- Genus: Pyroteuthis
- Species: P. margaritifera

Binomial name
- Pyroteuthis margaritifera (Rüppell, 1844)

Synonyms
- Charibditeuthis maculata Vivanti, 1912: Enoploteuthis margaritifera Rüppell, 1844; Pyroteuthis mediterranea Pfeffer, 1912

Species of squid

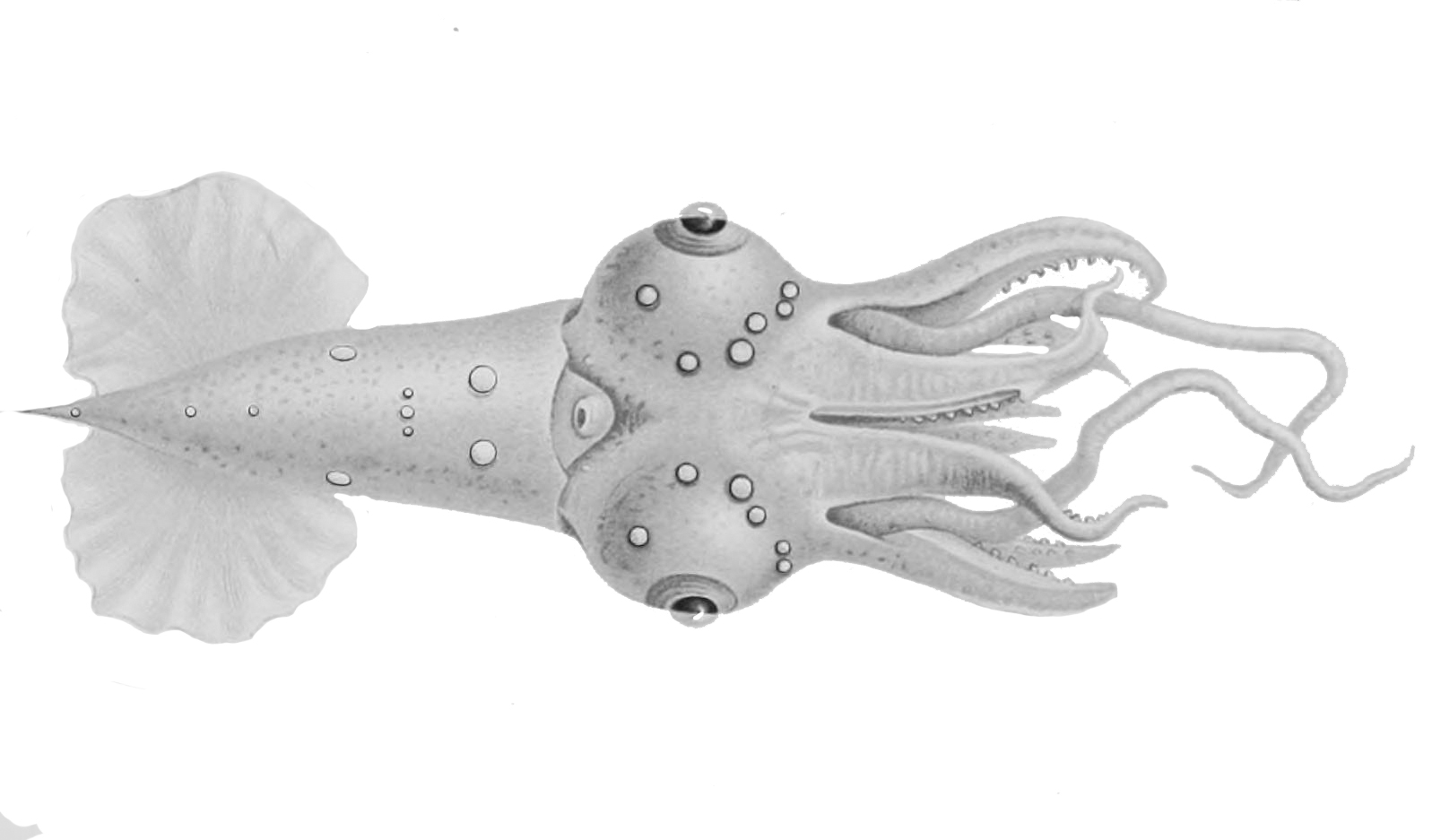
Pyroteuthis margaritifera

Pyroteuthis margaritifera, the jewel enope squid, is a species of squid in the family Pyroteuthidae.

This species has three large, ellipsoidal, double photophores on the tentacles, the nearest ellipsoidal photophore to the tip is near the carpal cluster and is widely separated from the two smaller spherical photophores at the base of the tentacle, but nearer to the other two ellipsoidal photophores. Another spherical photophore is located at the base of the tentacular club. The fourth right arm is hectocotylised and has 13-19 basal hooks, each of these hooks is large and has a primary cusp with a smooth inner edge and a large, rounded secondary cusp. Betong these basal hooks there is a fleshy, elongated pad, this is a flap in other species of Pyroteuthis, with three hooks opposite it and between zero and thirteen suckers at its tip.

P. margaritifera has been collected off Bermuda from depths of 375–500 m in the day and between 75 and 175 m during the night. It is a widely distributed species which occurs throughout the tropical and temperate Atlantic, Indian and South Pacific Oceans but has not been recorded from the eastern Pacific. It was originally described by the German naturalist Eduard Rüppell in 1844 as Enoploteuthis margaritifera from specimens taken in the Mediterranean. It shows some geographic variation.
