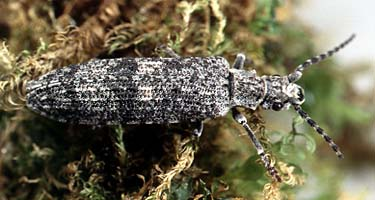

Scientific classification
- Domain: Eukaryota
- Kingdom: Animalia
- Phylum: Arthropoda
- Class: Insecta
- Order: Coleoptera
- Family: Cupedidae
- Genus: Priacma
- Species: P. serrata

Binomial name
- Priacma serrata (LeConte, 1861)

Synonyms
- Cupes serrata LeConte, 1861

= Priacma serrata =

Species of beetle

Priacma serrata is a species of reticulated beetle in the family Cupedidae. It is native to western North America. It is the only extant species in the genus Priacma. Members of the species live in coniferous forests, and are found under loose tree bark. The species is sexually dimorphic, with the rarely collected females being much larger than males. Males vary in size between 9.6 and 12.5 mm. The males of the species are noted to be strongly attracted to the odor of bleach. Dissections of adult males have consistently found empty intestines, with the digestive tract so withered in places that no food could pass through regardless. Collections suggest that adult emergence is highly episodic, with large numbers of adults emerging in sporadic events.
