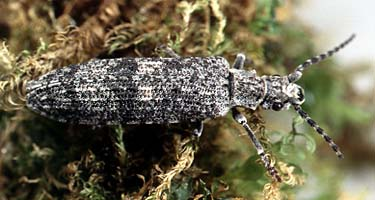
- Priacma serrata

Scientific classification
- Domain: Eukaryota
- Kingdom: Animalia
- Phylum: Arthropoda
- Class: Insecta
- Order: Coleoptera
- Family: Cupedidae
- Genus: Priacma; LeConte, 1874

Type species
- Cupes serrata LeConte, 1861

Species
- P. serrata (LeConte, 1861); †P. megapuncta Li & Cai in Li et al., 2019

= Priacma =

Priacma Temporal range: Cenomanian–Present

Genus of beetles

Priacma is a genus of beetles in the family Cupedidae. It contains a single extant species, Priacma serrata native to western North America and one fossil species, P. megapuncta from the Cenomanian aged Burmese amber. Species previously assigned to the genus from the Yixian Formation of China have been subsequently placed in the separate genus Apriacma.
