= Metabuprestium =

Scientific classification
- Kingdom: Animalia
- Phylum: Arthropoda
- Class: Insecta
- Order: Coleoptera
- Suborder: Polyphaga
- Infraorder: Elateriformia
- Family: Buprestidae
- Genus: Metabuprestium; Alexeev, 1995

Genus of beetles

Metabuprestium is a fossil genus of beetles in the family Buprestidae, containing the following species:

- Metabuprestium arkharense Alexeev, 1996
- Metabuprestium bayssense Alexeev, 1995
- Metabuprestium bontsaganense Alexeev, 1995
- Metabuprestium cretaceum Alexeev, 1995
- Metabuprestium cuneomaculatum Alexeev, 1996
- Metabuprestium dundulense Alexeev, 1995
- Metabuprestium furcatorugosum Alexeev, 1996
- Metabuprestium granulipenne Alexeev, 1995
- Metabuprestium latipenne Alexeev, 1996
- Metabuprestium minutum Alexeev, 1995
- Metabuprestium nobile Alexeev, 1995
- Metabuprestium ovale Alexeev, 1995
- Metabuprestium oyunchaiense Alexeev, 2000
- Metabuprestium shartologoiense Alexeev, 1995
- Metabuprestium ustkivdense Alexeev, 2008
- Metabuprestium vitimense Alexeev, 1996
