= Cretothyrea =

Cretothyrea optanda

Scientific classification
- Kingdom: Animalia
- Phylum: Arthropoda
- Class: Insecta
- Order: Coleoptera
- Suborder: Polyphaga
- Infraorder: Elateriformia
- Family: Buprestidae
- Genus: †Cretothyrea; Alexeev, 1996
- Species: †C. optanda

Binomial name
- †Cretothyrea optanda Alexeev, 1996

Genus of beetles

Cretothyrea optanda is a fossil species of beetle in the family Buprestidae, the only species in the genus Cretothyrea.
