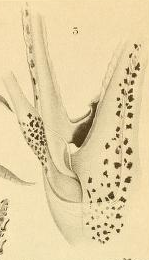
- Pterygioteuthis gemmata, female. Attachment of ventral arms and tentacle, left side. The thin, long muscle of attachment of the tentacle passes below the deep attachment of the 3rd arm to the base of the tentacle. Porus aquiferus present between chocolate-brown buccal funnel and deep attachment.

Conservation status
- Least Concern (IUCN 3.1)

Scientific classification
- Kingdom: Animalia
- Phylum: Mollusca
- Class: Cephalopoda
- Order: Oegopsida
- Family: Pyroteuthidae
- Genus: Pterygioteuthis
- Species: P. gemmata

Binomial name
- Pterygioteuthis gemmata Chun, 1908

= Pterygioteuthis gemmata =

Species of squid

Pterygioteuthis gemmata is a species of squid in the family Pyroteuthidae.
