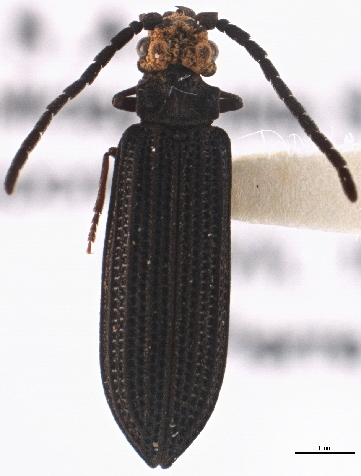
- Cupes capitatus

Scientific classification
- Domain: Eukaryota
- Kingdom: Animalia
- Phylum: Arthropoda
- Class: Insecta
- Order: Coleoptera
- Family: Cupedidae
- Genus: Cupes; Fabricius, 1801

Species
- See text

Synonyms
- Cupoides Motschulsky, 1856

= Cupes =

Cupes Temporal range: Thanetian - Recent

Genus of beetles

Cupes is a genus of beetles in the family Cupedidae. The Cupedidae are typical “reticulate” or “net-winged” beetles with incompletely sclerotized elytra that produce the characteristic reticulate appearance.

Cupes contains a single living species Cupes capitatus and a number of extinct species described from fossils dating from the Pliocene to the Paleocene. C. capitatus is native to eastern North America, while the fossils are described from China and Europe. C. capitatus adults are 7.8 mm (0.31 in) long on average with red to gray-brown body color and a bright orange head that is molded into several knobby protuberances.

== Species ==
- Cupes capitatus Fabricius, 1801 (extant eastern North America)
- †Cupes distinctissimus Kirejtshuk et al., 2016 (Thanetian, Menat Formation France)
- †Cupes eckfeldensis (Tröster, 1993) (Eocene, Eckfelder Maar, Germany)
- †Cupes golovatchi Kirejtshuk, 2020 (Eocene, Eckfelder Maar, Germany)
- †Cupes groehni Kirejtshuk, 2005 (Priabonian, Baltic amber)
- †Cupes hoffeinsorum Kirejtshuk, 2005 (Priabonian, Baltic amber)
- †Cupes kerneggeri Kirejtshuk, 2005 (Priabonian, Baltic amber)
- †Cupes komissari Kirejtshuk, 2005 (Priabonian, Baltic amber)
- †Cupes legalovi Kirejtshuk, 2020 (Eocene, Eckfelder Maar, Germany)
- †Cupes longus Hong & Wang, 1987 (Burdigalian, Shangwan Formation, China)
- †Cupes lutzi Kirejtshuk, 2020 (Eocene, Eckfelder Maar, Germany)
- †Cupes manifestus Kirejtshuk et al., 2010 (Thanetian, Menat Formation, France)
- †Cupes messelensis (Tröster, 1993) (Lutetian, Messel pit, Germany)
- †Cupes nabozhenkoi Kirejtshuk, 2020 (Lutetian, Messel pit, Germany)
- †Cupes ponomarenkoi Kirejtshuk et al., 2010 (Ypresian, Oise amber, France)
- †Cupes praeglacialis Gersdorf, 1976 (Piacenzian, Germany)
- †Cupes rohdendorfi Yablokov-Khnzorian, 1960 (Priabonian, Baltic amber)
- †Cupes simillimus Kirejtshuk et al., 2016 (Thanetian, France)
- †Cupes tessellatus Motschulsky, 1856 (Priabonian, Baltic amber)
- †Cupes wedmannae Kirejtshuk, 2020 (Lutetian, Messel pit, Germany)
- †Cupes weitschati Kirejtshuk, 2005 (Priabonian, Baltic amber)
