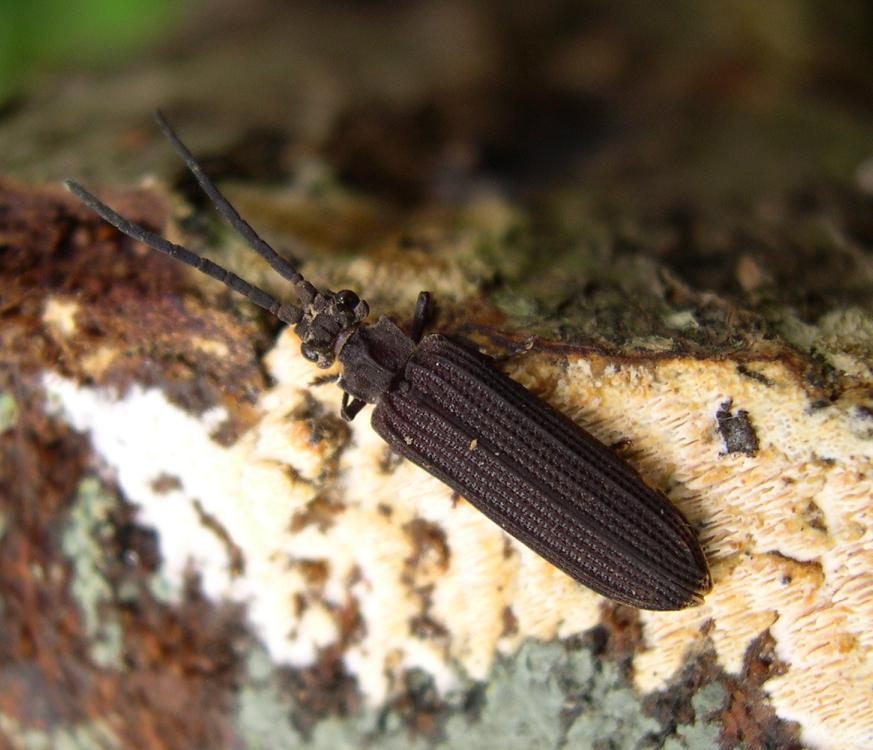
- Tenomerga mucida

Scientific classification
- Kingdom: Animalia
- Phylum: Arthropoda
- Clade: Pancrustacea
- Class: Insecta
- Order: Coleoptera
- Suborder: Archostemata
- Family: Cupedidae; Laporte, 1836

Genera
- Adinolepis; Ascioplaga; Cupes; Distocupes; Paracupes; Priacma; Prolixocupes; Rhipsideigma; Tenomerga

= Cupedidae =

Cupedidae Temporal range: Late Triassic–Recent

Family of beetles

The Cupedidae are a small family of beetles, notable for the square pattern of "windows" on their elytra (hard forewings), which give the family their common name of reticulated beetles.

== Familial makeup ==
The family consists of about 30 species in 9 genera; they are present in Asia, Oceania and the Americas but are notably absent from Europe (even if European fossils are known). Many more extinct species are known, dating as far back as the Triassic. The family Ommatidae is considered a subfamily of Cupedidae by some authors, but ommatids have been found to more closely related to Micromalthidae in genomic analysis studies.

== Appearance ==
These beetles tend to be elongated with a parallel-sided body, ranging in length from 10 to 20 mm (0.39 to 0.79 in), with colors brownish, blackish, or gray. The larvae are wood-borers, typically living in fungus-infested wood, and sometimes found in wood construction. The larvae eat the fungus-infested dead wood or tree roots while the adults are believed to subsist on pollen and plant sap.

Males of Priacma serrata (western North America) are notable for being strongly attracted to common household bleach. This suggests that compounds in bleach may resemble attractive compounds found by the beetle in nature.

== Taxonomy ==
- Adinolepis Neboiss, 1984 – Australia
- Ascioplaga Neboiss, 1984 – New Caledonia, Australia
- Cupes Fabricius, 1801 – Europe, China, Paleogene; North America, Recent
- Distocupes Neboiss, 1984 – Australia
- Paracupes Kolbe, 1898 – South America
- Priacma LeConte, 1874 – Myanmar, Cretaceous; North America, Recent
- Prolixocupes Neboiss, 1960 – North America, South America
- Rhipsideigma Neboiss, 1984 – Madagascar, East Africa
- Tenomerga Neboiss, 1984 – East and Southeast Asia, New Guinea, North America, South Africa

=== Fossil genera ===
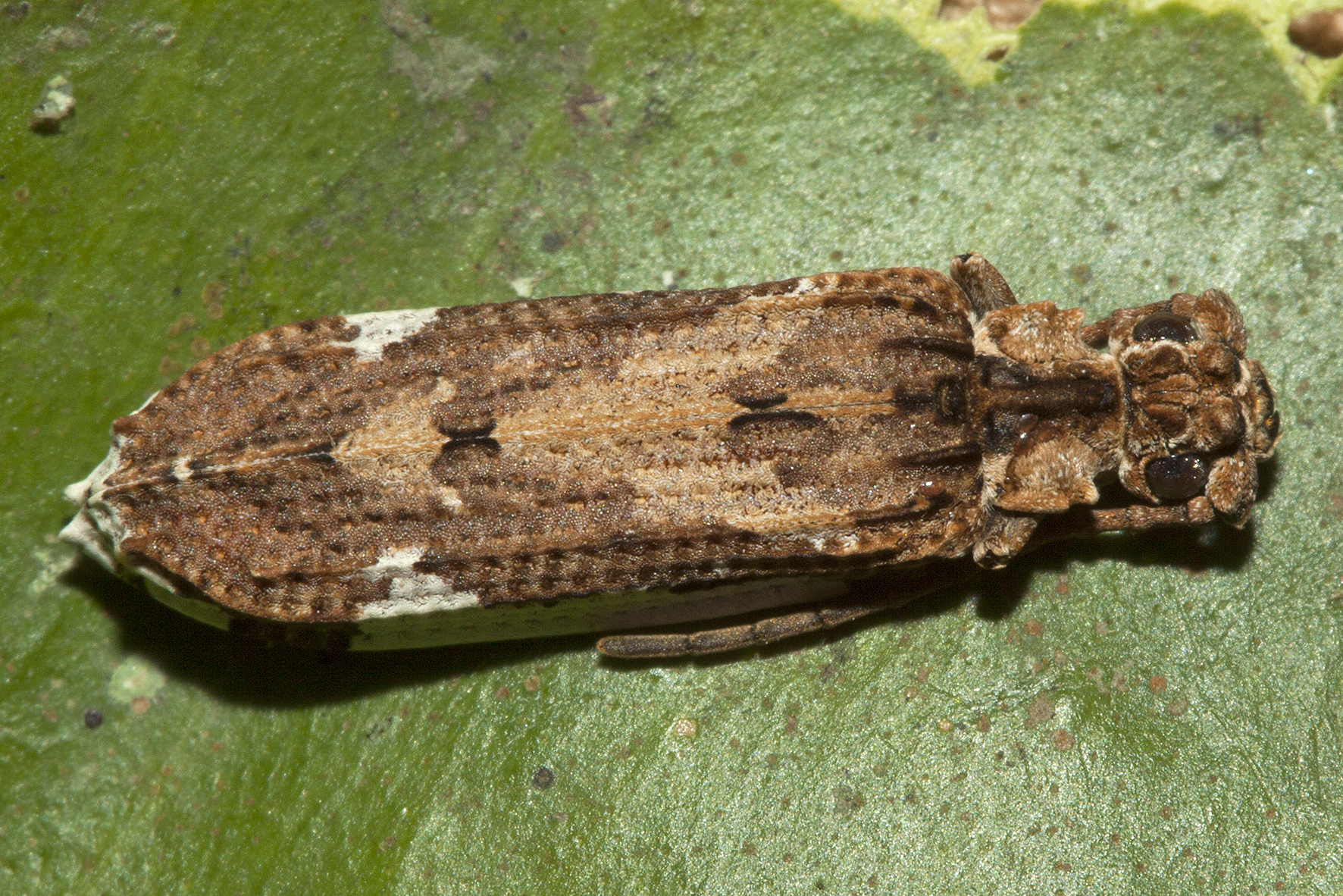
Rhipsideigma raffrayi

After Kirejtshuk, Nel and Kirejtshuk (2016).

- †Anaglyphites Ponomarenko, 1964 – Karabastau Formation, Kazakhstan, Late Jurassic (Oxfordian/Kimmeridgian), Shar-Teg, Mongolia, Late Jurassic (Tithonian), Hengshan Formation, China, Dzun-Bain Formation, Mongolia, Zaza Formation, Russia, Early Cretaceous (Aptian)
- †"Anaglyphites" pluricavus Soriano and Delclos, 2006 – La Pedrera de Rúbies Formation, Spain, Early Cretaceous (Barremian)
- †Apriacma Kirejtshuk et al., 2016 – Yixian Formation, China, Aptian
- †Asimma Ponomarenko, 1966 – Madygen Formation, Kyrgyzstan, Late Triassic
- †Barbaticupes Jarzembowski et al., 2017 – Burmese amber, Myanmar, Late Cretaceous (Cenomanian)
- †Cainomerga Kirejtshuk et al., 2016 – Menat Formation, France, Paleocene
- †Cretomerga Kirejtshuk et al., 2016 – Yixian Formation, China, Aptian
- †Cupopsis Kirejtshuk et al., 2016 – New Jersey amber, Late Cretaceous (Turonian)
- †Cupidium Ponomarenko, 1968 – Karabastau Formation, Kazakhstan, Oxfordian/Kimmeridgian
- †Ensicupes Hong, 1976 – Dalazi Formation, Guyang Formation, China, Aptian
- †Furcicupes Tan and Ren, 2006 – Yixian Formation, China, Aptian
- †Gracilicupes Tan et al., 2006 – Daohugou, China, Middle Jurassic (Callovian)
- †Kirghizocupes Ponomarenko, 1966 – Madygen Formation, Kyrgyzstan, Late Triassic
- †Latocupes Ren and Tan, 2006 – Yixian Formation, China, Aptian
- †Mallecupes Jarzembowski et al., 2017 – Burmese amber, Myanmar, Cenomanian
- †Menatops Kirejtshuk et al., 2016 – Menat Formation, France, Paleocene
- †Mesocupes Martynov, 1926 – Karabastau Formation, Kazakhstan, Oxfordian, Las Hoyas, Spain, Barremian
- †Miocupes Ponomarenko, 1973 – Cypris Formation, Czech Republic, Miocene
- †"Platycupes" sogdianus Ponomarenko, 1966 – Madygen Formation, Kyrgyzstan, Late Triassic
- †"Priacma" sanzii Soriano and Delclos, 2006 – Las Hoyas, Spain, Barremian
- †Priacmopsis Ponomarenko, 1966 – Zaza Formation, Russia, Aptian
- †Pterocupes Ponomarenko, 1966 – Madygen Formation, Kyrgyzstan, Late Triassic
- †Rotunthorax Gui et al., 2026 – Tanzhuang Formation, China, Middle-Late Triassic
- †Taxopsis Kirejtshuk et al., 2016 – Baltic amber, Eocene

Notocupes, traditionally considered a member of Ommatidae, has been suggested to be more closely related to Cupedidae via cladistic analysis.
