= Mectemycor =

Scientific classification
- Domain: Eukaryota
- Kingdom: Animalia
- Phylum: Arthropoda
- Class: Insecta
- Order: Coleoptera
- Suborder: Polyphaga
- Infraorder: Cucujiformia
- Superfamily: Cleroidea
- Family: Mauroniscidae
- Genus: Mectemycor; Majer, 1995

Genus of beetles

Mectemycor is a genus of beetles in the family Mauroniscidae, historically included in the family Melyridae. The three known species of this genus are found in western North America, and all are endemic to California.

== Species ==
- Mectemycor linearis (Fall, 1910)
- Mectemycor sericeus Majer, 1995
- Mectemycor strangulatus Majer, 1995
