= Amecomycter =

Scientific classification
- Kingdom: Animalia
- Phylum: Arthropoda
- Class: Insecta
- Order: Coleoptera
- Suborder: Polyphaga
- Infraorder: Cucujiformia
- Superfamily: Cleroidea
- Family: Mauroniscidae
- Genus: Amecomycter; Majer, 1995

Genus of beetles

Amecomycter is a genus of beetles in the family Mauroniscidae, historically included in the family Melyridae. The six known species of this genus are found in South America in the countries of Argentina, Chile, and Peru.

== Species ==
- Amecomycter argentinus (Pic, 1928)
- Amecomycter bicoloripennis (Pic, 1928)
- Amecomycter crassus Majer, 1995
- Amecomycter pallidicolor (Pic, 1910)
- Amecomycter rugicollis Majer, 1995
- Amecomycter vitticollis Majer, 1995
