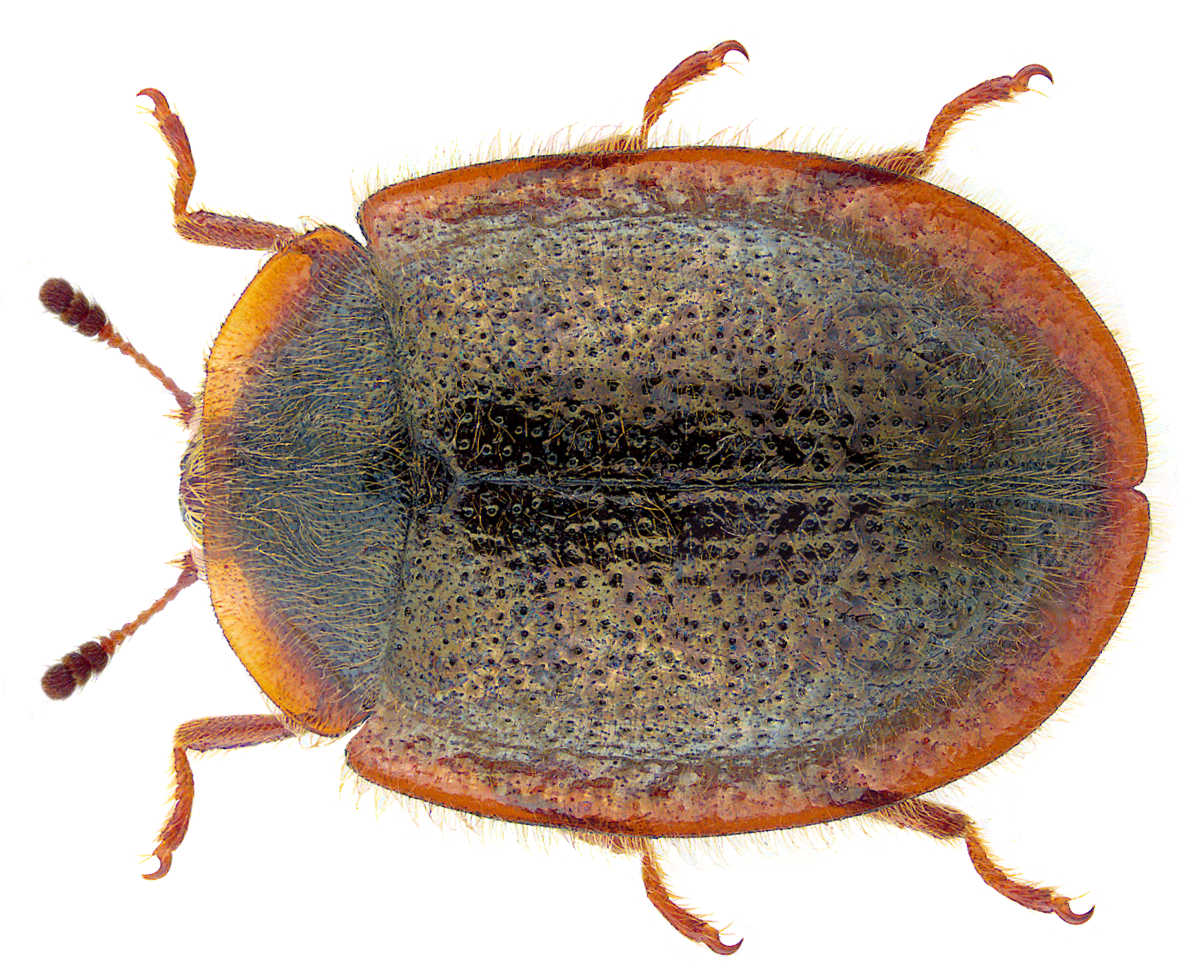
- Thymalus limbatus 5.0 to 7.0 mm.

Scientific classification
- Domain: Eukaryota
- Kingdom: Animalia
- Phylum: Arthropoda
- Class: Insecta
- Order: Coleoptera
- Suborder: Polyphaga
- Infraorder: Cucujiformia
- Family: Thymalidae
- Genus: Thymalus
- Species: T. limbatus

Binomial name
- Thymalus limbatus (Fabricius, 1787)

= Thymalus limbatus =

Species of beetle

Thymalus limbatus is a species of beetle in family Thymalidae. It is found in the palearctic. It is an obligate Saproxylic species associated with Betula pendula, Fagus sylvatica, Fagus sylvatica, Tilia × europaea and Picea abies mostly under bark. It feeds on fungus or dead wood.

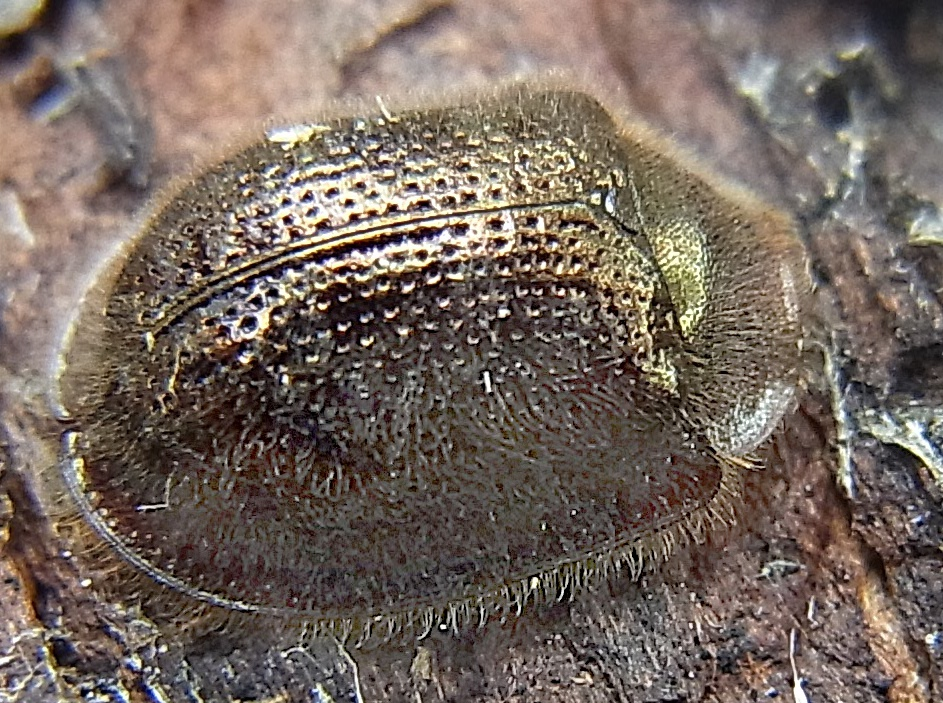
Recto

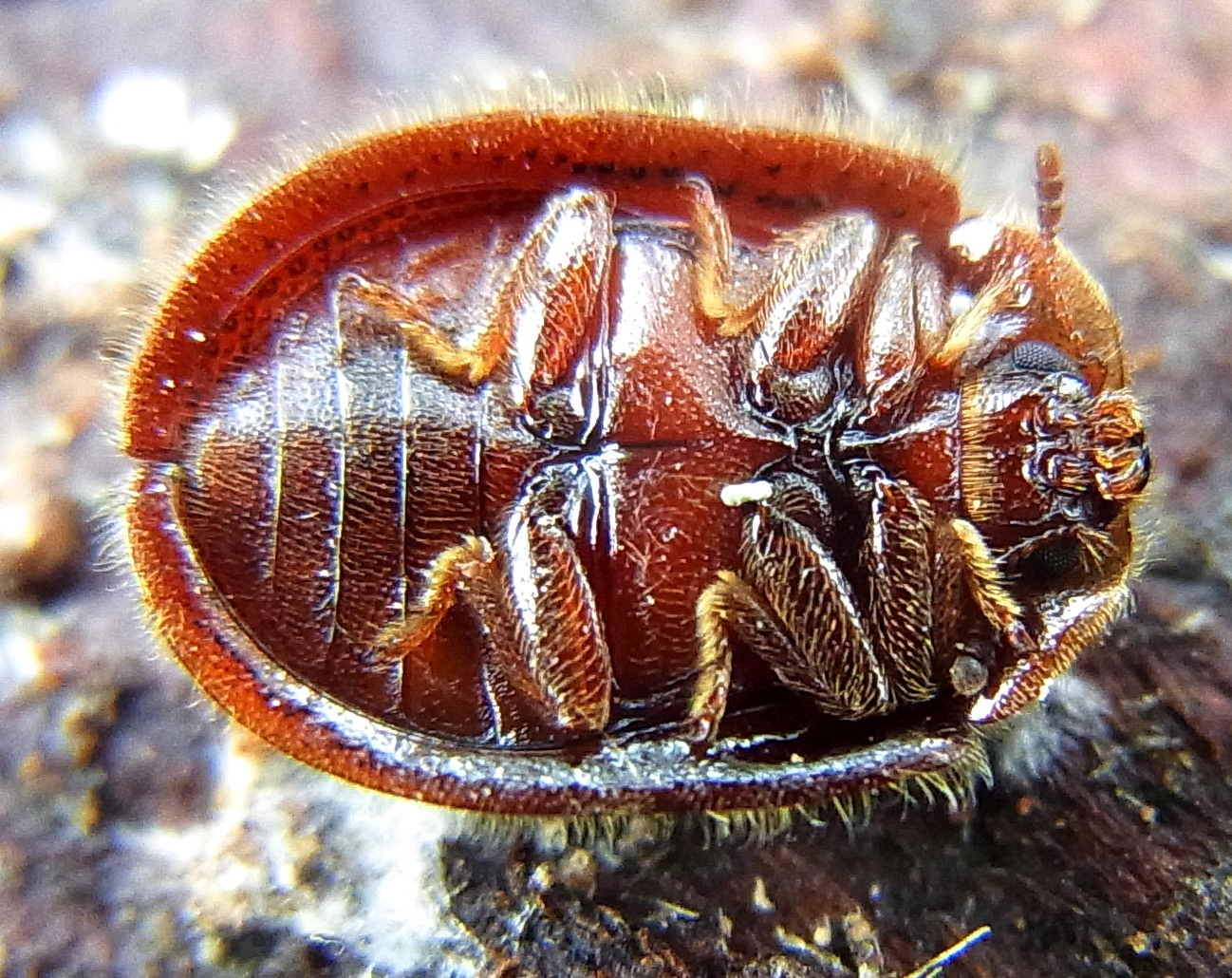
Verso
