= Scuromanius =

Scientific classification
- Domain: Eukaryota
- Kingdom: Animalia
- Phylum: Arthropoda
- Class: Insecta
- Order: Coleoptera
- Suborder: Polyphaga
- Infraorder: Cucujiformia
- Superfamily: Cleroidea
- Family: Mauroniscidae
- Genus: Scuromanius; Majer, 1995

Genus of beetles

Scuromanius is a genus of beetles in the family Mauroniscidae, historically included in the family Melyridae. The six known species of this genus are found in South America from Argentina north to Texas and California in North America.

== Species ==
- Scuromanius anemonia Majer, 1995
- Scuromanius facetus (Casey, 1895)
- Scuromanius ferrugineus Majer, 1995
- Scuromanius liebecki (Blaisdell, 1929)
- Scuromanius testaceipes (Champion, 1914)
- Scuromanius wickhami Majer, 1995
