= Dasyrhadus =

Scientific classification
- Domain: Eukaryota
- Kingdom: Animalia
- Phylum: Arthropoda
- Class: Insecta
- Order: Coleoptera
- Suborder: Polyphaga
- Infraorder: Cucujiformia
- Superfamily: Cleroidea
- Family: Mauroniscidae
- Genus: Dasyrhadus; Fall, 1910

Genus of beetles

Dasyrhadus is a genus of beetles in the family Mauroniscidae, historically included in the family Melyridae. The two known species of this genus are found in western North America.

== Species ==
- Dasyrhadus impressicollis Fall, 1910
- Dasyrhadus longior Fall, 1910
