= Mecomycter =

Scientific classification
- Domain: Eukaryota
- Kingdom: Animalia
- Phylum: Arthropoda
- Class: Insecta
- Order: Coleoptera
- Suborder: Polyphaga
- Infraorder: Cucujiformia
- Superfamily: Cleroidea
- Family: Mauroniscidae
- Genus: Mecomycter; Horn, 1882

Genus of beetles

Mecomycter is a genus of beetles in the family Mauroniscidae, historically included in the family Melyridae. The three known species of this genus are found in North America from Kansas west to California.

== Species ==
- Mecomycter majeri Howell, 1997
- Mecomycter omalinus Horn, 1882
- Mecomycter testaceus Majer, 1995
