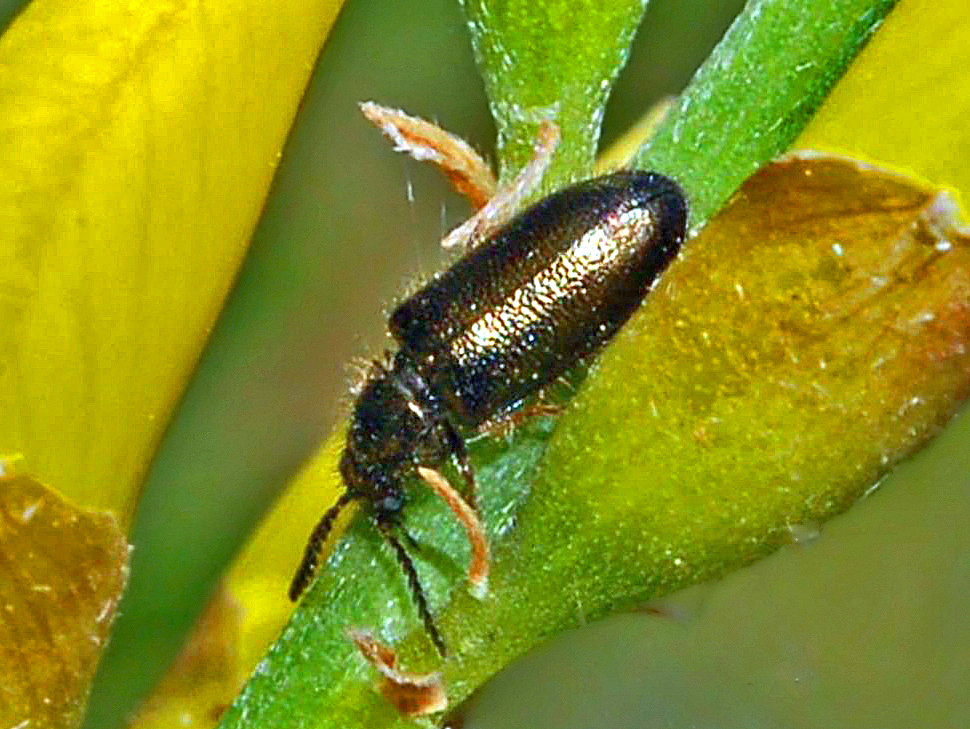

Scientific classification
- Domain: Eukaryota
- Kingdom: Animalia
- Phylum: Arthropoda
- Class: Insecta
- Order: Coleoptera
- Suborder: Polyphaga
- Infraorder: Cucujiformia
- Superfamily: Cleroidea
- Family: Rhadalidae
- Genus: Aplocnemus; Stephens, 1830

Synonyms
- Elicopis Stephens, 1829 (Unav.); Haplocnemus Agassiz, 1846 (Emend.); Helicopis Agassiz, 1846 (Emend.); Pseudaphyctus Pic, 1896

= Aplocnemus =

Genus of beetles

Aplocnemus is an uncommon genus of beetles native to Europe and the British isles belonging to the family Rhadalidae, and formerly in the Melyridae.

== Species ==
- Aplocnemus abietum Kiesenwetter, 1859
- Aplocnemus acutangulus Schilsky, 1897
- Aplocnemus akbesianus Pic, 1896
- Aplocnemus albipilis Kiesenwetter, 1863
- Aplocnemus alpestris Kiesenwetter, 1861
- Aplocnemus andalusicus (Rosenhauer, 1856)
- Aplocnemus angelinii Liberti, 1995
- Aplocnemus atricornis Pic, 1921
- Aplocnemus aubei Kiesenwetter, 1867
- Aplocnemus barnevillei Kiesenwetter, 1867
- Aplocnemus basalis (Küster, 1849)
- Aplocnemus brevis (Rosenhauer, 1856)
- Aplocnemus brevissimus Pic, 1908
- Aplocnemus caelatus (Brullé, 1832)
- Aplocnemus calidus Mulsant & Rey, 1868
- Aplocnemus castiliensis Schilsky, 1897
- Aplocnemus chalconatus (Germar, 1817)
- Aplocnemus cobosi Pic, 1954
- Aplocnemus coeruleatus (Rosenhauer, 1856)
- Aplocnemus consobrinus (Rosenhauer, 1856)
- Aplocnemus corcyricus Miller, 1866
- Aplocnemus crenicollis (Kiesenwetter, 1863)
- Aplocnemus cribrarius (Brullé, 1832)
- Aplocnemus cribricollis Mulsant & Rey, 1868
- Aplocnemus cribripennis Pic, 1921
- Aplocnemus croceicornis Kiesenwetter, 1863
- Aplocnemus cylindricus Kiesenwetter, 1863
- Aplocnemus difficilis Holdhaus, 1923
- Aplocnemus duplicatus Kiesenwetter, 1871
- Aplocnemus escalerai Pic, 1908
- Aplocnemus gracilicornis Schilsky, 1897
- Aplocnemus grancanariensis Lindberg, 1953
- Aplocnemus hispanicus Pic, 1954
- Aplocnemus impressus (Marsham, 1802)
- Aplocnemus integer Baudi di Selve, 1873
- Aplocnemus jejunus Kiesenwetter, 1863
- Aplocnemus kaszabi Majer, 1982
- Aplocnemus kiesenwetteri Schilsky, 1897
- Aplocnemus korbi Schilsky, 1897
- Aplocnemus koziorowiczi Desbrochers, 1871
- Aplocnemus latior Pic, 1908
- Aplocnemus limbipennis Kiesenwetter, 1865
- Aplocnemus macedonicus Pic, 1922
- Aplocnemus montivagus (Rosenhauer, 1856)
- Aplocnemus nevadensis Pic, 1908
- Aplocnemus nigricornis (Fabricius, 1792)
- Aplocnemus pectinatus (Küster, 1850)
- Aplocnemus pellucens Kiesenwetter, 1865
- Aplocnemus pertusus Kiesenwetter, 1859
- Aplocnemus ponferradanus Pic, 1913
- Aplocnemus pristocerus Kiesenwetter, 1859
- Aplocnemus pulverulentus (Küster, 1850)
- Aplocnemus quercicola Mulsant & Rey, 1868
- Aplocnemus ramicornis Kiesenwetter, 1863
- Aplocnemus raymondi Deville, 1908
- Aplocnemus rufipes Miller, 1862
- Aplocnemus rufomarginatus Perris, 1869
- Aplocnemus rugulosus (Rosenhauer, 1856)
- Aplocnemus sahlbergi Mayor, 2007
- Aplocnemus sculpturatus Wollaston, 1862
- Aplocnemus serbicus Kiesenwetter, 1863
- Aplocnemus serratus (Brullé, 1832)
- Aplocnemus serrulatus Schilsky, 1906
- Aplocnemus strandi Marcu, 1936
- Aplocnemus subcostatus Schilsky, 1894
- Aplocnemus syriacus Schilsky, 1894
- Aplocnemus tarsalis (C.R. Sahlberg, 1822)
- Aplocnemus thessalicus Pic, 1908
- Aplocnemus trinacriensis Ragusa, 1872
- Aplocnemus tuberculifer (Motschulsky, 1850)
- Aplocnemus tumidus Kiesenwetter, 1863
- Aplocnemus uhagoni Schilsky, 1897
- Aplocnemus vestitus Wollaston, 1862
- Aplocnemus virens (Suffrian, 1843)
