= Mauroniscus =

Scientific classification
- Domain: Eukaryota
- Kingdom: Animalia
- Phylum: Arthropoda
- Class: Insecta
- Order: Coleoptera
- Suborder: Polyphaga
- Infraorder: Cucujiformia
- Superfamily: Cleroidea
- Family: Mauroniscidae
- Genus: Mauroniscus; Bourgeois, 1911

Genus of beetles

Mauroniscus is a genus of beetles in the family Mauroniscidae, historically included in the family Melyridae. The ten known species of this genus are found in South America in the countries of Argentina, Bolivia, Chile, Columbia, Ecuador, and Peru.

== Species ==
- Mauroniscus apicalis (Pic, 1910)
- Mauroniscus boliviensis Majer, 1995
- Mauroniscus chiliensis Estrada & Solervicens, 2021
- Mauroniscus discipennis (Pic, 1910)
- Mauroniscus germaini Majer, 1995
- Mauroniscus maculatus (Pic, 1927)
- Mauroniscus roberti Bourgeois, 1911
- Mauroniscus subfasciatus (Pic, 1910)
- Mauroniscus titschaki (Pic, 1954)
- Mauroniscus wayrauchi Majer, 1995
