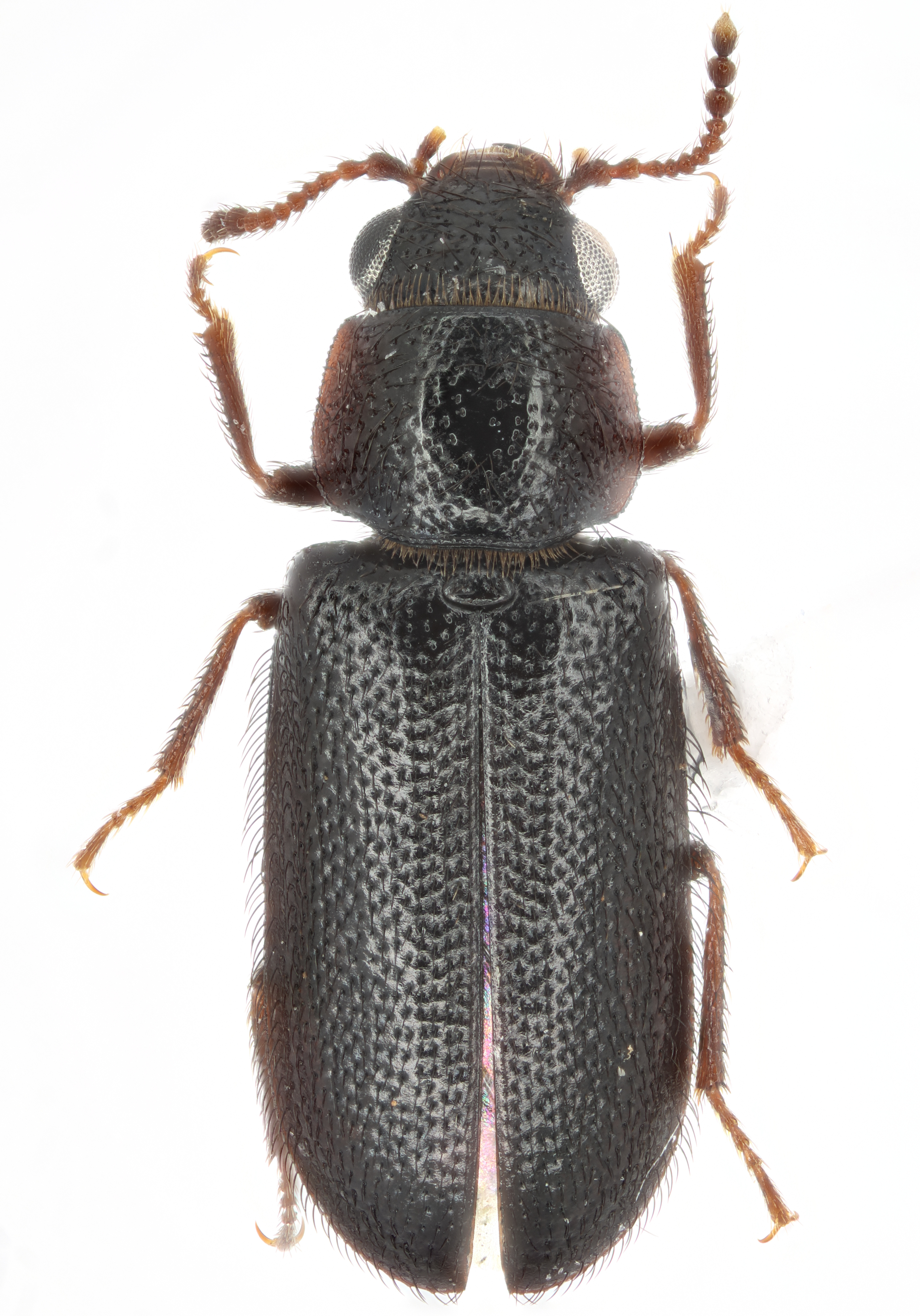

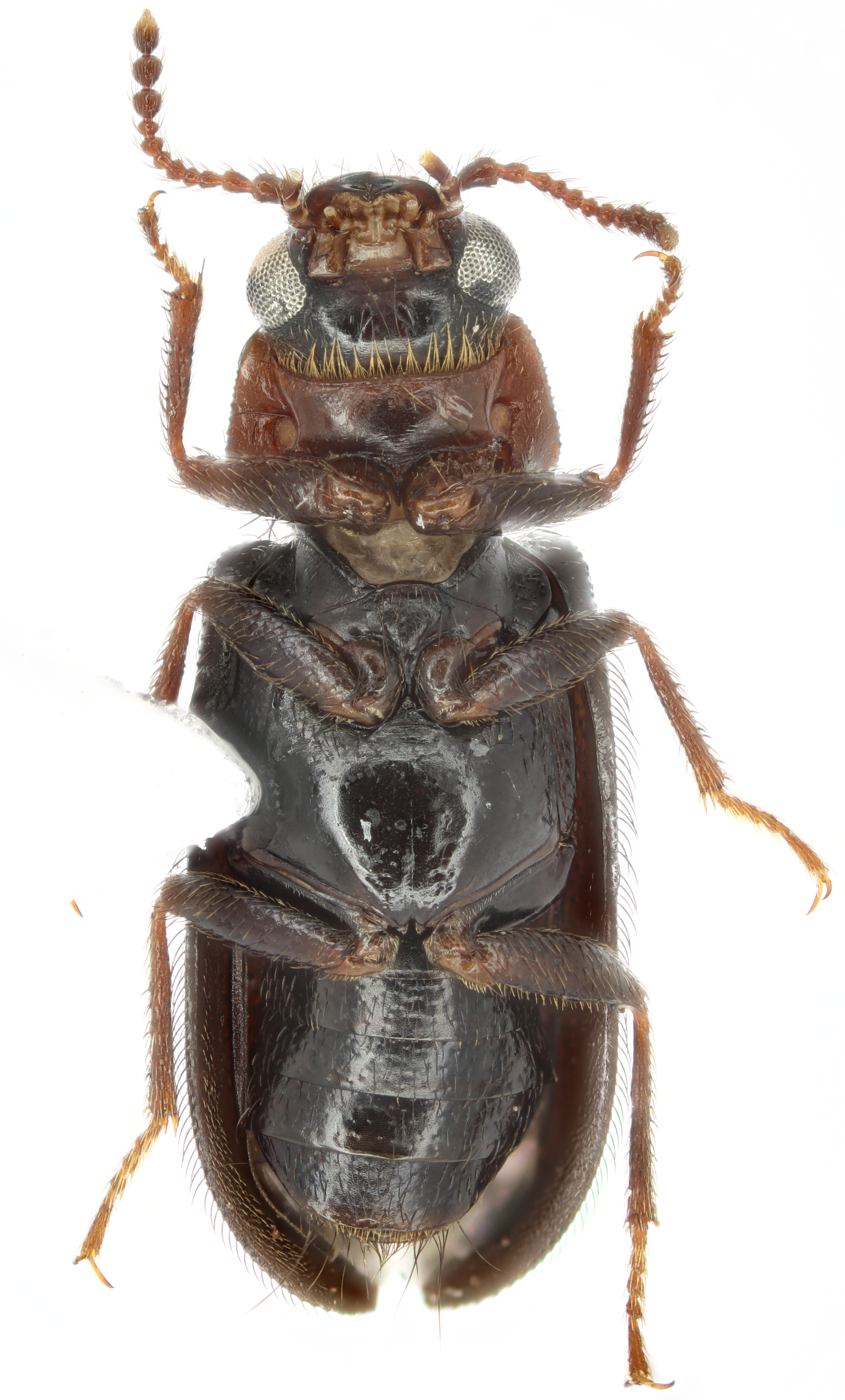

Scientific classification
- Kingdom: Animalia
- Phylum: Arthropoda
- Clade: Pancrustacea
- Class: Insecta
- Order: Coleoptera
- Suborder: Polyphaga
- Infraorder: Cucujiformia
- Superfamily: Cleroidea
- Family: Acanthocnemidae; Crowson, 1970
- Genus: Acanthocnemus; Perris, 1867
- Species: A. nigricans

Binomial name
- Acanthocnemus nigricans (Hope, 1843)

= Acanthocnemus =

Genus of beetles

Acanthocnemus nigricans is a species of cleroid beetle, the only species in the genus Acanthocnemus and the family Acanthocnemidae. Originally native to Australia, the species has spread in modern times to numerous parts of the world, including Europe, Africa, India and Southeast Asia. The insects are pyrophilous, congregating around areas of recently burned wood, being attracted to chemicals found in wood smoke. They have specialised infrared receptors located on the thorax close to the head, used to detect heat. Their life cycle is poorly understood, though mating and egg-laying likely occurs within ash. The larvae are possibly saprophagous.
