= Malgassochaetus quadraticollis =

Scientific classification
- Kingdom: Animalia
- Phylum: Arthropoda
- Class: Insecta
- Order: Coleoptera
- Suborder: Polyphaga
- Infraorder: Cucujiformia
- Family: Chaetosomatidae
- Genus: Malgassochaetus
- Species: M. quadraticollis

Binomial name
- Malgassochaetus quadraticollis (Menier & Ekis, 1982)

Synonyms
- Somatochaetus quadraticollis Menier & Ekis, 1982

Species of beetle

Malgassochaetus quadraticollis is a species of beetles in the family Chaetosomatidae. It is found in Madagascar.
