= Boleopsis =

Boleopsis Temporal range: Eocene

Scientific classification
- Domain: Eukaryota
- Kingdom: Animalia
- Phylum: Arthropoda
- Class: Insecta
- Order: Coleoptera
- Suborder: Polyphaga
- Infraorder: Cucujiformia
- Superfamily: Cleroidea
- Family: †Boleopsidae; Kirejtshuk & Nel, 2013
- Genus: †Boleopsis; Kirejtshuk & Nel, 2013
- Species: †B. polinae

Binomial name
- †Boleopsis polinae Kirejtshuk & Nel, 2013

Genus of beetles

Boleopsis is an extinct genus of beetles from the Eocene aged Oise amber of France; it contains a single described species, Boleopsis polinae, and is the only member of the family Boleopsidae.
