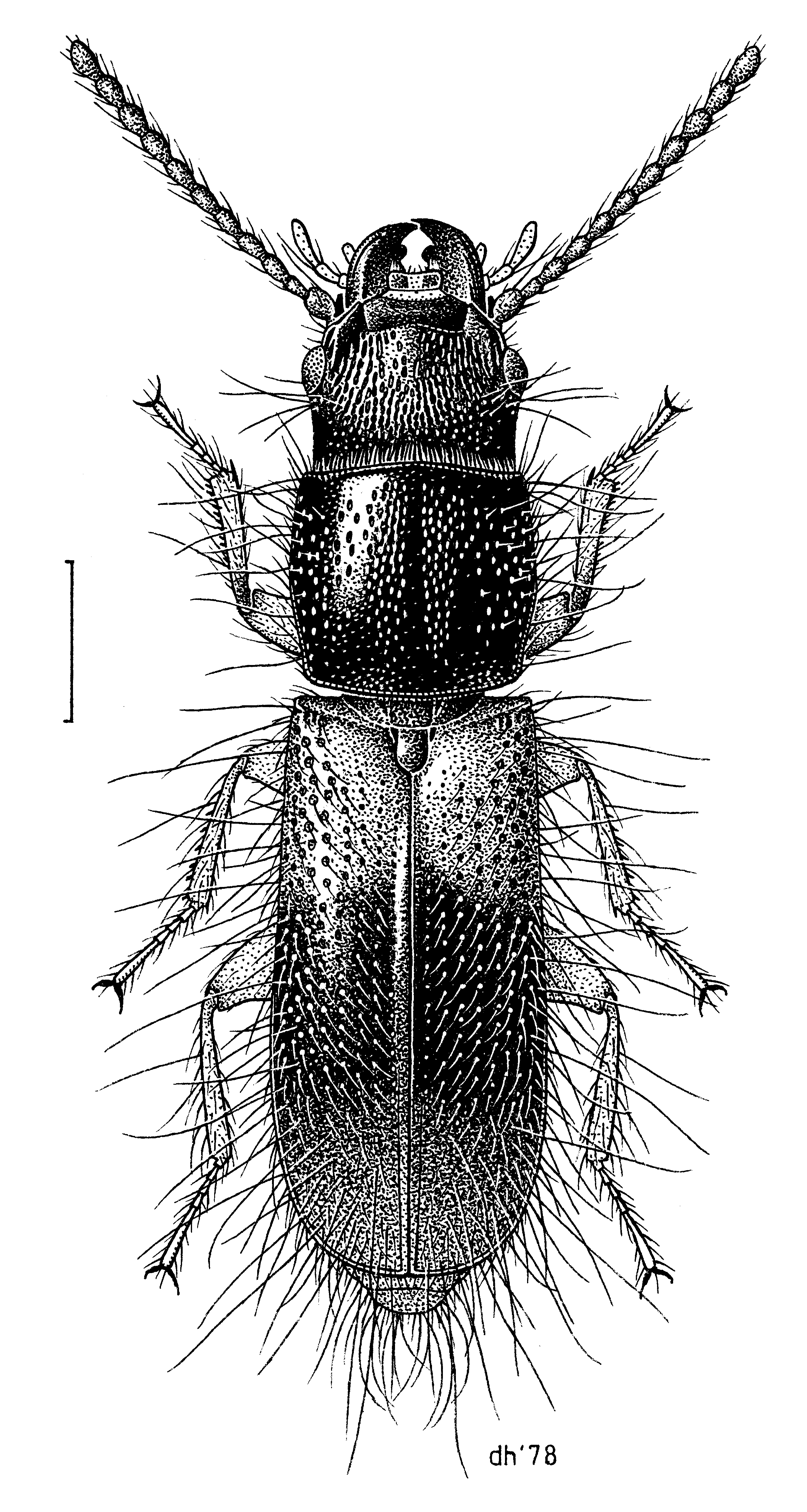
- Chaetosoma scaritides
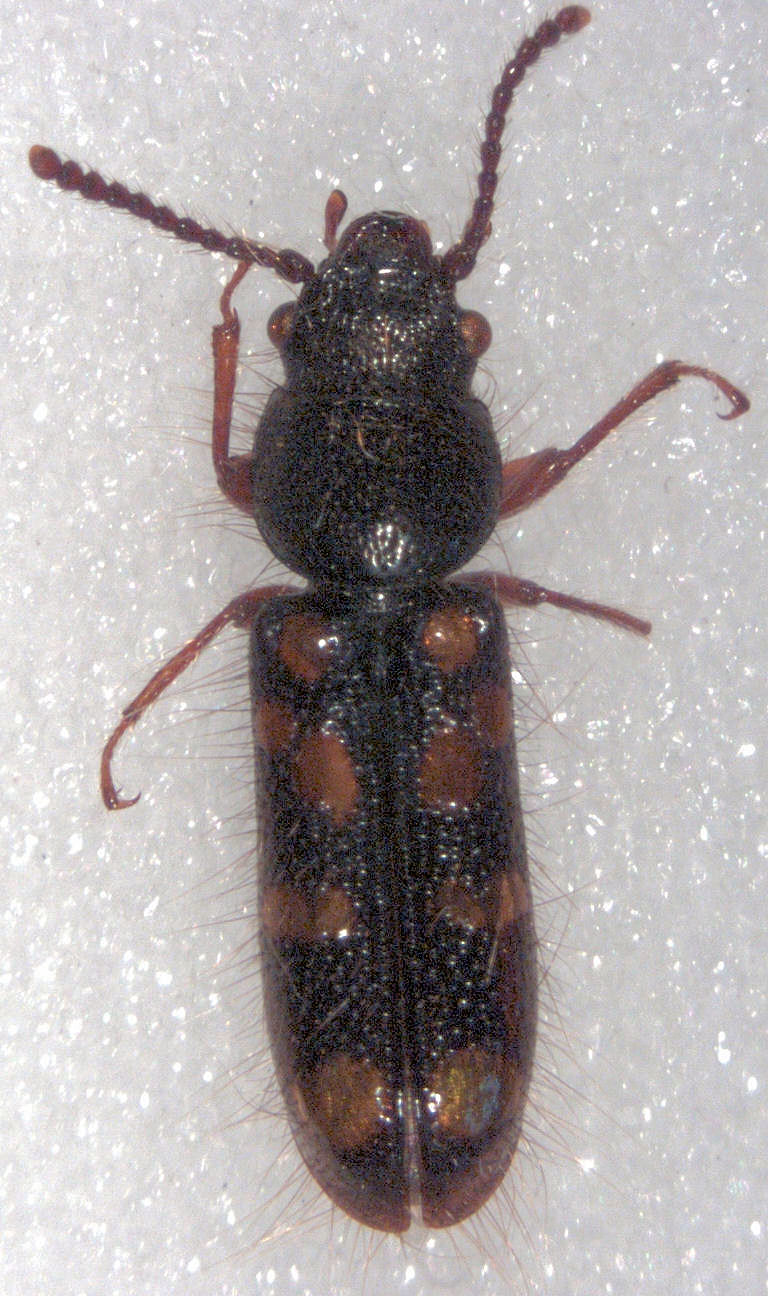
- Chaetosomodes halli

Scientific classification
- Kingdom: Animalia
- Phylum: Arthropoda
- Clade: Pancrustacea
- Class: Insecta
- Order: Coleoptera
- Suborder: Polyphaga
- Infraorder: Cucujiformia
- Superfamily: Cleroidea
- Family: Chaetosomatidae; Crowson, 1952

Genera
- See text

= Chaetosomatidae =

Family of beetles

Chaetosomatidae is a small family of beetles, in the superfamily Cleroidea. There are three extant genera, two of which (Chaetosoma and Chaetosomodes) are endemic to New Zealand with the other (Malgassochaetus) native to Madagascar. Members of this family are predaceous on wood-boring insects.

== Taxonomy ==
- Genus Chaetosoma Westwood, 1851
  - Chaetosoma colossa Opitz, 2010
  - Chaetosoma scaritides Westwood, 1851
- Genus Chaetosomodes Broun, 1921
  - Chaetosomodes halli Broun, 1921
- Genus Malgassochaetus Ekis & Menier, 1980
  - Malgassochaetus cordicollis (Menier & Ekis, 1982)
  - Malgassochaetus crowsoni Ekis & Menier, 1980
  - Malgassochaetus descarpentriesi Ekis & Menier, 1980
  - Malgassochaetus pauliani Ekis & Menier, 1980
  - Malgassochaetus penicillatus Menier & Ekis, 1982
  - Malgassochaetus quadraticollis (Menier & Ekis, 1982)
  - Malgassochaetus sogai Menier, 1991
  - Malgassochaetus viettei Menier & Ekis, 1982

Genetic studies have suggested that Metaxina should also be considered a member of Chaetosomatidae, rather than constituting its own family.
