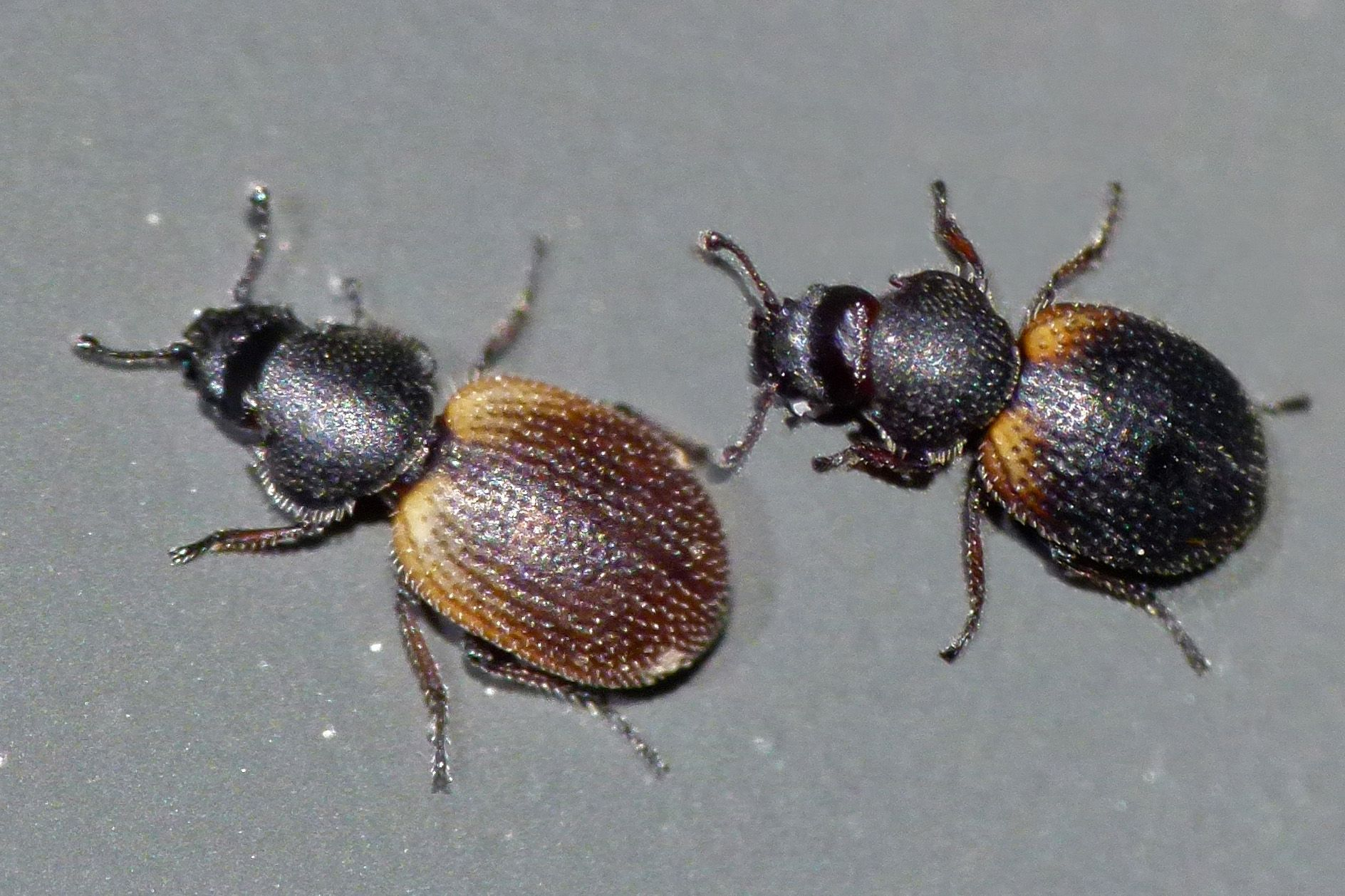

Scientific classification
- Kingdom: Animalia
- Phylum: Arthropoda
- Clade: Pancrustacea
- Class: Insecta
- Order: Coleoptera
- Suborder: Polyphaga
- Infraorder: Cucujiformia
- Family: Phycosecidae
- Genus: Phycosecis
- Species: P. limbata

Binomial name
- Phycosecis limbata (Fabricius, 1781)

Synonyms
- Dermestes limbatus Fabricius, 1781; Phycosecis atomaria Pascoe, 1875; Phycosecis discoidea Pascoe, 1875

= Phycosecis limbata =

Species of beetle

Phycosecis limbata is a species of Phycosecidae beetle endemic to New Zealand. It was first described by Johan Fabricius in 1781. They are a coloured black and are covered in little punctures with setae sticking out of them. P. limbata are restricted to sandy coasts throughout New Zealand, including on the Chatham Islands. They act as scavengers that feed on carrion. Reportedly they have a high thermal tolerance and are diurnal.

== Taxonomy ==
This species was first described in 1781 by Johan Christian Fabricius as Dermestes limbatus. In 1875, Francis Polkinghorne Pascoe described Phycosecis atomaria and Phycosecis discoidea, which were later recognised as synonyms of P. limbata. The type specimens are stored in the Natural History Museum of London.

== Description ==
The adults are 2.5-2.75mm in length. The bodies overall colour is black with the elytra varying from pure black to black with pale ochreous markings near the base of it. The prothorax has a round shape. The body is covered in a series of small punctures, with each puncture having a small white setae protruding from it.

== Distribution and habitat ==
Phycosecis limbata are endemic to New Zealand where they are widespread on sandy coasts. They are also known to occur in the Chatham Islands and the Kermadec Islands. They most commonly occur above the high tide mark on the beach and also less commonly occur further inland in sand dunes. In one study, they were more common in summer than winter.

== Diet ==
This species is a scavenger that feeds on carrion that washes up on the beach. They can often be found in high densities by shaking them out of the carrion. The larvae also feed on carrion.

== Behaviour ==
Phycosecis limbata are reportedly diurnal. They often hide beneath the sand, using their heads to scoop up the sand and their legs to kick it away. They burrow around 1.80cm underneath the sand. P. limbata has a high level of heat tolerance of up to 49.5°C.
