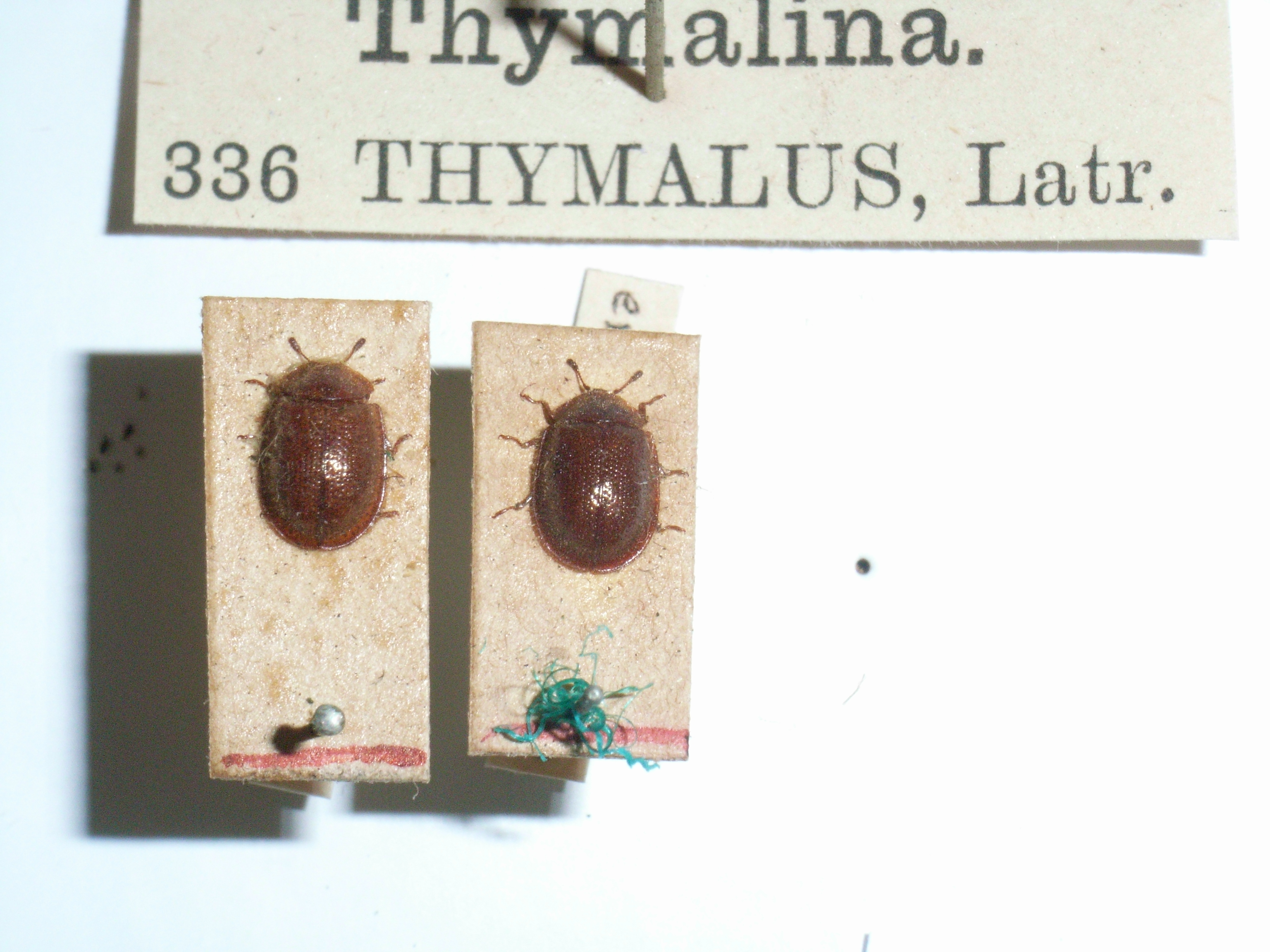
- Thymalus limbatus

Scientific classification
- Domain: Eukaryota
- Kingdom: Animalia
- Phylum: Arthropoda
- Class: Insecta
- Order: Coleoptera
- Suborder: Polyphaga
- Infraorder: Cucujiformia
- Family: Thymalidae
- Subfamily: Thymalinae
- Tribe: Thymalini
- Genus: Thymalus; Schiødte, 1838

Species
- See text

= Thymalus =

Genus of beetles

Thymalus is a genus of beetles belonging to the family Thymalidae.

The genus was described in 1802 by Pierre André Latreille.

The species of this genus are found in Eurasia and North America.

Selected species:

- Thymalus amamiensis Miyatake, 1985
- Thymalus limbatus (Fabricius, 1787)
