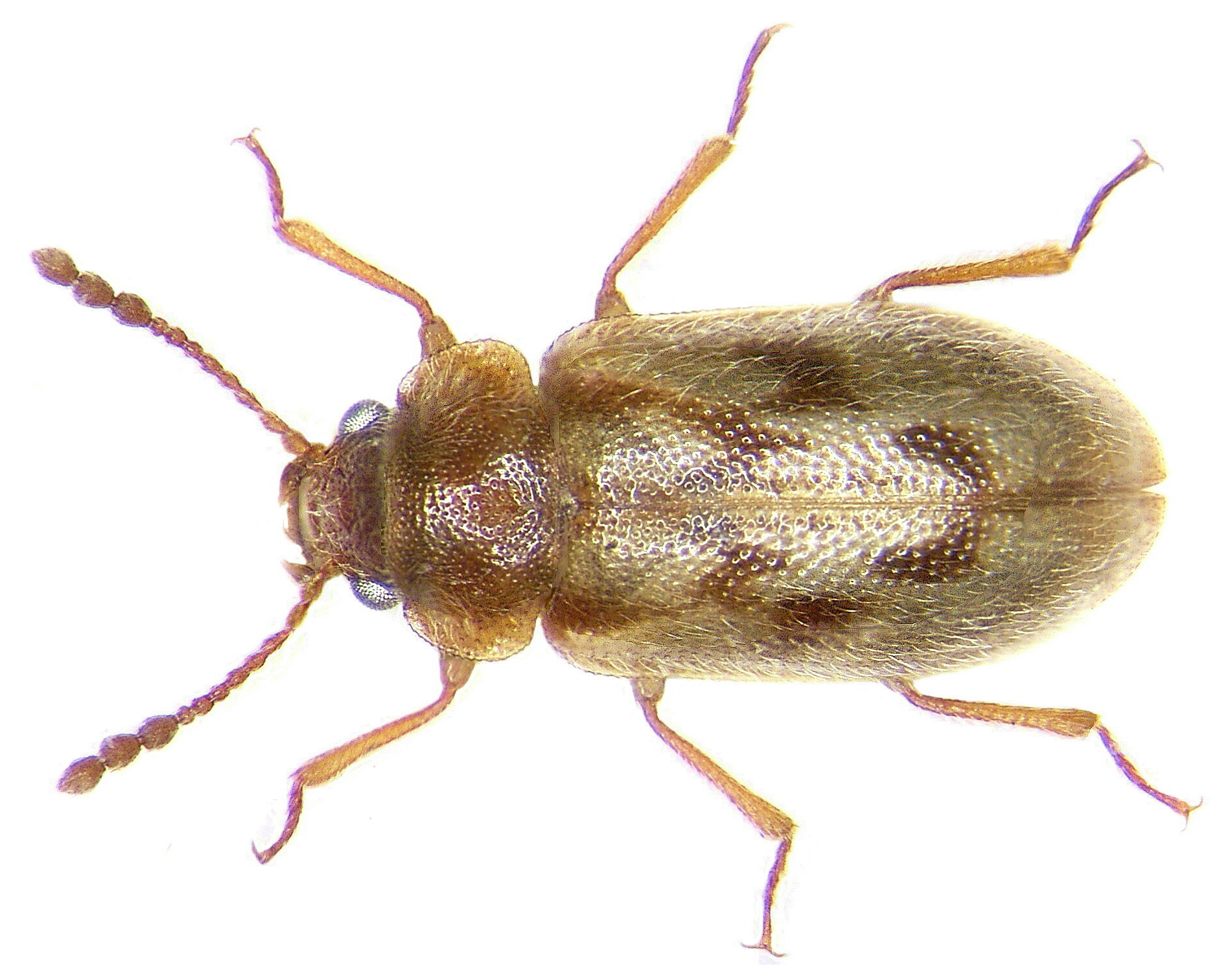
- Phloiophilus edwardsii 2,5-3,3 mm

Scientific classification
- Kingdom: Animalia
- Phylum: Arthropoda
- Clade: Pancrustacea
- Class: Insecta
- Order: Coleoptera
- Suborder: Polyphaga
- Infraorder: Cucujiformia
- Superfamily: Cleroidea
- Family: Phloiophilidae; Kiesenwetter, 1863
- Genus: Phloiophilus; Stephens, 1830
- Species: P. edwardsii

Binomial name
- Phloiophilus edwardsii Stephens, 1830

= Phloiophilus =

Genus of beetles

Phloiophilus edwardsii is the sole known species of the beetle family Phloiophilidae in the superfamily Cleroidea. It is native to Europe. The larvae are mycophagous, and have been observed feeding on basidiomycetes of the genus Phlebia growing on dead oak branches. The larvae are active during the winter period, before entering the soil to pupate in late spring-early summer.
