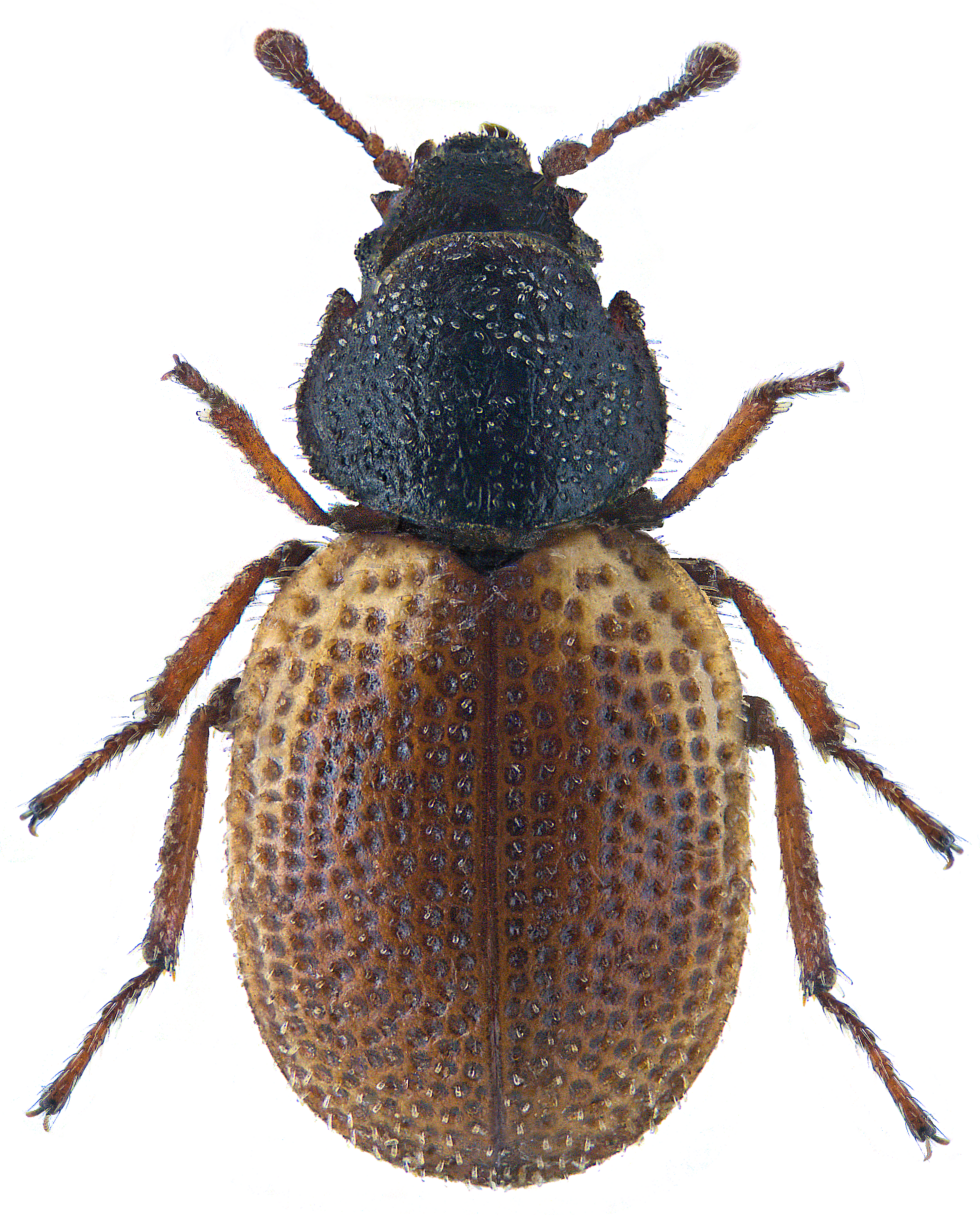
- Phycosecis litoralis Pascoe, 1875

Scientific classification
- Kingdom: Animalia
- Phylum: Arthropoda
- Clade: Pancrustacea
- Class: Insecta
- Order: Coleoptera
- Suborder: Polyphaga
- Infraorder: Cucujiformia
- Superfamily: Cleroidea
- Family: Phycosecidae; Crowson, 1952
- Genus: Phycosecis; Pascoe, 1875

= Phycosecidae =

Family of beetles

Phycosecidae is a family of beetles in the superfamily Cleroidea., containing the single genus Phycosecis found in Australia, New Caledonia, New Zealand and Vanuatu. The beetles are small, about 1.5–3.5 mm in length. They live in sandy coastal areas, and are saprophagous, feeding on faeces, carrion, and dead arthropods during the daytime.

== Taxonomy ==
The species are:

- Phycosecis ammophilus Lea, 1899
- Phycosecis hilli Lea, 1921
- Phycosecis limbata (Fabricius, 1781)
- Phycosecis litoralis Pascoe, 1875
