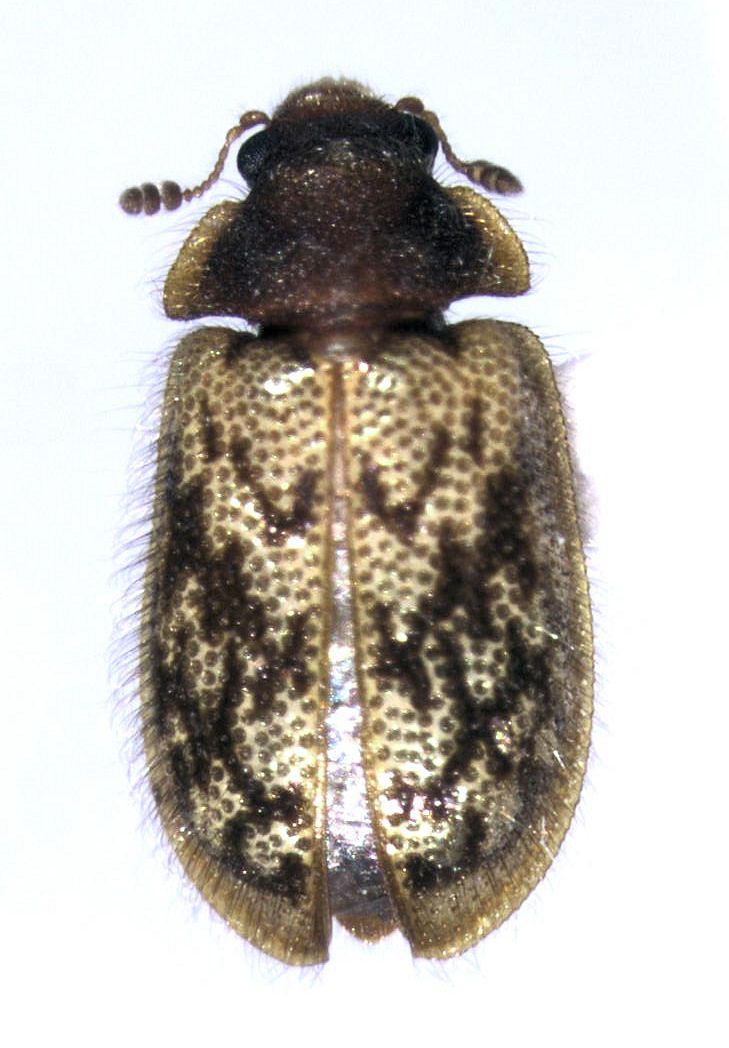

Scientific classification
- Kingdom: Animalia
- Phylum: Arthropoda
- Clade: Pancrustacea
- Class: Insecta
- Order: Coleoptera
- Suborder: Polyphaga
- Infraorder: Cucujiformia
- Superfamily: Cleroidea
- Family: Protopeltidae; Crowson, 1966
- Genus: Protopeltis; Crowson, 1964

Type species
- Protopeltis viridescens (Broun, 1886)

Other species
- Protopeltis pulchella (Broun, 1915)

= Protopeltis =

Genus of beetles

Protopeltis is a genus of beetles. It contains two species native to New Zealand. It was formerly considered a member of Trogossitidae, but is currently placed as the only member of the family Protopeltidae within the Cleroidea. The larvae have been collected from the fungus infested bark of dead Nothofagus trees. Adult gut contents indicate that they are mycophagous, feeding on probably Hymenochaete fungi. This is also presumably true for the larvae.
