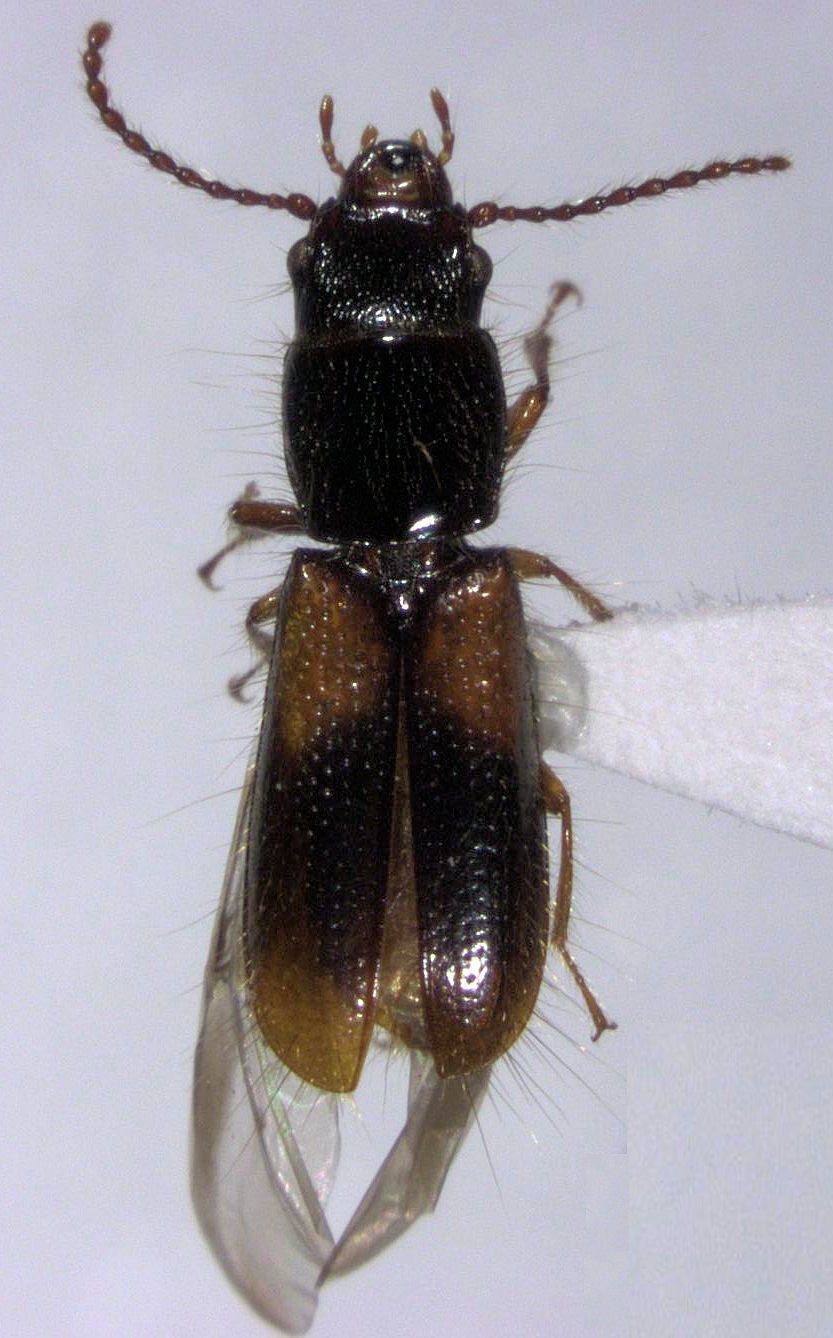

Scientific classification
- Kingdom: Animalia
- Phylum: Arthropoda
- Clade: Pancrustacea
- Class: Insecta
- Order: Coleoptera
- Suborder: Polyphaga
- Infraorder: Cucujiformia
- Family: Chaetosomatidae
- Genus: Chaetosoma
- Species: C. scaritides

Binomial name
- Chaetosoma scaritides Westwood, 1851

= Chaetosoma scaritides =

Species of beetle

Chaetosoma scaritides is a species of beetles in the family Chaetosomatidae. It was first described by John O. Westwood in 1851 and is the type species of its genus. This species in endemic to New Zealand.
