= Mauroniscidae =

Scientific classification
- Domain: Eukaryota
- Kingdom: Animalia
- Phylum: Arthropoda
- Class: Insecta
- Order: Coleoptera
- Suborder: Polyphaga
- Infraorder: Cucujiformia
- Superfamily: Cleroidea
- Family: Mauroniscidae; Majer, 1995

Family of beetles

Mauroniscidae is a family of cleroid beetles, formerly included in the family Melyridae. There are presently five or six genera and roughly 30 described species in Mauroniscidae, all of which are native to the Americas. Almost nothing is known about their biology.

== Genera ==
- Amecomycter Majer, 1995
- Mauroniscus Bourgeois, 1911
- Mecomycter Horn, 1882
- Mectemycor Majer, 1995
- Scuromanius Majer, 1995

=== Incertae sedis in Mauroniscidae ===
- Dasyrhadus Fall, 1910
