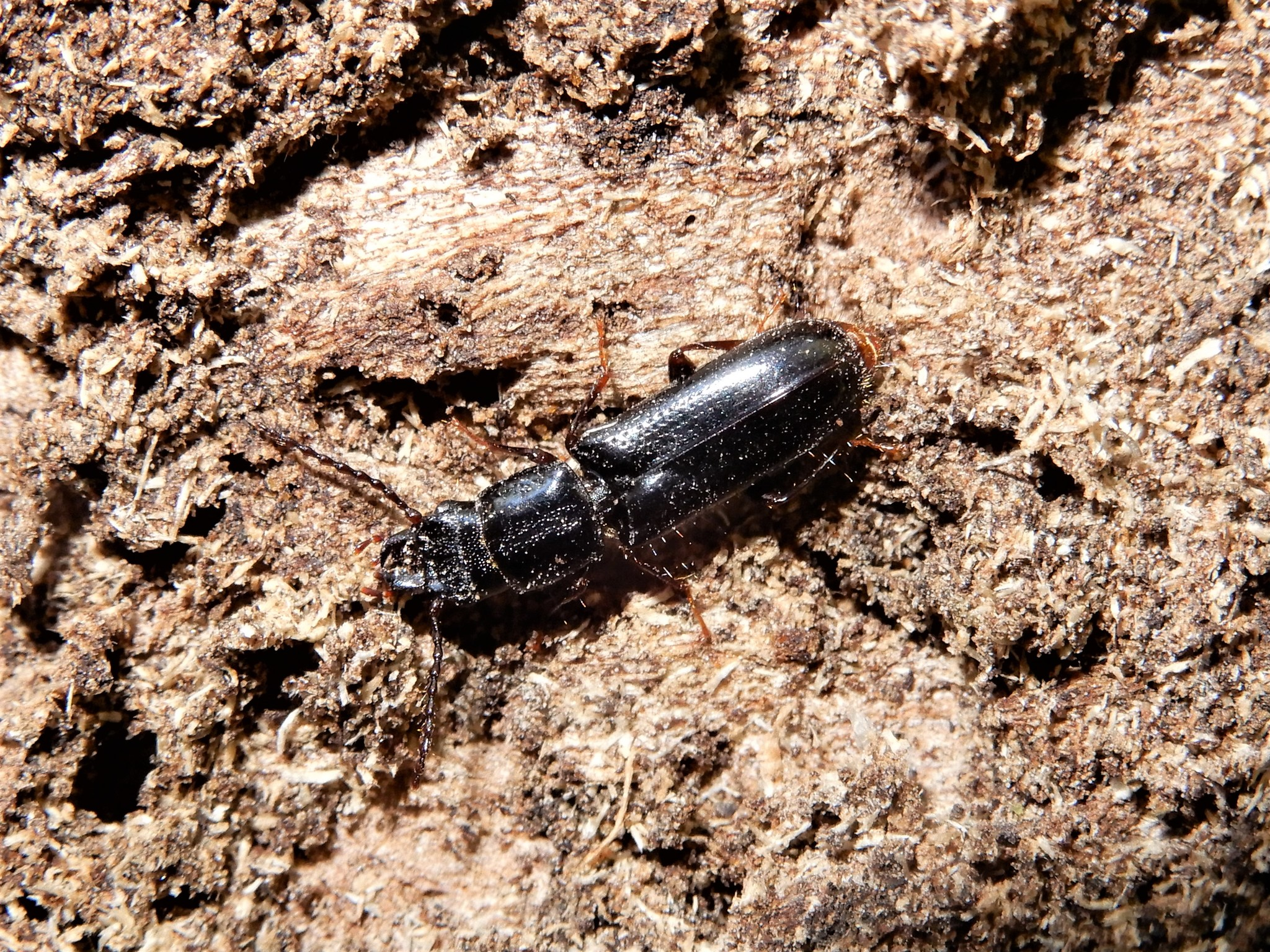
- Chaetosoma colossa, New Zealand

Scientific classification
- Kingdom: Animalia
- Phylum: Arthropoda
- Class: Insecta
- Order: Coleoptera
- Suborder: Polyphaga
- Infraorder: Cucujiformia
- Family: Chaetosomatidae
- Genus: Chaetosoma
- Species: C. colossa

Binomial name
- Chaetosoma colossa Opitz, 2010

= Chaetosoma colossa =

Species of beetle

Chaetosoma colossa is a species of beetle in the family Chaetosomatidae endemic to New Zealand.

== Taxonomy and etymology ==
This species was described in 2010 by Weston Opitz from specimens collected throughout New Zealand. The holotype is stored in the New Zealand Arthropod Collection under registration number NZAC04040194. The specific name "colossa" refers to the large size of the species.

== Description ==
The adult beetles are 6.6-13.0mm (0.259-0.511) in length. They are generally coloured black, but smaller individuals may be dark brown. This large size and dark colour separates them from the only other species in the genus, which is smaller and has light brown markings on its abdomen.

== Distribution and habitat ==
Chaetosoma colossa is endemic to New Zealand, where it is widespread on both main islands and on Stewart Island. They are associated with the species of dead trees such as Hoheria sexstylosa, Myoporum laetum and Podocarpus dacrydioides.

== Diet ==
They have been recorded feeding on the larvae of Psepholax weevils.
