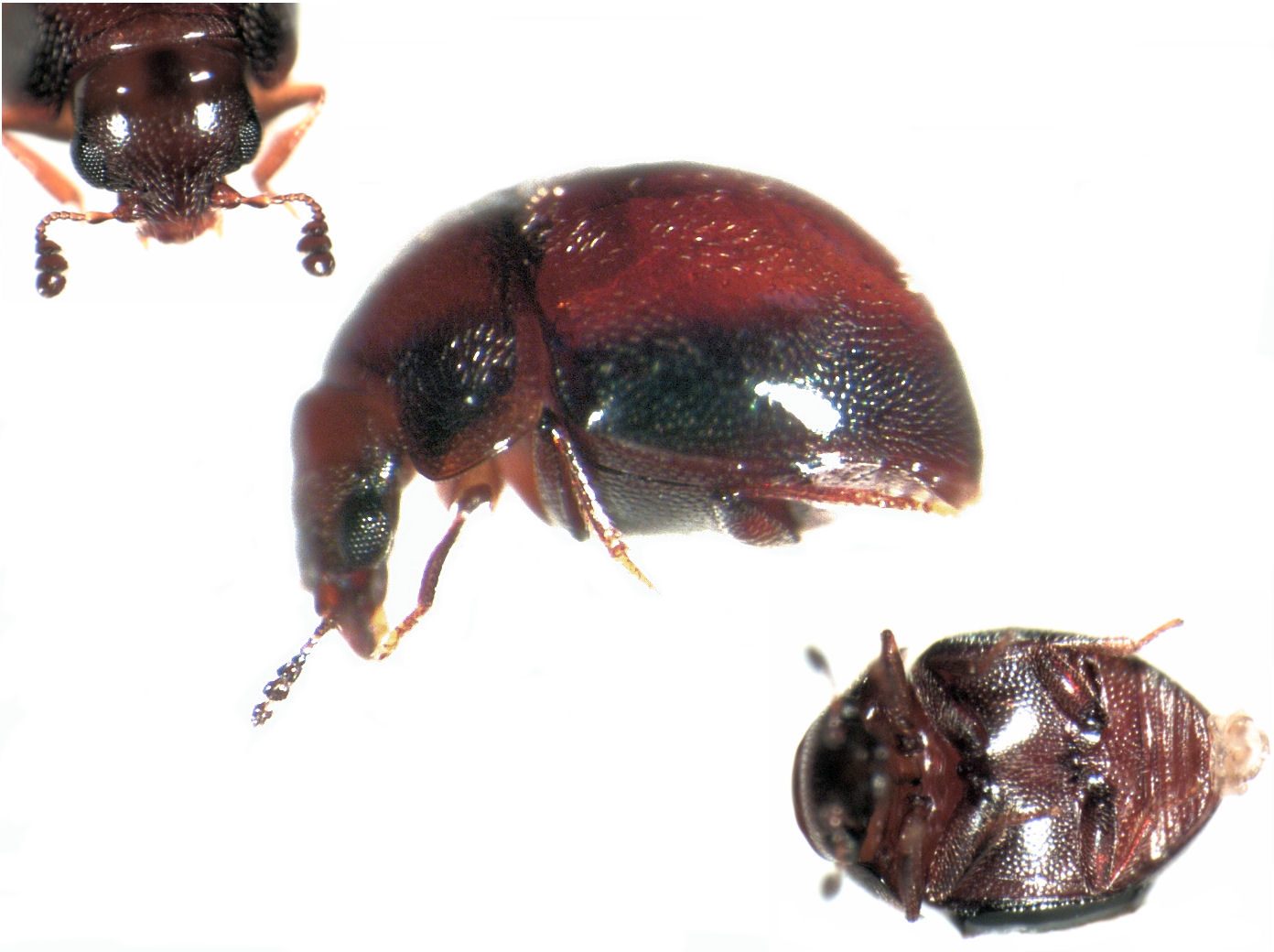

Scientific classification
- Kingdom: Animalia
- Phylum: Arthropoda
- Class: Insecta
- Order: Coleoptera
- Suborder: Polyphaga
- Infraorder: Cucujiformia
- Family: Rentoniidae
- Genus: Rentonium
- Species: R. bicolor

Binomial name
- Rentonium bicolor Gimmel & Leschen, 2014

= Rentonium bicolor =

Species of beetle

Rentonium bicolor is a species of beetle in the family Rentoniidae.

== Distribution ==
New Zealand.
