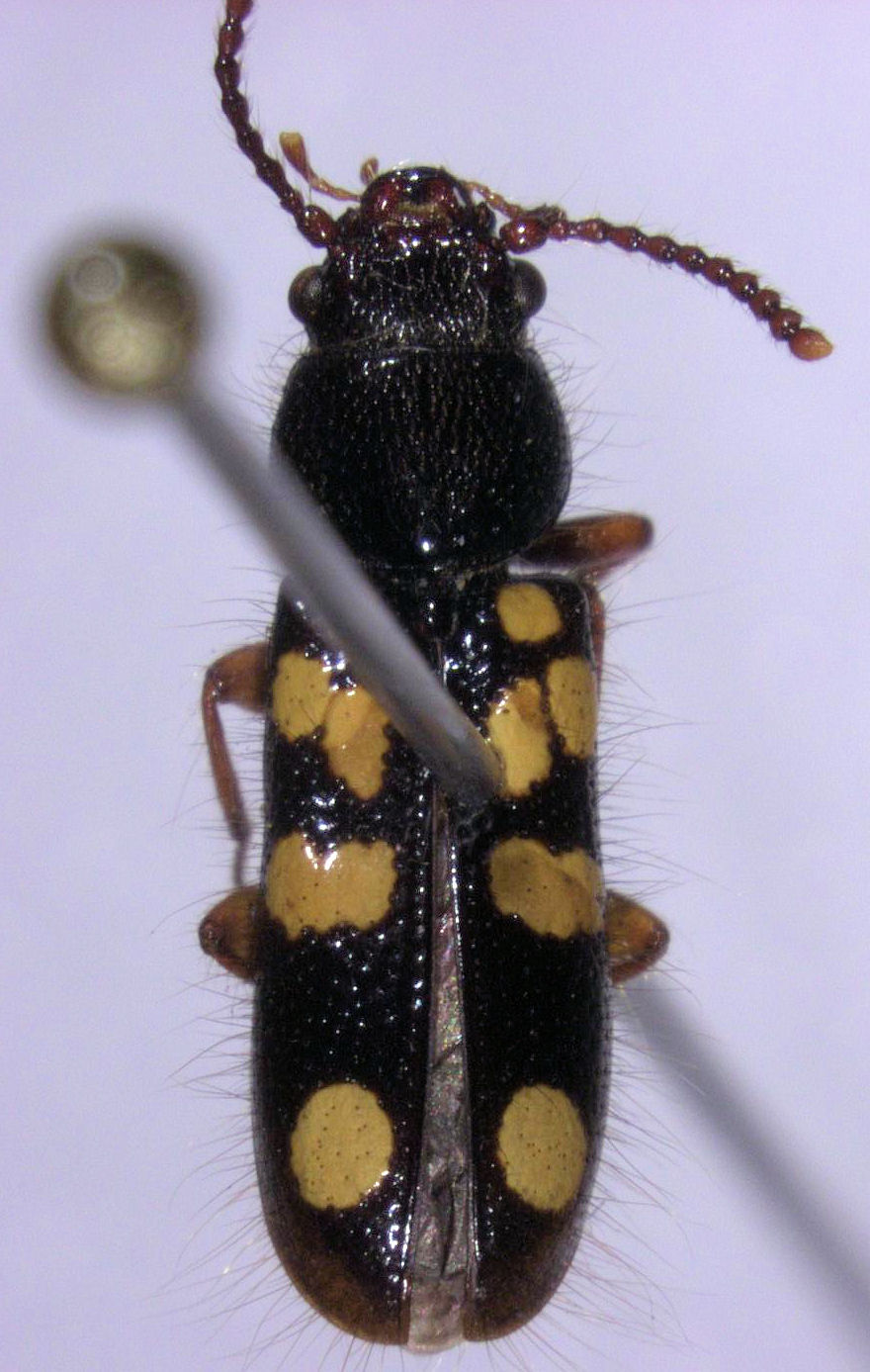
- adult Chaetosomodes halli. Canterbury Region, New Zealand.

Scientific classification
- Kingdom: Animalia
- Phylum: Arthropoda
- Class: Insecta
- Order: Coleoptera
- Suborder: Polyphaga
- Infraorder: Cucujiformia
- Family: Chaetosomatidae
- Genus: Chaetosomodes; Broun, 1921
- Species: C. halli

Binomial name
- Chaetosomodes halli Broun, 1921

= Chaetosomodes =

Genus of beetles

Chaetosomodes is a genus of beetles in the family Chaetosomatidae, containing the single species Chaetosomodes halli.
