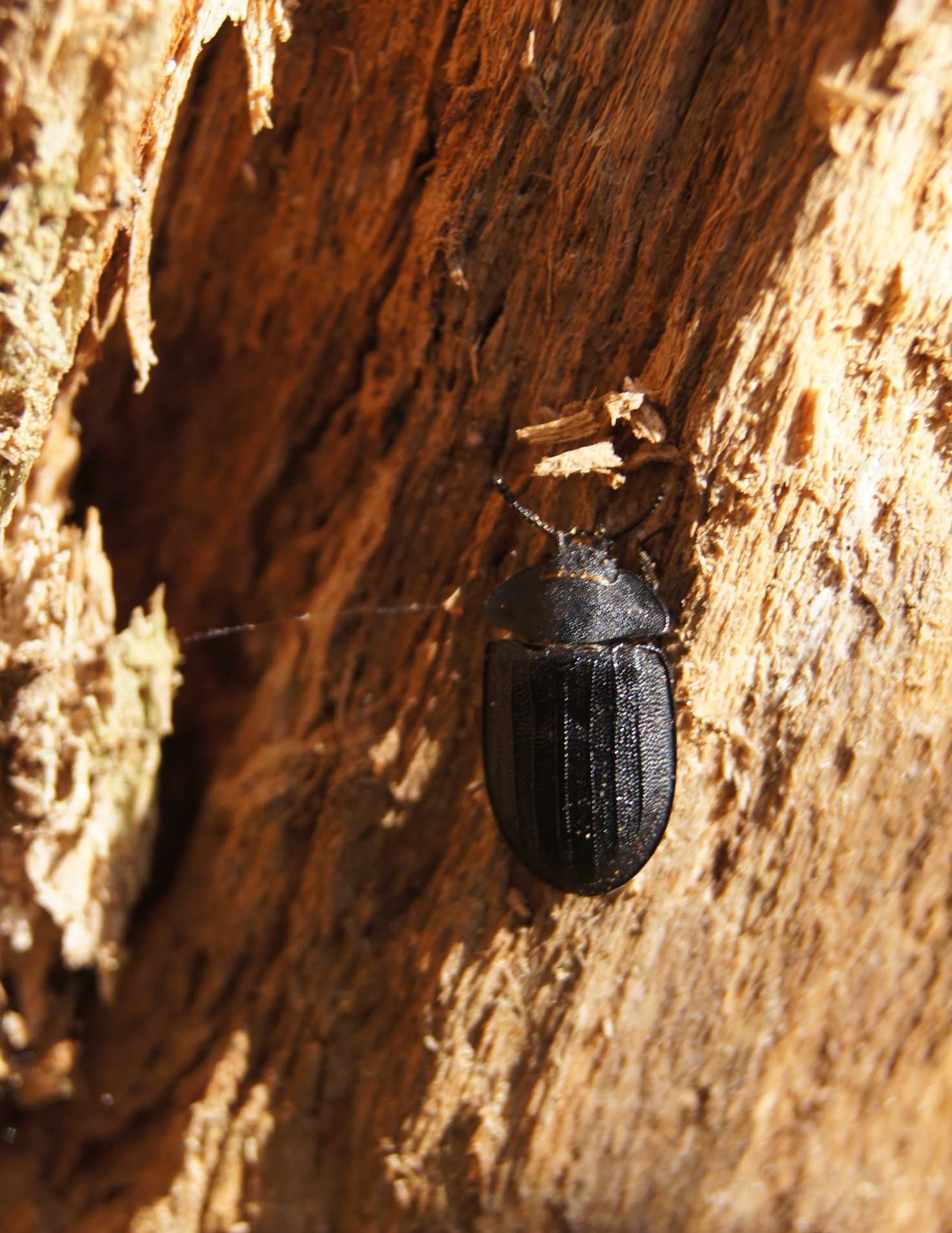

Scientific classification
- Kingdom: Animalia
- Phylum: Arthropoda
- Class: Insecta
- Order: Coleoptera
- Suborder: Polyphaga
- Infraorder: Cucujiformia
- Family: Peltidae
- Genus: Peltis
- Species: P. grossa

Binomial name
- Peltis grossa (Linnaeus, 1758)

= Peltis grossa =

Species of beetle

Peltis grossa is a species of beetle belonging to the family Trogossitidae.

It is native to Europe.

Synonym:

- Silpha grossa Linnaeus, 1758 (= basionym)
