= Malgassochaetus viettei =

Scientific classification
- Kingdom: Animalia
- Phylum: Arthropoda
- Class: Insecta
- Order: Coleoptera
- Suborder: Polyphaga
- Infraorder: Cucujiformia
- Family: Chaetosomatidae
- Genus: Malgassochaetus
- Species: M. viettei

Binomial name
- Malgassochaetus viettei (Menier & Ekis, 1982)

Species of beetle

Malgassochaetus viettei is a species of beetles in the family Chaetosomatidae. It is found in Madagascar.
