= Malgassochaetus =

Scientific classification
- Domain: Eukaryota
- Kingdom: Animalia
- Phylum: Arthropoda
- Class: Insecta
- Order: Coleoptera
- Suborder: Polyphaga
- Infraorder: Cucujiformia
- Family: Chaetosomatidae
- Genus: Malgassochaetus; Ekis & Menier, 1980

Type species
- Malgassochaetus crowsoni Ekis & Menier, 1980

Species
- See text

Synonyms
- Somatochaetus Menier & Ekis, 1982

Genus of beetles

Malgassochaetus is a genus of beetles in the family Chaetosomatidae.

== Species ==
- Malgassochaetus cordicollis (Menier & Ekis, 1982)
- Malgassochaetus crowsoni Ekis & Menier, 1980 (type)
- Malgassochaetus descarpentriesi Ekis & Menier, 1980
- Malgassochaetus pauliani Ekis & Menier, 1980
- Malgassochaetus penicillatus Menier & Ekis, 1982
- Malgassochaetus quadraticollis (Menier & Ekis, 1982)
- Malgassochaetus sogai Menier, 1991
- Malgassochaetus viettei Menier & Ekis, 1982
