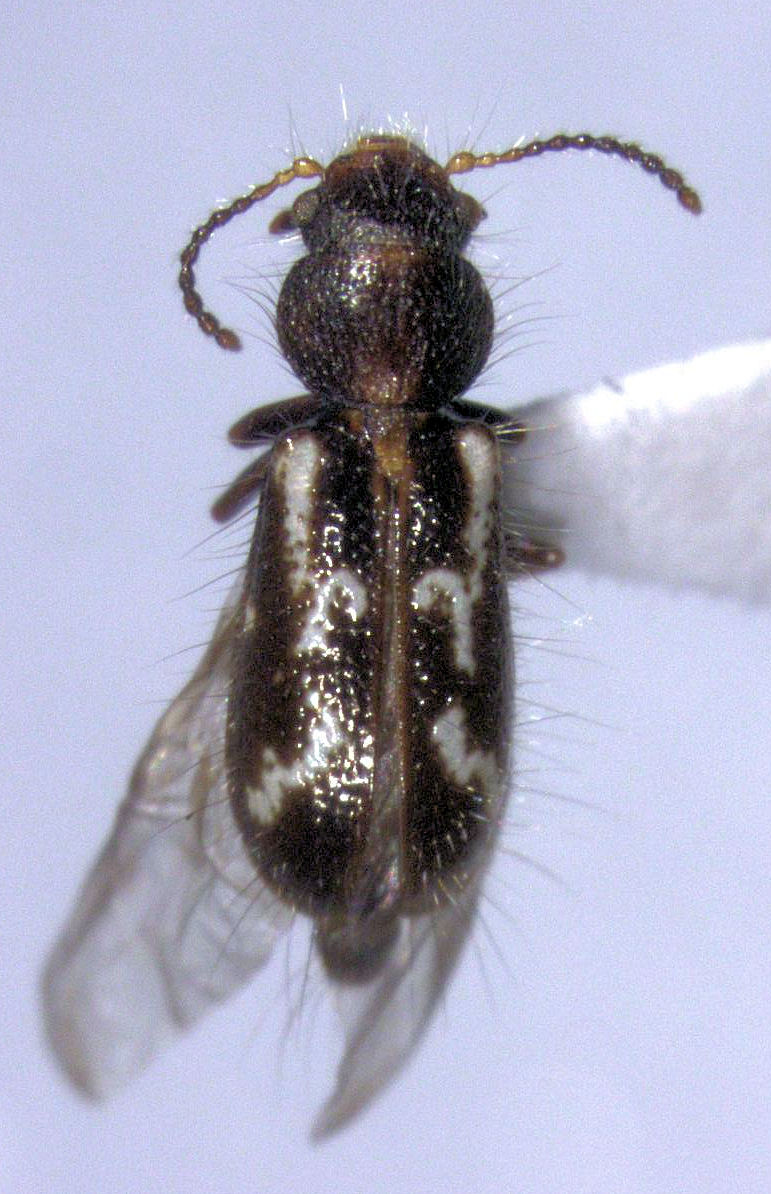
- Metaxina ornata

Scientific classification
- Kingdom: Animalia
- Phylum: Arthropoda
- Clade: Pancrustacea
- Class: Insecta
- Order: Coleoptera
- Suborder: Polyphaga
- Infraorder: Cucujiformia
- Superfamily: Cleroidea
- Family: Metaxinidae; Kolibáč, 2004
- Genus: Metaxina; Broun, 1909
- Species: M. ornata

Binomial name
- Metaxina ornata Broun, 1909

= Metaxina =

Genus of beetles

Metaxina is the only genus in the beetle family Metaxinidae. Its only species is Metaxina ornata. It endemic to the South island of New Zealand, where it is associated with sooty mold growing on Nothofagus trees. Both the larvae and adults are likely predaceous, feeding on insects and other arthropods. It is considered to be a member of the superfamily Cleroidea. Genetic studies have suggested that Metaxina should be considered a member of Chaetosomatidae, rather than constituting its own family.
