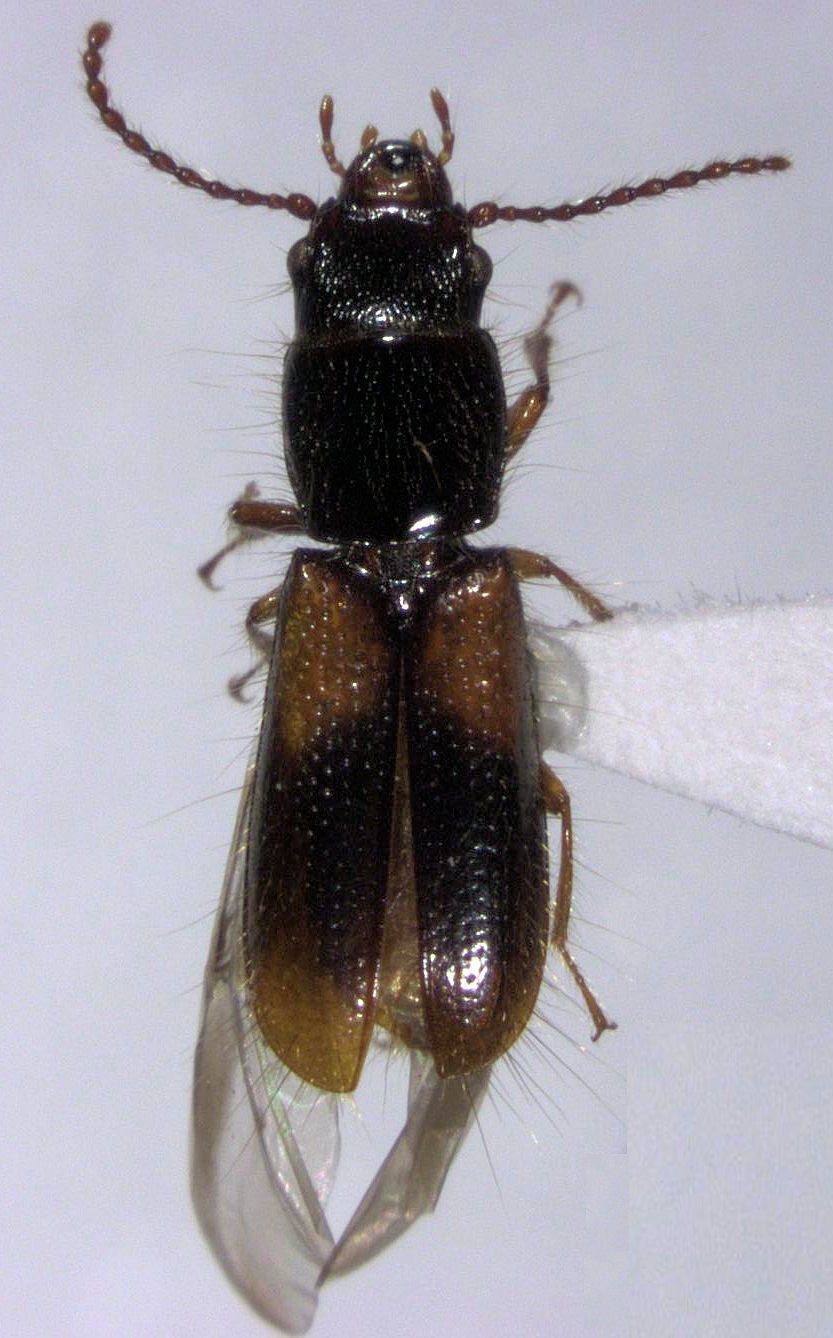
- Chaetosoma scaritides

Scientific classification
- Kingdom: Animalia
- Phylum: Arthropoda
- Class: Insecta
- Order: Coleoptera
- Suborder: Polyphaga
- Infraorder: Cucujiformia
- Family: Chaetosomatidae
- Genus: Chaetosoma; Westwood, 1851

Synonyms
- Chaetosoma Dejean 1835 Nom. Nud.; Katachaetosoma Opitz 2014

= Chaetosoma =

Genus of beetles

Chaetosoma is a genus of beetles in the family Chaetosomatidae. There are at least two described species in Chaetosoma, found in New Zealand.

The name Chaetosoma was published twice prior to 1851, but these older uses have been declared unavailable under the ICZN.

== Species ==
These two species belong to the genus Chaetosoma:

- Chaetosoma colossa Opitz, 2010
- Chaetosoma scaritides Westwood, 1851
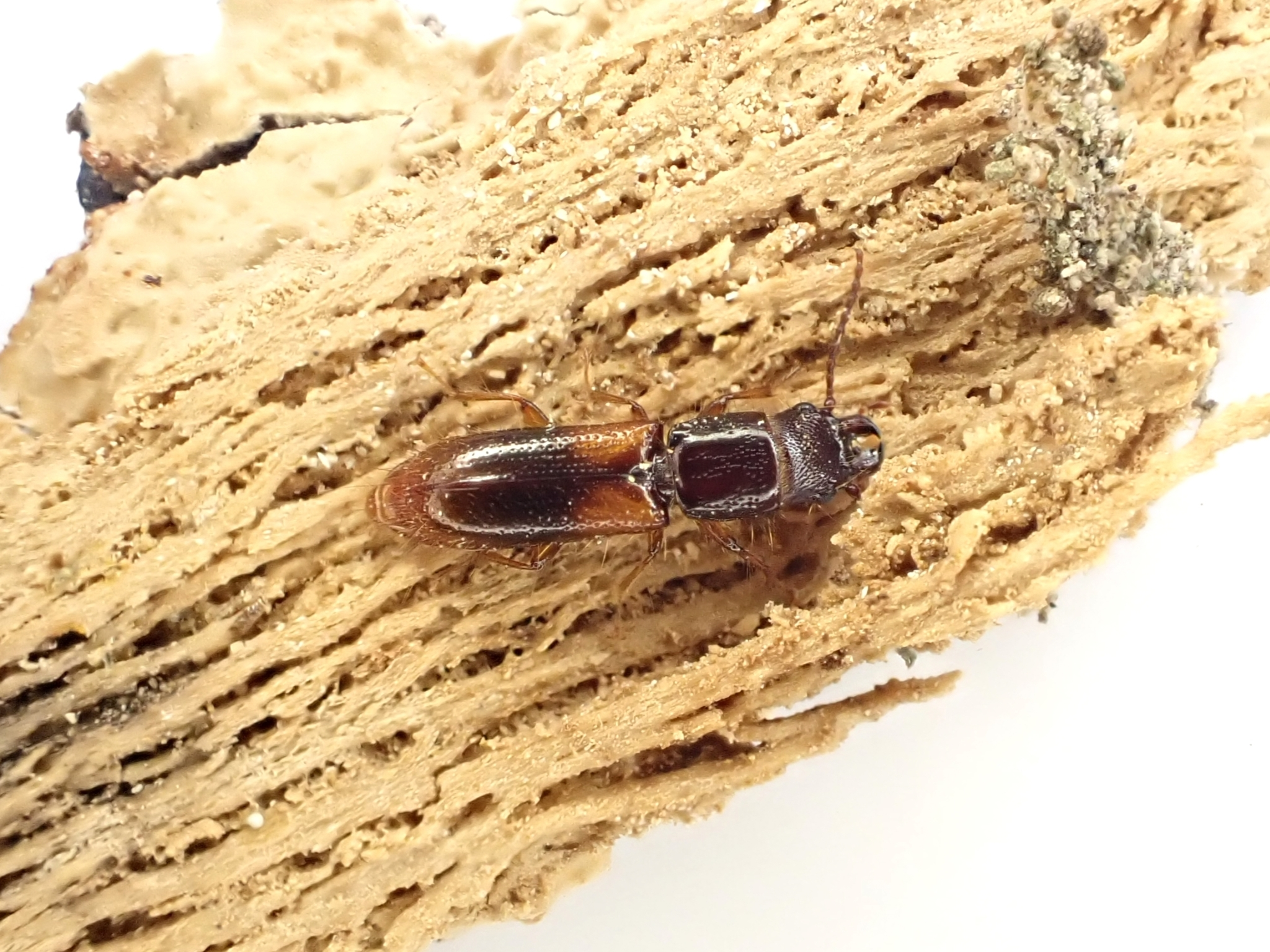
Chaetosoma scaritides

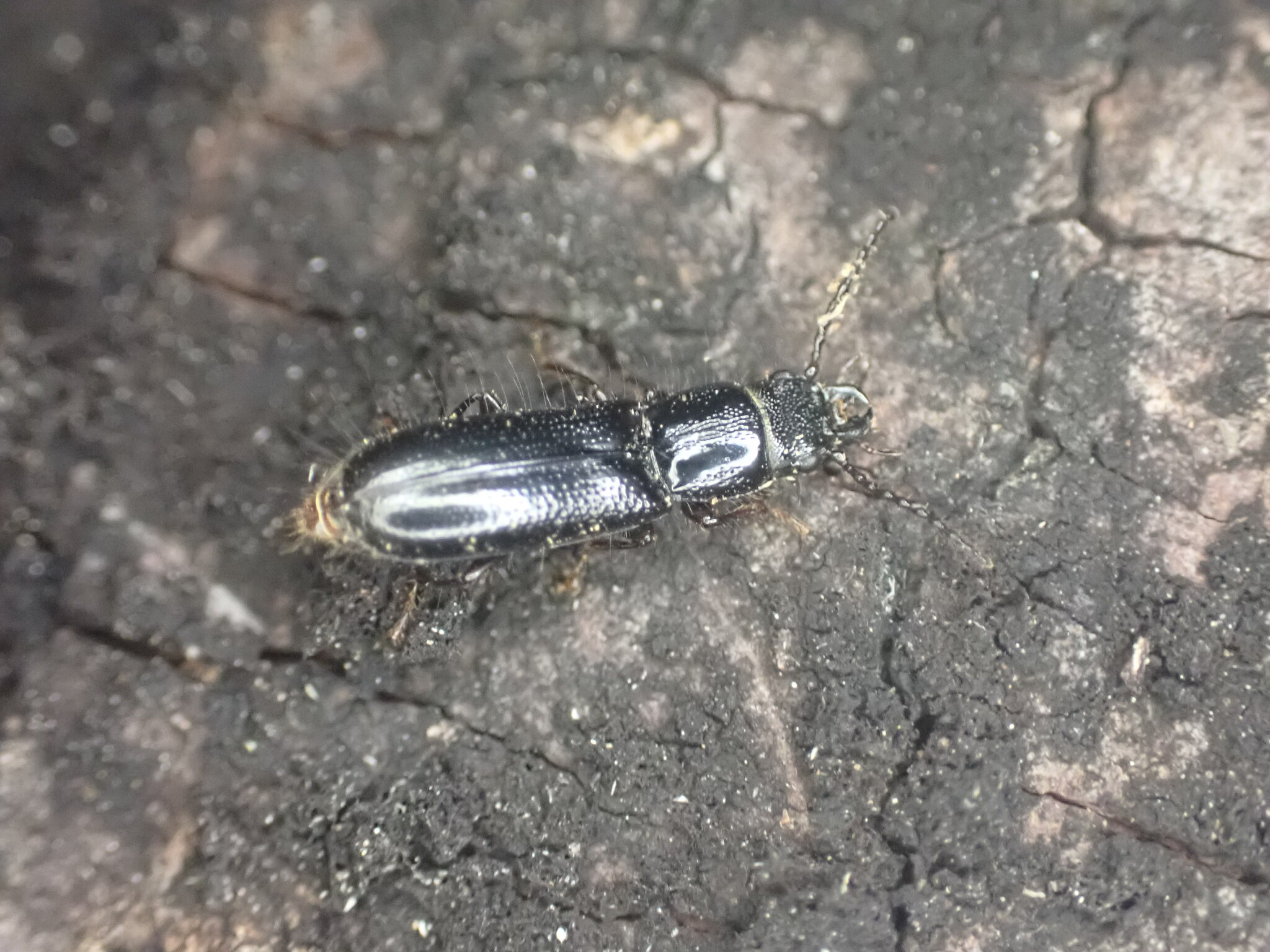
Chaetosoma colossa
