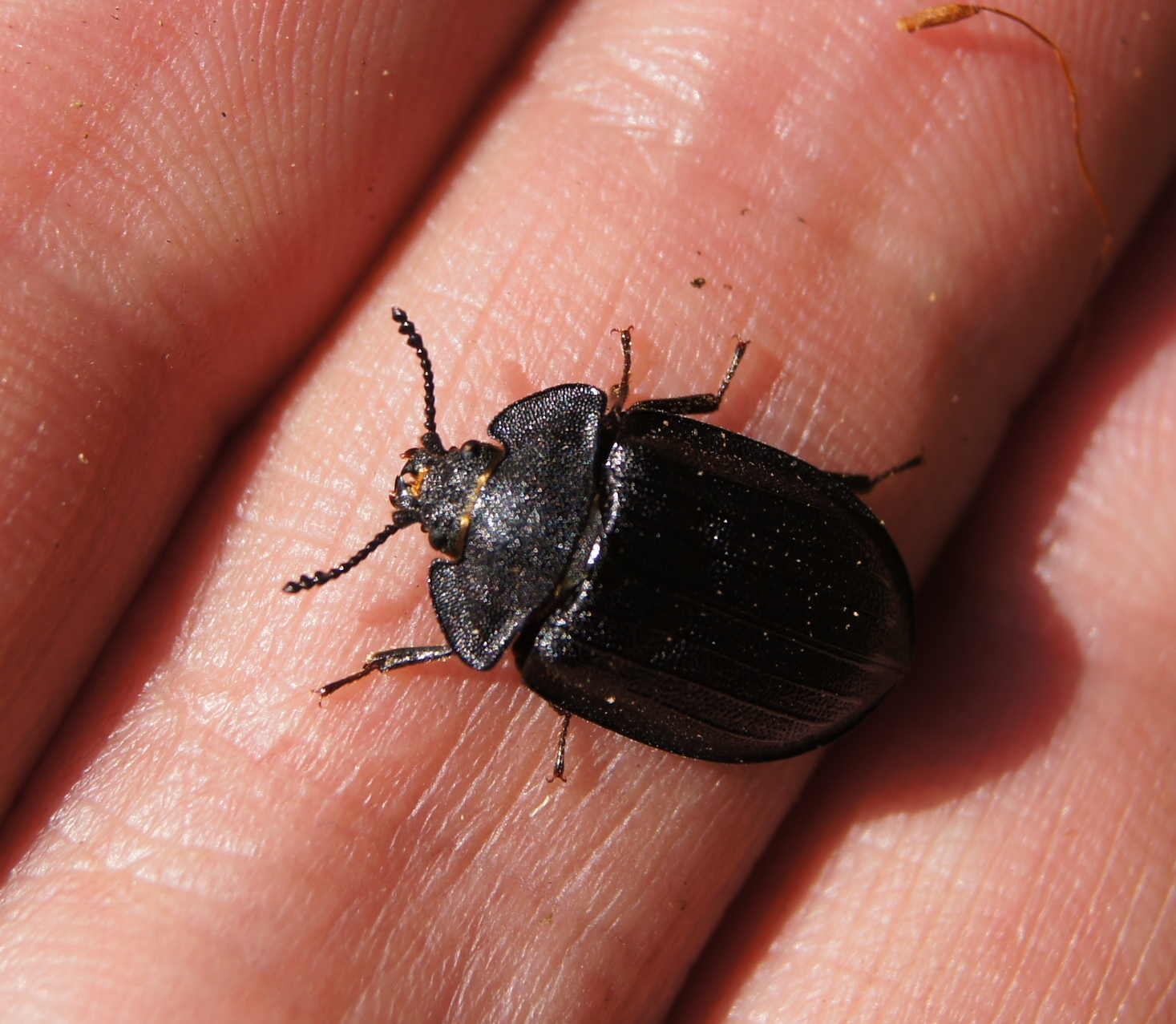
- Peltis grossa

Scientific classification
- Kingdom: Animalia
- Phylum: Arthropoda
- Class: Insecta
- Order: Coleoptera
- Suborder: Polyphaga
- Infraorder: Cucujiformia
- Superfamily: Cleroidea
- Family: Peltidae; Latreille, 1806
- Genus: Peltis; Müller, 1764

Synonyms
- Ostoma Laicharting, 1781; Gaurambe Thomson, 1859

= Peltis =

Peltis Temporal range: Eocene–Recent

Family of beetles

Peltis is a genus of beetles found in North America and Europe, and the sole extant member of the family Peltidae, formerly included in the Trogossitidae. Members of this genus are dark, averaging from brown, to dark brown, to black. They are small, wide, and flat-bodied with wide, ridged elytra. Fossil species of this genus are known from the Eocene aged Florissant Formation of the United States, as well as the Baltic amber of Europe.

Peltis larvae feed on fungal hypae growing inside rotting wood. Larvae grow for two to three years before becoming adults.

Other species considered to belong to the family include Juralithinus from the Late Jurassic Karabastau Formation of Kazakhstan, and Palaeoendomychus from the Early Cretaceous aged Laiyang Formation, China.
