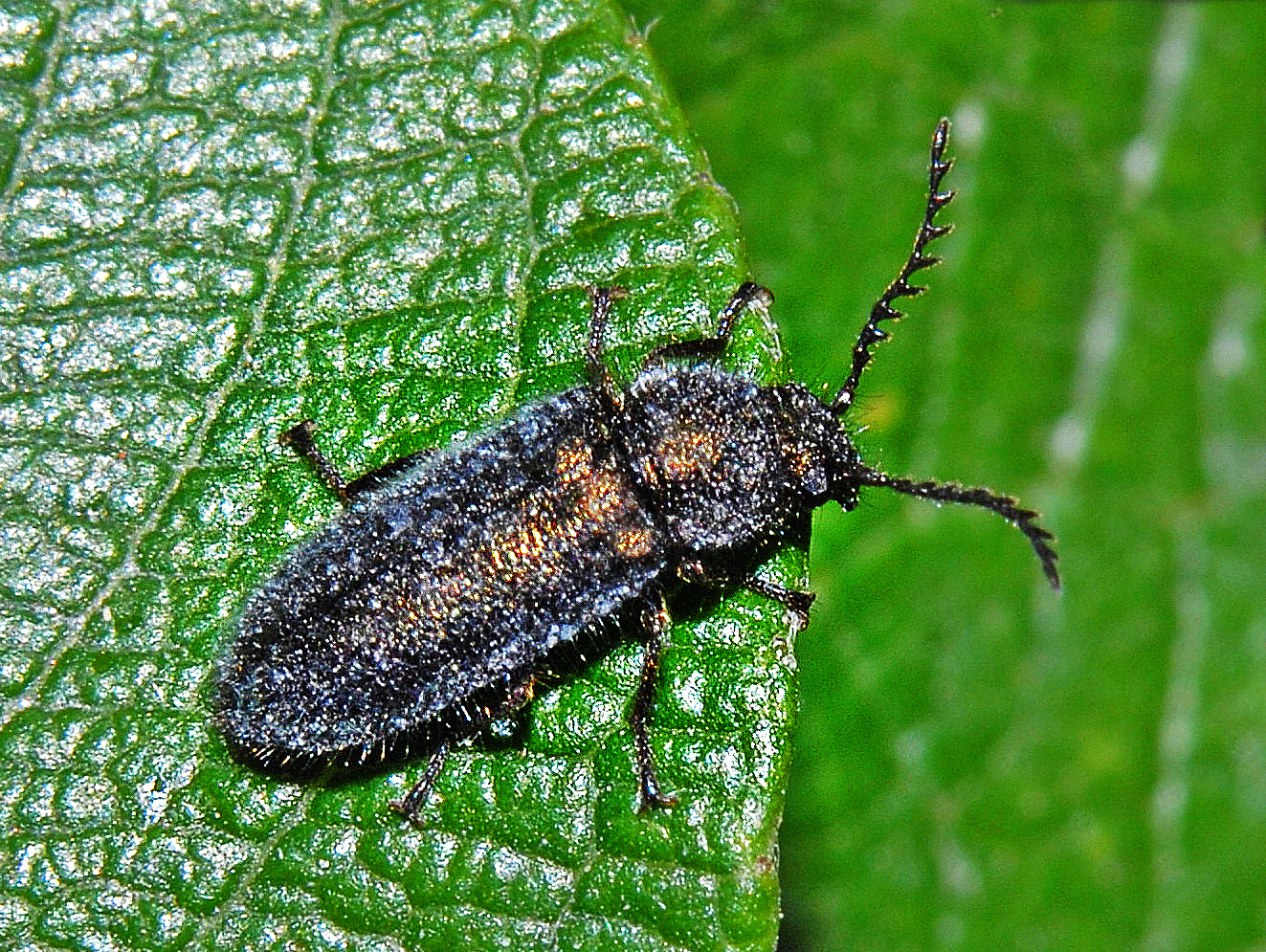
- Aplocnemus alpestris

Scientific classification
- Domain: Eukaryota
- Kingdom: Animalia
- Phylum: Arthropoda
- Class: Insecta
- Order: Coleoptera
- Suborder: Polyphaga
- Infraorder: Cucujiformia
- Family: Rhadalidae
- Genus: Aplocnemus
- Species: A. alpestris

Binomial name
- Aplocnemus alpestris Kiesenwetter, 1861

Synonyms
- Haplocnemus alpestris Kiesenwetter, 1861

= Aplocnemus alpestris =

Species of beetle

Aplocnemus alpestris is a species of soft-winged flower beetles belonging to the family Rhadalidae.

== Distribution ==
This species is present in Central and Southern Europe (Andorra, Austria, Czech Republic, France, Italy, Slovakia, Spain and Switzerland) and in the eastern Palearctic realm (southern Siberia, northeast Kazakhstan, southern Altai, Mounts Ulbinski).

== Habitat ==
These beetles especially occur in the mountainous areas of the Alps and Pyrenees, at an elevation above 1,000 metres (3,300 ft) above sea level.

== Description ==
Aplocnemus alpestris can reach a body length of about 5–6 mm (0.20–0.24 in). These soft-winged flower beetles have an elongated, cylindrical body. Pronotum and elytra have a slightly shiny black color. They are coarsely punctuated, with a long grayish pubescence. The antennae show a sexual dimorphism in their structure, as in males they are deeply serrated, while they are shallowly serrated in females.

== Biology ==
Adults can be found from July to September.
