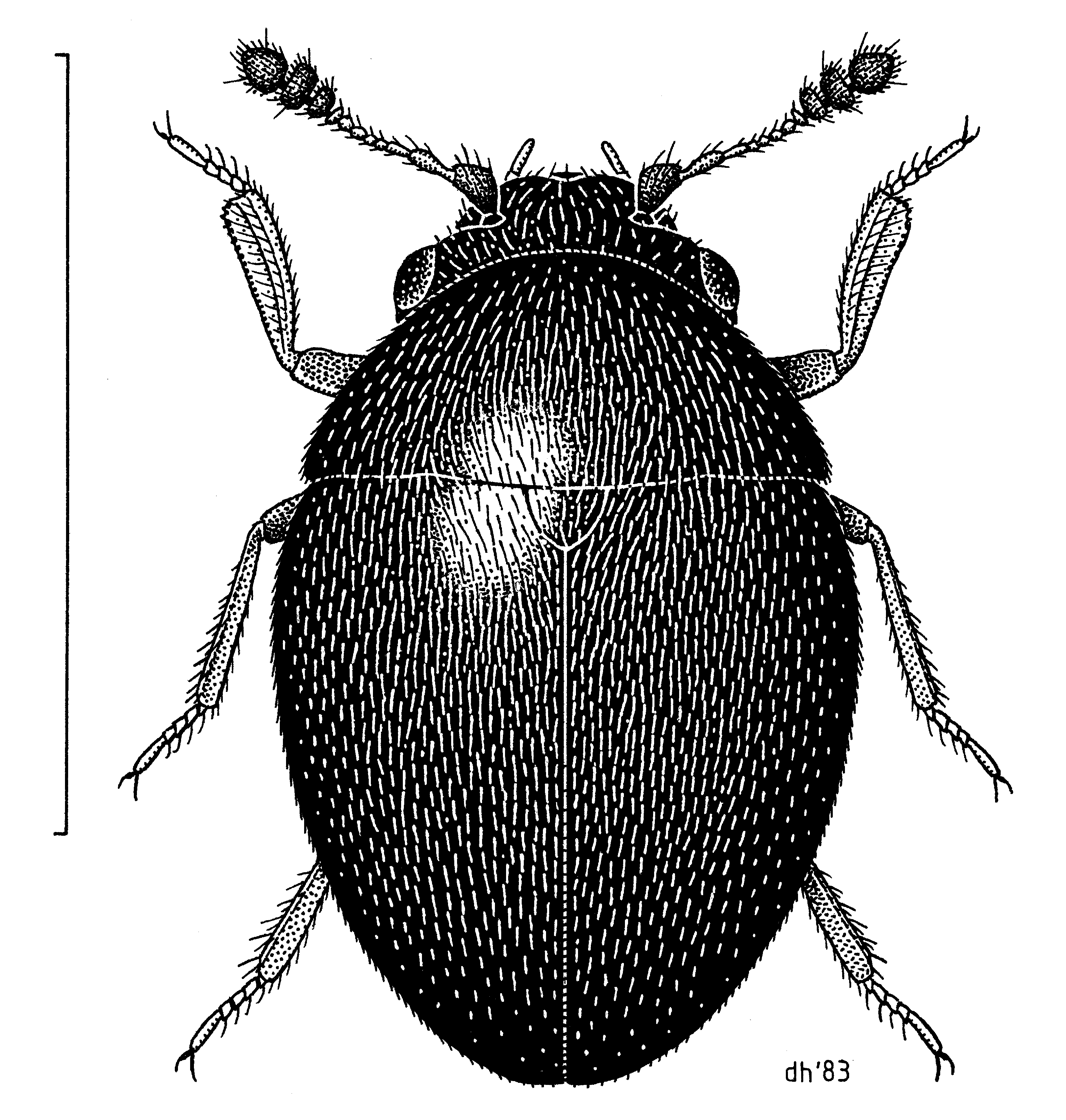
- Drawing of Rentonidium costiventris
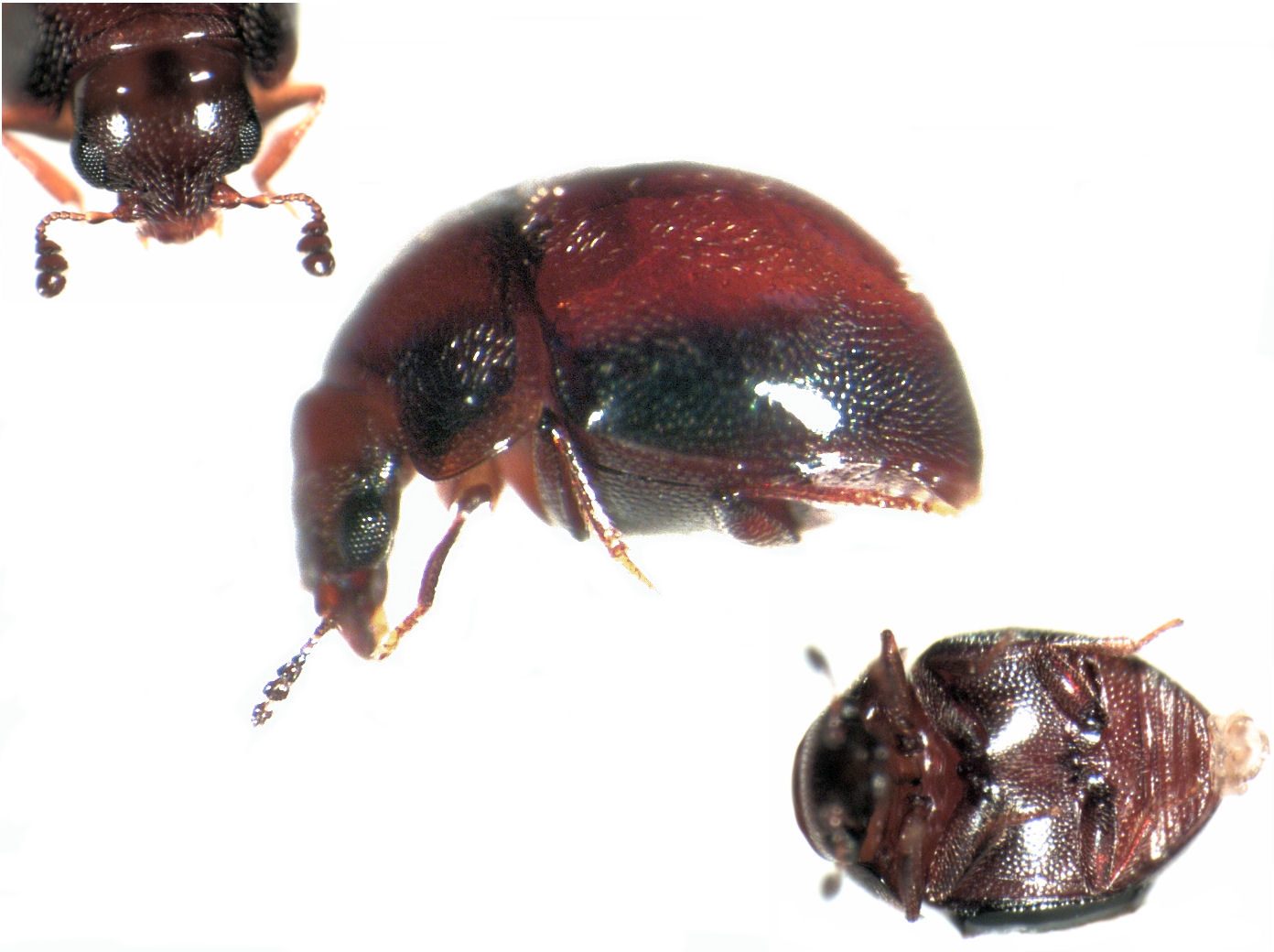
- Rentonium bicolor

Scientific classification
- Kingdom: Animalia
- Phylum: Arthropoda
- Class: Insecta
- Order: Coleoptera
- Suborder: Polyphaga
- Infraorder: Cucujiformia
- Superfamily: Cleroidea
- Family: Rentoniidae; Crowson, 1966

Genera
- See text

Synonyms
- Rentoniinae

= Rentoniidae =

Family of beetles

Rentoniidae is a family of beetles belonging to Cleroidea. The species were originally included in the family Trogossitidae. They are around 1–2 mm in length, with spherical bodies. Members of the family are native to the Southern Hemisphere, being found in Australia, New Zealand, New Caledonia and South America. They have been found on flowers, under the bark of dead trees, and in leaf litter, and members are known to be pollenivorous or fungivorous.

== Genera ==
- Australiodes Endrödy-Younga, 1960, New Zealand
- Globorentonium Lawrence & Slipinski, 2013 Australia, southern Brazil
- Parentonium Crowson, 1970 Australia
- Rentonellum Crowson, 1966 Brazil, New Zealand
- Rentonidium Crowson, 1966 New Zealand
- Rentonium Crowson, 1966 Chile, New Zealand

An undescribed species is also known from New Caledonia.
