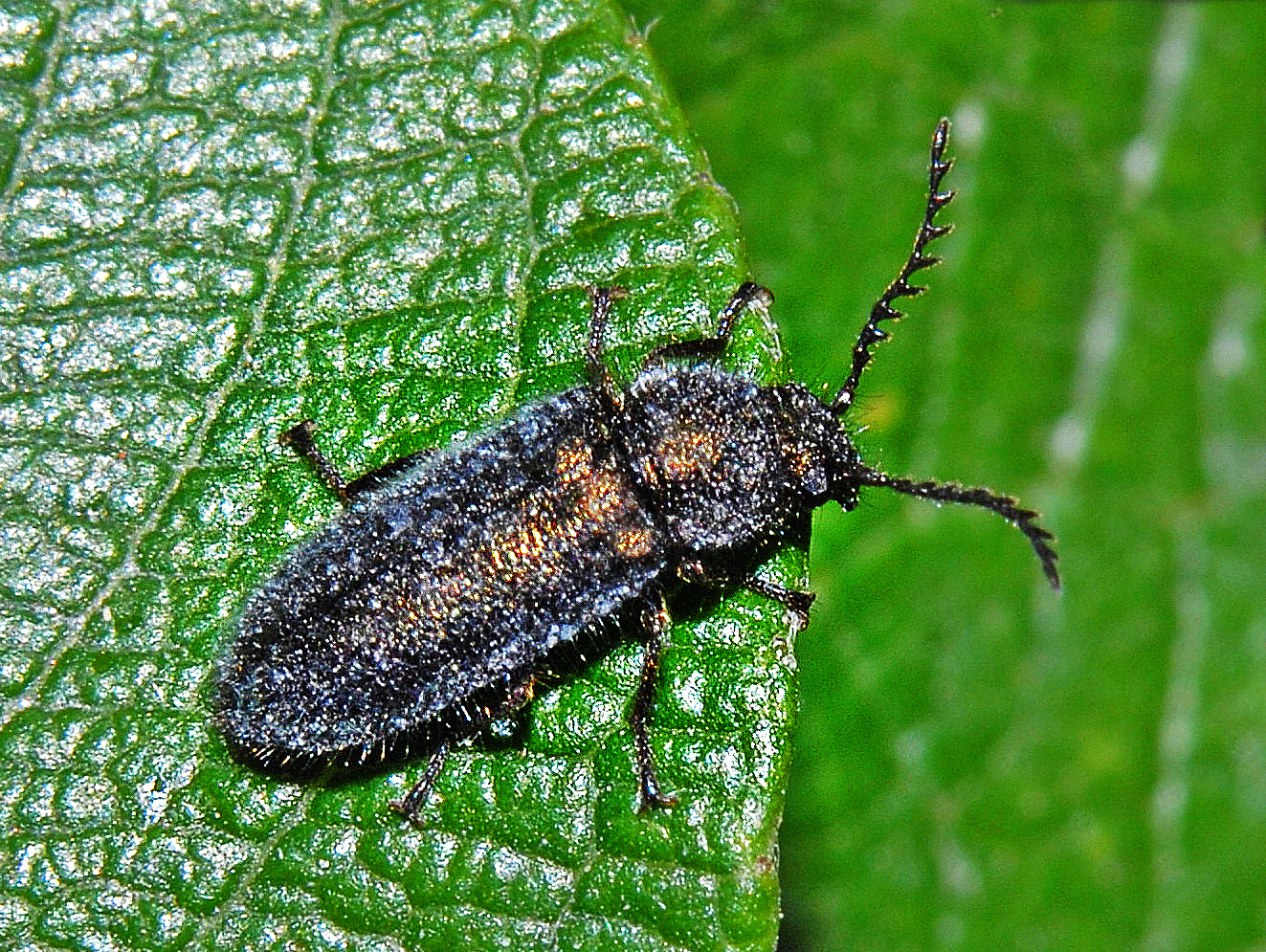
- Aplocnemus alpestris

Scientific classification
- Kingdom: Animalia
- Phylum: Arthropoda
- Clade: Pancrustacea
- Class: Insecta
- Order: Coleoptera
- Suborder: Polyphaga
- Infraorder: Cucujiformia
- Superfamily: Cleroidea
- Family: Rhadalidae; LeConte, 1861

Subfamilies
- Gietellinae; Rhadalinae

= Rhadalidae =

Family of beetles

Rhadalidae are a family of beetles of the superfamily Cleroidea, formerly treated as a subfamily within the family Melyridae. The adults are predators or feed on pollen, while the larvae are probably carnivorous.

== Distribution ==
Worldwide, except Australasia.

== Genera ==
=== Gietellinae ===
- Gietella Constantin & Menier, 1987

=== Rhadalinae ===
- Anthriboclerus Schenkling, 1922
- Antinea Peyerimhoff, 1929
- Aplocnemus Stephens, 1830
- Eucymbolus Champion, 1913
- Flavojulistus Majer, 1990
- Hemipleurus Peacock, 1987
- Indiodasytes Pic, 1916
- Jelinekius Majer, 1990
- Kubanius Majer, 1983
- Malthacodes Waterhouse, 1876
- Microcymbolus Pic, 1951
- Microjulistus Reitter, 1889
- Pelecophora Dejean, 1821
- Rhadalus Leconte, 1852
- Semijulistus Schilsky, 1894
- Trichoceble Thomson, 1859
