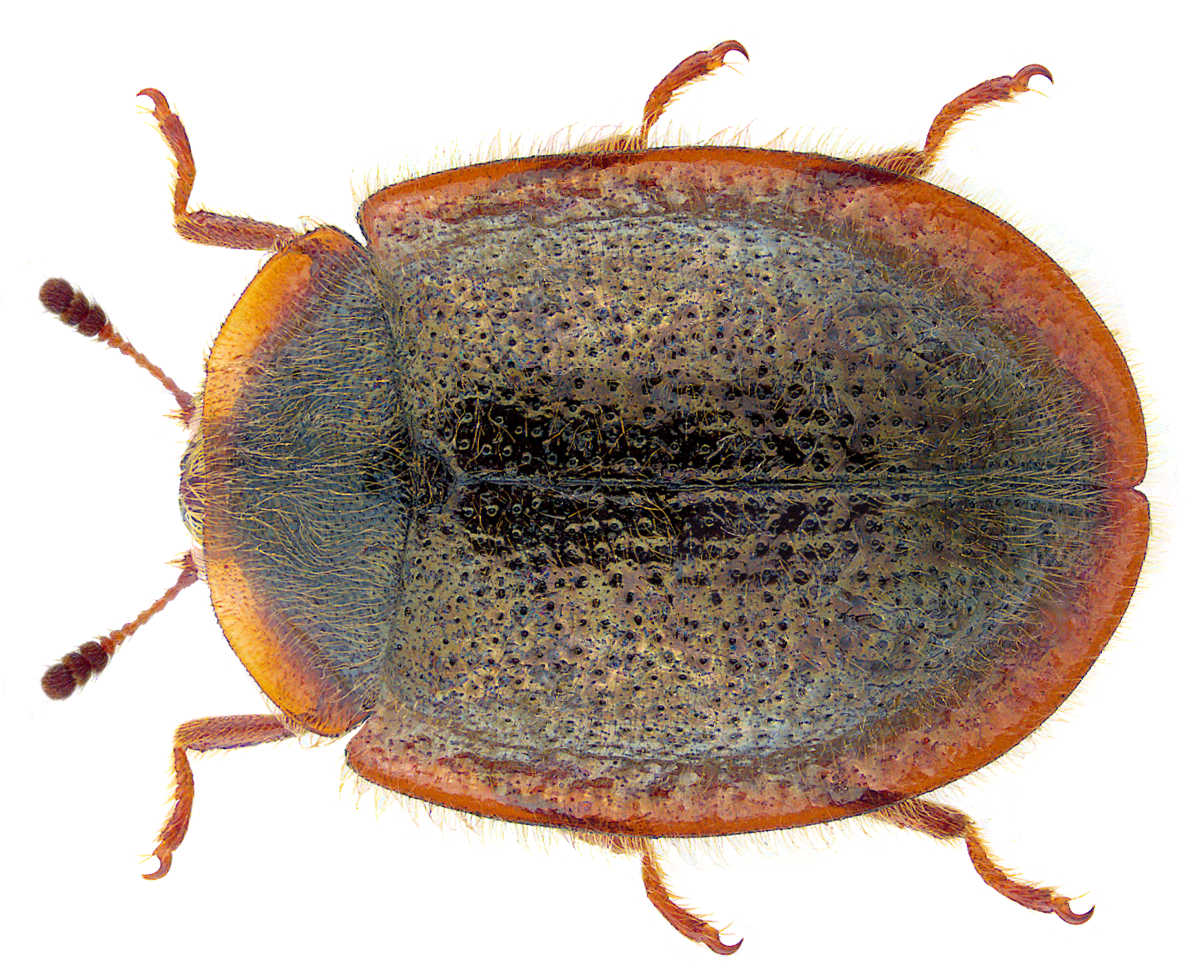
- Specimen of Thymalus limbatus
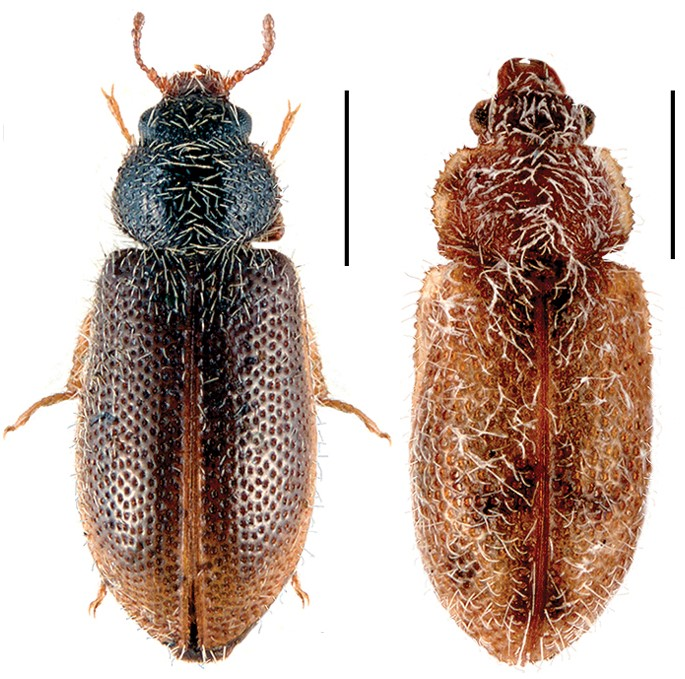
- Specimens of Decamerus haemorhoidalis (left) and Diontolobus punctatipennis (right)

Scientific classification
- Domain: Eukaryota
- Kingdom: Animalia
- Phylum: Arthropoda
- Class: Insecta
- Order: Coleoptera
- Suborder: Polyphaga
- Infraorder: Cucujiformia
- Superfamily: Cleroidea
- Family: Thymalidae; Léveillé, 1888

Subfamilies and genera
- See text

= Thymalidae =

Family of beetles

Thymalidae is a family of beetles in Cleroidea. They were formerly included in Trogossitidae. Members of the subfamily Decamerinae are found in Central and South America, and are associated with flowers, while Thymalus, the only member of the subfamily Thymalinae is found across the Holarctic realm, as well as parts of the Oriental realm, like southern China and Thailand, where they are found associated with the bark of trees. It is assumed that Thymalus larvae feed on fungus in decomposing wood.

== Genera ==
- Subfamily Decamerinae Crowson, 1964
  - Antixoon Gorham, 1886, Central America
  - Decamerus Solier, 1849 Chile
  - Diontolobus Solier, 1849, Chile
- Subfamily Thymalinae
  - Thymalus Latreille, 1802 Holarctic, Oriental Realm
