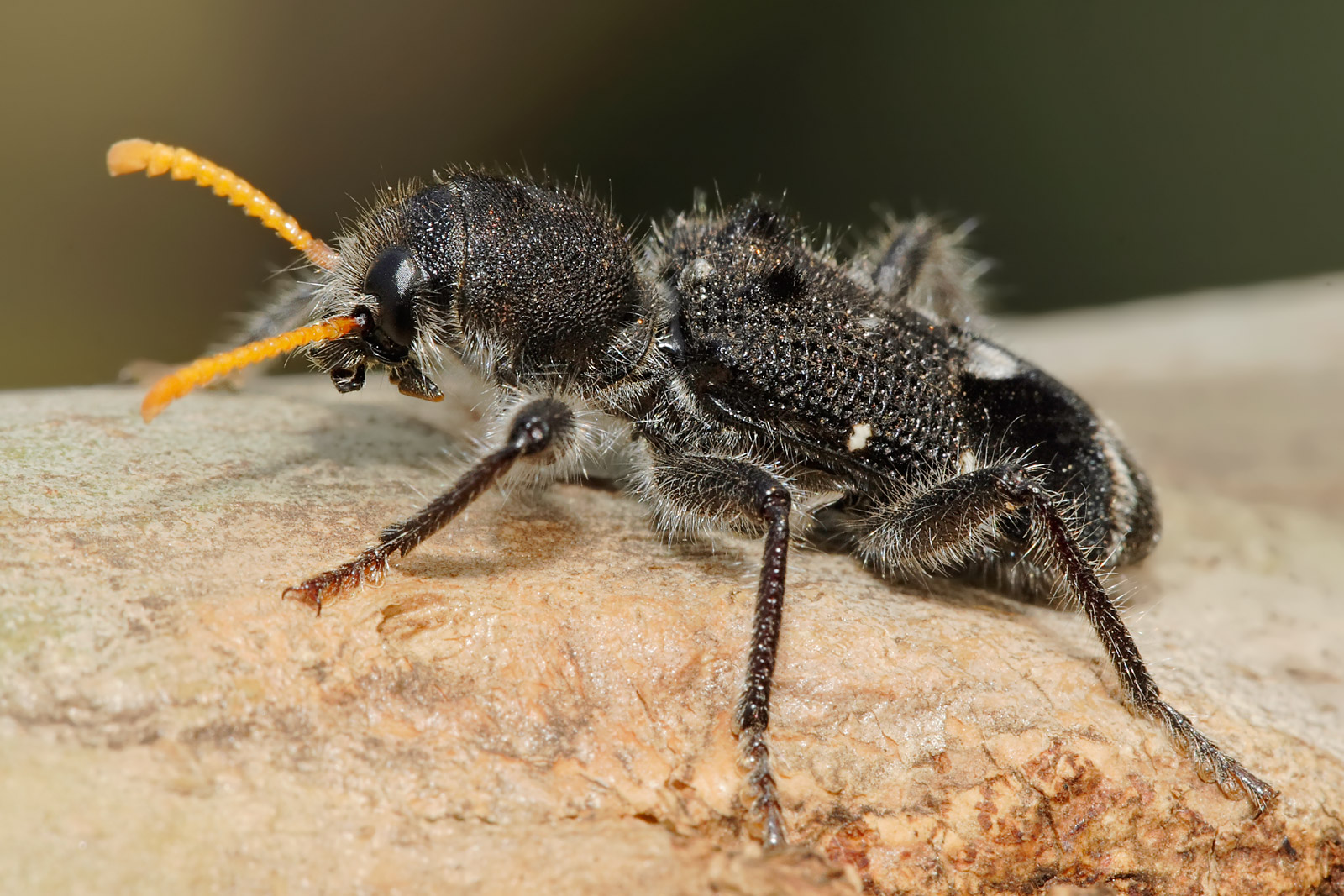
- Trogodendron fasciculatum (Cleridae)

Scientific classification
- Kingdom: Animalia
- Phylum: Arthropoda
- Clade: Pancrustacea
- Class: Insecta
- Order: Coleoptera
- Suborder: Polyphaga
- Infraorder: Cucujiformia
- Superfamily: Cleroidea; Latreille, 1802

Families
- See text.

= Cleroidea =

Cleroidea Temporal range: Jurassic–Recent

Superfamily of beetles

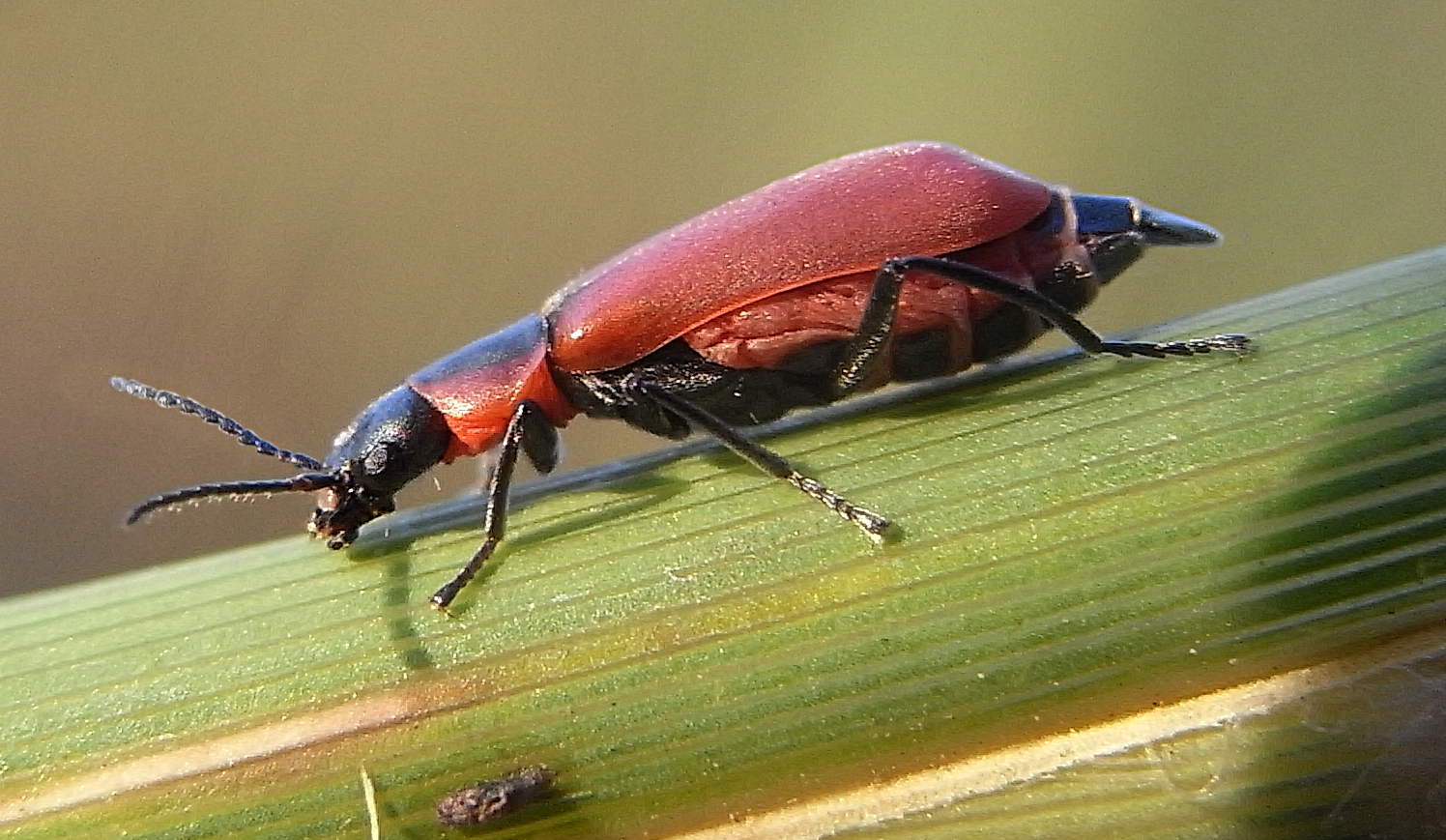
Anthocomus rufus (Melyridae)

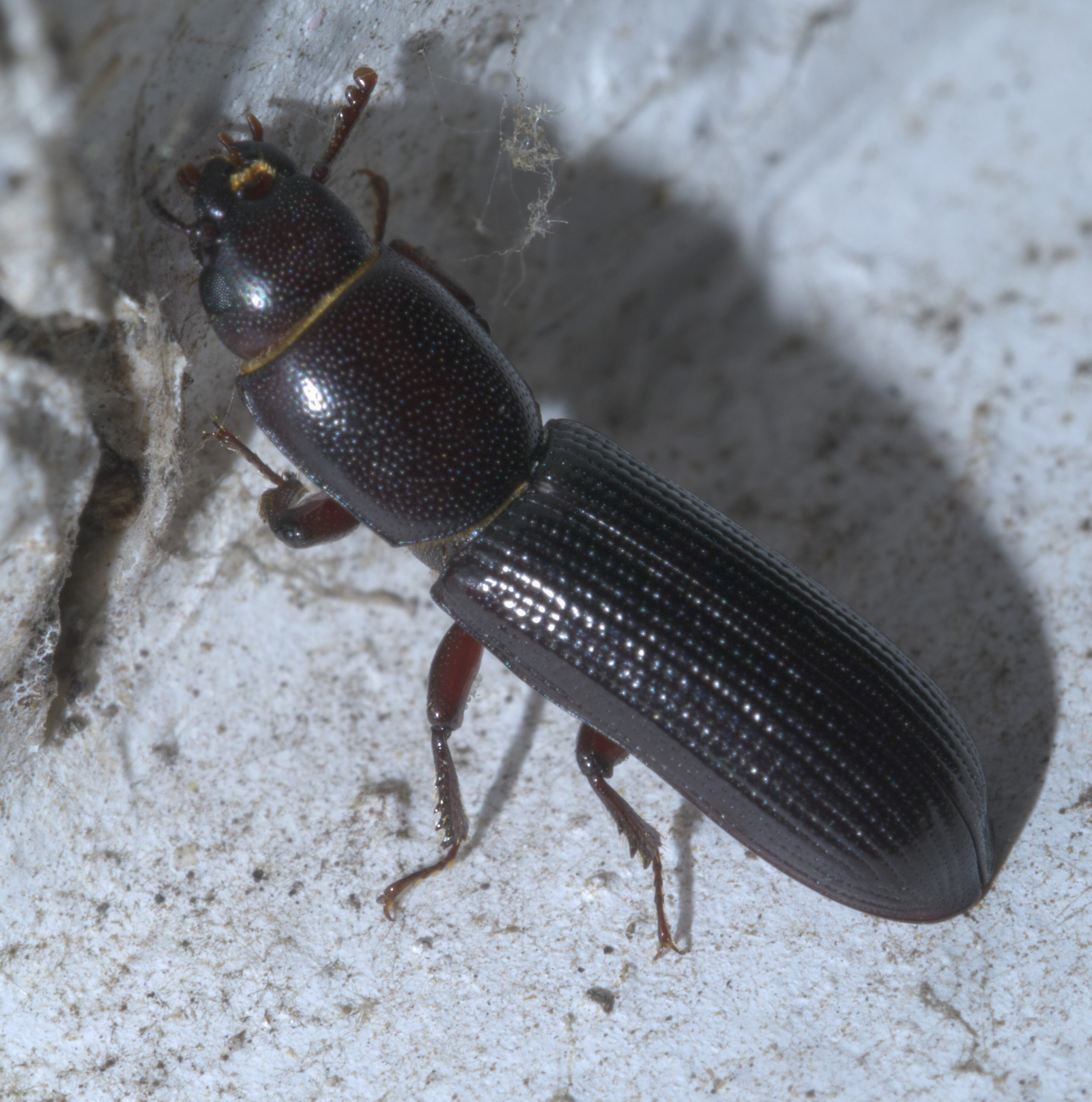
Airora cylindrica (Trogossitidae)

Cleroidea is a small superfamily of beetles containing over 10,000 species. Most of the members of the group are somewhat slender, often with fairly soft, flexible elytra, and typically hairy or scaly.

== Description ==
Cleroidea is defined by the following features: adult and larva with mandibular mola absent, larva with basal mandibular process (lacinia mobilis) present), and mala with a pedunculate seta present.

Some cleroids, especially in Cleridae and the melyrid subfamily Malachiinae, have bright aposematic colouration to deter predators. They mimic the appearances of other arthropods that are unpalatable to predators, such as various beetles (blister beetles, leaf beetles, net-winged beetles), stinging Hymenoptera (ants and velvet ants), zygaenid moths and tachinid flies.

There is variation in the degree of sclerotisation within Cleroidea. Some are hard-bodied beetles with fully sclerotised elytra that match the shape of the abdomen (Trogossitidae, Lophocateridae, Peltidae). The melyrid lineage (a group including Melyridae and other families) and the two small families Phloiophilidae and Acanthocnemidae are highly soft-bodied. The Cleridae are intermediately soft-bodied.

== Biology ==
Cleroids can be divided into three main groups based on what they feed on:

- Cleridae and most Trogossitinae (Trogossitidae) are predatory and their adults are usually diurnal.
- The melyrid lineage are pollen- or nectar-feeders, and also have diurnal adults.
- Much of the remaining Trogossitidae and many smaller families are fungus-feeders. Their adults are more cryptic and/or nocturnal than the previous two groups, occurring under bark, in rotting wood or in fruiting bodies of fungi.

Other lifestyles also occur in the superfamily. Phycosecidae scavenge dead animals on bare seashore, while Acanthocnemus nigricans (the sole species of Acanthocnemidae) is attracted to recently burnt wood.

== Taxonomy ==
Families included are:

- Acanthocnemidae Crowson, 1964
- Biphyllidae LeConte, 1861
- †Boleopsidae Kirejtshuk & Nel, 2013
- Byturidae Gistel, 1848
- Chaetosomatidae Crowson, 1952 (incl. Metaxinidae)
- Cleridae Latreille, 1802 (checkered beetles)
- Lophocateridae Crowson, 1964
- Mauroniscidae Majer, 1995
- Melyridae Leach, 1815 (soft-winged flower beetles) (including the former Attalomimidae, Malachiidae and Dasytidae)
- Peltidae Latreille, 1806
- Phloiophilidae Kiesenwetter, 1863
- Phycosecidae Crowson, 1952
- Prionoceridae Lacordaire, 1857
- Protopeltidae Crowson, 1966
- Rentoniidae Crowson, 1966
- Rhadalidae LeConte, 1861 (incl. Gietellidae)
- Thanerocleridae Chapin, 1924
- Thymalidae Léveillé, 1888
- Trogossitidae Latreille, 1802 (bark-gnawing beetles)

The melyrid lineage consists of Phycosecidae, Rhadalidae, Mauroniscidae, Prionoceridae and Melyridae.

Most species belong to the families Cleridae and Melyridae, followed by Trogossitidae.

=== Extinct genera ===
- †Juraniscus Kolibáč and Huang, 2019 - found in Daohugou, China in Middle Jurassic deposit, considered part of the melyrid lineage
