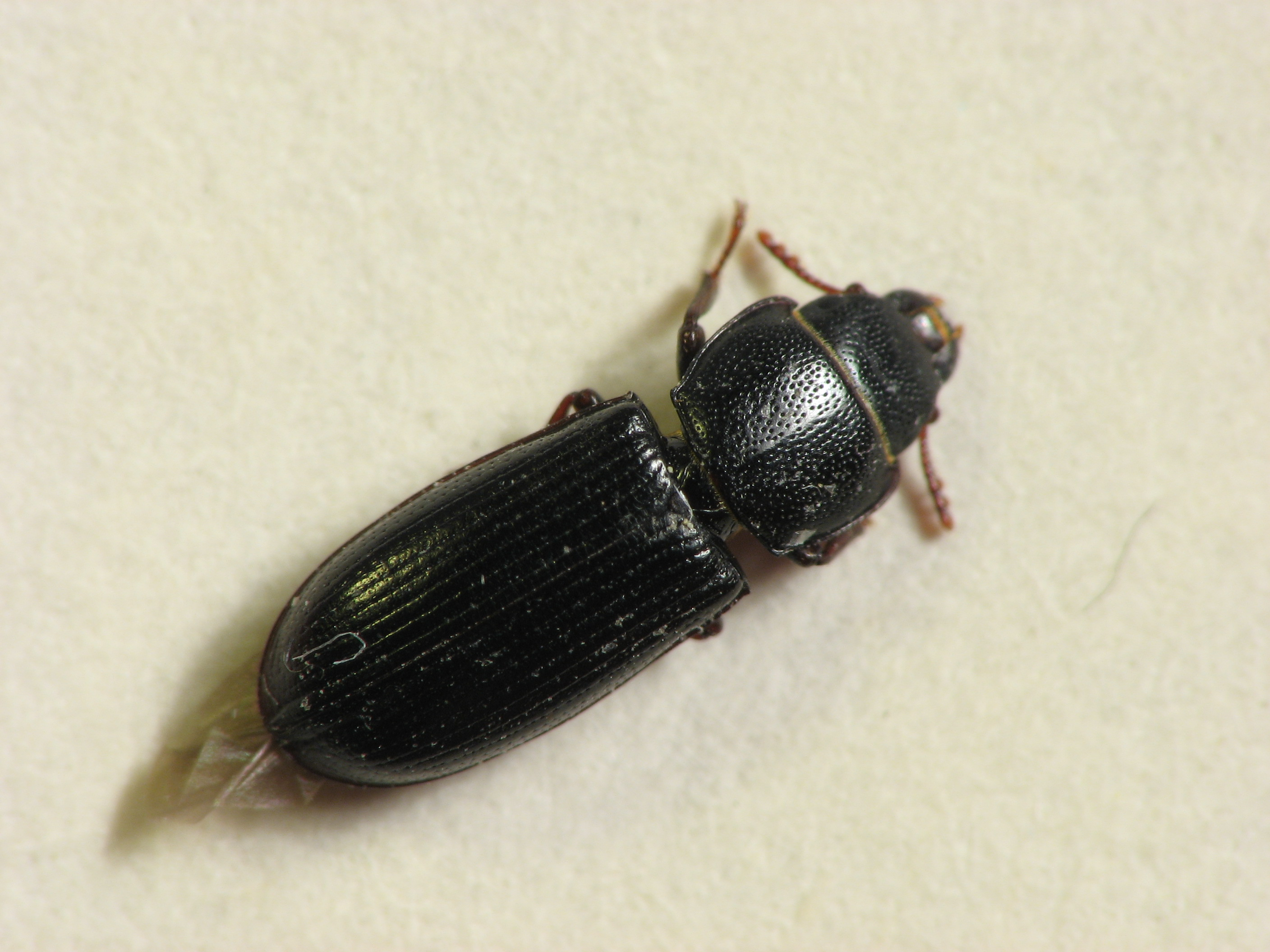
- Tenebroides corticalis

Scientific classification
- Kingdom: Animalia
- Phylum: Arthropoda
- Class: Insecta
- Order: Coleoptera
- Suborder: Polyphaga
- Infraorder: Cucujiformia
- Family: Trogossitidae
- Subfamily: Trogossitinae
- Tribe: Trogossitini; Latreille, 1802

Type genus
- Trogossita Olivier, 1790

= Trogossitini =

Tribe of beetles

Trogossitini is a tribe of beetles in the subfamily Trogossitinae.

== Genera ==
Airora - Alindria - Corticotomus - Dupontiella - Elestora - Eupycnus - Euschaefferia - Leipaspis - Melambia - Nemozoma - Parallelodera - Seidlitzella - Temnoscheila - Tenebroides - †Cretocateres - †Thoracotes
