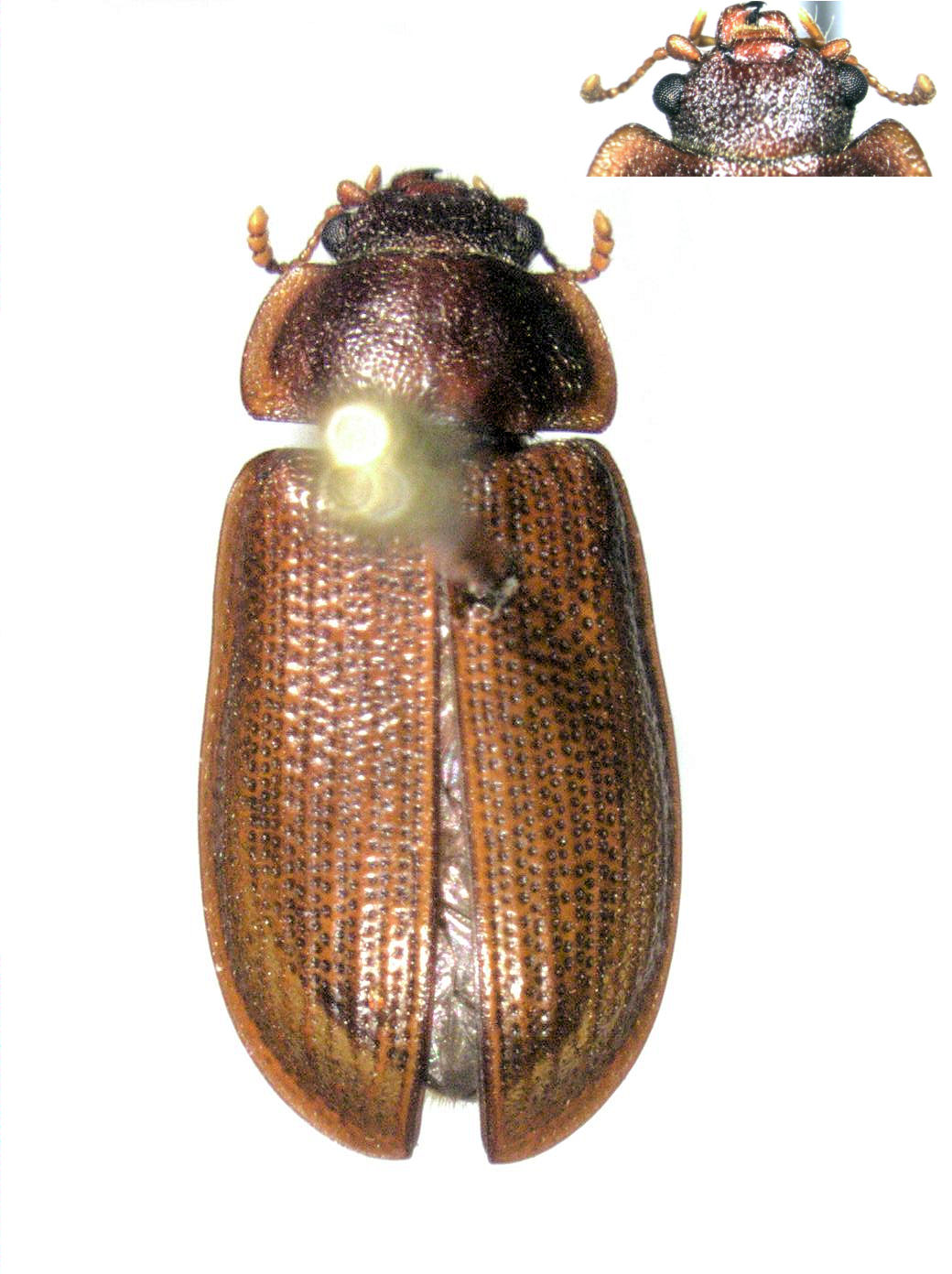

Scientific classification
- Kingdom: Animalia
- Phylum: Arthropoda
- Clade: Pancrustacea
- Class: Insecta
- Order: Coleoptera
- Suborder: Polyphaga
- Infraorder: Cucujiformia
- Family: Lophocateridae
- Genus: Promanus
- Species: P. depressus

Binomial name
- Promanus depressus Sharp, 1877

= Promanus depressus =

Species of beetle

Promanus depressus is a species of beetles of the family Lophocateridae, endemic to New Zealand.
