= Gymnochilini =

Scientific classification
- Kingdom: Animalia
- Phylum: Arthropoda
- Clade: Pancrustacea
- Class: Insecta
- Order: Coleoptera
- Suborder: Polyphaga
- Infraorder: Cucujiformia
- Family: Trogossitidae
- Subfamily: Trogossitinae
- Tribe: Gymnochilini; Lacordaire, 1854

Type genus
- Gymnochila Klug, in Erichson, 1844

Genera
- Anacypta; Gymnochila; Kolibacia; Leperina; Narcisa; Phanodesta; Xenoglena

Tribe of beetles

Gymnochilini is a tribe of beetles in the subfamily Trogossitinae.
