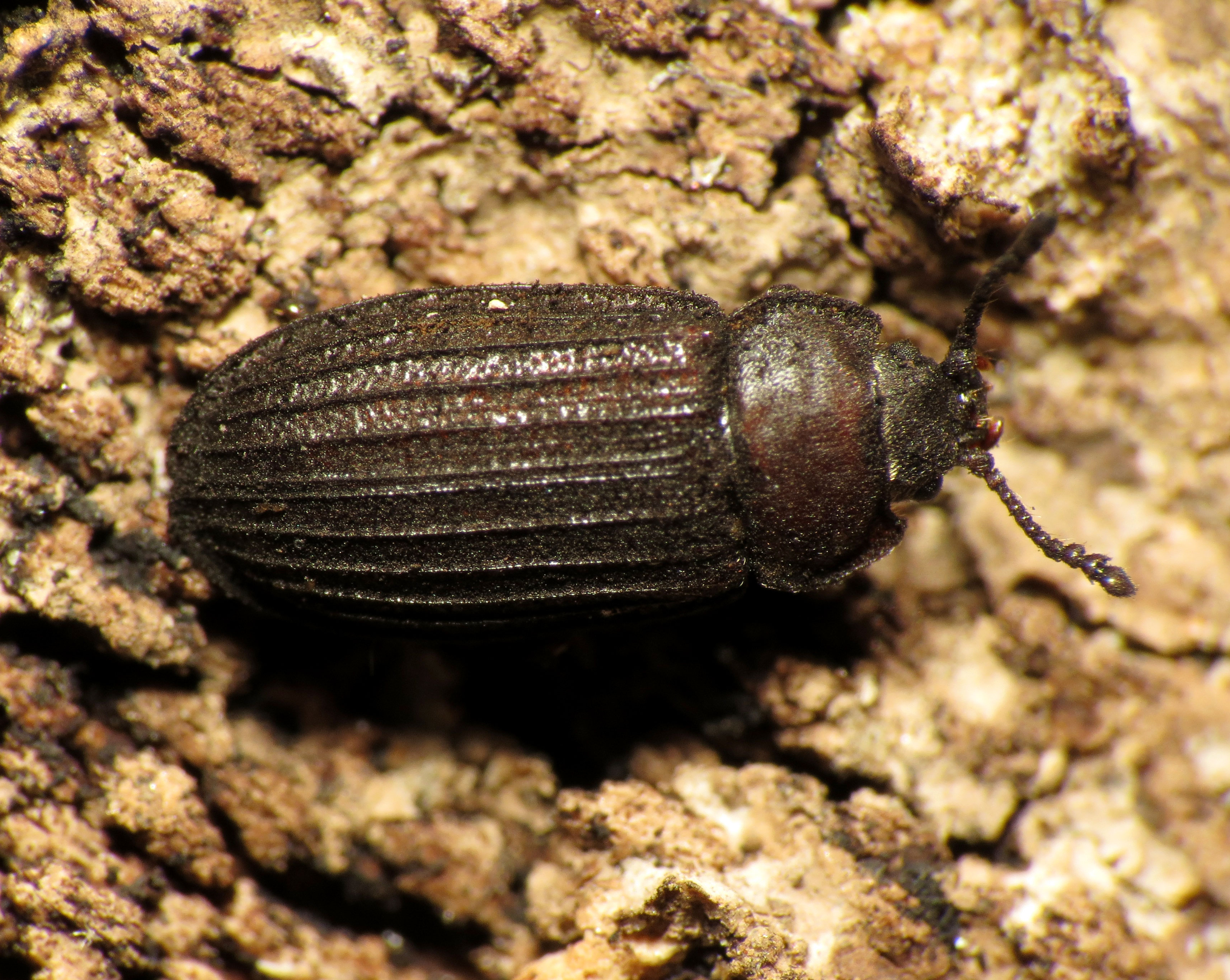
- Grynocharis quadrilineata

Scientific classification
- Domain: Eukaryota
- Kingdom: Animalia
- Phylum: Arthropoda
- Class: Insecta
- Order: Coleoptera
- Suborder: Polyphaga
- Infraorder: Cucujiformia
- Superfamily: Cleroidea
- Family: Lophocateridae
- Genus: Grynocharis; Thomson, 1859

= Grynocharis =

Genus of beetles

Grynocharis is a genus of bark-gnawing beetles in the family Lophocateridae. There are at least four described species in Grynocharis.

== Species ==
- Grynocharis oblonga (Linnaeus, 1758) (Europe)
- Grynocharis oregonensis (C.Schaeffer, 1918) (North America)
- Grynocharis pubescens (Erichson, 1844)
- Grynocharis quadrilineata (Melsheimer, 1844) (North America)
