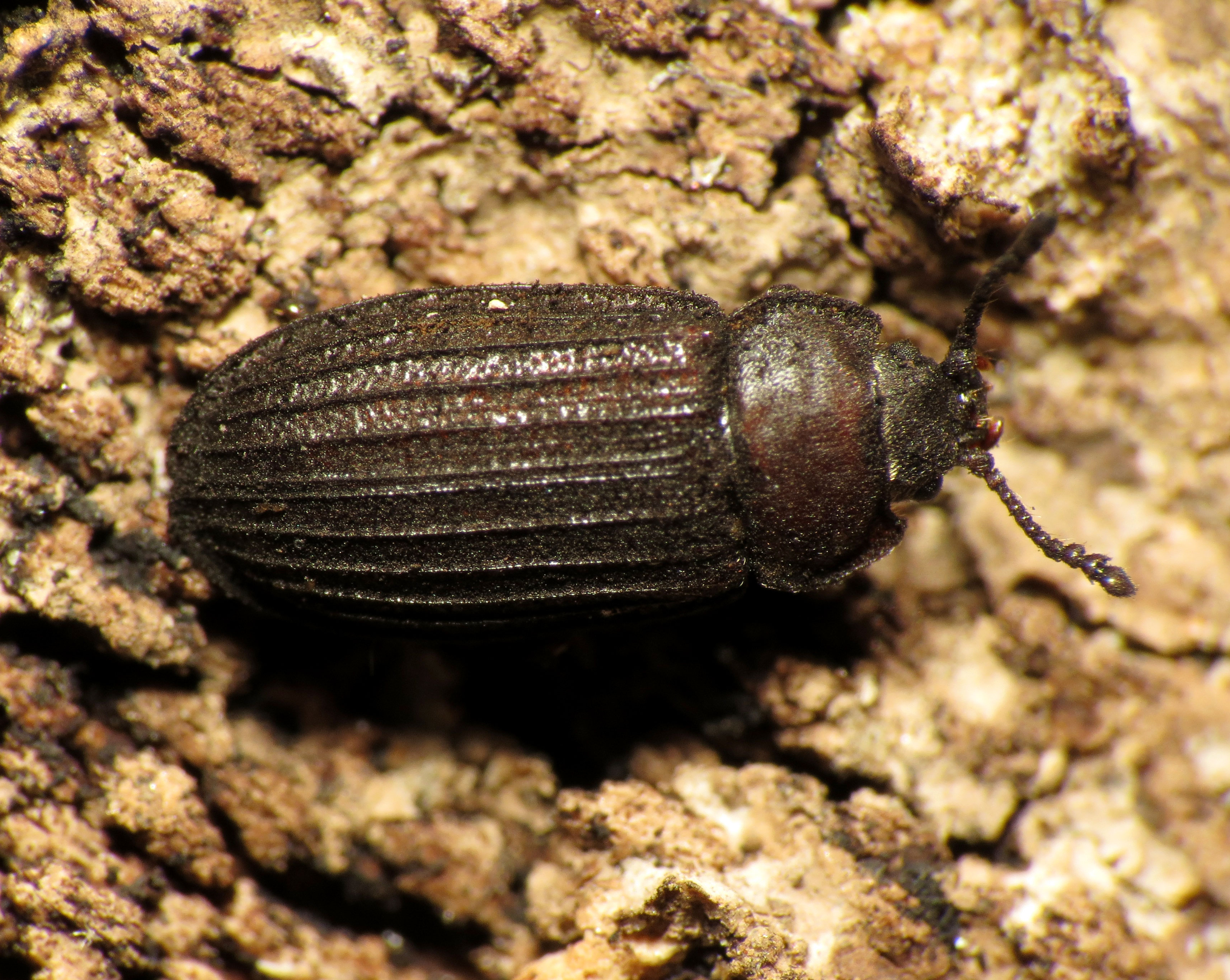

Scientific classification
- Domain: Eukaryota
- Kingdom: Animalia
- Phylum: Arthropoda
- Class: Insecta
- Order: Coleoptera
- Suborder: Polyphaga
- Infraorder: Cucujiformia
- Superfamily: Cleroidea
- Family: Lophocateridae
- Genus: Grynocharis
- Species: G. quadrilineata

Binomial name
- Grynocharis quadrilineata (Melsheimer, 1844)

= Grynocharis quadrilineata =

Species of beetles

Grynocharis quadrilineata is a species of bark-gnawing beetle in the family Lophocateridae, found in the northeastern United States and southeastern Canada.
