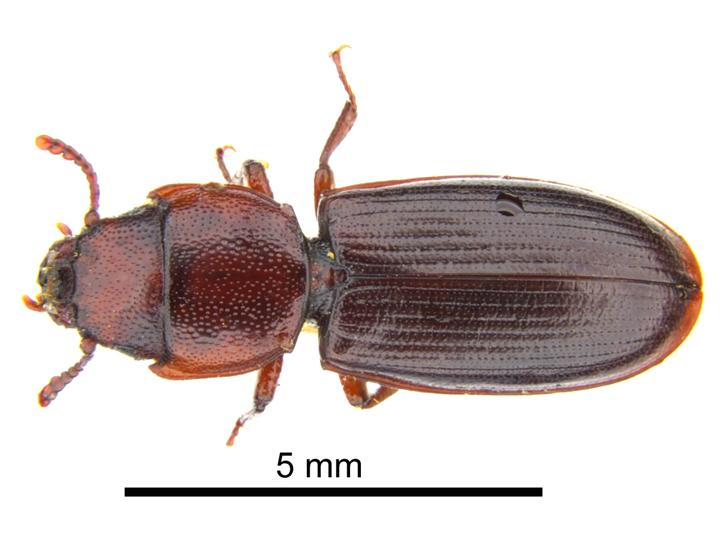

Scientific classification
- Kingdom: Animalia
- Phylum: Arthropoda
- Class: Insecta
- Order: Coleoptera
- Suborder: Polyphaga
- Infraorder: Cucujiformia
- Family: Trogossitidae
- Genus: Tenebroides
- Species: T. mauritanicus

Binomial name
- Tenebroides mauritanicus (Linnaeus, 1758)

Synonyms
- Carabus bucephalus Herbst, 1784; Lucanus dubius Scriba, 1790; Lucanus fuscus Preyssler, 1790; Tenebroides piceus Dalla Torre, 1879; Platycerus striatus Geoffroy, 1785; Tenebrio caraboides Linnaeus, 1758; Tenebrio mauritanicus L., 1758; Tenebroides complanatus Piller & Mitterpacher, 1783; Trogosita mauritanica (L. 1758); Trogosita nitidus Horn, 1862

= Tenebroides mauritanicus =

Species of beetle

Tenebroides mauritanicus, commonly known as the cadelle, is a species of beetle in the family Trogossitidae. It is a common cosmopolitan pest in storehouses and granaries.

== Taxonomy and nomenclature ==
Tenebroides mauritanicus was first described in 1758 by Linnaeus in his 10th edition of Systema Naturae, who named it Tenebrio mauritanicus and classified it with the mealworms. A few decades later in 1790, the French entomologist Guillaume-Antoine Olivier proposed for it the generic name of Trogossite. For many years thereafter, the beetle was known as Trogosita mauritanica and was included in the family of beetles known as the Trogositidae.

In 1783, a specimen described under the name of Tenebroides complantus was recognised as Linnaeus’s original specimen of Tenebrio mauritanicus, leading to the proposal of the current name of Tenebroides mauritanicus.

The widely accepted common name cadelle comes from the French vernacular, and in its modern meaning refers to both adults and larvae.

The specific epithet mauritanicus means Mauritanian, in reference to the species’ supposed African origin.

The larvae were nicknamed "bargemen" by sailors because they often infested ships' biscuits and were noticed when they crawled out of the biscuits and onto the "barge", a small tub used to hold biscuits on the mess table.

== Distribution and habitat ==
Having probably originated in North Africa, the cadelle has now spread through human agency to most other parts of the world in exported grain products and dunnage. It probably first spread to Europe in Roman times. Although primarily synanthropic, it is less commonly found in wild habitats

== Identification ==
Resembling a carabid, the cadelle is a rather large beetle with a slightly flattened, elongated body, measuring 6 – 12 mm in length. The larvae can measure up to 20 mm long. The body is shiny black or dark brown with reddish brown legs and antennae. The head is very large with broad temples behind almost flattened eyes. The head and pronotum are coarsely punctured. There is also deep neck between the head and elytra, and the prominent sharp claws are adapted for biting.

== Natural history and lifecycle ==
A female can lay about 1000 eggs in her lifetime but typically lays eggs in groups of about 50, loosely placed among food products. These hatch in about 10 days, depending on ambient temperature.

The larvae feed on a variety of stored foods such as nuts, grains, and dried fruit. As they develop, the juveniles begin to take live animal prey. Meanwhile, the adults are exclusively carnivorous, feeding on other insects such as Tribolium (flour beetles) and Rhyzopertha (false powderpost beetles). Sometimes, adults will eat other adults of their own species.

This species can go for long periods without food, over 50 days for adults and over 120 days for larvae.

== Pest status and control ==
Among the Trogossitidae, the cadelle is the only species to infest stored grain and food products. In general, the larvae only eat the soft parts of grains such as wheat and oats, so they can be very destructive. Adults, with their sharp claws, can gnaw holes in packaging, exposing foods to attack by other pest species. They can also bore into wood, typically pupating in the wood cavities they make.
