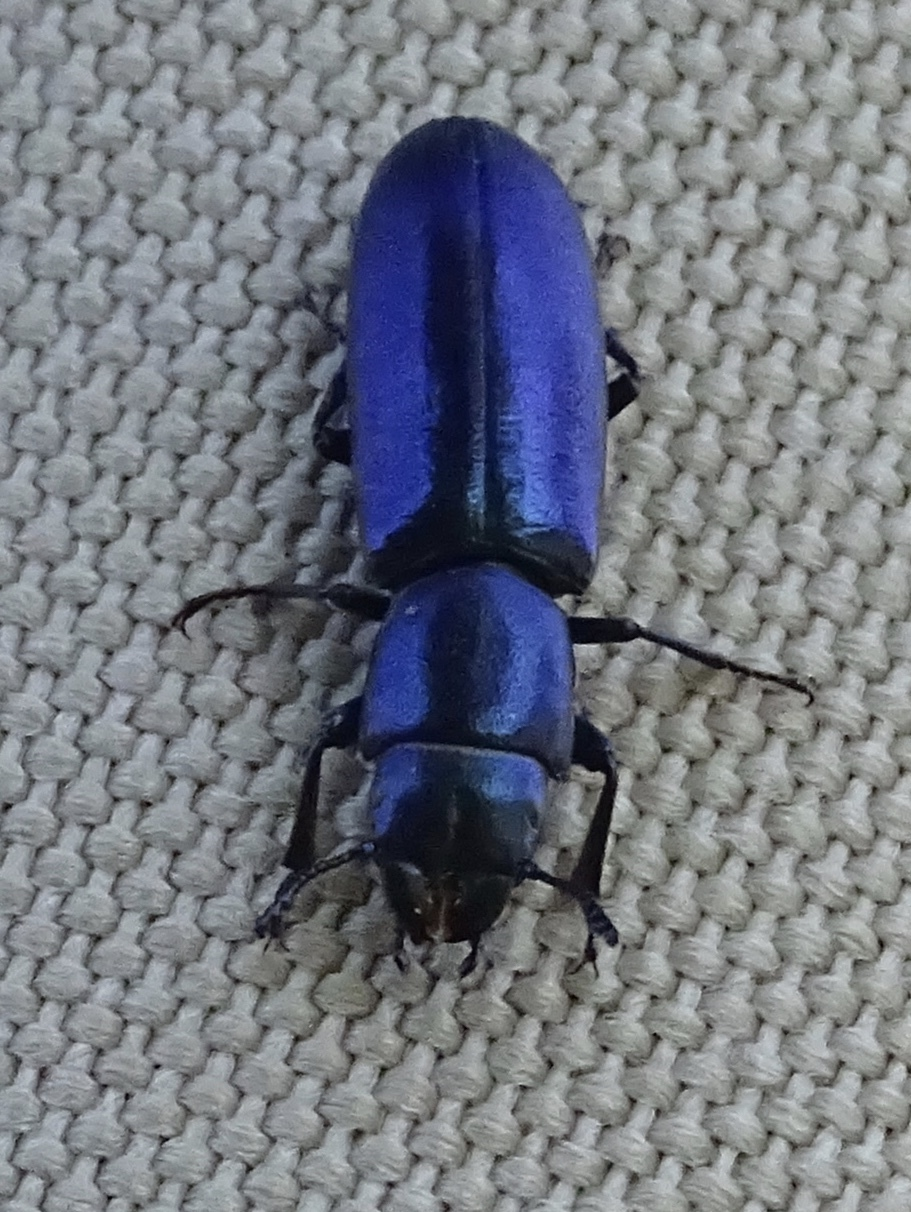

Scientific classification
- Domain: Eukaryota
- Kingdom: Animalia
- Phylum: Arthropoda
- Class: Insecta
- Order: Coleoptera
- Suborder: Polyphaga
- Infraorder: Cucujiformia
- Family: Trogossitidae
- Genus: Temnoscheila
- Species: T. chlorodia

Binomial name
- Temnoscheila chlorodia (Mannerheim 1843)

= Temnoscheila chlorodia =

Species of insect

Temnoscheila chlorodia, also called the green bark-gnawing beetle or green bark beetle, is a species of bark-gnawing beetle. It is found in North America west of the Great Plains.

== Description ==
Adults are dark metallic green or blue and 9–20 mm in length. Larvae are pink or white with a dark head and thoracic shield and an anal plate with two spurs.

== Behavior ==
Adults and larvae alike are predators that forage under the bark of dead trees. They can also be found in the nests of other wood-boring insects and in wood-decay fungus. Adults are most abundant during late spring, with a second peak in late summer.
