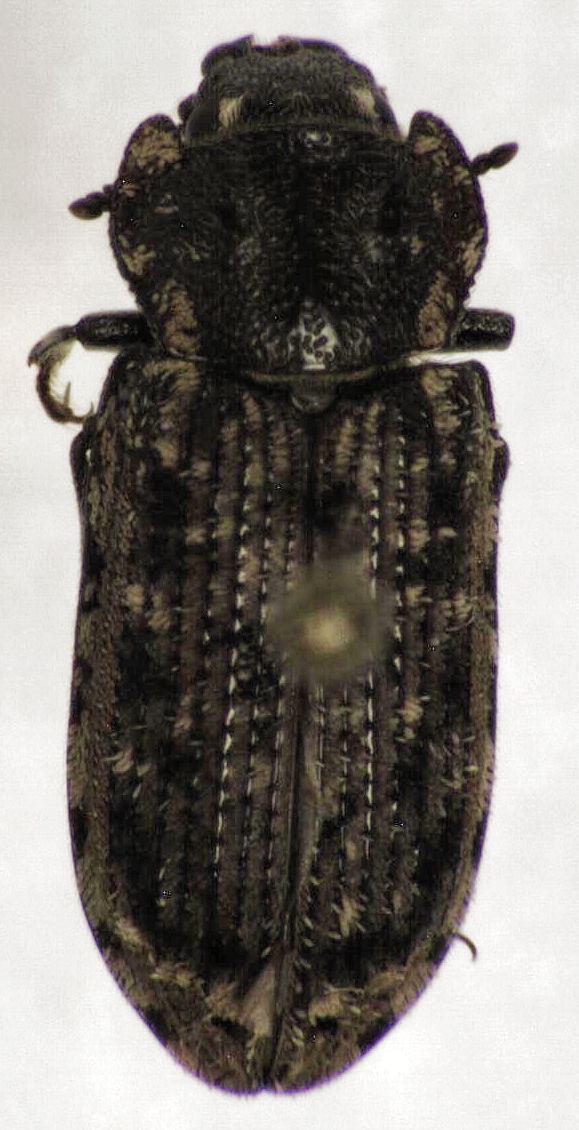

Scientific classification
- Kingdom: Animalia
- Phylum: Arthropoda
- Clade: Pancrustacea
- Class: Insecta
- Order: Coleoptera
- Suborder: Polyphaga
- Infraorder: Cucujiformia
- Family: Trogossitidae
- Genus: Phanodesta
- Species: P. wakefieldi

Binomial name
- Phanodesta wakefieldi (Sharp, 1877)

= Phanodesta wakefieldi =

Species of beetle

Phanodesta wakefieldi is a beetle of the family Trogossitidae, endemic to New Zealand. It was originally named Leperina wakefieldi, and has also been referred to as Lepidopteryx wakefieldi.
