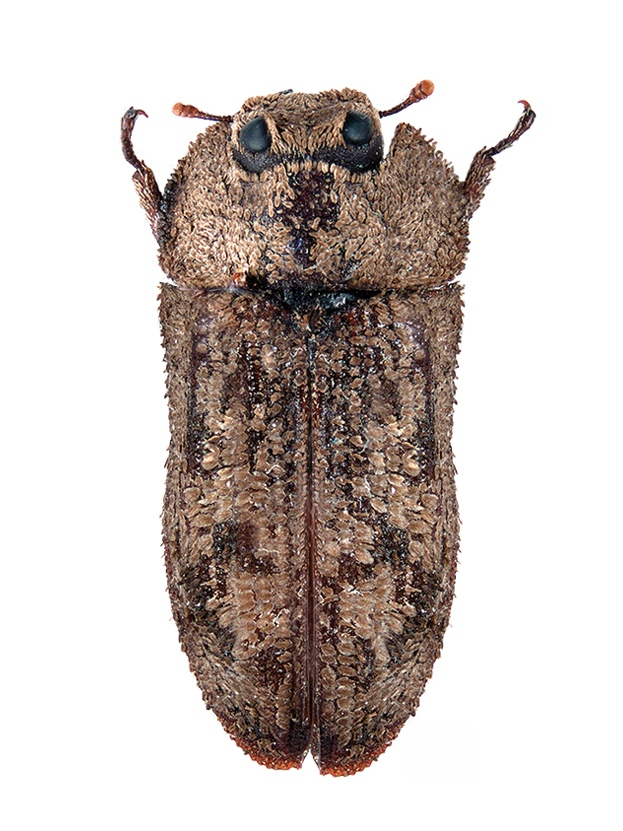
- Narcisa decidua, Indonesia

Scientific classification
- Domain: Eukaryota
- Kingdom: Animalia
- Phylum: Arthropoda
- Class: Insecta
- Order: Coleoptera
- Suborder: Polyphaga
- Infraorder: Cucujiformia
- Family: Trogossitidae
- Subfamily: Trogossitinae
- Tribe: Gymnochilini
- Genus: Narcisa; Pascoe, 1863

Type species
- Narcisa decidua Pascoe, 1863

= Narcisa (beetle) =

Genus of beetles

Narcisa is a genus of beetles in the tribe Gymnochilini. The species are found in Indonesia.

== Species ==
The following species belong do the genus Narcisa:

- Narcisa bimaculata Gestro, 1879
- Narcisa decidua Pascoe, 1863
- Narcisa lynceus Olliff, 1883
