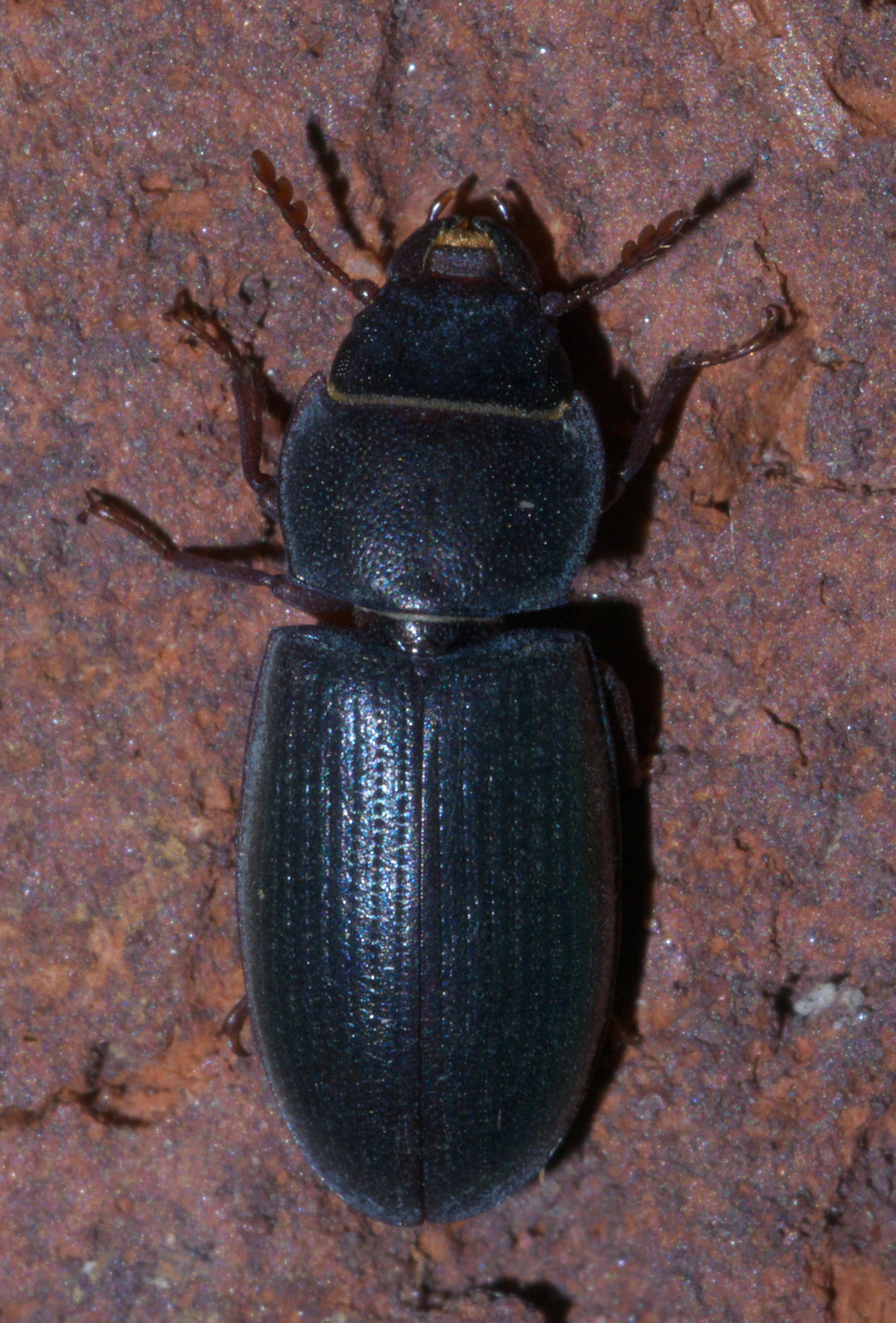

Scientific classification
- Domain: Eukaryota
- Kingdom: Animalia
- Phylum: Arthropoda
- Class: Insecta
- Order: Coleoptera
- Suborder: Polyphaga
- Infraorder: Cucujiformia
- Family: Trogossitidae
- Genus: Tenebroides
- Species: T. laticollis

Binomial name
- Tenebroides laticollis (Horn, 1862)

= Tenebroides laticollis =

Species of beetle

Tenebroides laticollis is a species of bark-gnawing beetle in the family Trogossitidae.

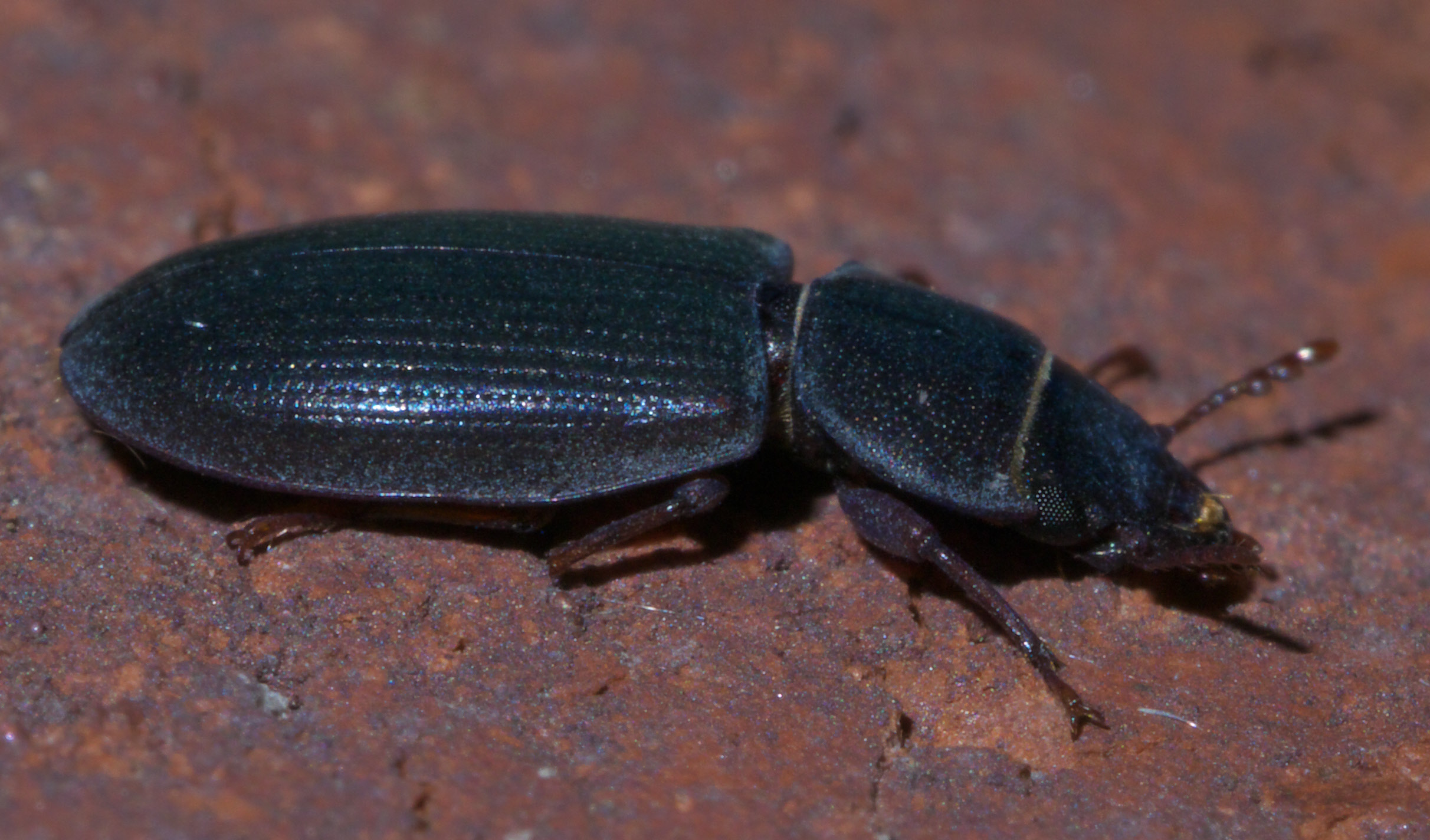

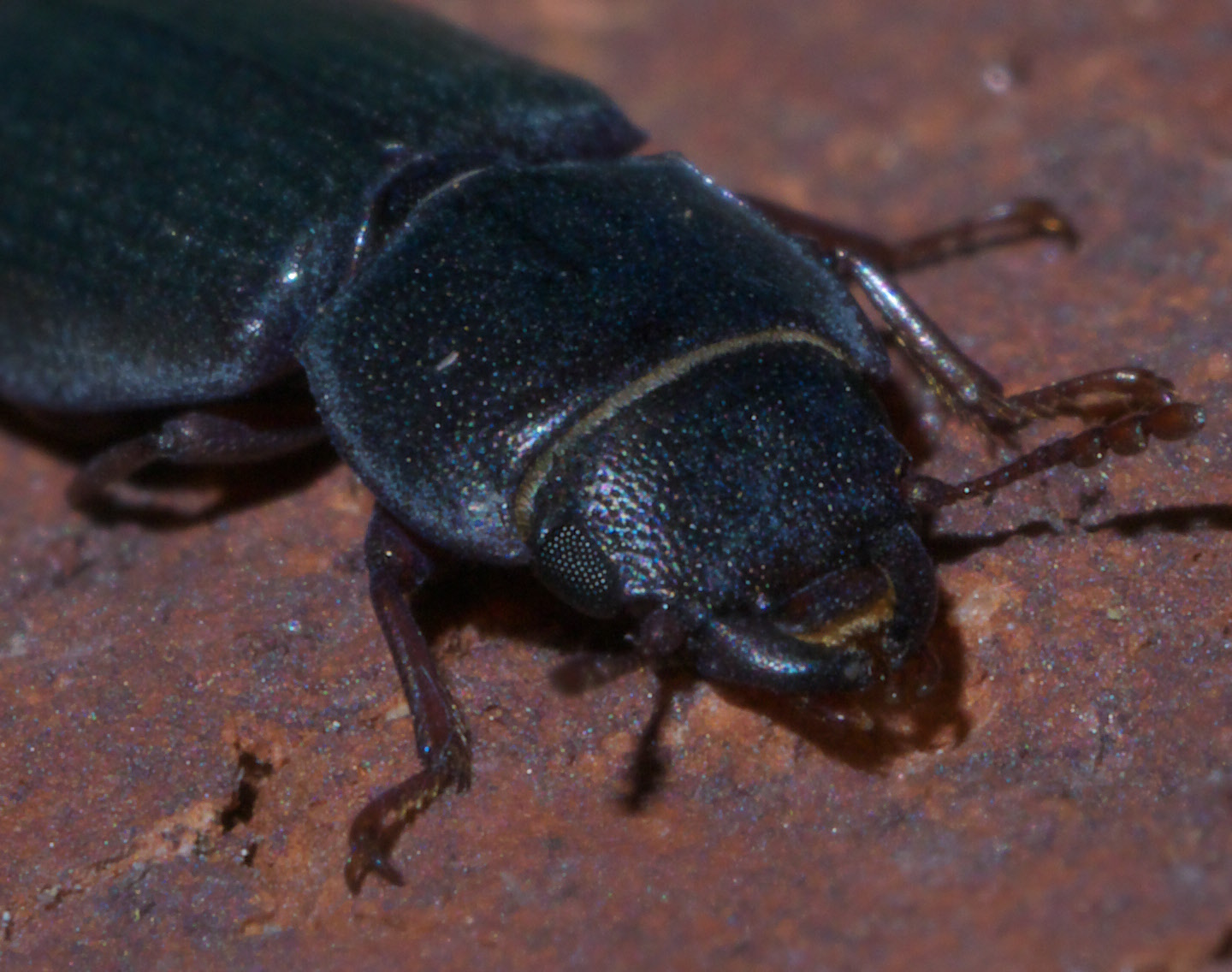
