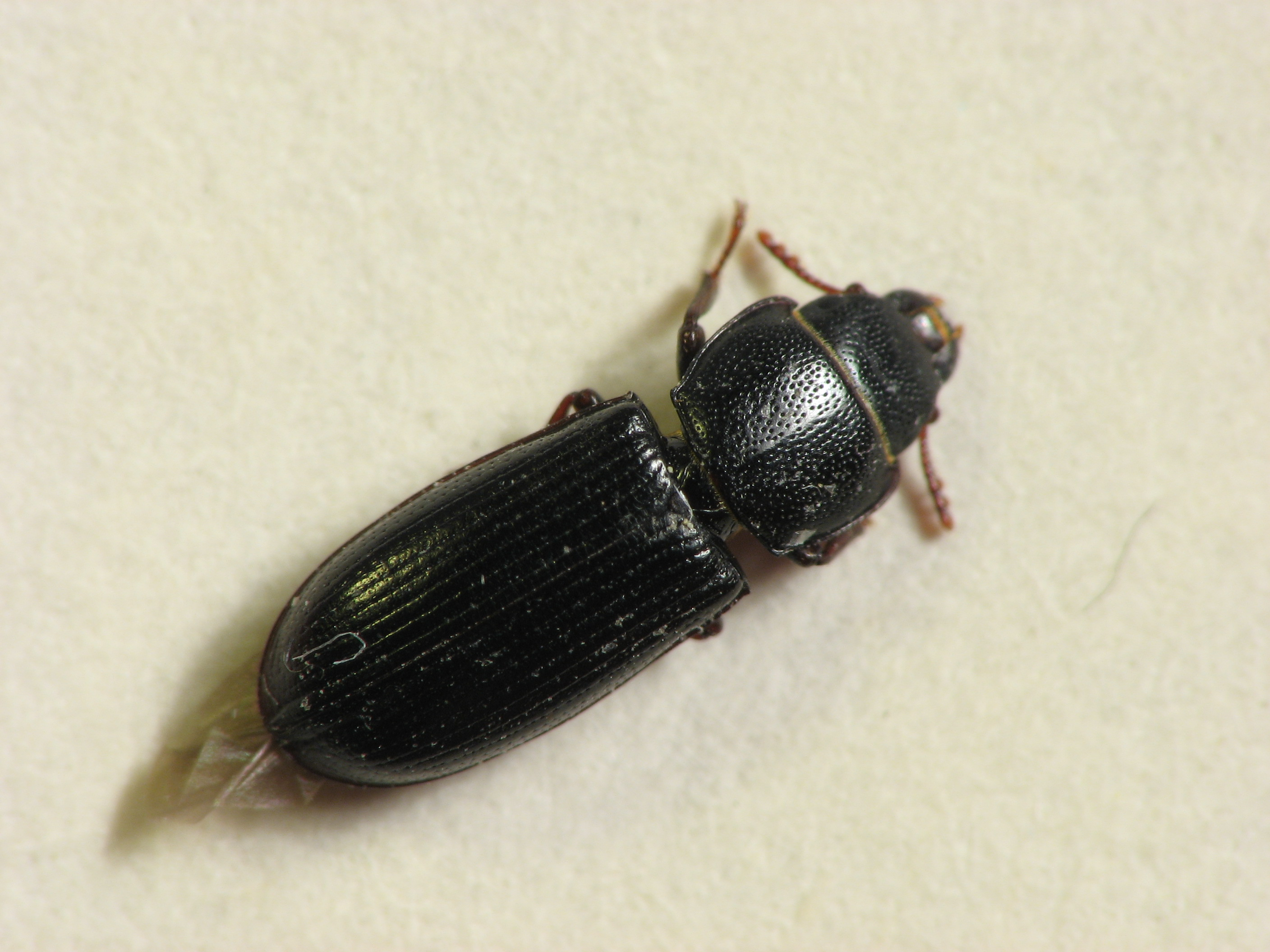
- Tenebroides corticalis, Pennsylvania, USA

Scientific classification
- Kingdom: Animalia
- Phylum: Arthropoda
- Clade: Pancrustacea
- Class: Insecta
- Order: Coleoptera
- Suborder: Polyphaga
- Infraorder: Cucujiformia
- Family: Trogossitidae
- Tribe: Trogossitini
- Genus: Tenebroides
- Species: T. corticalis

Binomial name
- Tenebroides corticalis (Melsheimer, 1844)

= Tenebroides corticalis =

Species of beetle

Tenebroides corticalis is a species of bark-gnawing beetle in the family Trogossitidae. It is found in North America.
