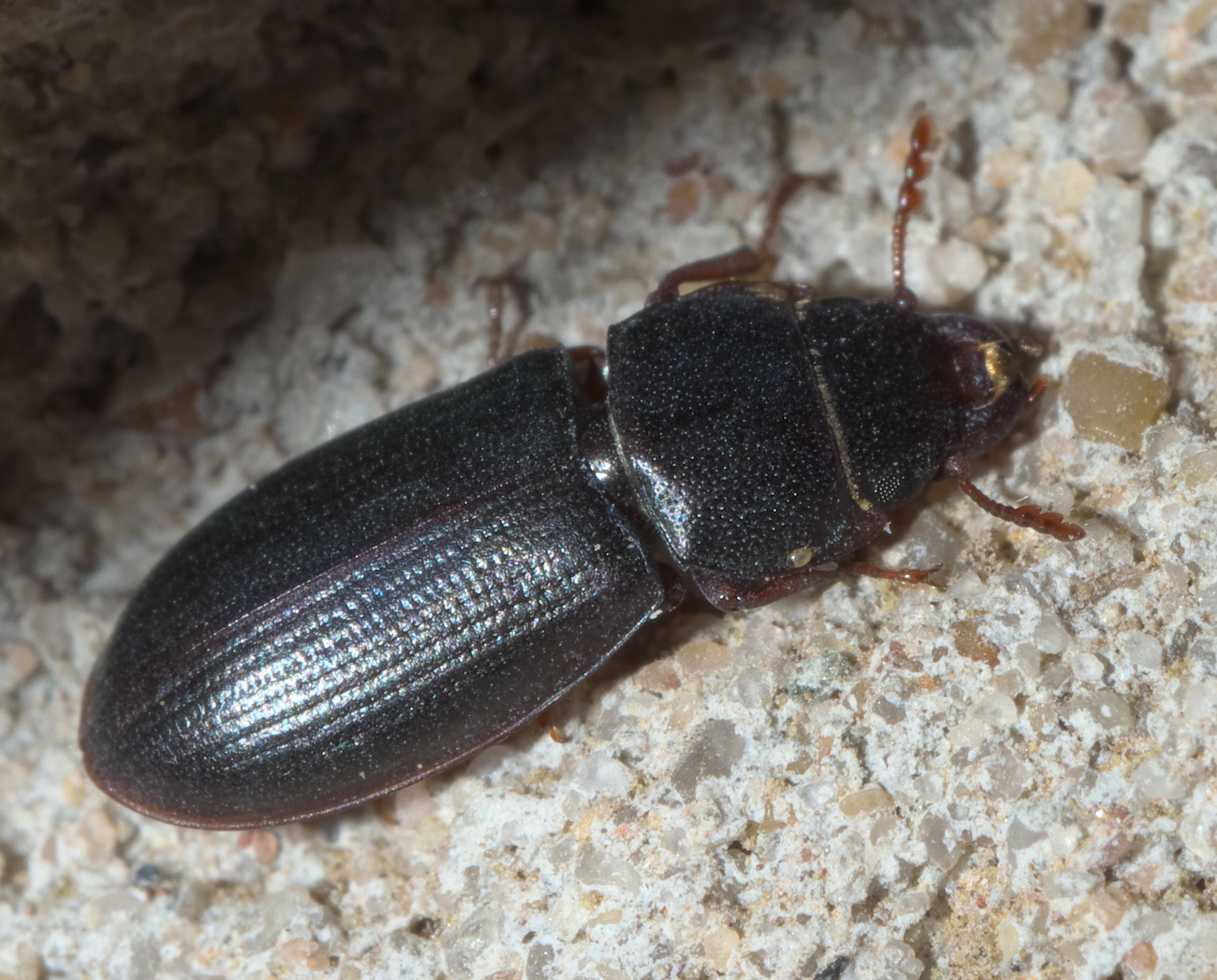

Scientific classification
- Domain: Eukaryota
- Kingdom: Animalia
- Phylum: Arthropoda
- Class: Insecta
- Order: Coleoptera
- Suborder: Polyphaga
- Infraorder: Cucujiformia
- Family: Trogossitidae
- Genus: Tenebroides
- Species: T. americanus

Binomial name
- Tenebroides americanus Kirby, 1837

= Tenebroides americanus =

Species of beetle

Tenebroides americanus is a species of bark-gnawing beetle in the family Trogossitidae.

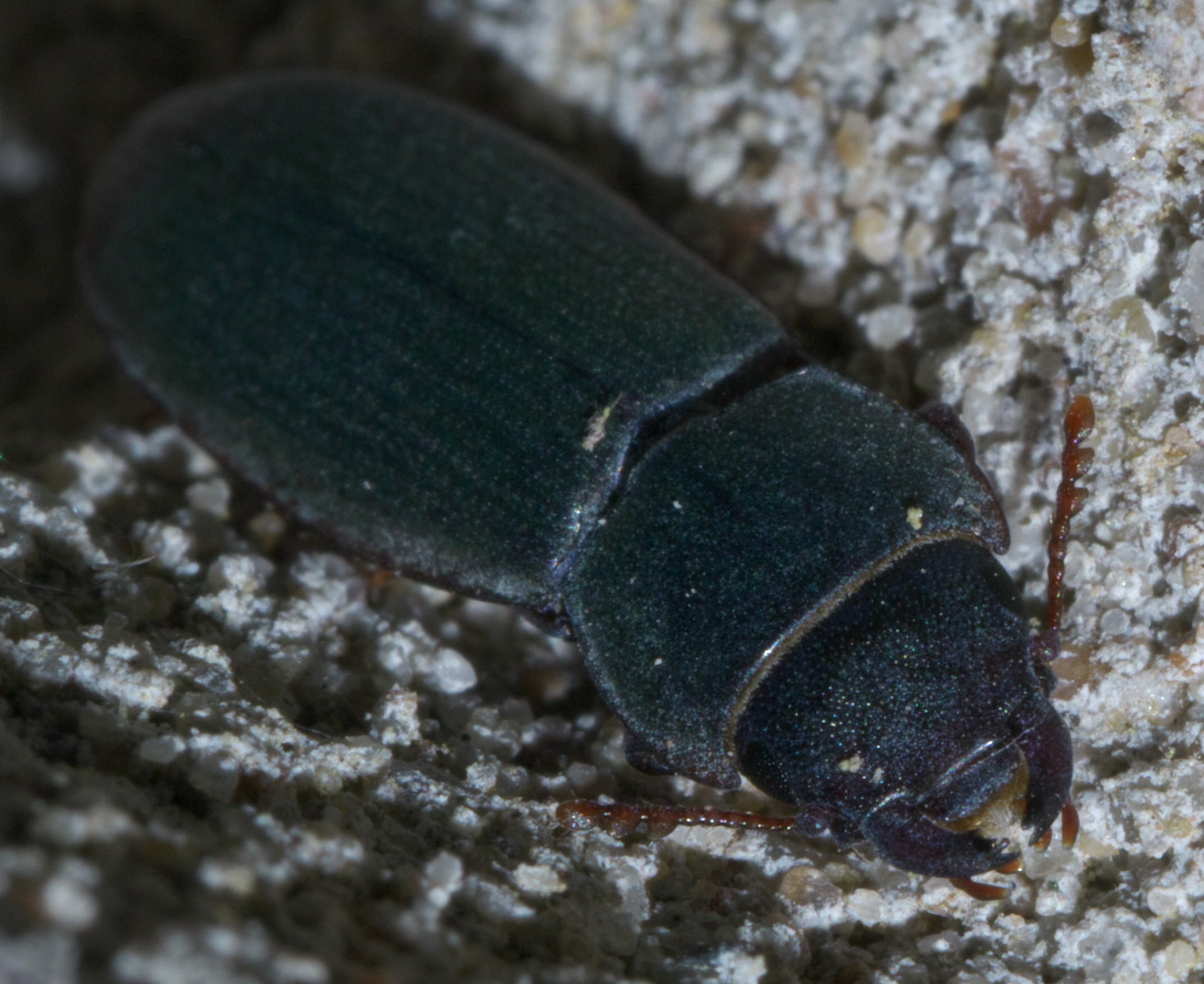
