= Necrobiopsis =

Scientific classification
- Domain: Eukaryota
- Kingdom: Animalia
- Phylum: Arthropoda
- Class: Insecta
- Order: Coleoptera
- Suborder: Polyphaga
- Infraorder: Cucujiformia
- Family: Trogossitidae
- Subfamily: Egoliinae
- Genus: Necrobiopsis; Crowson, 1964

Type species
- Necrobiopsis tasmanica Crowson, 1964

Genus of beetles

Necrobiopsis is a genus of beetles in the subfamily Egoliinae, found in Chile and Australia.

== Species ==
- Necrobiopsis shangrila Arias, et al., 2009 (Chile)
- Necrobiopsis tasmanica Crowson, 1964 (Australia)
