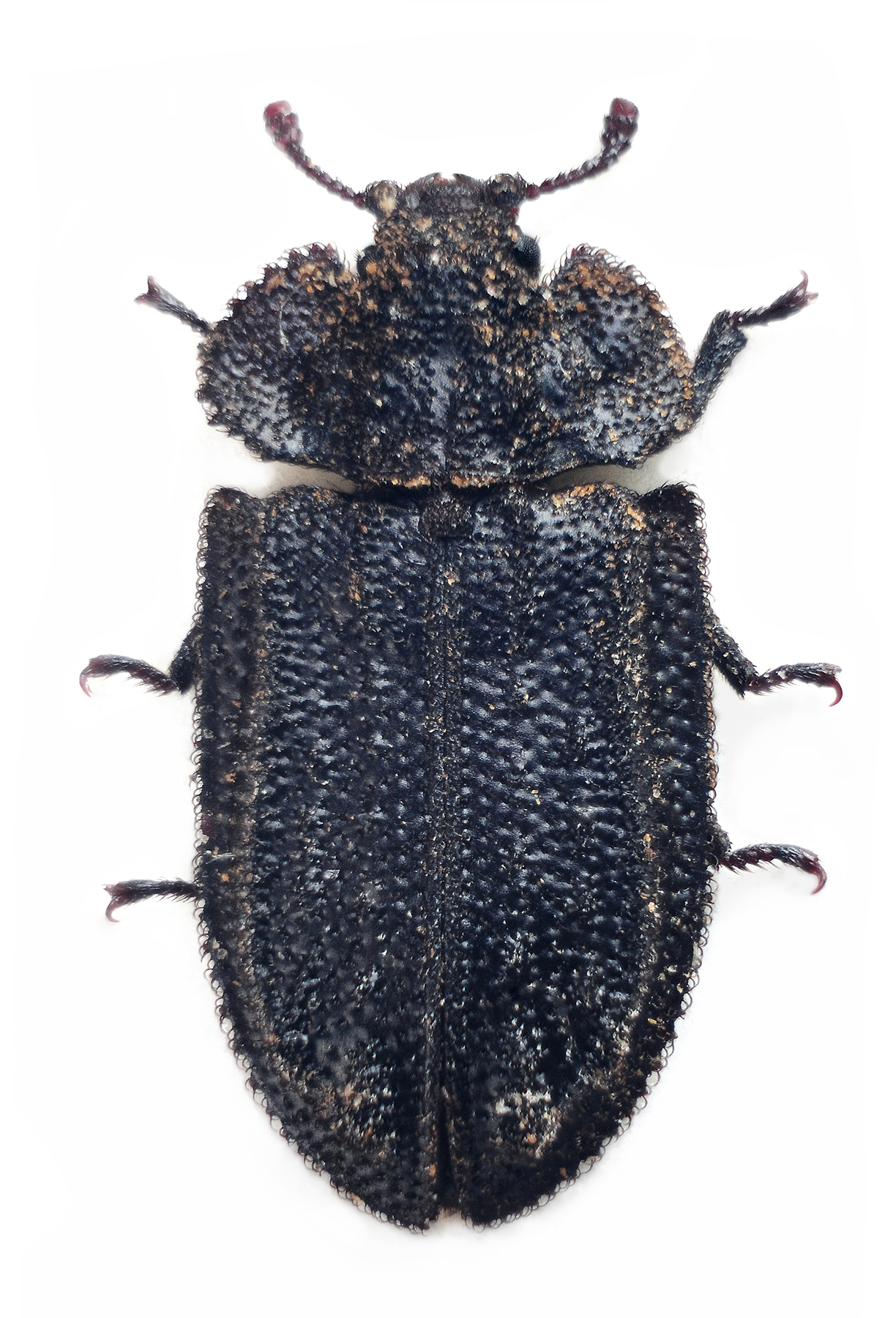
- Calitys scabra

Scientific classification
- Kingdom: Animalia
- Phylum: Arthropoda
- Clade: Pancrustacea
- Class: Insecta
- Order: Coleoptera
- Suborder: Polyphaga
- Infraorder: Cucujiformia
- Family: Trogossitidae
- Genus: Calitys; C.G.Thomson, 1859

= Calitys =

Genus of insects

Calitys is a genus of beetles belonging to the family Trogossitidae. It is the only member of the subfamily Calityinae. The genus was first described by Thomson in 1859. The genus contains two unambiguous species Calitys scabra (Thunberg, 1784), which is native to Europe and North America, and Calitys minor (Hatch, 1962), which is native to North America. Some species have been reported from South Africa, but these are disputed. The two unambiguous species live on and under the bark of coniferous trees, where they feed on fungi.
