= Acalanthis =

Scientific classification
- Kingdom: Animalia
- Phylum: Arthropoda
- Class: Insecta
- Order: Coleoptera
- Suborder: Polyphaga
- Infraorder: Cucujiformia
- Family: Trogossitidae
- Subfamily: Egoliinae
- Genus: Acalanthis; Erichson, 1844

Type species
- Acalanthis quadrisignata Erichson, 1844

Species
- Acalanthis mirabilis; Acalanthis quadrisignata; Acalanthis semimetallica

Genus of beetles

Acalanthis is a genus of checkered beetles in the subfamily Egoliinae.
