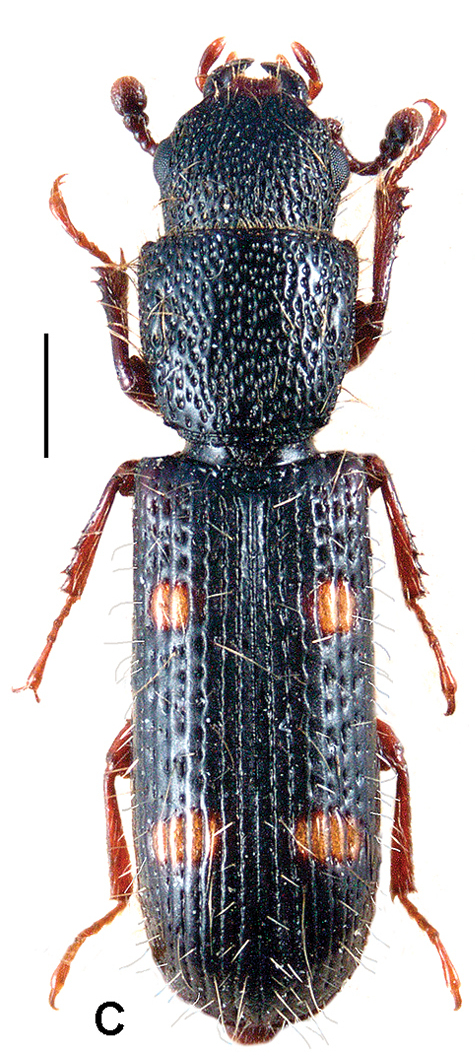
- Acalanthis quadrisignata

Scientific classification
- Domain: Eukaryota
- Kingdom: Animalia
- Phylum: Arthropoda
- Class: Insecta
- Order: Coleoptera
- Suborder: Polyphaga
- Infraorder: Cucujiformia
- Family: Trogossitidae
- Subfamily: Egoliinae; Lacordaire, 1854

Genera
- See text

= Egoliinae =

Subfamily of beetles

Egoliinae is a subfamily of beetles in the family Trogossitidae. Members are native to South America and Australia. They are thought to be predatory.

== Genera ==
- Acalanthis Erichson, 1844, Chile, Argentina
- Calanthosoma Reitter, 1876, northern South America
- Egolia Erichson, 1842 Australia (Tasmania)
- Necrobiopsis Crowson, 1964, Chile, Australia (Tasmania)
- Paracalanthis Australia (Queensland)
