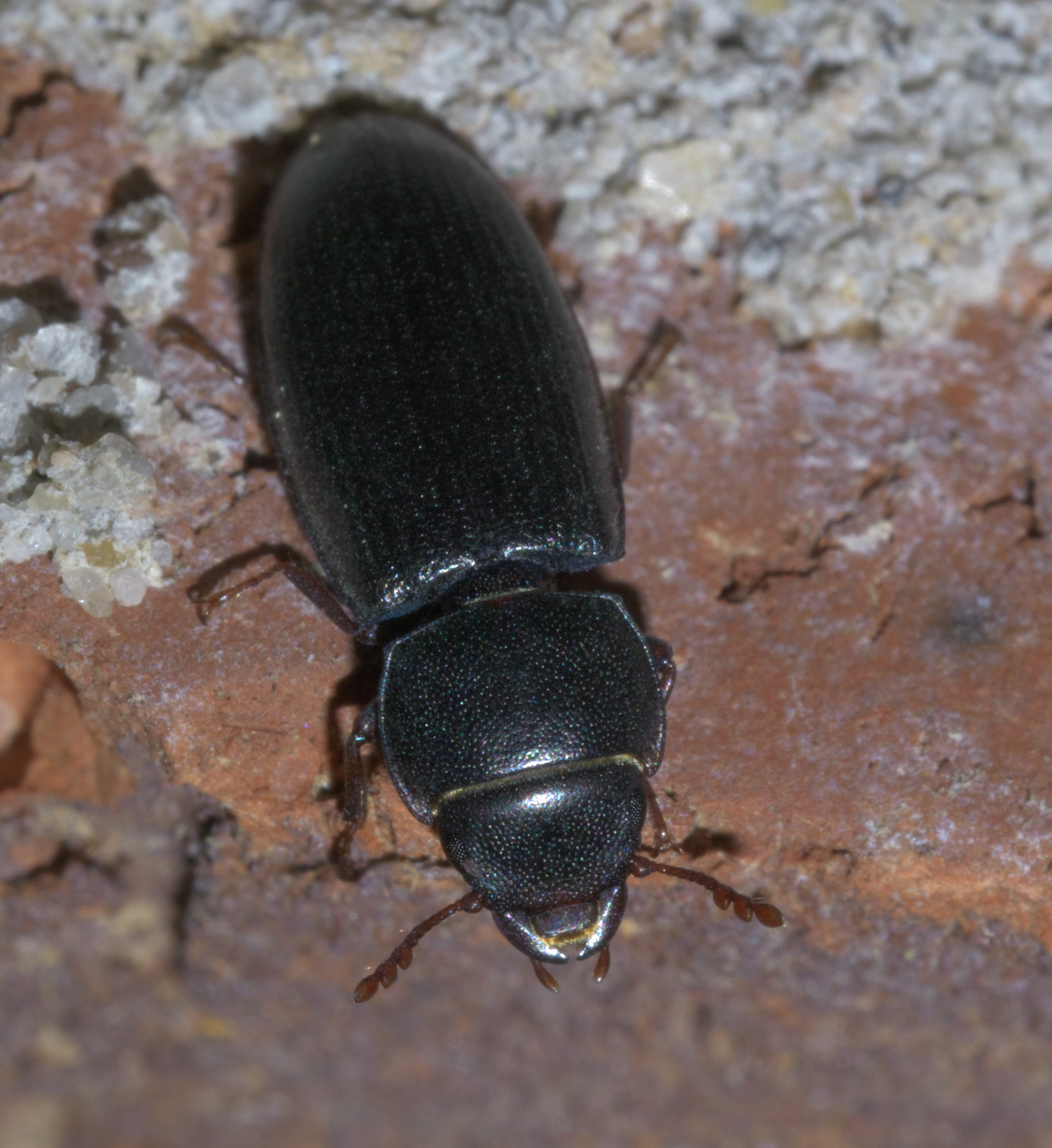

Scientific classification
- Domain: Eukaryota
- Kingdom: Animalia
- Phylum: Arthropoda
- Class: Insecta
- Order: Coleoptera
- Suborder: Polyphaga
- Infraorder: Cucujiformia
- Family: Trogossitidae
- Tribe: Trogossitini
- Genus: Tenebroides; Piller & Mitterpacher, 1783

Synonyms
- Trogossita Olivier, 1790

= Tenebroides =

Genus of beetles

Tenebroides is a genus of bark-gnawing beetles in the family Trogossitidae. There are at least 20 described species in Tenebroides.

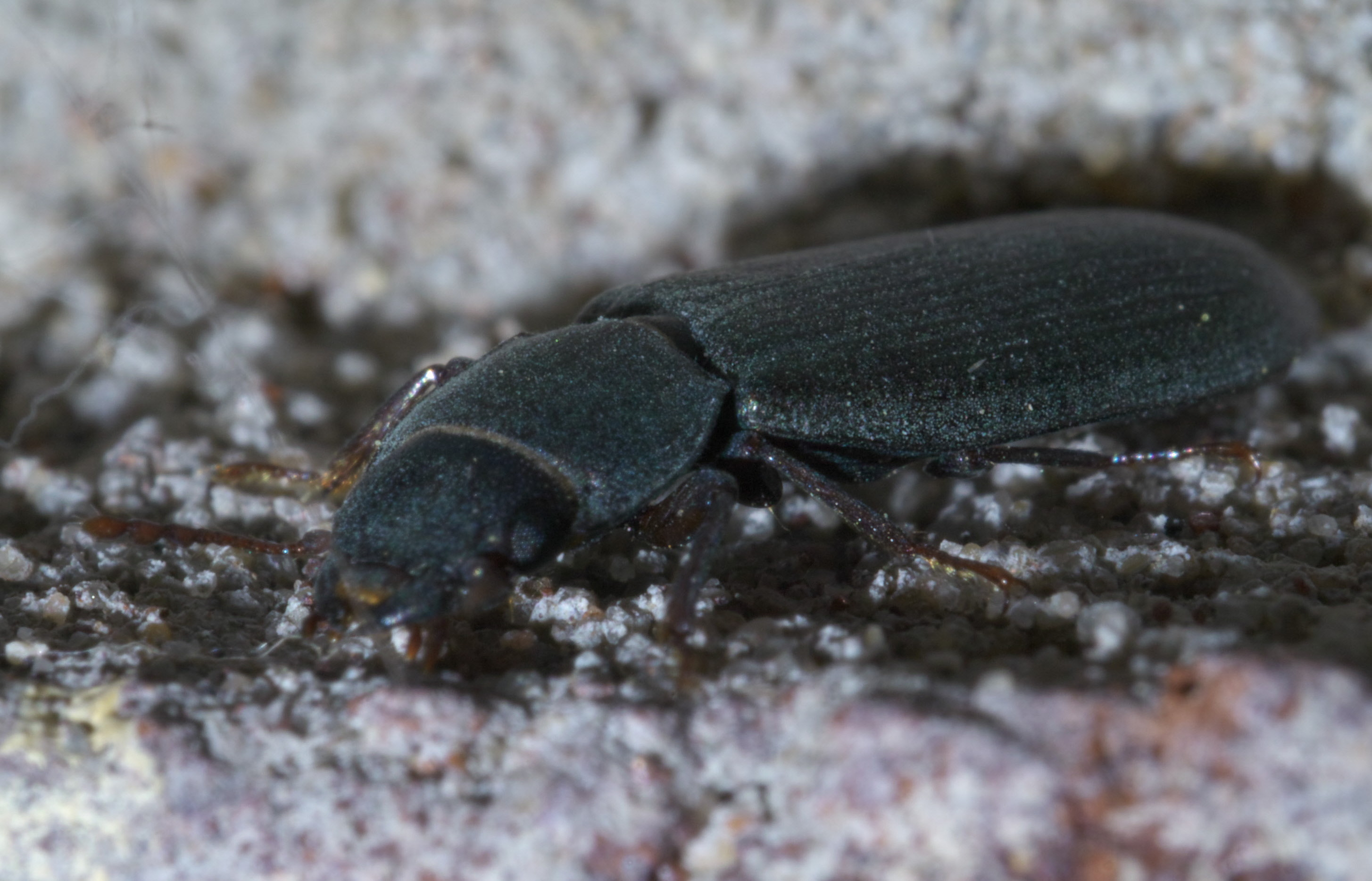

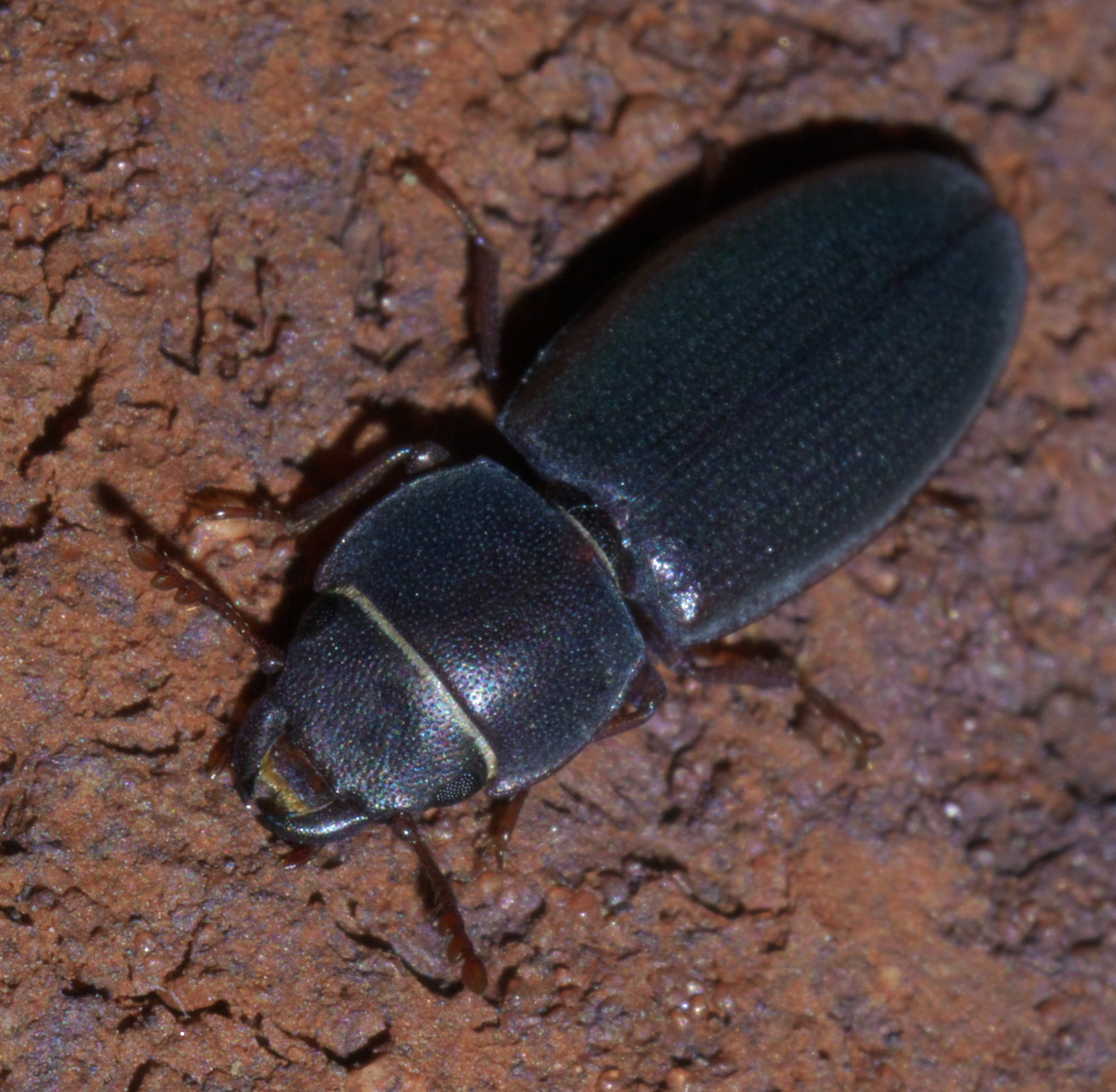

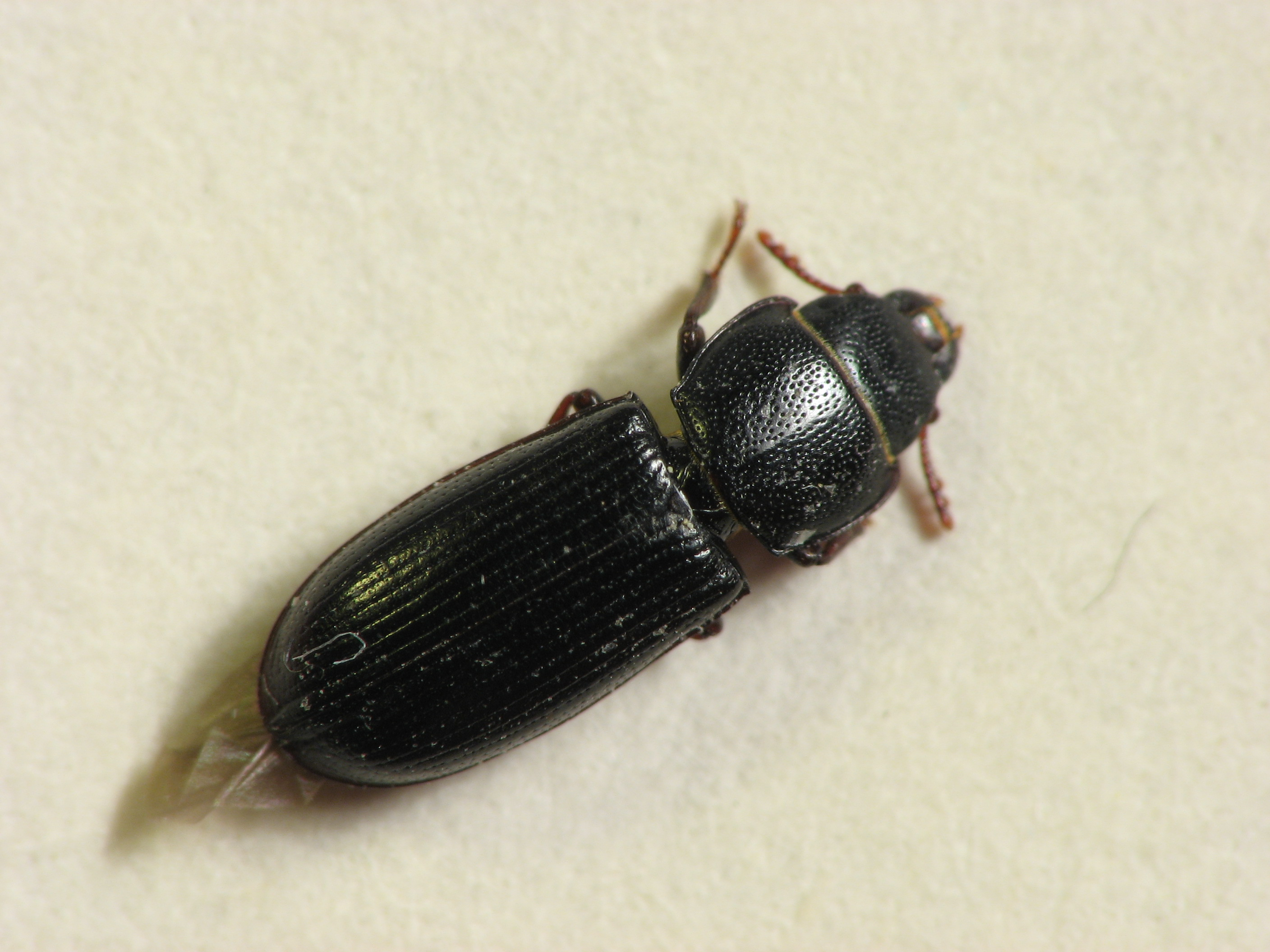
Tenebroides corticalis

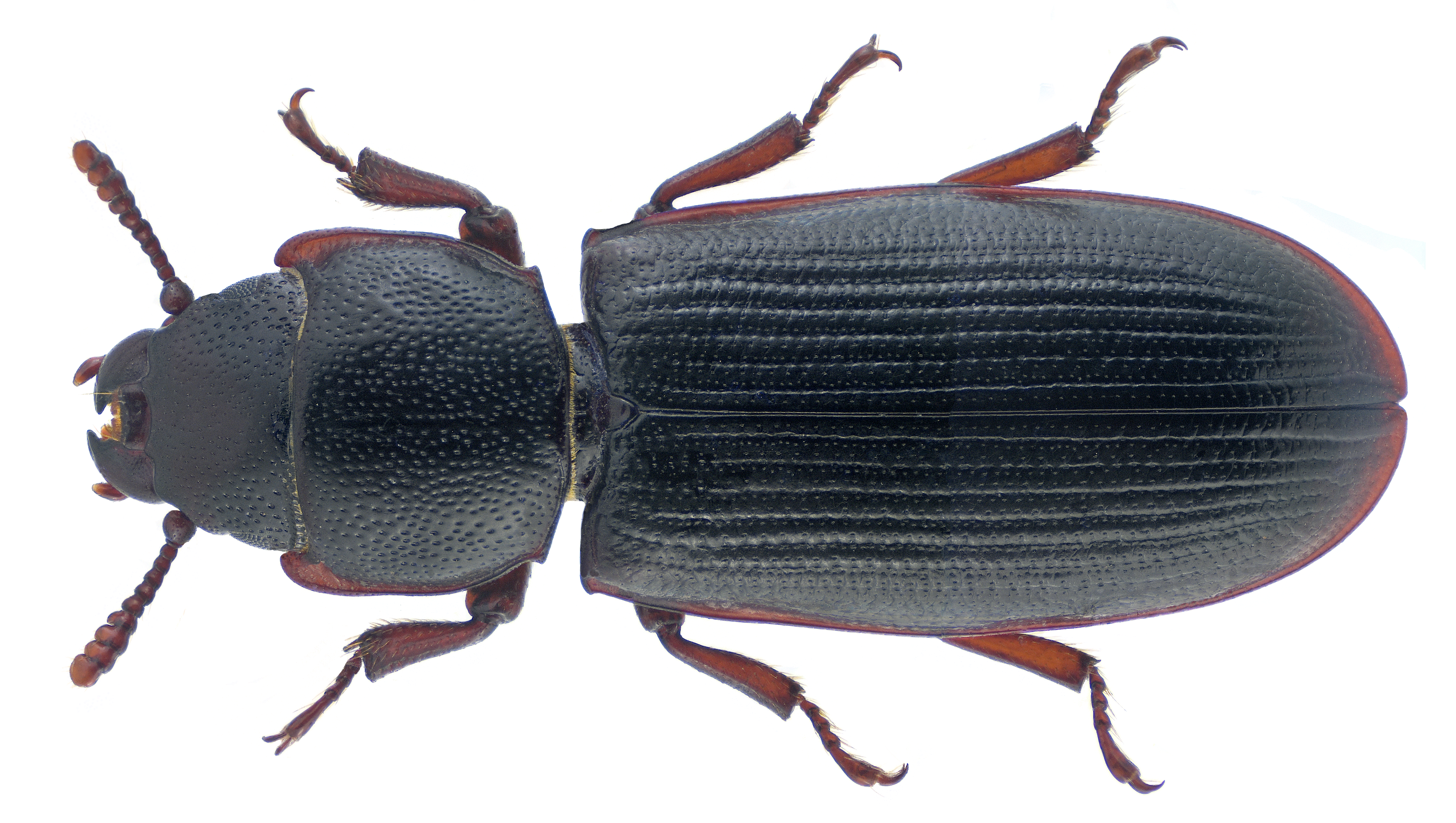
Tenebroides fuscus

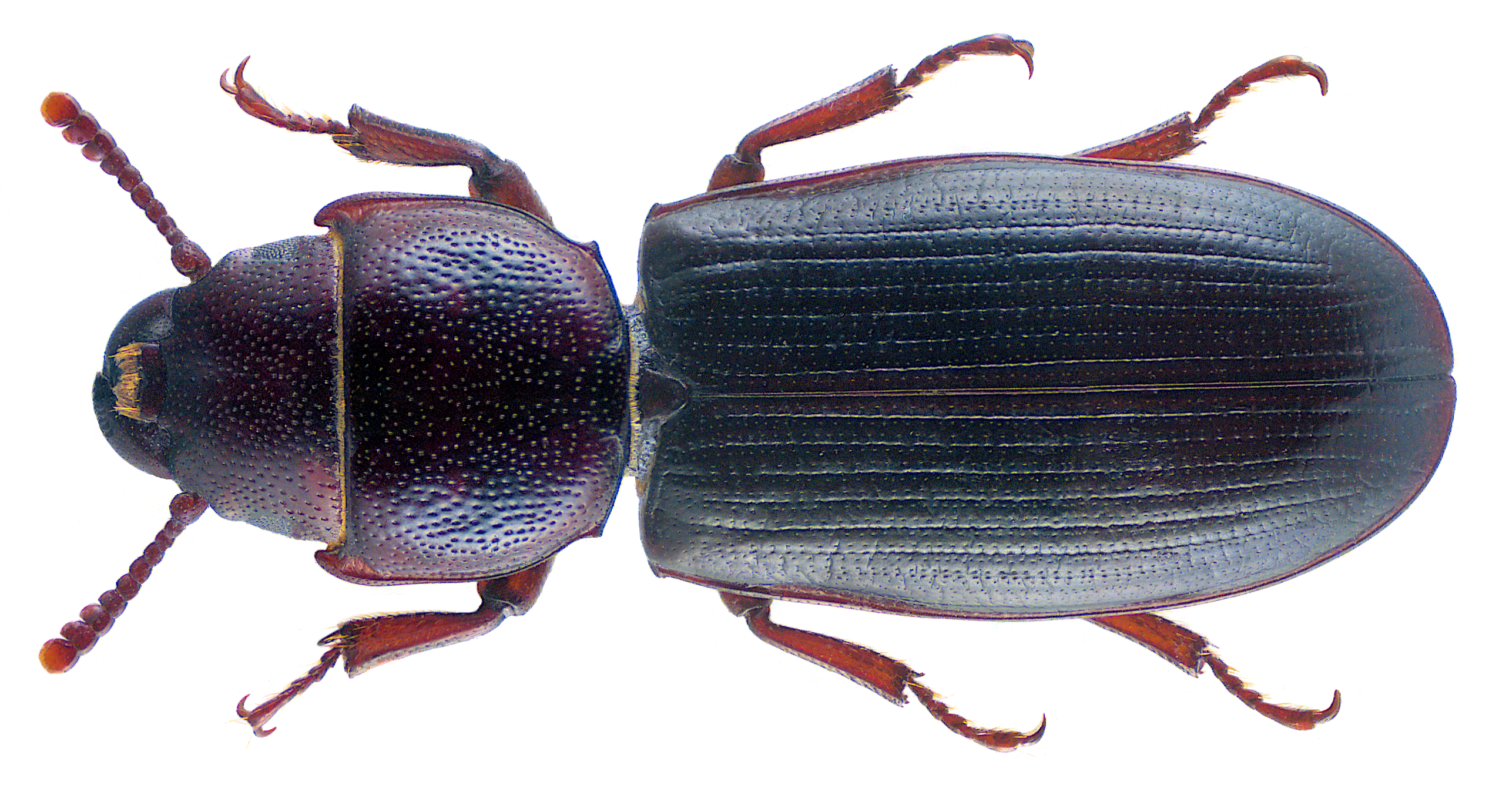
Tenebroides mauritanicus

== Species ==
These 28 species belong to the genus Tenebroides:

- Tenebroides albonotatus Reitter, 1875^{g}
- Tenebroides americanus Kirby, 1837^{g b}
- Tenebroides bimaculatus (Melsheimer, 1844)^{b} (two-spotted trogossidid)
- Tenebroides bipustulatus Fabricius, 1801^{g}
- Tenebroides brunneus Leveille, 1888^{g}
- Tenebroides carbonarius Leveille, 1888^{g}
- Tenebroides collaris (Sturm, 1807)^{g b}
- Tenebroides corticalis (Melsheimer, 1844)^{g b}
- Tenebroides crassicornis (Horn, 1862)^{g b}
- Tenebroides floridanus Schaeffer, 1918^{g b}
- Tenebroides fuscus (Preyssler, 1790)^{g}
- Tenebroides latens (Wollaston, 1862)^{g}
- Tenebroides laticollis (Horn, 1862)^{g b}
- Tenebroides marginatus Palisot de Beauvois, 1811^{b}
- Tenebroides maroccanus Reitter, 1884^{g}
- Tenebroides mauritanicus (Linnaeus, 1758)^{i c g b} (cadelle beetle)
- Tenebroides nanus (Melsheimer, 1844)^{b}
- Tenebroides obtusus Horn, 1862^{b}
- Tenebroides occidentalis Fall, 1910^{g b}
- Tenebroides punctatolineatus (Fairmaire, 1850)^{g}
- Tenebroides punctulata Reitter, 1875^{g}
- Tenebroides rectus (Wollaston, 1862)^{g}
- Tenebroides rugosipennis (Horn, 1862)^{b}
- Tenebroides semicylindricus Horn, 1862^{b}
- Tenebroides sinuatus (LeConte, 1861)^{g}
- Tenebroides sonorensis Sharp, 1891^{b}
- Tenebroides soror (Jacquelin du Val, 1857)^{b}
- Tenebroides transversicollis Jacquelin du Val, 1857^{g}

Data sources: i = ITIS, c = Catalogue of Life, g = GBIF, b = Bugguide.net
