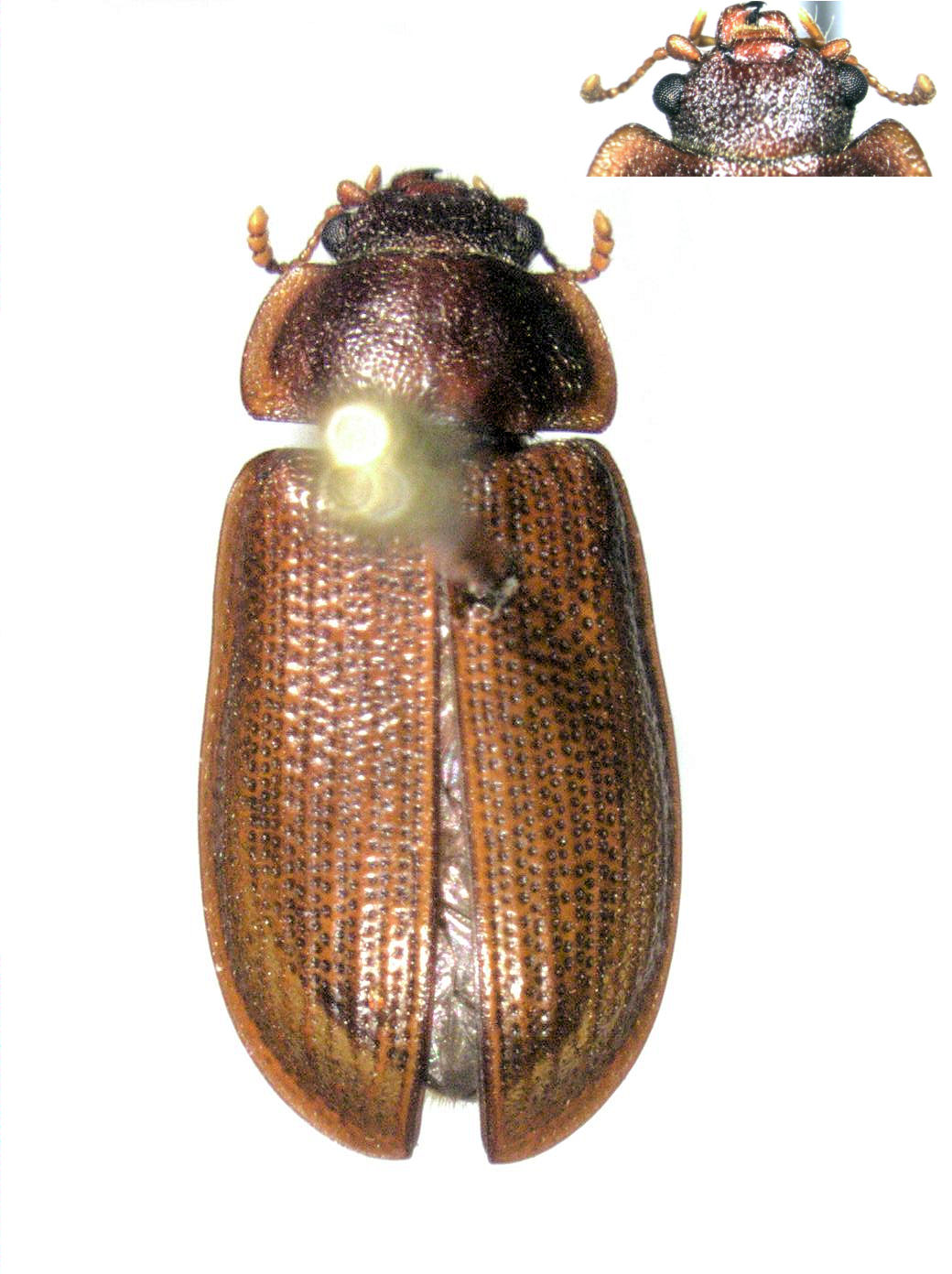

Scientific classification
- Kingdom: Animalia
- Phylum: Arthropoda
- Clade: Pancrustacea
- Class: Insecta
- Order: Coleoptera
- Suborder: Polyphaga
- Infraorder: Cucujiformia
- Family: Lophocateridae
- Genus: Promanus; Sharp, 1877

Species
- Promanus auripilus; Promanus depressus; Promanus subcostatus

= Promanus =

Genus of beetles

Promanus is a genus of beetles of the family Lophocateridae, endemic to New Zealand.
