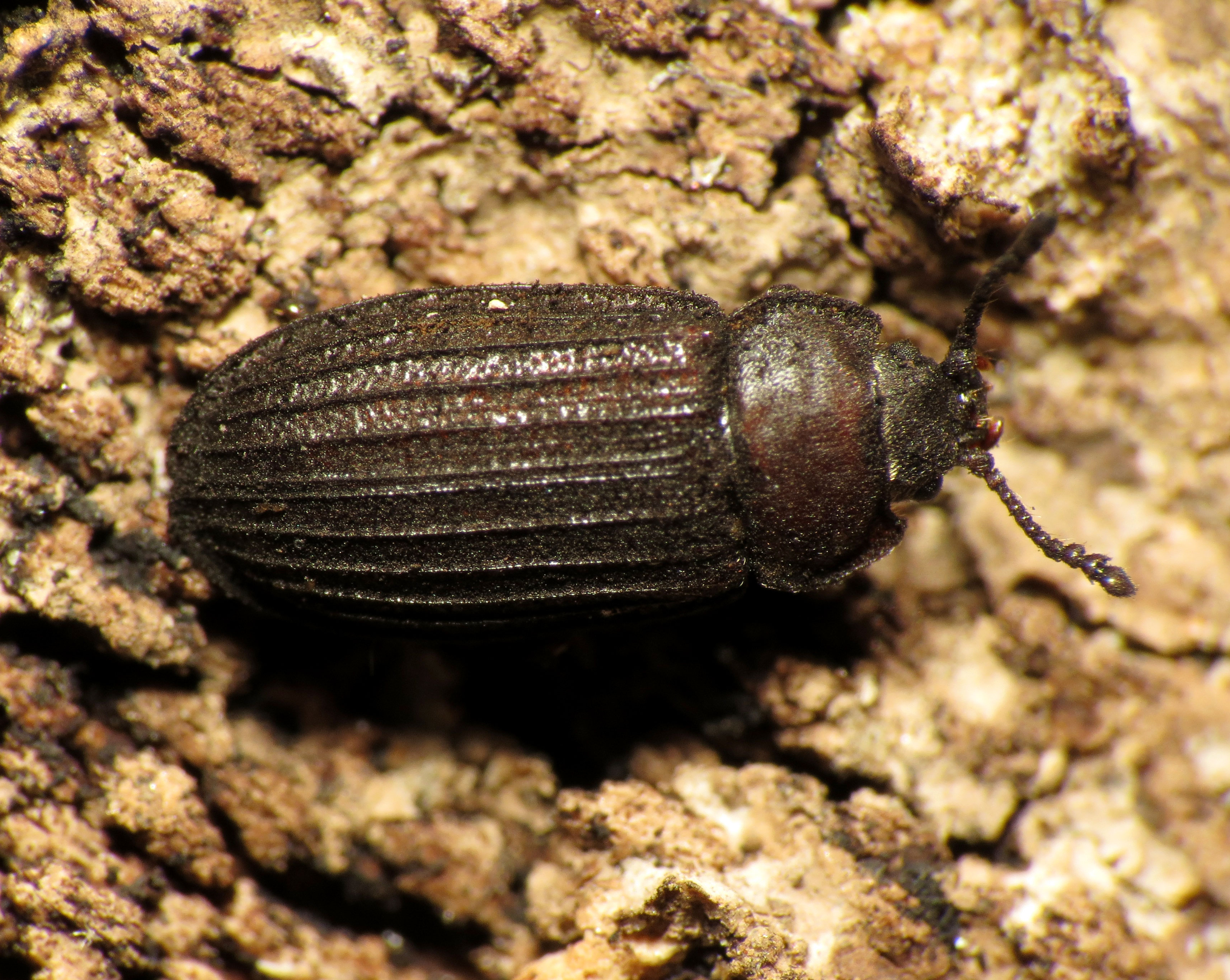
- Grynocharis quadrilineata

Scientific classification
- Kingdom: Animalia
- Phylum: Arthropoda
- Clade: Pancrustacea
- Class: Insecta
- Order: Coleoptera
- Suborder: Polyphaga
- Infraorder: Cucujiformia
- Superfamily: Cleroidea
- Family: Lophocateridae; Crowson, 1964

Genera
- See text.

= Lophocateridae =

Lophocateridae Temporal range: Aptian–Recent

Family of beetles

Lophocateridae is a family of beetles in the superfamily Cleroidea, formerly included in the Trogossitidae. Members of the group have a variety of ecologies, including as predators of other insects, as fungivores, or are phytophagous.

== Genera ==
- Afrocyrona Kolibáč
- Ancyrona Reitter, 1876 (= Latolaeva)
- Antillipeltis Lawrence, Leschen & Slipinski, 2014
- Colydiopeltis Slipinski
- Eronyxa Reitter, 1876
- Grynocharina Reitter
- Grynocharis Thomson, 1859
- Grynoma Sharp
- Indopeltis Crowson, 1966
- Leptonyxa Reitter
- Lophocateres Olliff, 1883
- Lycoptis Casey, 1890
- Neaspis Pascoe
- Parapeltis Slipinski
- Peltonyxa Reitter
- Promanus Sharp, 1877
- Trichocateres Kolibác, 2010
- †Sinosoronia Zhang 1992 Laiyang Formation, China, Early Cretaceous (Aptian)
- †Mesolophocateres Yu, Leschen & Ślipiński 2021 Burmese amber, Myanmar, Late Cretaceous (Cenomanian)
- †Parayixianteres Yu, Leschen & Ślipiński 2021 Burmese amber, Myanmar, Cenomanian
