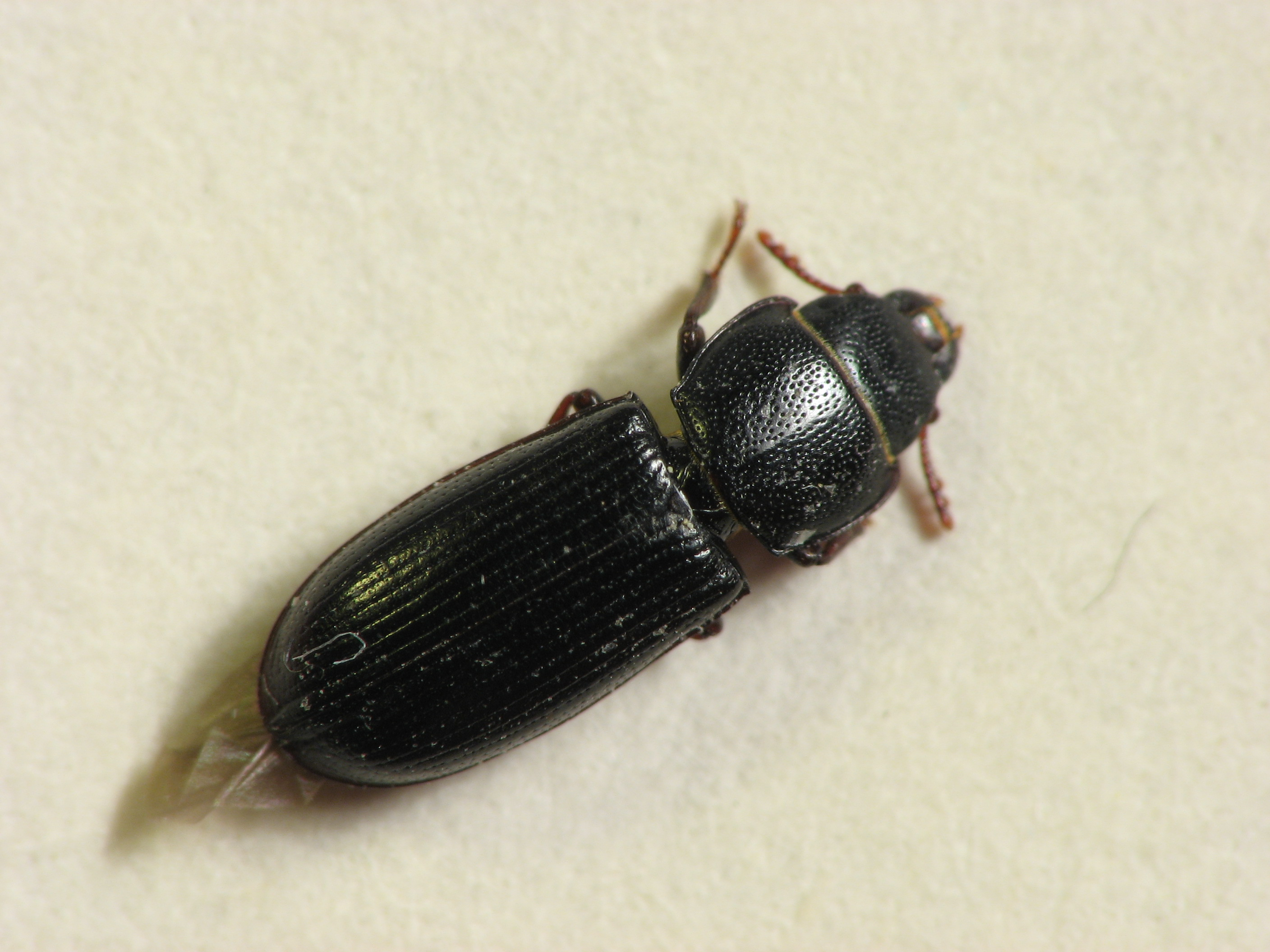
- Tenebroides corticalis

Scientific classification
- Kingdom: Animalia
- Phylum: Arthropoda
- Clade: Pancrustacea
- Class: Insecta
- Order: Coleoptera
- Suborder: Polyphaga
- Infraorder: Cucujiformia
- Family: Trogossitidae
- Subfamily: Trogossitinae; Latreille, 1802

Tribes
- Gymnochilini; Trogossitini

= Trogossitinae =

Subfamily of beetles

Trogossitinae is a subfamily of beetles in the family Trogossitidae.
