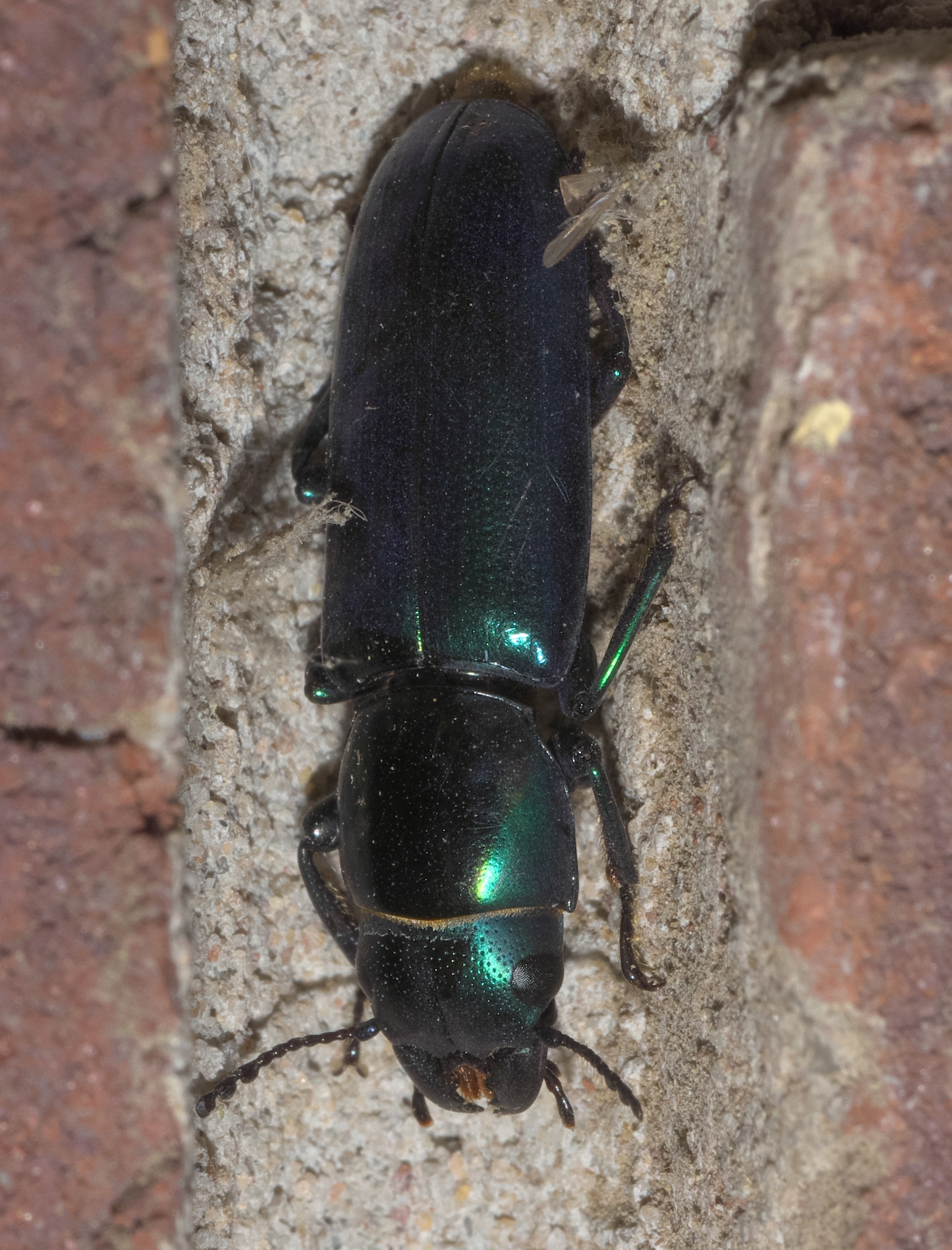
- Temnoscheila acuta

Scientific classification
- Domain: Eukaryota
- Kingdom: Animalia
- Phylum: Arthropoda
- Class: Insecta
- Order: Coleoptera
- Suborder: Polyphaga
- Infraorder: Cucujiformia
- Family: Trogossitidae
- Genus: Temnoscheila; Westwood, 1830

Synonyms
- Temnochila Erichson, 1844

= Temnoscheila =

Genus of beetles

Temnoscheila is a genus of bark-gnawing beetles in the family Trogossitidae, historically often misspelled as "Temnochila". There are about 19 described species in Temnoscheila.

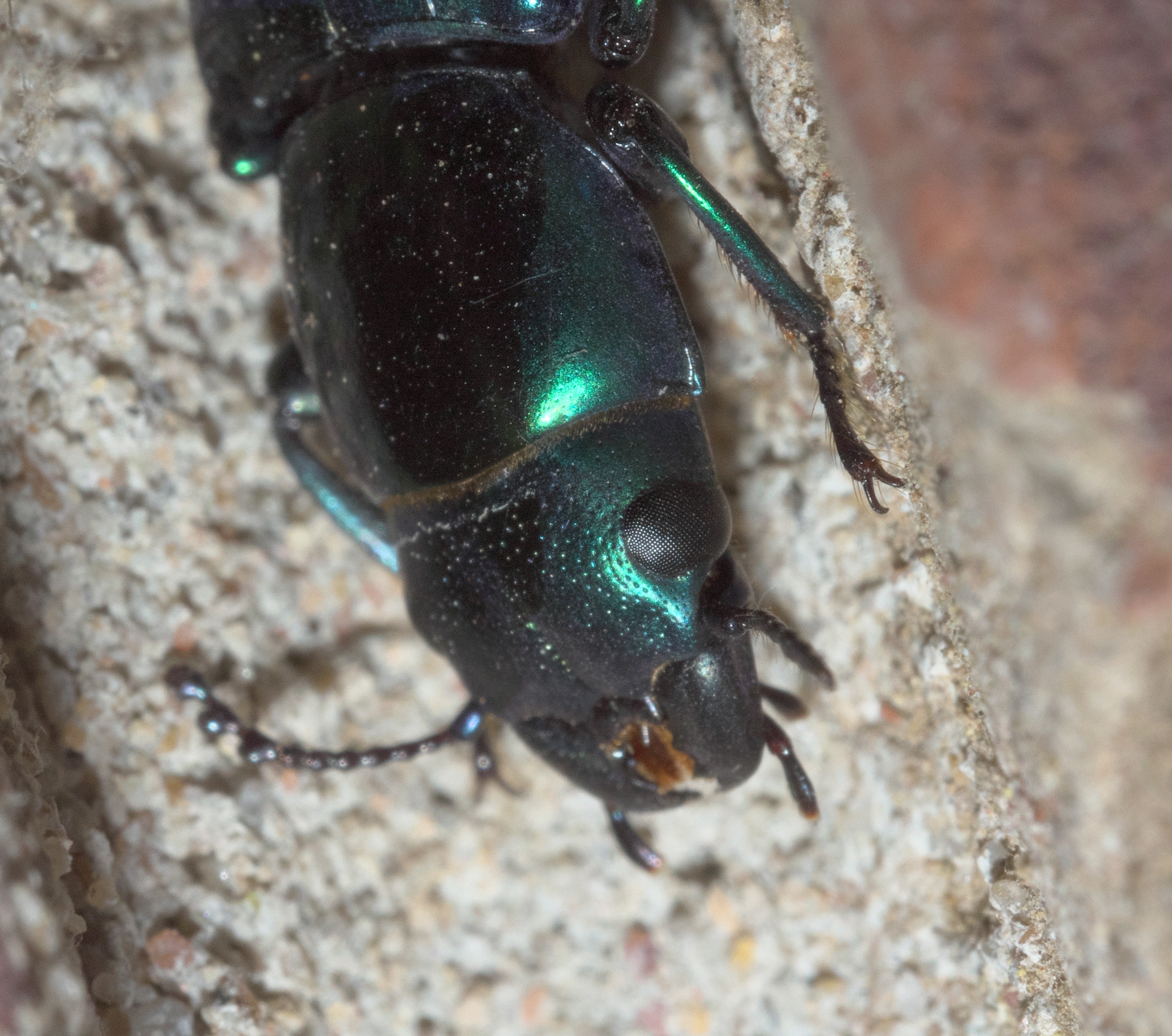

== Species ==
These 19 species belong to the genus Temnoscheila:

- Temnoscheila acuta^{b}
- Temnoscheila aerea^{b}
- Temnoscheila barbata^{b}
- Temnoscheila coerulea (Olivier, 1790)^{g}
- Temnoscheila chevrolati Reitter, 1875^{g}
- Temnoscheila chlorodia (Mannerheim, 1843)^{g b} (green bark beetle)
- Temnoscheila chrysostema Reitter, 1875^{g}
- Temnoscheila colossus (Audinet-Serville, 1828)^{g}
- Temnoscheila curta Léveillé, 1889^{g}
- Temnoscheila doumerei Audinet-Serville, 1828^{g}
- Temnoscheila edentata^{b}
- Temnoscheila foveicollis Reitter, 1875^{g}
- Temnoscheila hubbardi^{b}
- Temnoscheila laevicollis Reitter, 1875^{g}
- Temnoscheila obscura (Reitter, 1875)^{g}
- Temnoscheila omolopha^{b}
- Temnoscheila splendida Gory, 1831^{g}
- Temnoscheila varians Guerini, 1846^{g}
- Temnoscheila virescens (Fabricius, 1775)^{b}

Data sources: i = ITIS, c = Catalogue of Life, g = GBIF, b = Bugguide.net
