= Nemozoma =

Scientific classification
- Kingdom: Animalia
- Phylum: Arthropoda
- Class: Insecta
- Order: Coleoptera
- Suborder: Polyphaga
- Infraorder: Cucujiformia
- Family: Trogossitidae
- Genus: Nemozoma; Latreille, 1804

Synonyms
- Nemosoma Latreille, 1809 Emend.; Nematosoma Agassiz, 1846 Emend.; Nemosomia Reitter, 1876; Cylidrella Sharp, 1891; Monesoma Léveillé, 1894; Pseudalindria Fall, 1910; Aponemosoma Lepesme & Paulian, 1944; Paranemosoma Lepesme & Paulian, 1944

Genus of beetles

Nemozoma is a genus of beetles belonging to the family Trogossitidae, historically often spelled as Nemosoma.

== Selected species ==
- Nemozoma attenuata Van Dyke, 1915
- Nemozoma caucasica Ménétriés, 1832
- Nemozoma cornuta Sturm, 1826
- Nemozoma cupressi Van Dyke, 1944
- Nemozoma elongata (Linnaeus, 1760)
- Nemozoma fissiceps Fall, 1910
- Nemozoma gymnosternalis Kolibáč, 2014
- Nemozoma punctulata Van Dyke, 1920
- Nemozoma schwarzi Schaeffer, 1918
