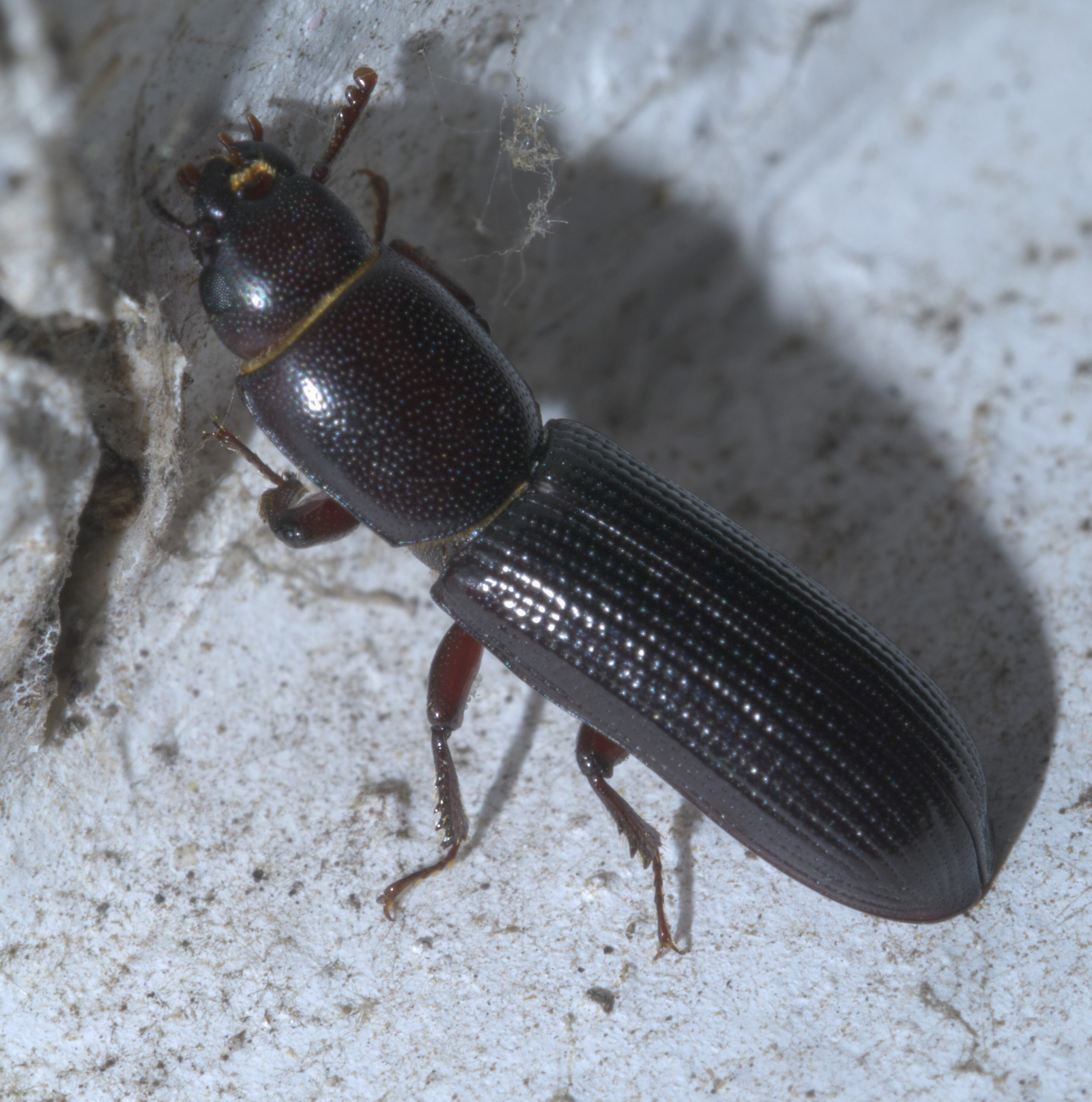
- Airora cylindrica (Trogossitinae)
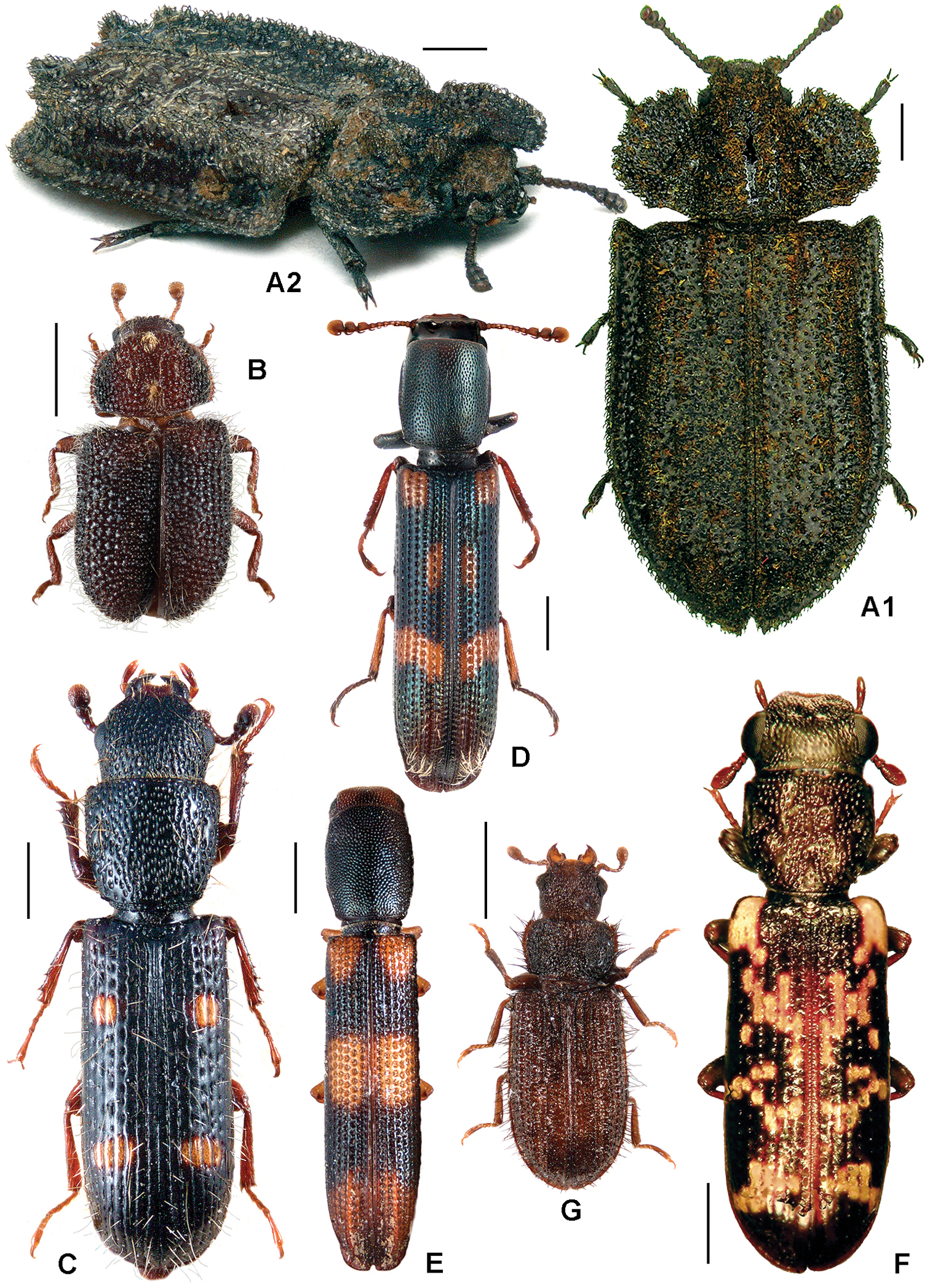
- Members of the other subfamilies Calityinae (A) Larinotinae (B) Egoliinae (C-F)

Scientific classification
- Kingdom: Animalia
- Phylum: Arthropoda
- Class: Insecta
- Order: Coleoptera
- Suborder: Polyphaga
- Infraorder: Cucujiformia
- Superfamily: Cleroidea
- Family: Trogossitidae; Latreille, 1802

Subfamilies
- Calityinae; Egoliinae; Larinotinae; Trogossitinae

Synonyms
- Trogositidae

= Trogossitidae =

Trogossitidae Temporal range: Cenomanian–Recent

Family of beetles

Trogossitidae, also known as bark-gnawing beetles, are a small family in the superfamily Cleroidea. Many taxa formerly within this family have been removed (as of 2019) to other families, such as Lophocateridae, Peltidae, Protopeltidae, Rentoniidae, and Thymalidae. Members of the family are generally predatory and/or feed on fungi, both in adult and larval stages, and are generally associated with wood, being found under bark or inside bored tunnel galleries. There are about 400 species in 25 genera in the family under the new, restricted circumscription, as opposed to 600 species in over 50 genera in the old definition. The oldest fossil assignable to the modern, more restricted definition of the family is Microtrogossita from the mid-Cretaceous Burmese amber of Myanmar, which has close affinities to the Trogossitini, indicating that the family had already considerably diversified by this time.

== Genera ==
- Acalanthis Erichson, 1844
- Airora Reitter, 1876
- Alindria Erichson
- Anacypta Illiger
- Calanthosoma Reitter
- Calitys Thomson, 1859
- Corticotomus Sharp, 1891
- Dupontiella Spinola
- Egolia Erichson, 1842
- Elestora Pascoe
- Eupycnus Sharp
- Euschaefferia Leng, 1920
- Gymnocheilis Dejean
- Kolibacia Leschen & Lackner, 2013
- Larinotus Carter & Zeck
- Leipaspis Wollaston, 1862
- Leperina Erichson, 1844
- Melambia Erichson
- Narcisa Pascoe
- Necrobiopsis Crowson, 1964
- Nemozoma Latreille, 1804
- Paracalanthis Crowson
- Parallelodera Fairmaire, 1881
- Phanodesta Reitter
- Seidlitzella Jakobson
- Temnoscheila Westwood, 1830
- Tenebroides Piller & Mitterpacher, 1783
- Xenoglena Reitter
